= List of justices of the Supreme Court of Alabama =

Following is a list of the justices of the Supreme Court of Alabama.

== Current justices ==
Justice	First elected	Next election	Party	Law school
Greg Shaw	2009	2026	Republican	Cumberland (JD), University of Virginia (LLM)
Alisa Kelli Wise	2011	2022	Republican	Thomas Goode Jones
Tommy Bryan	2013	2030	Republican	Thomas Goode Jones
Will Sellers	2017	2030	Republican	University of Alabama (JD), New York University (LLM)
Brady E. Mendheim Jr.	2018	2026	Republican	Cumberland
Sarah Hicks Stewart	2019 (Chief Justice since 2025)	2030	Republican	Vanderbilt
Greg Cook	2022	2028	Republican	Harvard
Chris McCool	2025	2030	Republican	University of Alabama
Will Parker	2025	2026	Republican	University of Alabama

== Chief justices ==
Judge	Began active service	Ended active service
Clement Comer Clay	1820	1823
Abner Smith Lipscomb	1823	1834
Reuben Saffold	1834	1836
Henry Hitchcock	1836	1837
Arthur F. Hopkins	1837	1837
Henry W. Collier	1837	1849
Edmund S. Dargan	1849	1852
William Parish Chilton	1852	1856
George Goldthwaite	1856	1856
Samuel Farrow Rice	1856	1859
Abram Joseph Walker	1859	1868
E. Woolsey Peck	1868	1873
Thomas Minott Peters	1873	1874
Robert C. Brickell	1874; 1894	1884; 1898
George W. Stone	1884	1894
Thomas N. McClellan	1898	1906
Samuel D. Weakley	1906	1907
John R. Tyson	1906	1909
James R. Dowdell	1909	1914
John C. Anderson	1914	1940
Lucien D. Gardner	1940	1951
J. Ed Livingston	1951	1971
Howell Heflin	1971	1977
C. C. Torbert Jr.	1977	1989
Ernest C. Hornsby	1989	1995
Perry Hooper Sr.	1995	2001
Roy Moore	2001; 2013	2003; 2016
Drayton Nabers Jr.	2004	2007
Sue Bell Cobb	2007	2011
Charles R. Malone	2011	2013
Lyn Stuart	2016	2019
Tom Parker	2019	2025
Sarah Hicks Stewart	2025	present

== Associate justices ==
Judge	Began active service	Ended active service
Henry Y. Webb	1820	1823
Abner Smith Lipscomb	1820	1823
Richard Ellis	1820	1831
Reuben Saffold	1820	1834
Anderson Crenshaw	1821	1831
John Gayle	1823	1828
Henry Minor	1823	1825
John White	1825	1831
John M. Taylor	1825	1834
Sion L. Perry	1828	1832
Henry W. Collier	1828; 1836	1831; 1837
Harry I. Thornton Sr.	1834	1836
Henry Hitchcock	1834	1836
Arthur F. Hopkins	1836	1837
John James Ormond	1837	1847
Henry Goldthwaite	1837	1847
Clement Comer Clay	1843	1843
Edmund S. Dargan	1847	1849
William Parish Chilton	1847	1852
Silas Parsons	1849	1851
Daniel Coleman	1851	1851
David G. Ligon	1851	1854
George Goldthwaite	1851	1856
Lyman Gibbons	1852	1854
John Dennis Phelan	1852; 1864	1854; 1866
Samuel Farrow Rice	1853	1856
Richard Wilde Walker	1856	1866
Abram Joseph Walker	1856	1859
George W. Stone	1856; 1876	1864; 1884
William M. Byrd	1866	1867
Thomas J. Judge	1866; 1874	1867; 1876
Thomas Minott Peters	1868	1873
Benjamin F. Saffold	1868	1874
Robert C. Brickell	1873	1874
Amos R. Manning	1874	1880
Henderson M. Somerville	1880	1890
Jonathan Haralson	1882	1906
David Clopton	1884	1892
Thomas N. McClellan	1889	1898
Thomas W. Coleman	1890	1898
Richard Wilde Walker Jr.	1891	1892
W. S. Thorington	1892	1892
James B. Head	1892	1898
Henry A. Sharpe	1898	1904
John R. Tyson	1898	1906
James R. Dowdell	1898	1909
N. D. Denson	1904	1909
R. T. Simpson	1904	1912
John C. Anderson	1904	1914
Thomas C. McClellan	1906	1923
J. J. Mayfield	1908	1920
A. A. Evans	1909	1910
Anthony D. Sayre	1909	1931
Ormond Somerville	1911	1928
Edward deGraffenried Sr.	1912	1914
Lucien D. Gardner	1914	1940
William H. Thomas	1914	1945
Benjamin M. Miller	1920	1927
Joel B. Brown	1920; 1927	1921; 1953
Virgil Bouldin	1923	1944
Arthur B. Foster	1928	1953
Thomas E. Knight Sr.	1931	1942
J. Ed Livingston	1940	1951
Thomas S. Lawson	1942	1972
Davis F. Stakely	1943; 1946	1945; 1962
Robert Tennent Simpson Jr.	1944	1972
John L. Goodwyn	1951	1968
Preston C. Clayton	1953	1954
Pelham J. Merrill	1953	1976
James J. Mayfield	1954	1956
Norman T. Spann	1956	1957
James S. Coleman	1957	1975
Robert B. Harwood	1962	1975
John P. Kohn	1968	1968
James N. Bloodworth	1968	1980
Daniel T. McCall Jr.	1969	1975
Alva Hugh Maddox	1969	2001
Ormond Somerville Jr.	1972	1972
Richard L. Jones	1972	1991
James H. Faulkner	1973	1986
T. Eric Embry	1975	1985
Janie Shores	1975	1999
Reneau P. Almon	1975	1999
Samuel A. Beatty	1976	1989
Oscar W. Adams Jr.	1980	1993
J. Gorman Houston Jr.	1985	2005
Henry B. Steagall II	1986	1995
Mark Kennedy	1989	1999
Kenneth F. Ingram	1991	1997
Ralph Cook	1993	2001
Terry L. Butts	1995	1998
Harold See	1997	2008
Champ Lyons	1998	2011
Jean Brown	1999	2005
John H. England	1999	2001
Douglas I. Johnstone	1999	2005
R. Bernard Harwood Jr.	2001	2007
Lyn Stuart	2001	2016
Thomas A. Woodall	2001	2012
Patricia M. Smith	2005	2011
Mike Bolin	2005	2023
Tom Parker	2005	2019
Glenn Murdock	2007	2018
James Allen Main	2011	2019
Jay Mitchell	2019	2025
Bill Lewis	2025	2025
