= Mayfield =

Mayfield may refer to:

== People ==
- Mayfield (surname)

== Places ==
=== Australia ===
- Mayfield, New South Wales, a suburb of Newcastle
- Mayfield, New South Wales (Queanbeyan–Palerang)
- Mayfield, New South Wales (Shoalhaven)
- Eltham, New South Wales, formerly called Mayfield, in Lismore LGA
- Mayfield, Tasmania

=== Canada ===
- Mayfield, Edmonton, a neighborhood in Alberta
- Mayfield, New Brunswick, an unincorporated community in Charlotte County
- Mayfield, Prince Edward Island, a community on Prince Edward Island Route 13
- Rural Municipality of Mayfield No. 406, Saskatchewan

=== Ireland ===
- Mayfield, County Kildare, Ireland
- Mayfield, Cork, Ireland
  - Mayfield GAA, a Gaelic Athletic Association club

=== New Zealand ===
- Mayfield, Canterbury, a village in Canterbury
- Mayfield, Marlborough, a suburb of Blenheim

=== South Africa ===
- Mayfield, South Africa

=== United Kingdom ===
- Mayfield, East Sussex, England
- Mayfield, Edinburgh, Scotland
- Mayfield, Highland, a location in Scotland
- Mayfield, Midlothian, Scotland
- Mayfield, Northumberland, a location in England
- Mayfield, Staffordshire, England
- Mayfield, West Lothian, a location in Scotland (part of Armadale, West Lothian)
- Mayfield Playing Fields, Dundee, Scotland
- Manchester Mayfield railway station, Manchester, England

=== United States ===
- Mayfield, Arkansas
- Mayfield, California, annexed by the city of Palo Alto in 1925
  - Its train station, now California Avenue station
- Mayfield, Delaware
- Mayfield (Middletown, Delaware), listed on the National Register of Historic Places in New Castle County, Delaware
- Mayfield, Georgia
- Mayfield, Kansas
- Mayfield, Kentucky
- Mayfield, Baltimore, Maryland
- Mayfield, Michigan
- Mayfield (town), New York
  - Mayfield (village), New York, within the town of Mayfield
- Mayfield, Ohio
- Mayfield, Oklahoma
- Mayfield, Pennsylvania
- Mayfield, Tennessee, unincorporated community in Jackson County
- Mayfield, Utah
- Mayfield, Washington
- Mayfield, Wisconsin

== Other uses ==
- Mayfield, alternative name for the Marchfield (assembly)
- Mayfield (ward), electoral ward in the London Borough of Redbridge
- 2021 Mayfield tornado, a tornado that devastated much of western Kentucky, including Mayfield
  - Mayfield Consumer Products, a company whose candle factory was destroyed by the tornado
- Mayfield (Leave It to Beaver), the fictional setting for the TV program Leave It to Beaver
- Mayfield Dairy, a dairy run by Scottie Mayfield
- Mayfield Psychiatric Hospital

== See also ==
- Mayfield Park (disambiguation)
- Mayfield School (disambiguation)
- Mayfield Township (disambiguation)
- Mayfeld, a fictional character in the Star Wars franchise
