= 2000 Alabama Supreme Court election =

- November 7, 2000

5 of the 9 seats on the Supreme Court of Alabama
- Turnout: 65.85%
	First party	Second party
Party	Republican	Democratic
Seats before	5	4
Seats after	8	1
Seat change	▲3	▼3
Seats up	2	3
Races won	5	0

The 2000 Alabama Supreme Court election was held on November 7, 2000, to elect five justices to the Alabama Supreme Court. Primary elections were held on June 6, 2000. Justices serve six-year terms.

== Summary of results ==
Before election	Party	After election	Party
Perry Hooper Sr.	Rep	Roy Moore	Rep
Ralph Cook	Dem	Lyn Stuart	Rep
Champ Lyons	Rep	Champ Lyons	Rep
John H. England	Dem	Thomas A. Woodall	Rep
Alva Hugh Maddox	Dem	Robert B. Harwood Jr.	Rep
Harold See	Rep	No election	
J. Gorman Houston Jr.	Rep	No election	
Jean Brown	Rep	No election	
Douglas Johnston	Dem	No election	

== Chief Justice ==
2000 Alabama Supreme Court Chief Justice election
- November 7, 2000
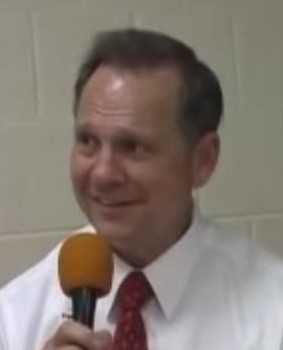

Nominee	Roy Moore	Sharon Yates
Party	Republican	Democratic
Popular vote	878,480	726,348
Percentage	54.62%	45.16%
- County results Moore: 50–60% 60–70% 70–80% Yates: 50–60% 60–70% 70–80% 80–90%
Justice before election
Perry Hooper Sr.
Republican
Elected Justice
Roy Moore
Republican

=== Republican primary ===
==== Candidates ====
===== Nominee =====
- Roy Moore, Etowah County circuit judge.

===== Eliminated in primary =====
- Harold See, incumbent Associate Justice of the Supreme Court of Alabama. (Note: Although See's seat was up for election 2002, he decided to seek the Supreme Court Chief Justice seat. This meant that he remained a Justice of the Supreme Court even though he lost the primary election.)
- Pam Baschab, judge of the Alabama Court of Criminal Appeals.
- Wayne Thorn, Jefferson County circuit judge.

===== Declined =====
- Perry Hooper Sr., incumbent Chief Justice.

==== Results ====
Results by county: Moore: 30–40%; 40–50%; 50–60%; 60–70%; 70–80%; 80–90%; See: 40–50%; 50–60%

June 6, 2000 Republican primary
Party	Candidate	Votes	%
Republican	Roy Moore	115,204	54.59%
Republican	Harold See	63,604	30.14%
Republican	Pam Baschab	17,869	8.46%
Republican	Wayne Thorn	14,369	6.81%
Total votes		211,046	100.00%

=== General election ===
==== Candidates ====
- Republican: Roy Moore, Etowah County circuit judge.
- Democratic: Sharon Yates, judge of the Alabama Court of Civil Appeals.

==== Results ====
2000 Alabama Supreme Court Chief Justice election
Party	Candidate	Votes	%
Republican	Roy Moore	878,480	54.62%
Democratic	Sharon Yates	726,348	45.16%
Write-in		3,451	0.22%
Total votes		1,608,279	100.00%
Republican hold			

== Place 1 ==
2000 Alabama Supreme Court Place 1 election
- November 7, 2000

Nominee	Lyn Stuart	Ralph Cook
Party	Republican	Democratic
Popular vote	824,895	742,946
Percentage	52.49%	47.27%
- County results Stuart: 50–60% 60–70% 70–80% Cook: 50–60% 60–70% 70–80% 80–90%
Justice before election
Ralph Cook
Democratic
Elected Justice
Lyn Stuart
Republican

=== General election ===
==== Candidates ====
- Republican: Lyn Stuart, Baldwin County circuit judge.
- Democratic: Ralph Cook, incumbent Associate Justice.

==== Results ====
2000 Alabama Supreme Court Place 1 election
Party	Candidate	Votes	%
Republican	Lyn Stuart	824,895	52.49%
Democratic	Ralph Cook (incumbent)	742,946	47.27%
Write-in		3,759	0.24%
Total votes		1,571,600	100.00%
Republican gain from Democratic			

== Place 2 ==
2000 Alabama Supreme Court Place 2 election
- November 7, 2000

Nominee	Champ Lyons	Sydney A. Smith
Party	Republican	Libertarian
Popular vote	889,547	225,969
Percentage	79.38%	20.16%
- County results Lyons: 60–70% 70–80% 80–90% 90–100% Smith: 50–60%
Justice before election
Champ Lyons
Republican
Elected Justice
Champ Lyons
Republican

Place 2 was originally held by Democratic Justice Terry L. Butts, who was elected to the position in 1994. However, Butts retired from the court in 1998 to run for Attorney General, but was defeated by William H. Pryor Jr.. Republican Governor Fob James appointed Champ Lyons to succeed him on March 23, 1998.

=== General election ===
==== Candidates ====
- Republican: Champ Lyons, incumbent Associate Justice.
- Libertarian: Sydney Albert 'Al' Smith, Elba lawyer.

==== Results ====
2000 Alabama Supreme Court Place 2 election
Party	Candidate	Votes	%
Republican	Champ Lyons (incumbent)	889,547	79.38%
Libertarian	Sydney Albert 'Al' Smith	225,969	20.16%
Write-in		5,161	0.46%
Total votes		1,120,677	100.00%
Republican hold			

== Place 3 ==
2000 Alabama Supreme Court Place 3 election
- November 7, 2000

Nominee	Thomas A. Woodall	John H. England
Party	Republican	Democratic
Popular vote	846,287	714,429
Percentage	54.16%	45.72%
- County results Woodall: 50–60% 60–70% 70–80% England: 50–60% 60–70% 70–80% 80–90%
Justice before election
John H. England
Democratic
Elected Justice
Thomas A. Woodall
Republican

Place 3 was originally held by Democratic Justice Mark Kennedy, before he retired in 1999. That same year, Democratic Governor Don Siegelman appointed John H. England to fill the remainder of Kennedy's term.

=== General election ===
==== Candidates ====
- Republican: Thomas A. Woodall, Jefferson County circuit judge.
- Democratic: John H. England, incumbent Associate Justice.

==== Results ====
2000 Alabama Supreme Court Place 3 election
Party	Candidate	Votes	%
Republican	Thomas A. Woodall	846,287	54.16%
Democratic	John H. England (incumbent)	714,429	45.72%
Write-in		1,944	0.12%
Total votes		1,562,660	100.00%
Republican gain from Democratic			

== Place 4 ==
2000 Alabama Supreme Court Place 4 election
- November 7, 2000

Nominee	Robert B. Harwood Jr.	Joel Laird
Party	Republican	Democratic
Popular vote	845,141	696,705
Percentage	54.76%	45.14%
- County results Harwood: 50–60% 60–70% 70–80% Laird: 50–60% 60–70% 70–80% 80–90%
Justice before election
Alva Hugh Maddox
Democratic
Elected Justice
Robert B. Harwood Jr.
Republican

Place 4 was held by Democratic Justice Alva Hugh Maddox, who chose not to seek reelection.

=== General election ===
==== Candidates ====
- Republican: Robert B. Harwood Jr., Tuscaloosa County circuit judge and son of Robert B. Harwood.
- Democratic: Richard Joel Laird, Calhoun County circuit judge.

==== Results ====
2000 Alabama Supreme Court Place 4 election
Party	Candidate	Votes	%
Republican	Robert B. Harwood Jr.	845,141	54.76%
Democratic	Joel Laird	696,705	45.14%
Write-in		1,502	0.10%
Total votes		1,543,348	100.00%
Republican gain from Democratic			
