= James Mayfield =

James Mayfield may refer to:

- James C. Mayfield (born c. 1856), American businessman
- James J. Mayfield (1911–1956), justice of the Supreme Court of Alabama
- J. J. Mayfield (1861–1927), justice of the Supreme Court of Alabama
