= Mayfield (surname) =

Mayfield is an English surname. Notable people with the surname include:

- Baker Mayfield (born 1995), American football player
- Brandon Mayfield (born 1966), American Muslim man erroneously linked to the 2004 Madrid train bombings
- Cleo Mayfield (1898–1954), American actress and singer
- Curtis Mayfield (1942–1999), American soul, R&B, and funk singer
- Debbie Mayfield (born 1956), American politician from Florida
- Earle B. Mayfield (1881–1964), American politician from Texas
- Edwin Mayfield (1870–1961), British international rugby union player
- Harold F. Mayfield (1911–2007), American business executive and ornithologist
- Irvin Mayfield (born 1977), American jazz musician, New Orleans
- J. C. Mayfield (born c. 1856), American businessman
- J. J. Mayfield (1861–1927), American judge, politician and educator from Alabama
- Jack Mayfield (born 1990), American baseball player
- Jalen Mayfield (born 2000), American football player
- James J. Mayfield (1911–1956), Alabama lawyer and judge
- Jeremy Mayfield (born 1969), American auto racer
- Jessica Lea Mayfield (born 1989), American singer-songwriter
- Julian Mayfield (1928–1984), American actor, director, writer, lecturer and civil rights activist
- Julie Mayfield (born 1967), American politician from North Carolina
- Katherine Mayfield (born 1958), American writer
- Maryhelen Mayfield (1946—2024), American ballet dancer and arts administrator
- Matthew Mayfield (born 1983), American singer-songwriter
- Max Mayfield (born 1948), American meteorologist
- Melvin Mayfield (1919-1990), American corporal and Medal of Honor recipient
- Percy Mayfield (1920–1984), American songwriter and singer
- Scott Mayfield (born 1992), American ice hockey player for the New York Islanders
- Scottie Mayfield (born 1950 or 1951), president of Mayfield Dairy
- Stan Mayfield (1955–2008), American politician from Florida
- Virginia Henry Mayfield (1889–1944), first female judge in Alabama
