= Sharon Yates =

American judge

Sharon Gilbert Yates

Judge of the Montgomery County District Court, Place 3
- In office January 15, 2007 – January 14, 2013
- Preceded by: Lucie McLemore
- Succeeded by: W. Troy Massey

Judge of the Alabama Court of Civil Appeals
- In office January 18, 1993 – January 17, 2005
- Preceded by: Robert J. Russell
- Succeeded by: Tommy Bryan

Personal details
- Born: November 21, 1952 (age 73)
- Party: Democratic
- Spouse: Edwin "Pete" Yates (divorced)
- Children: Nathan, Parker, Mallory
- Education: University of Alabama (BA, MA, JD)

Sharon Gilbert Yates (born November 21, 1952) is an American attorney from the state of Alabama who served as a member of the Alabama Court of Civil Appeals from 1993 to 2005. Yates was the first woman to serve on the Court of Civil Appeals. She was the Democratic Party nominee for Chief Justice of the Supreme Court of Alabama in the 2000 election, losing to Republican Roy Moore. She was defeated in her re-election campaign in the 2004 Alabama elections. Yates was elected to the Montgomery County District Court in 2006 and served a single term from 2007 to 2013.

== Early life ==
Yates was born in Alexander City, Alabama, and graduated from Benjamin Russell High School. She attended the University of Alabama, graduating with her bachelor's degree in 1975 and her master's degree in educational administration in 1976. She worked at the United States Department of Education from 1975 to 1978 in the Bureau of Post-Secondary Education, and then attended the University of Alabama School of Law, graduating in 1982.

She worked as a staff attorney to Justice Samuel A. Beatty of the Supreme Court of Alabama after graduation, and then entered private practice. She worked for Beasley & Wilson, a Montgomery-based law firm headed by former lieutenant governor Jere Beasley for three years before establishing her own practice. In 1986, while pregnant with twins, she ran for the Alabama Senate against Republican State Senator Larry Dixon in the 25th district. However, after winning the Democratic nomination, she dropped out of the race to spend time with her family. In 1989, she was appointed to the faculty of the Thomas Goode Jones School of Law in Montgomery.

== Judicial service ==
In 1992, Yates ran for the Court of Civil Appeals, challenging Judge Robert J. Russell, the first Republican to serve on the court. Yates won the Democratic nomination unopposed, and defeated Russell in the general election by a wide margin, winning 57 percent of the vote, becoming the first woman to serve on the court. She was re-elected in 1998 against Republican nominee Sarah Carlisle, a Birmingham attorney, winning 54 percent of the vote.

Yates ran for Chief Justice of the Supreme Court in 2000, but lost the general election to Republican Justice Roy Moore by a 55–45 percent margin. After the defeat of Judge Roger Monroe that year, Yates became the only Democratic member of the Court of Civil Appeals. She ran for re-election to a third term in 2004, and was narrowly defeated by Republican Tommy Bryan, winning 48 percent of the vote to Bryan's 52 percent.

In 2006, Yates ran for the Montgomery County District Court. She defeated Darryl A. Parker for the Democratic nomination, winning 74 percent of the vote, and faced incumbent Republican Judge Lucie McLemore in the general election. Yates defeated McLemore by a 57–43 percent margin, one of several Democratic victories over incumbent Republicans that year in the county. She did not seek re-election in 2012. Following her departure from the bench, Yates rejoined the faculty at the Jones School of Law, where she taught criminal law, evidence, professional responsibility, and appellate advocacy.
