= 1982 Alabama Supreme Court election =

- November 2, 1982

The 1982 Alabama Supreme Court election was held on November 2, 1982, to elect four justices to the Supreme Court of Alabama, including the chief justice. Primary elections were held on September 7, and a primary runoff election was held on September 28.

== Chief Justice ==
=== Democratic primary ===
==== Candidates ====
===== Nominee =====
- Bo Torbert, incumbent chief justice

=== General election ===
==== Results ====
1982 Alabama Supreme Court chief justice election
| Party | Candidate | Votes | % |
|---|---|---|---|
| Democratic | Bo Torbert (incumbent) | 668,627 | 100.00 |
| Total votes | | 668,627 | 100.00 |

== Place 1 ==
1982 Alabama Supreme Court election, place 1
- November 2, 1982
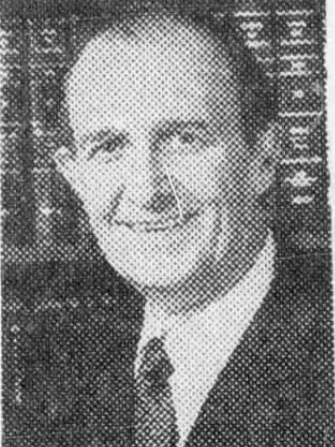

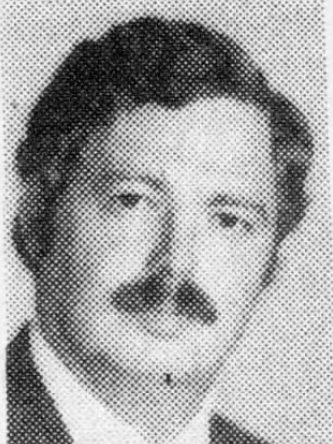
| Candidate | Hugh Maddox | Harry Lyons |
| Party | Democratic | Republican |
| Popular vote | 674,986 | 184,056 |
| Percentage | 78.6% | 21.4% |
- County results Maddox: 50–60% 60–70% 70–80% 80–90% >90%
Justice before election
Hugh Maddox
Democratic
Elected Justice
Hugh Maddox
Democratic

=== Democratic primary ===
==== Candidates ====
===== Nominee =====
- Hugh Maddox, incumbent justice

===== Eliminated in primary =====
- Lawrence A. Anderson, lawyer

==== Endorsements ====
Hugh Maddox

Newspapers

- The Selma Times-Journal

==== Results ====
Democratic primary
| Party | Candidate | Votes | % |
|---|---|---|---|
| Democratic | Hugh Maddox (incumbent) | 439,273 | 69.32 |
| Democratic | Lawrence A. Anderson | 194,423 | 30.68 |
| Total votes | | 633,696 | 100.00 |

=== Republican primary ===
==== Candidates ====
===== Nominee =====
- Harry Lyons, lawyer

=== General election ===
==== Results ====
1982 Alabama Supreme Court election, place 1
| Party | Candidate | Votes | % |
|---|---|---|---|
| Democratic | Hugh Maddox (incumbent) | 674,986 | 78.57 |
| Republican | Harry Lyons | 184,056 | 21.43 |
| Total votes | | 859,042 | 100.00 |

== Place 2 ==
1982 Alabama Supreme Court Democratic primary, place 2
- September 7, 1982
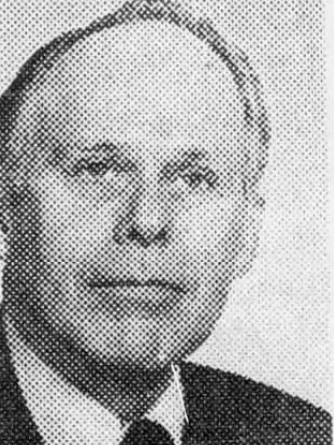

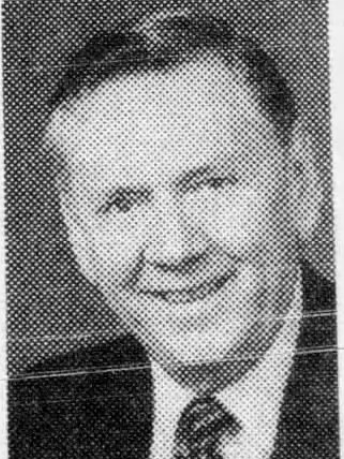
| Candidate | Sam Beatty | Claude Allison |
| Party | Democratic | Democratic |
| Popular vote | 431,912 | 179,486 |
| Percentage | 70.6% | 29.4% |
- County results Beatty: 50–60% 60–70% 70–80% 80–90%
Justice before election
Sam Beatty
Democratic
Elected Justice
Sam Beatty
Democratic

=== Democratic primary ===
==== Candidates ====
===== Nominee =====
- Sam Beatty, incumbent justice

===== Eliminated in primary =====
- Claude Allison, lawyer

==== Endorsements ====
Sam Beatty

Newspapers

- The Selma Times-Journal

==== Results ====
Democratic primary
| Party | Candidate | Votes | % |
|---|---|---|---|
| Democratic | Sam Beatty (incumbent) | 431,912 | 70.64 |
| Democratic | Claude Allison | 179,486 | 29.36 |
| Total votes | | 611,398 | 100.00 |

=== General election ===
==== Results ====
1982 Alabama Supreme Court election, place 2
| Party | Candidate | Votes | % |
|---|---|---|---|
| Democratic | Sam Beatty (incumbent) | 653,349 | 100.00 |
| Total votes | | 653,349 | 100.00 |

== Place 3 ==
1982 Alabama Supreme Court Democratic primary runoff, place 3
- September 28, 1982
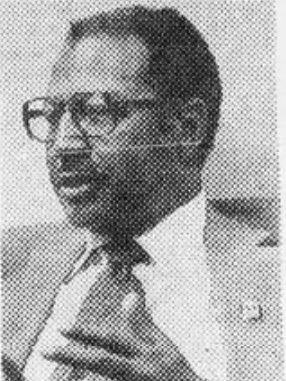

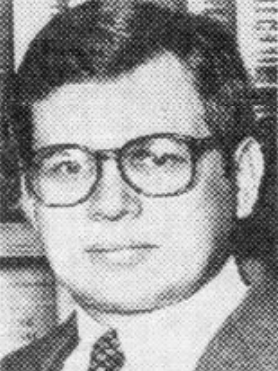
| Candidate | Oscar Adams | Jim Zeigler |
| Party | Democratic | Democratic |
| Popular vote | 436,462 | 419,789 |
| Percentage | 51.0% | 49.0% |
- County results Adams: 50–60% 60–70% 70–80% Zeigler: 50–60% 60–70%
Justice before election
Oscar Adams
Democratic
Elected Justice
Oscar Adams
Democratic

=== Democratic primary ===
==== Candidates ====
===== Nominee =====
- Oscar Adams, incumbent justice

===== Eliminated in runoff =====
- Jim Zeigler, member of the Alabama Public Service Commission (1974–1978)

===== Eliminated in primary =====
- George Williams, lawyer

==== Endorsements ====
Oscar Adams

Statewide officials

- Charles Graddick, attorney general of Alabama
- Fob James, governor of Alabama (1979–1983)

Newspapers

- The Selma Times-Journal

==== Results ====
Democratic primary
| Party | Candidate | Votes | % |
|---|---|---|---|
| Democratic | Oscar Adams (incumbent) | 303,150 | 41.81 |
| Democratic | Jim Zeigler | 229,741 | 31.69 |
| Democratic | George Williams | 192,121 | 26.50 |
| Total votes | | 725,012 | 100.00 |

==== Runoff ====
===== Results =====
Democratic primary runoff
| Party | Candidate | Votes | % |
|---|---|---|---|
| Democratic | Oscar Adams (incumbent) | 436,462 | 50.97 |
| Democratic | Jim Zeigler | 419,789 | 49.03 |
| Total votes | | 856,251 | 100.00 |

=== Republican primary ===
==== Candidates ====
===== Disqualified =====
- Tom Hayden, perennial candidate

=== General election ===
==== Results ====
1982 Alabama Supreme Court election, place 3
| Party | Candidate | Votes | % |
|---|---|---|---|
| Democratic | Oscar Adams (incumbent) | 660,153 | 100.00 |
| Total votes | | 660,153 | 100.00 |
