= James Head =

James Head may refer to:

- James Head (director), Canadian filmmaker
- James Head (fighter) (born 1984), American mixed martial artist
- James Marshall Head (1855–1930), mayor of Nashville, Tennessee
- James B. Head (1846–1902), Justice of the Alabama Supreme Court
- James W. Head, American professor and engineer
