= Silas Parsons =

American judge

Silas Parsons (c. 1800 – September 17, 1860) was a justice of the Supreme Court of Alabama from 1849 to 1851.

== Early life, education, and career ==
Born in Kentucky, Parsons was a brother of General Enoch Parsons, a lawyer in Claiborne, Alabama, who was the Whig candidate for governor in 1835, and of General Peter Parsons, for many years a prominent lawyer and politician in East Tennessee. Parsons lived for a time in east Tennessee, moving to Alabama around 1819 and first settled in Jackson County, Alabama, as a farmer. He was elected sheriff of the county in 1823, serving until 1826, and during that time he read law to gain admission to the bar.

== Legal and judicial career ==
Parsons practiced for a short time at Bellefonte, Alabama, then went to Huntsville, Alabama, in 1831, and entered a partnership with Colonel Byrd Brandon, and later with Judge Hopkins. By 1837 he was noted to be "one of the most prominent attorneys of North Alabama". He was elected the first chancellor of the northern division in 1838 by the legislature, but declined the office.

In 1849, Parsons was appointed by Governor Chapman, and later elected by the legislature, to fill the vacancy on the supreme court bench caused by the resignation of chief justice Henry W. Collier and elevation of associate justice Edmund Strother Dargan. Parsons remained on the bench for two years, then was reportedly forced by failing health to resign. He thereafter moved to Texas and resided on a plantation about ten miles from Austin, Texas.

== Personal life and death ==
Parsons married a Miss Reed, a daughter of Colonel John Reed of Madison, Alabama. They had no children.

While on a visit to Huntsville in 1860, he died, and was buried at that place.

Political offices
Preceded by Henry W. Collier	Justice of the Supreme Court of Alabama; 1849–1851	Succeeded by Daniel Coleman
