= Lyman Gibbons =

American judge (1808–1879)

Lyman Gibbons (June 3, 1808 – June 27, 1879) was a justice of the Supreme Court of Alabama from 1852 to 1854.

== Early life, education and career ==
Born in Dormansville or Westerlo, New York to John and Elizabeth (Hall) Gibbons, Lyman Gibbons graduated from Amherst College in 1830, and spent six months working at Vermont's Chelsea Academy before reading law with Jacob Collamer, then a Vermont state court judge, in Royalton, Vermont.

Gibbons moved to Mobile, Alabama in 1833, where he taught at Spring Hill College while continuing to study law. He was admitted to the bar in 1834 and entered law practice the following spring, in Claiborne, Alabama, in partnership with James Dellet. Gibbons traveled to Europe around 1845, remaining there for two years and studying civil law in France. He then returned to the United States and practiced law in New Orleans, Louisiana from 1847 until 1849, when he resumed his practice in Mobile.

== Judicial service and later life ==
In 1851, Gibbons was appointed to a vacant seat on the Alabama Sixth Judicial Circuit. He was elected to a second term in 1852, but in December of that year was appointed by Governor Henry W. Collier to a seat on the Alabama Supreme Court vacated by the resignation of Edmund S. Dargan. Gibbons served in that capacity for just over one year, resigning in January 1854; he was not replaced on the court, as the legislature had reduced the number of seats from five to three during the previous year. Gibbons returned to Monroe County to work as a planter. In 1861, he represented Monroe County as a delegate to the Constitutional Convention of 1861, which passed the ordinances of secession. After the end of the American Civil War, he resumed his legal practice.

== Personal life ==
Gibbons married the daughter of James Dellet, Emma Eugenia Dellet, in 1853. They had one child, a daughter. Gibbons died of heart disease at his summer home in Claiborne, Alabama.

Political offices
Preceded by Edmund S. Dargan	Justice of the Supreme Court of Alabama; 1852–1854	Succeeded by Seat abolished
