= 1998 Alabama Attorney General election =

- November 3, 1998

Candidate	Bill Pryor	Terry L. Butts
Party	Republican	Democratic
Popular vote	642,403	635,636
Percentage	50.26%	49.74%
- County results Pryor: 50–60% 60–70% 70–80% Butts: 50–60% 60–70% 70–80% 80–90%
Attorney General before election
Jeff Sessions
Republican
Elected Attorney General
Bill Pryor
Republican

An election was held on November 3, 1998 to elect the Alabama Attorney General. Republican incumbent Bill Pryor, who was appointed in 1997 following Jeff Sessions's resignation after winning election to the U.S. Senate, won election to a full term, narrowly defeating Democratic former Alabama Supreme Court Justice Terry L. Butts by less than one percentage point.

As of 2026, this is the closest a Democrat has come to winning election to the Alabama Attorney General's office since Jimmy Evans lost re-election in 1994.

== General election ==
=== Candidates ===
- Bill Pryor, incumbent Alabama Attorney General (1997–2004) (Republican)
- Terry L. Butts, former Alabama Supreme Court Justice (1994–1998) (Democratic)

=== Results ===
1998 Alabama Attorney General election results
Party	Candidate	Votes	%	±%
Republican	Bill Pryor	642,403	50.26%	−6.64%
Democratic	Terry L. Butts	635,636	49.74%	+6.64%
Total votes		1,278,039	100.00%	
Republican hold				
