= James Dellet =

American politician

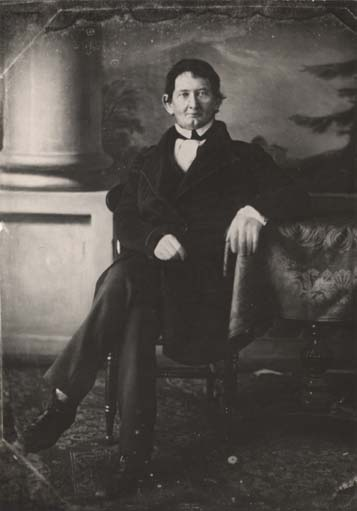
- 1840s daguerreotype of James Dellet

Member of the U.S. House of Representatives from Alabama's 1st district
- In office March 4, 1843 – March 3, 1845
- Preceded by: Reuben Chapman
- Succeeded by: Edmund S. Dargan

Member of the U.S. House of Representatives from Alabama's 5th district
- In office March 4, 1839 – March 3, 1841
- Preceded by: Francis Strother Lyon
- Succeeded by: District inactive

Speaker of the Alabama House of Representatives
- In office 1819–1819
- Preceded by: Office established
- Succeeded by: George W. Owen

Speaker of the Alabama House of Representatives
- In office 1821–1821
- Preceded by: George W. Owen
- Succeeded by: Arthur P. Bagby

Member of the Alabama House of Representatives
- In office 1819–1832

Personal details
- Born: February 18, 1788 Camden, New Jersey
- Died: December 21, 1848 (aged 60) Claiborne, Alabama
- Party: Whig

James Dellet (February 18, 1788 – December 21, 1848), was an American lawyer, planter, and politician who served as Speaker of the Alabama House of Representatives during the state's inaugural legislative session in 1819 and again in 1821. He later represented Alabama in the United States House of Representatives as a Whig, serving in the Twenty-sixth (1839–1841) and Twenty-eighth (1843–1845) Congresses. (Note: The 1819 House Journal spells his surname Dellett.)

== Biography ==
=== Early life ===
Dellet was born in Camden, New Jersey, and moved with his family to Columbia, South Carolina, in 1800. He graduated from South Carolina College (now the University of South Carolina) in 1810, studied law, was admitted to the bar in 1813, and practiced. He moved to the Alabama Territory in 1818, settling at Claiborne, where he continued to practice law and briefly served as a circuit judge.

=== State politics ===
Dellet represented Monroe County in the first state legislature following Alabama statehood and was elected the first Speaker of the House in 1819. He returned to the House in later terms and was again chosen Speaker at the November 1821 session in Cahawba. He also served additional legislative terms in the mid-1820s and early 1830s.

During his legal career at Claiborne, Dellet mentored apprentices, including William B. Travis, who studied in his office in 1828 before leaving for Texas, and Benjamin F. Porter, who later became a judge and reform advocate. In the 1830s, Dellet partnered in practice with future Alabama Supreme Court justice Lyman Gibbons, who married Dellet’s daughter Emma.

=== Congress ===
Dellet was the unsuccessful Whig candidate for Congress in 1833. He was later elected as a Whig to the Twenty-sixth Congress from Alabama’s 5th district (1839–1841) and to the Twenty-eighth Congress from the 1st district (1843–1845). He resumed the practice of law and engaged in agricultural pursuits between and after his terms.

=== Death ===
Dellet died on December 21, 1848, at Claiborne and was interred in a private cemetery at his Dellet Park plantation.

== Bibliography ==
- "DELLET, James". History, Art & Archives, U.S. House of Representatives.
- "James Dellet". Encyclopedia of Alabama. Alabama Humanities Alliance. January 31, 2012. "...first Speaker of the House of Representatives... In 1821, Dellet was reelected and again chosen as Speaker of the House."
- "Journal of the Alabama House of Representatives, October–December 1819" (PDF). Wikimedia Commons (from Internet Archive). "...James Dellett... was duly elected [Speaker] and conducted to the chair."
- "Journal of the Alabama House of Representatives, November–December 1821" (PDF). Wikimedia Commons (from Internet Archive). "...the House proceeded to the election of a Speaker; ... Mr. James Dellet was elected Speaker..."
- "Guide to the Dellet–Torrey Collection" (PDF). The Doy Leale McCall Rare Book and Manuscript Library, University of South Alabama. June 15, 2017.
- "Obituary Record: Roll of Graduates deceased during the Year 1879–1880; Deaths Not Previously Reported". Amherst College. 1880.

U.S. House of Representatives
Preceded by Francis Strother Lyon	Member of the U.S. House of Representatives from Alabama's 5th congressional district 1839–1841	Succeeded by District inactive
Preceded by Reuben Chapman	Member of the U.S. House of Representatives from Alabama's 1st congressional district 1843–1845	Succeeded by Edmund S. Dargan
