= Justice Head =

Justice Head may refer to:

- James B. Head (1846–1902), associate justice of the Supreme Court of Alabama
- T. Grady Head (1897–1965), associate justice of the Georgia Supreme Court
