= William H. Thomas (Alabama judge) =

American judge (1867–1945)

William Holcombe Thomas (June 10, 1867 – December 22, 1945) was a justice of the Supreme Court of Alabama from 1915 to 1945.

Born in Oak Bowery, Chambers County, Alabama, Thomas graduated from Emory College in Oxford, Georgia, in 1886, and read law under Judge James R. Dowdell to gain admission to the bar in 1888.

Thomas "practiced law in Lafayette in partnership with William J. Samford, who later was elected governor of Alabama". Thomas moved to Montgomery, Alabama, in 1892, and was a city court judge there from 1902 to 1909.

He was elected to succeed Justice Edward deGraffenried Sr. on the state supreme court in 1915, and was subsequently reelected until his death.

Thomas married Lula Marian McCurdy of Lowndesboro, Alabama, with whim he had one daughter. He died in Tuskegee, Alabama, while visiting the home of his daughter there, at the age of 78. He was succeeded on January 8, 1946 by the appointment of Justice Davis F. Stakely as an Associate Justice.

Political offices
Preceded by Edward deGraffenried Sr.	Justice of the Supreme Court of Alabama; 1915–1945	Succeeded by Davis F. Stakely
