= James Dowdell =

James Dowdell may refer to:

- James F. Dowdell (1818–1871), U.S. politician
- James R. Dowdell (1847–1921), U.S. jurist
