= Justice Malone =

Justice Malone may refer to:

- Charles R. Malone (born c. 1954), chief justice of the Supreme Court of Alabama
- Denis Malone (1922–2000), chief justice of Belize, acting chief justice of the Bahamas, and chief justice of the Cayman Islands

== See also ==
- Anthony William Maloney (1928–2004), justice of the Supreme Court of Ontario
