= Pelham J. Merrill =

American judge (1907–1991)

Pelham Jones Merrill (December 1, 1907 – November 5, 1991) was a justice of the Supreme Court of Alabama from 1953 to 1976.

== Early life, education, and career ==
Merrill was born in Heflin, Alabama, into a prominent Alabama family; his father, Walter B. Merrill, would also serve as a state court legislator and judge.

Merrill graduated from the University of Alabama in 1926 and received an LL.B. from the University of Alabama School of Law in 1934, thereafter entering the practice of law in Heflin. He maintained an office there until he took his seat on the Alabama Supreme Court in 1953.

== Government and military service ==
Merrill represented Cleburne County, Alabama in the Alabama State House from 1936 to 1938, and served in World War II, from June 1942 to February 1946, in the United States Army Air Corps, where he achieved the rank of major.

After the war, he remained in the Air Force Reserve, and was elected to the legislature for two additional terms, from 1947 to 1951, and from 1951 to 1952, twice serving as Speaker Pro Tem.

In 1952 Merrill was elected to a seat on the Alabama Supreme Court vacated by the retirement of Arthur B. Foster. He was thereafter re-elected in 1958, 1964, and 1970, retiring in 1976.

== Personal life ==
Merrill married Gladys Mae Morrison of West Blocton in Birmingham on August 21, 1936. In 1978, he was inducted into the Alabama Academy of Honor. He died in Montgomery, Alabama.

Political offices
Preceded by Arthur B. Foster	Justice of the Supreme Court of Alabama; 1953–1976	Succeeded by Samuel A. Beatty
