= Samuel Beatty =

Samuel Beatty may refer to:

- Samuel Beatty (general) (1820–1885), Union general of the American Civil War
- Samuel Beatty (mathematician) (1881–1970), Canadian academic, mathematician, and Chancellor
- Samuel A. Beatty (1923–2014), American jurist and educator
- Samuel Beatty Wilson, founder of Phi Gamma Delta fraternity
