= Charles R. Malone (disambiguation) =

Charles R. Malone may refer to:

- Charles R. Malone (c. 1954), American jurist
- Charles Ray Malone (born 1965), American baseball player
