= Benjamin Porter =

Benjamin Porter may refer to:

- Benjamin Curtis Porter (1843–1908), American painter
- Benjamin F. Porter (1808–1868), American politician
