= 1904 Alabama elections =

- November 8, 1904

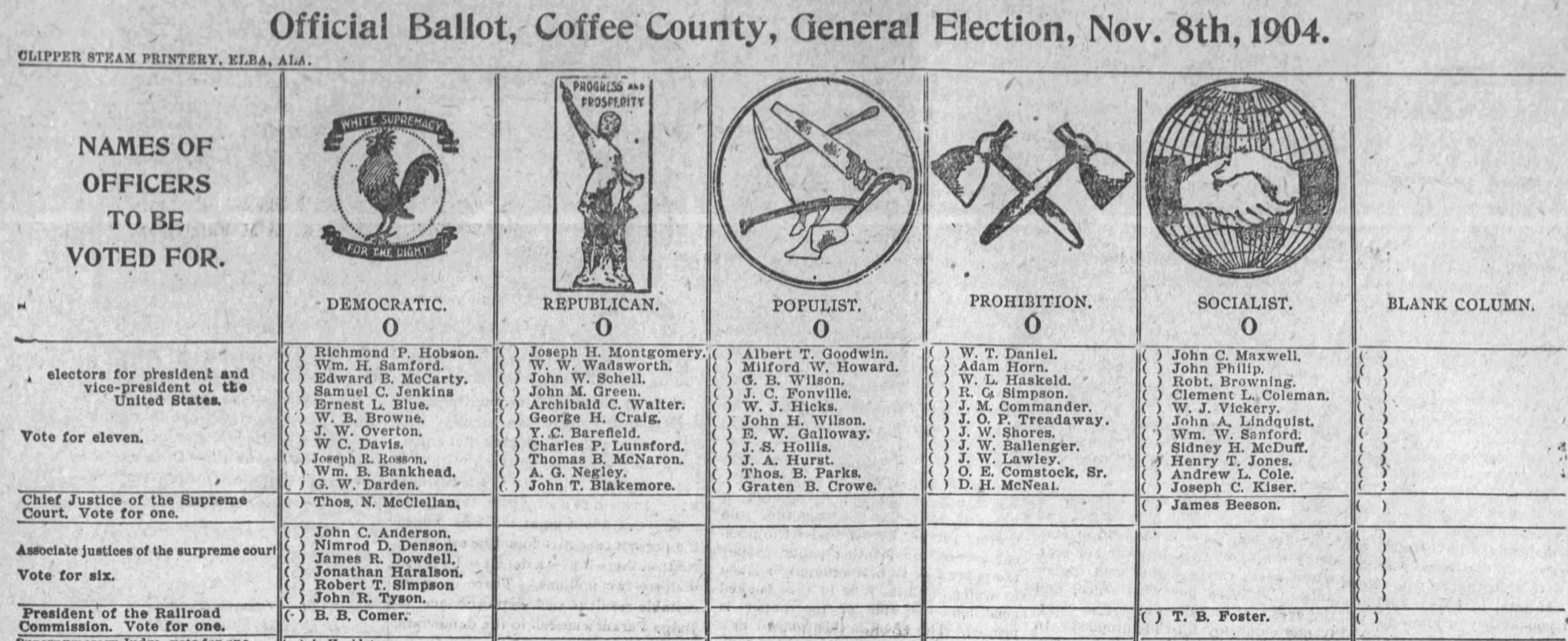
Sample ballot of the 1904 general election in Coffee County, Alabama

A general election was held in the U.S. State of Alabama on November 8, 1904, to elect candidates to various federal, state, and local offices.

Statewide elections were contested by the Democratic Party, Republican Party, Populist Party, Prohibition Party, and the Socialist Party of America.

== State offices ==
=== Railroad commission president ===
1902 Alabama Railroad Commission President election
Party	Candidate	Votes	%
Democratic	B. B. Comer	83,497	98.95%
Socialist	T. B. Foster	883	1.05%
Total votes		84,380	100.00%

=== Judicial ===
==== Supreme Court ====
Thomas N. McClellan was re-elected chief justice, and six Democrats were elected associate justice without opposition.

1902 Alabama Supreme Court chief justice election
Party	Candidate	Votes	%
Democratic	Thomas N. McClellan (inc.)	81,224	98.72%
Socialist	James Beeson	1,053	1.28%
Total votes		82,277	100.00%
