= Davis F. Stakely =

Lawyer, teacher, justice of the Supreme Court of Alabama

Davis Fonville Stakely (January 27, 1883 – January 12, 1964) was a justice of the Supreme Court of Alabama from 1943 to 1945, and again from 1946 to 1962.

== Early life, education, and career ==
Born in Augusta, Georgia, to pastor Charles A. Stakely and Sarah Jessie Stakely, he received a law degree from Mercer University in 1904, where he was also a star athlete on the Mercer baseball team. He "was at second base in every game played by the Baptist institution for four years (1901-02-03 and 04) and four times was named to the All-Southern Intercollegiate team".

In 1905, he was elected to the faculty of Howard College (later renamed Samford University), where he taught business methods and Latin, and where he was also head coach of the football team in 1905, and of the baseball team in 1908. Stakely entered the practice of law in Montgomery, Alabama, in 1908.

== Judicial service ==
In 1943, Governor Chauncey Sparks temporarily appointed Stakely to a seat on the state supreme court vacated by a leave of absence taken by Justice Thomas S. Lawson, who had taken an active duty role with the United States Navy during World War II.

Lawson returned to his place on the court on November 1, 1945, and Stakely left the court, returning to private practice. Less than two months later, on December 22, 1945, Justice William H. Thomas died, and on January 8, 1946, Stakely was appointed as an associate justice to succeed Thomas. Stakely successfully ran for re-election to the seat in 1946, 1952, and 1958, remaining on the court until his resignation in 1962.

== Personal life and death ==
Stakely had a wife who died before him, with whom he had a daughter and a son. He died at a Montgomery hospital at the age of 80, following a lengthy illness.

Political offices
Preceded by Thomas S. Lawson	Acting Justice of the Supreme Court of Alabama; 1943–1945	Succeeded by Thomas S. Lawson
Preceded by William H. Thomas	Justice of the Supreme Court of Alabama; 1946–1962	Succeeded by Robert B. Harwood
