= Lucien D. Gardner =

American judge

Lucien Dunbidden Gardner (November 28, 1876 – November 2, 1952) was a justice of the Alabama Supreme Court from 1914 to 1951. He served as chief justice of the Alabama Supreme Court from 1940 to 1951.

Gardner was an alumnus of Troy State University and University of Alabama School of Law.

He was elected to the Alabama State Senate in 1906. In 1914, he was appointed to a seat on the Alabama Supreme Court vacated by the elevation of C. J. Anderson to chief justice. Gardner then won election to the remainder of the term, and was reelected as a Justice in 1922, 1928, and 1934. In 1940, Governor Frank M. Dixon elevated Gardner to Chief Justice, and he won election to that office later in 1940, winning reelection again in 1946.

In an anti-miscegenation case ruling in Alabama, Gardner stated that "It is reprehensible enough for a white man to live in adultery with a white woman thus defying the laws of God and man, but it is more so, and a much lower grade of depravity, for a white man to live in adultery with a Negro woman."

During the 1948 presidential election campaign, Gardner's court made a landmark ruling that Alabama's presidential electors can never be required to vote for any party's national nominee. This excluded both current incumbent President Harry S. Truman and 1964 incumbent Lyndon Baines Johnson from ballot access in Alabama.

He married Henrietta Wiley of Troy, Alabama. His son, Lucien D. Gardner, Jr., grandson, William F. Gardner, and great-grandson, Robert T. Gardner, also became lawyers. Gardner was a Baptist.

Gardner died in a hospital in Montgomery, Alabama, at the age of 76, following a period of ill health, and six months after the death of his wife.

== Sources ==
- Digital Archives entry
- Alabama government bio of Gardner
- Political Graveyard entry for Gardner

Political offices
Preceded by John C. Anderson	Chief Justice of the Supreme Court of Alabama; 1940–1951	Succeeded by J. Ed Livingston
