= Henry Minor =

American judge (1783–1839)

Henry Minor (January 4, 1783 – January 1, 1839) was an American jurist who served as a justice of the Supreme Court of Alabama from 1823 to 1825.

== Biography ==
Born in Dinwiddie County, Virginia, Minor "was carefully educated" and "read law under his uncle, Judge Minor of Fredericksburg, Virginia". He eventually moved to Huntsville, Alabama, where he "served on the first University of Alabama Board of Trustees", from 1821 to 1823, and "was elected to the first legislature of the state". In 1820, he was a member of the Electoral College in the 1820 presidential election, voting for James Monroe and Daniel D. Tompkins. He also served as the first reporter of decisions for the state supreme court, and following the death of Judge Henry Y. Webb in September 1823, Minor was elected to Webb's seat on the court.

Minor was then succeeded, "as soon as the General Assembly convened in December 1823", by the appointment of John Gayle. However, when Chief Justice Clement Comer Clay resigned that same month, and Abner Smith Lipscomb was elevated to chief justice, Minor was elected to fill Clay's seat. In 1825, the court was reconfigured by the legislature; Minor "was not suited to the pioneer campaign spirit needed to gain votes", and therefore was not among the judges elected by the legislature to the newly configured court. Instead, Minor "was made clerk of the Supreme Court, the fees supporting the office being more than a judge's salary", and remained in that office until his death in 1839.

In his personal life, on September 14, 1809, Minor married Frances Throckmorton in Petersburg, Virginia, with whom he had seven daughters and five sons. Upon his death at the age of 55, the Supreme Court of Alabama published an obituary and decreed that the judges would wear a badge of mourning for the remainder of the term.

Political offices
Preceded by Henry Y. Webb; Clement Comer Clay	Justice of the Supreme Court of Alabama; 1823–1823; 1823–1825	Succeeded by John Gayle; Court reconfigured
