= John P. Kohn =

American judge (1902–1993)

John Peter Kohn Jr. (December 27, 1902 – November 27, 1993) was a justice of the Supreme Court of Alabama from May to November 1968.

Born in Montgomery, Alabama, Kohn received his law degree from the University of Alabama in 1925. He served in the United States Army during World War II, and thereafter served as county attorney for Montgomery County until 1964.

A 1963 letter from Kohn to gubernatorial advisor J. Kirkman Jackson cautioned the governor not to "go over the tight line" set by United States District Judge Seybourn Harris Lynne in enjoining governor George Wallace from preventing African-American students from enrolling at the University of Alabama.

In May 1968 Governor Lurleen Wallace appointed Kohn to a seat on the Alabama Supreme Court vacated by the death of Justice John L. Goodwyn, until the election to fill the seat later that year.

Political offices
Preceded by John L. Goodwyn	Justice of the Supreme Court of Alabama; 1968–1968	Succeeded by James N. Bloodworth
