= N. D. Denson =

American judge (1856–1927)

Associate Justice of the Supreme Court of Alabama
- In office 1904–1909

Member of the Alabama House of Representatives
- In office 1888

Member of the Alabama Senate
- In office 1884–1887

Personal details
- Born: Nimrod Davis Denson; June 20, 1856 Russell County, Alabama, US
- Died: March 25, 1927 (aged 70) Columbus, Georgia, US
- Spouse: Carrie E. Vernon (m. 1883)
- Children: 4

Nimrod Davis "N. D." Denson (June 20, 1856 – March 25, 1927) was an associate justice of the Supreme Court of Alabama from 1904 to 1909.

== Biography ==
Born in Russell County, Alabama, he moved to LaFayette, Alabama following the death of his father, in 1871.>

He attended the Agricultural and Mechanical College of Alabama from 1873 to 1874, but never completed the course of study. He read law under the supervision of his brother, Colonel William H. Denson to be admitted to the bar in the Chancery Court, before Chancellor N. S. Graham, beginning active practice in 1877. He served in the Alabama Senate from 1884 to 1887, and was elected to the Alabama State House in 1888. He was elected judge of Alabama's Fifth Circuit in 1892. In 1904 he was appointed to the Supreme Court of Alabama, serving until his resigned in September 1909. He then returned to private practice in LaFayette.

Denson married Carrie E. Vernon, of Cusseta, Alabama on December 19, 1883, with whom he had two sons and two daughters.

N. D. Denson died in Columbus, Georgia on March 25, 1927.

Political offices
Preceded by Newly reorganized court	Justice of the Supreme Court of Alabama; 1904–1909	Succeeded by A. A. Evans
