= Daniel T. McCall Jr. =

American judge

Daniel Thompson McCall Jr. (March 12, 1909 – December 4, 2000) was a justice of the Supreme Court of Alabama from 1969 to 1975.

== Early life, education, and military service ==
Born in Butler, Alabama, to Daniel Thompson McCall and Caroline Winston Bush McCall, McCall graduated from the University Military School in Mobile in 1927, then received a B.A. from the University of Alabama in 1931, and an LL.B. from the same institution in 1933. He entered the private practice of law in Alabama, which was interrupted by service in the United States Navy during World War II, from 1943 to 1945. After the war, he returned to the practice of law.

== Judicial service ==
In 1960, McCall won election to a seat on the 13th Judicial Circuit of Alabama, in Mobile, where he remained until October 1969, when Governor Albert Brewer "appointed Alva Hugh Maddox and Daniel T. McCall, Jr., to fill the two newly created Associate Justice positions". McCall was re-elected to the court in 1970, and did not run for reelection in 1974, so that "[i]n 1975, Justices Coleman, Harwood, and McCall retired at the expiration of their respective terms".

== Personal life and death ==
On April 3, 1937, McCall married Mary Edna Montgomery of Anniston, Alabama, with whom he had two daughters and one son.

McCall died at the age of 91.

Political offices
Preceded by Newly established seat	Justice of the Supreme Court of Alabama; 1969–1975	Succeeded by Reneau P. Almon
