= Preston C. Clayton =

American judge (1903–1996)

Preston Copeland Clayton (September 23, 1903 – June 20, 1996) was a justice of the Supreme Court of Alabama from 1953 to 1954.

Born in Eufaula, Alabama, Clayton enrolled at the University of Alabama at the age of 16, and received a B.A. there in 1924. He read law under Judge Walter B. Jones to gain admission to the bar in 1931.

He served in the Alabama Senate from 1939 to 1953, and served in the U.S. Army in World War II, attaining the rank of lieutenant colonel, and commanded an artillery unit in the Italian and North African campaigns.

In 1953, Governor Gordon Persons appointed Clayton to a seat on the Supreme Court of Alabama vacated by the death of Joel B. Brown.

Clayton raised pure-bred Arabian horses as a hobby, and organized and lead organizations for Arabian horse enthusaists.

Clayton married Jewel Gladys Robinson of Clio in 1933, with whom he had three daughters and one son. He died at his home in Clayton, Alabama, at the age of 92.

Political offices
Preceded by Joel B. Brown	Justice of the Supreme Court of Alabama; 1953–1954	Succeeded by James J. Mayfield
