= James N. Bloodworth =

American judge (1921–1980)

Justice of the Supreme Court of Alabama
- In office 1968–1980
- Preceded by: John P. Kohn
- Succeeded by: Oscar W. Adams Jr.

Personal details
- Born: James Nelson Bloodworth; January 21, 1921 Decatur, Alabama, U.S.
- Died: December 28, 1980 (aged 59) Birmingham, Alabama, U.S.
- Party: Democratic
- Spouse: Jean Gregg
- Children: 3
- Education: University of Alabama (BS); University of Alabama School of Law (LLB)
- Profession: Judge

Military service
- Allegiance: United States
- Branch/service: United States Army
- Rank: Lieutenant colonel
- Battles/wars: World War II

James Nelson Bloodworth (January 21, 1921 – December 28, 1980) was a justice of the Supreme Court of Alabama from 1968 to 1980.

== Early life, education, and career ==
Born in Decatur, Alabama, Bloodworth received a B.S. from the University of Alabama School of Commerce and Business Administration in 1942, and entered the United States Army the following year, serving in World War II. He received an LL.B. from the University of Alabama School of Law in 1947. Bloodworth began the practice of law in Decatur, working in that field for eleven years, and also serving on the state Board of Pardons, and as a judge of the Decatur Recorder's Court from 1948 to 1951. Bloodworth remained in the U.S. Army Reserve following his military service, ultimately retiring from service as a lieutenant colonel.

== Judicial service ==
In 1958, Bloodworth was elected as a circuit judge of the Alabama Eighth Judicial Circuit, and was reelected to that position in 1964. In November 1968, he ran for a seat on the Alabama Supreme Court vacated by the death of John L. Goodwyn, the seat having been filled in the interim by the appointment of John P. Kohn. In support of his candidacy, Bloodworth "visited every courthouse in the state". After winning the nomination of the Democratic Party, he was unopposed in the general election. He was reelected to a full term in 1970, and again in 1976, but retired from the bench in September 1980 due to health problems.

== Personal life and death ==
James Nelson Bloodworth married Jean Gregg of Decatur, with whom he had three daughters, all of whom survived him.

Bloodworth died three months later in a hospital in Birmingham, Alabama, at the age of 59.

Political offices
Preceded by John P. Kohn	Justice of the Supreme Court of Alabama; 1968–1980	Succeeded by Oscar W. Adams Jr.
