= Ormond Somerville =

American judge (1868–1928)

Ormond Somerville (November 26, 1868 – September 8, 1928) was a justice of the Supreme Court of Alabama from 1911 until his death in 1928.

== Early life, education, and career ==
Born in Tuscaloosa, Alabama, to son of Henderson M. and Cornelia Banks Somerville, his father was an associate justice of the Alabama supreme court. Somerville was educated in the public schools of Tuscaloosa, and received an A.B. from the University of Alabama in 1887, later receiving an A.M. and an LL.B. from the same institution. He was instructor in Latin and English and from 1896 to 1909 was a professor of law at the university, with particular expertise in the law of evidence. In 1890 he began the practice of law, and was appointed as a county solicitor. In 1895, he partnered with C. B. Verner. In addition to practicing law, the two published a daily newspaper, the Tuscaloosa Gazette.

== Judicial service ==
In 1910, Somerville ran for a seat on the state supreme court vacated by the resignation of Justice A. A. Evans. to which Somerville was handily elected, thereafter running unopposed for reelection in 1916 and 1922. He received the Democratic nomination again in May 1928, but died before the general election.

Somerville served unto his death in 1928, and "was succeeded by Arthur B. Foster on September 10, 1928".

== Personal life and death ==
Somerville "enjoyed poetry and music and was adept at playing the flute".

In 1892, Somerville married Kate Walter, with whom he had one daughter. Kate died in 1895, and in 1898 Somerville remarried to Bessie Randolph, with whom he had had two children. His son, Ormond Somerville Jr., later also served on the state supreme court.

Somerville died suddenly in his office at the Alabama state capitol at the age of 59, having suffered from impaired health for the preceding year and a half, but having more recently appeared to be improving.

Political offices
Preceded by A. A. Evans	Justice of the Supreme Court of Alabama; 1911–1928	Succeeded by Arthur B. Foster
