= Daniel Coleman (judge) =

American judge (1801–1857)

Daniel Coleman (August 2, 1801 – November 4, 1857) was an American jurist who served as a justice of the Supreme Court of Alabama in 1851.

== Life and career ==
Born in Caroline County, Virginia, Coleman left home at the age of sixteen, his father's death having reduced the family to poverty. taught school for a year at the Kanawha Salt Works in Kentucky, and used the money thus obtained to attend Transylvania University in Lexington. He then obtained employment as a scribe at a court in Frankfort, Kentucky, and read law under the supervision of Judge Jesse Bledsoe. In 1819 Coleman moved to Alabama, settling in Mooresville, Limestone County, Alabama, where he opened a law office. In 1822, he was chosen by the state legislature to serve as judge of the Limestone County court; though he was only nineteen years old, "the gravity of his deportment led no one to question his majority, and he held the office several years". In 1829 he represented Limestone County in the state legislature.

In 1835 he was elected by the legislature to serve as a judge of the Alabama 8th judicial circuit, continuing in this office for twelve years. In June 1851, Governor Henry W. Collier appointed Coleman to a seat on the Supreme Court of Alabama vacated by Silas Parsons. However, he only served for six months, and "declined a candidacy before the Legislature, feeling that his enfeebled health would not permit him to undergo the labors of the post". He retired to Athens, Alabama. In December 1851, Coleman was elected as one of several vice presidents of the Alabama State Colonization Society, a group formed "to promote the emigration of free persons of color of this State to Liberia".

== Personal life and death ==
Coleman was a conspicuous member of the Methodist Episcopal Church, South. His wife, a native of South Carolina, survived her husband many years, and died at Athens, February 14, 1885. Their children included Reverend James L. Coleman; Daniel Coleman, an attorney; John Hartwell Coleman, also an attorney; Richard H. Coleman, who was killed during the American Civil War; and Dr. Ruffin Coleman, who studied medicine at the University of Nashville, Tennessee.

Coleman died at Athens at the age of 56.

Political offices
Preceded by Silas Parsons	Justice of the Supreme Court of Alabama; 1851	Succeeded by John Dennis Phelan
