= Henry A. Sharpe =

American judge (1848–1919)

Henry Augustus Sharpe (June 10, 1848 – August 10, 1919) was an American jurist who served as a justice of the Supreme Court of Alabama from 1898 to 1904.

== Early life, education, and career ==
Born in Alabama, he was "educated in the common schools", and received an LL.B. from Cumberland University, Lebanon, Tennessee, in 1870. Sharpe "began his studies for the law at an early age and soon won prominence in his profession". He represented Somerville, Alabama in the Alabama House of Representatives for one term, from 1878 to 1879. In November 1881, he moved to Birmingham, Alabama, where he continued the practice of law until 1884.

== Judicial service ==
In 1884, Governor Edward A. O'Neal appointed Sharpe to the newly created city court of Birmingham. Sharpe was reelected to the seat in 1886, and again in 1892, and after 1891 served as the senior presiding judge of Jefferson County, Alabama. In 1897, it was reported that he "has not seemed inclined to enter a contest for a seat on the higher bench", but in October 1897, his candidacy for the state supreme court was announced. Sharpe was one of four new justices, following an election that substantially remade the court. After serving for six years on the state supreme court, he declined to run for a seat on the newly reorganized court in 1904. He again served as presiding judge of Jefferson County, Alabama, remaining in that office until his death.

== Personal life and death ==
Sharpe died at the age of 71 in the Pittsburgh, Pennsylvania, home of one of his four daughters, whom Sharpe and his wife had been visiting for several weeks. His wife, noted for her humanitarian work, died 22 years later, in July 1941.

Political offices
Preceded by Court substantially reconfigured	Justice of the Supreme Court of Alabama; 1898–1904	Succeeded by Newly reorganized court
