= Henry B. Steagall II =

American politician (1922–1999)

Justice of the Supreme Court of Alabama
- In office May 1, 1986 – January 16, 1995
- Preceded by: James H. Faulkner
- Succeeded by: Terry L. Butts

Member of the Alabama House of Representatives
- In office 1954–1970

Personal details
- Born: Henry Bascom Steagall II; September 4, 1922 Abbeville, Alabama, U.S.
- Died: November 20, 1999 (aged 77)
- Spouse: Francis Rector
- Children: 3
- Relatives: Henry B. Steagall (uncle)
- Education: Auburn University; University of Alabama (JD)
- Occupation: Politician, judge

Military service
- Allegiance: United States
- Branch/service: United States Navy
- Battles/wars: World War II

Henry Bascom Steagall II (September 4, 1922 – November 20, 1999) was a justice of the Supreme Court of Alabama from 1986 to 1995.

== Early life, education, and military service ==
Born in Abbeville, Alabama, to Susan Koonce Steagall and Orlando Marvin Steagall, he was a nephew of Congressman Henry B. Steagall, for whom he was named. Steagall attended Auburn University, from which he took leave to enlist in the United States Navy, where he became an officer, serving for three years in the Pacific Theater of World War II. After the war, he completed his degree at Auburn, and thereafter received a J.D. from the University of Alabama School of Law in 1951, where he served on the Alabama Law Review Editorial Board.

== Political and judicial career ==
Steagall entered the practice of law in 1951. He served as State Bar Commissioner for the 33rd Judicial Circuit, and represented Dale County, Alabama, in the Alabama House of Representatives from 1954 to 1970.

From 1975 to 1979, he was executive secretary to Governor George Wallace and was State Finance Director from 1983 to 1986. In April 1986, Governor Wallace appointed Steagall to a seat on the Alabama Supreme Court vacated by the retirement of Justice James H. Faulkner, with the appointment becoming effective as of May 1, 1986, and Steagall was subsequently elected to a full term on the court in 1988. Steagall chose not run for reelection in 1994, retiring from the court on January 16, 1995.

== Personal life and death ==
Steagall married Francis Rector of Chilhowie, Virginia, with whom he had two sons and a daughter. He died after an extended illness at the age of 77.

Political offices
Preceded by James H. Faulkner	Justice of the Supreme Court of Alabama; 1986–1995	Succeeded by Terry L. Butts
