= Reneau P. Almon =

American judge (1937–2012)

Reneau Pearson Almon (July 8, 1937 – April 30, 2012) was a justice of the Supreme Court of Alabama from 1975 to 1999.

He received a B.A. from the University of Alabama followed by a law degree from the Samford University's Cumberland School of Law. After practicing law for a time in Moulton, Alabama, he was appointed as a circuit judge by Governor George Wallace, in 1966. In 1969, Governor Albert Brewer elevated Almon to a seat on the Alabama Court of Appeals, to which he was elected to a full term the following year.

He was on the Court of Criminal Appeals at the time of his election to the state supreme court.

The Judiciary of Alabama notes that: "In 1975, Justices Coleman, Harwood, and McCall retired at the expiration of their respective terms. Those vacant Associate Justice positions were filled by Reneau P. Almon, Janie L. Shores, and T. Eric Embry, who were all elected to their positions and who took office effective January 21, 1975". Almon and Shores, having begun the same day, then both served for 24 years, retiring in 1999.

In later life, Almon was diagnosed with Alzheimer's disease, among other health challenges. He died at Brookwood Hospital in Birmingham, Alabama, at the age of 74.

Almon and his wife Debbie had three sons, Jonathan, Jason, and Tommy.

Political offices
Preceded by Daniel T. McCall Jr.	Justice of the Supreme Court of Alabama; 1975–1999	Succeeded by Douglas Inge Johnstone
