= Charles T. Mohr =

German pharmacist and botanist (1824–1901)

Charles Theodor Mohr
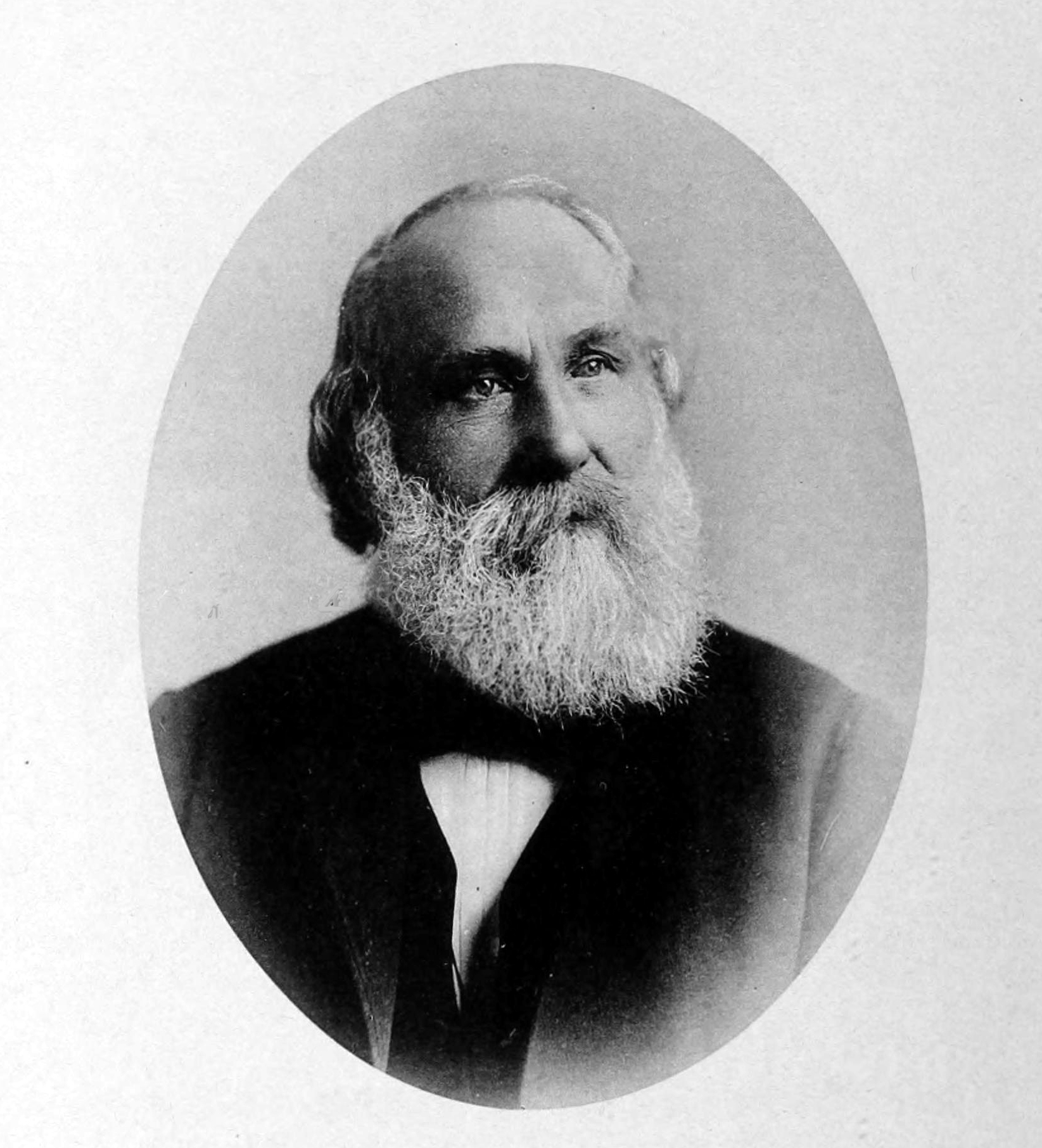
- Born: December 28, 1824; Esslingen am Neckar, Kingdom of Württemberg
- Died: July 17, 1901 (aged 76)
- Scientific career
- Fields: Pharmacy; Botany
- Workplaces: Harvard University

Charles Theodor Mohr (Karl Theodor Mohr; December 28, 1824 – July 17, 1901) was a pharmacist and botanist of German descent who lived and worked in the United States.

== Early life ==
Born in Esslingen am Neckar, Kingdom of Württemberg, Mohr was the fourth child of lamb farmer August Ludwig Mohr (1795-1833) and Dorothea Catharina Friederica (née Walker). The first three years of school, Mohr spent at the boys' school (paedegogium) of his home town. In 1833 the family moved to nearby Denkendorf where August Mohr founded a mustard and vinegar factory. Later that year, on September 10, August Mohr suddenly died at the age of 38.

Early in life, Mohr worked in the family business. He developed an interest in botany through his great-uncle, a forester at the Denkendorf convent, and his uncle's son, a student at the agricultural college in Hohenheim. Through the self-study of several books on botany, Mohr furthered his knowledge in this area and developed a taste for natural science. Following his mother's wishes, he attended the Polytechnical school in Stuttgart in autumn of 1842. There he studied chemistry under Professor Hermann von Fehling and learned the plant world of the tropics in the greenhouses of the imperial court garden where his childhood friend, Wilhelm Hochstetter, was an apprentice.

After finishing his studies, Karl was invited on a trip to Surinam by the explorer August Kappler. In November 1845 the two departed from the port on the island of Texel aboard the ship "Natalie." After a dangerous voyage, they reached New Guinea in mid-March 1846. From Paramaribo they went into the interior of the country, where Mohr collected plants for European florists and herbariums. Severe fever attacks struck Mohr and tied him to a sick bed for several months, so he felt compelled to follow the advice of the doctors and returned home in November 1846.

Back home, the botanist Professor Hochstetter (father of Mohr's friend Wilheim) arranged a job for Mohr as chemist in his son's factory in Brno. In April 1847, Mohr assumed his new position, which he soon lost when the factory closed during the revolution of 1848. Mohr left Brno and traveled with his brother Paul Heinrich, who had been living in London for some time. They met in August 1848 and decided to immigrate to the United States.

== In the United States ==
The brothers reached New York City by ship and went to Cincinnati where Mohr worked for a while in a German chemical company. On 3 March 1849, hit with gold fever, he set out with a group of 50 men for the gold mines of California, where they searched for gold on the slopes of the Sierra Nevada in the Yuba Valley. The strenuous work of a gold miner and the continuous standing in cold water worsened his health. So, in December 1850, he traveled back to Cincinnati. On this trip, he met Duke Paul Wilhelm of Württemberg, who was returning from an expedition.

After Mohr worked for a short time as a farmer in Indiana, he moved to Louisville and married a countrywoman from Zweibrücken, Sofie Roemer, on 12 March 1852. In Louisville he again met several friends from Württemberg and made contact with several German pharmacists. Here Mohr again found more time for his botanical studies, which were supported by the Swiss paleobotanist and bryologist Leo Lesquereux.

For health reasons, Mohr decided in 1857 to go south of the United States and worked as a pharmacist in Vera Cruz and Orizaba, Mexico. He wanted to become independent, but the Mexican Revolution forced him to return again the United States.

== Back in the United States ==
At the end of 1857, he opened the first German pharmacy in Mobile, Alabama whose business development was hurt by the outbreak of the American Civil War. The confederate government tasked him with examining the medicines for their army. During the course of the war, his pharmacy was destroyed once, but he immediately built it up again. Despite these troubled times, Mohr continued his botanical work and contributed a collection of mosses from southern Alabama to Lesquereux's 1884 work Mosses of North America. In his pharmacy laboratory, Mohr began examination of fertilizers and minerals, as well as exploring the woods of Alabama for commercial timbers and other valuable natural resources. The results of this work was publicized in 1879 under the title "The Forests of Alabama and Their Products".

On behalf of the Department of Agriculture in Washington, D.C., who took notice of Mohr's work, he undertook a wide-reaching forest-botanical study. Aside from this, he was busy working for Harvard University and other institutions, giving talks at large congresses and conducting a topographical examinations of north Florida in 1882. All this work demanded so much from him that his now-grown son had completely taken over the pharmacy since Mohr's health had been overstrained by his exploration work. He was given an honorary doctoral degree by the University of Alabama in 1893 in recognition of his work. In 1900, he moved to Asheville, North Carolina, where he worked on the large Biltmore Herbarium while compiling his beloved "Economic Botany of Alabama", about weeds, medicinal-, poisonous- and commercial-plants. He died on July 17, 1901. Mohr wrote many articles and botanical works which appeared in the German-language Pharmaceutische Rundschau in New York.

== Legacy ==
His publication Plant Life of Alabama, which took over 40 years, was at the same time his most meaningful work.

After some preliminary historical material, in which the work of such pioneers as Bartram, Buckley, Gates, Peters, Beaumont, and Nevius, are fully noted, the general physiographic features of the state are presented under topography and geology, river systems, and climate. Then follows an account of the general principles of plant distribution, the significance of life zones and of plant associations and formations being explained. These principles are then applied to the flora of Alabama, which is presented in its general character and distribution. The ecologic relations are considered under the following titles: forest flora, open land or campestrian flora, water and swamp flora, organotopic flora (epiphytic, saprophytic, parasitic, and insectivorous plants), and introduced plants and their influence on native plant associations.

It appeared in Montgomery two weeks after his death, and is significant for the economic development of the southern states. On the occasion of the 100-year anniversary of the geology department of the University of Alabama in 1948, Charles Theodore Mohr's life and work were recognized along with other predominant explorers, as he was a pioneer in his field of expertise for America.

== Sources ==
- UNC Herbarium
- IPNI database—accessed 30 May 2006
