= Moores Bridge, Alabama =

Moores Bridge
- Unincorporated community
- Location within Alabama Location within the United States
- Coordinates: 33°26′55″N 87°47′37″W
- Country: United States
- State: Alabama
- County: Tuscaloosa
- Elevation: 285 ft (87 m)
- Time zone: UTC-6 (Central (CST))
  - Summer (DST): UTC-5 (CDT)
- Area codes: 205, 659
- GNIS feature ID: 158874

Moores Bridge, also spelled Moors Bridge, is an unincorporated community in Tuscaloosa County, Alabama, United States. Moores Bridge is located along Alabama State Route 171, 24 miles (39 km) north-northwest of Tuscaloosa.

== History ==
Moores Bridge is named for the bridge built by Duncan Taney Moore over the Sipsey River. A post office operated under the name Moores Bridge from 1853 to 1966.

== Notable person ==
- J. J. Mayfield (1861–1927), judge, politician and educator.
