= Virgil Bouldin =

American judge (1866–1949)

Virgil Bouldin (October 20, 1866 – July 30, 1949) was a justice of the Supreme Court of Alabama from 1923 to 1944.

Educated in the public schools of Jackson County, Alabama, Bouldin received a B.A. from Winchester Normal College, in Winchester, Tennessee, and graduated from Cumberland School of Law in Lebanon, Tennessee, in 1889, gaining admission to the bar that same year.

Bouldin returned to Scottsboro to practice law, and represented Jackson County in the Alabama House of Representatives in 1896, He served on the Jackson County Democratic executive committee from 1890 to 1902, and on the state Democratic executive committee from 1907 to 1910, and from 1915 to 1916.

He served as a private in the United States Army in the Spanish-American War, in the 2nd Alabama Volunteer Infantry Regiment.

He then returned to Jackson County "to devote himself to his law practice and his banking and lumber interests".

On September 25, 1923, Governor William W. Brandon appointed Bouldin to a seat on the state supreme court vacated by the resignation of Justice Thomas C. McClellan, effective October 1, 1923.

Bouldin served on the court for 21 years, retiring to supernumerary status effective May 1, 1944.

In 1895, Bouldin married Irene Jacoway, of Dardanelle, Arkansas, with whom he had three children, including one son and one daughter who survived him. Bouldin died at his home in Scottsboro, Alabama, at the age of 82, and was buried at Scottsboro's Cedar Hill Cemetery. At the time of his death, he was the only living former supreme court justice in the state.

Political offices
Preceded by Thomas C. McClellan	Justice of the Supreme Court of Alabama; 1923–1944	Succeeded by Robert Tennent Simpson Jr.
