= Sue Bell Cobb =

American judge (born 1956)

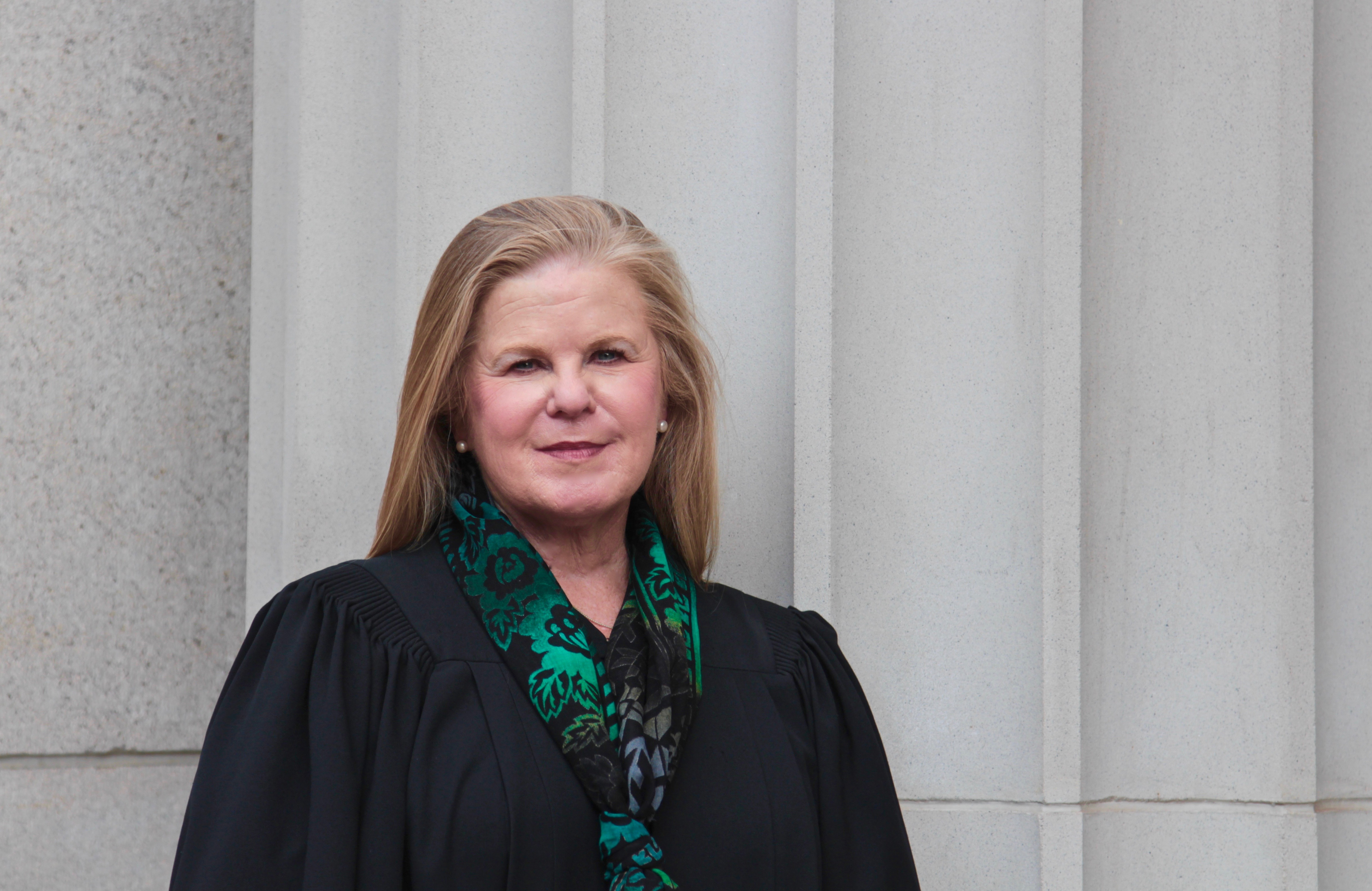

25th Chief Justice of the Alabama Supreme Court
- In office 2007–2011
- Preceded by: Drayton Nabers Jr.
- Succeeded by: Chuck Malone

Personal details
- Born: March 1, 1956 (age 70) Louisville, Kentucky, U.S.
- Party: Democratic
- Children: Caitlin Cobb
- Education: University of Alabama, Tuscaloosa (BA, JD)
- Website: Campaign website

Sue Bell Cobb (born March 1, 1956) is an American jurist and former chief justice of the Alabama Supreme Court, the first woman to hold that office in Alabama's history. In 2018 she unsuccessfully ran for governor of Alabama losing in the primary to Tuscaloosa mayor Walt Maddox receiving 30 percent of the vote compared to his 52 percent.

== Early life and career ==
Cobb was born in Louisville, Kentucky. She graduated from Sparta Academy and the University of Alabama with a degree in history. She received the Phi Alpha Theta Scholarship Key. Cobb attended the University of Alabama School of Law, graduating with a Juris Doctor in 1981. In law school Cobb was a member of the Bench and Bar Honor Society, Farrah Law Society, and Moot Court Board.

Cobb was appointed as a judge of Conecuh County District Court immediately after being admitted to the bar. Formerly one of the state's youngest judges, she was elected to the district court in 1982 and re-elected in 1988.

As a trial judge, Cobb took assignments from about 40 counties. In 1997, Cobb was appointed by the Alabama Supreme Court to serve as the Alternate Chief Judge of the Court of the Judiciary.

In 2004, Cobb served as an appellate court judge during the appeals case of Anthony Ray Hinton for his 1985 murder conviction. Though Hinton's 2004 appeal was denied at the time, Cobb was one of the presiding judges that thought he deserved a new trial. Cobb noted "I had never been so convinced of someone’s innocence than I had in Mr. Hinton’s case after reviewing all of the evidence", elaborating that "there were no fingerprints. ... When you looked at the ballistics expert that the defense had hired, he was woefully inadequate." Hinton's conviction was eventually overturned and he was freed after 30 years in prison on April 3, 2015.

== Chief Justice ==
=== Campaign and election ===
Cobb served as Alabama's Chief Justice from 2007 until her resignation in August 2011. She was the first woman elected to this post and had previously served from 1995 to 2007 as a judge on the Alabama Court of Criminal Appeals, the state court for criminal intermediate appeals. Before 1995, she had served as a trial judge in state district court for many years.

Cobb, a Democrat, was the only member of her party to serve on the Alabama Supreme Court at that time. Elected in 2006, she unseated Judge Drayton Nabers Jr., a Republican who in 2003 had succeeded Justice Roy Moore after Moore had been removed from the bench regarding his role in the display of the Ten Commandments in the courthouse. The race achieved notoriety for its cost; including the primary, the candidates raised over $8.3 million.

=== Rulings ===
On November 2, The Alabama Supreme Court, in an 8–1 vote, struck down a 2003 circuit court ruling that ExxonMobil Corp owed the state $3.6 billion in punitive damages. All eight Republican associate justices agreed that evidence in the case did not support a finding of fraud. Democratic Chief Justice Sue Bell Cobb dissented. She maintains that corporate greed should not outweigh the interests of the people of Alabama.

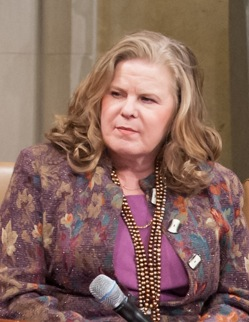
Cobb speaking at a DOJ panel

=== Accomplishments ===
==== Juvenile justice reform ====
Cobb was a critical champion and contributor to the passage of the 2008 Juvenile Justice Reform Act of 2008. Following passage of the bill, Juvenile crime decreased and number of imprisoned children was reduced by more than 60%.

=== Retirement ===
Cobb announced her intention to retire from office on June 30, 2011, to devote more time to her family. Cobb noted that she had also been wary of "the cost of running for office while maintaining judicial objectivity". She denied that her decision to step down was connected with a potential bid for Governor of Alabama in the 2014 election, She considered it, but ultimately decided against running. After stepping down, she became "a national advocate for changing how judges are selected", saying on her race against Nabers (said to be the second most expensive judicial race in American history), "Everything we did was legal and ethical, but that didn't mean it was right". In 2015, in an op-ed piece for Politico, she said she was ashamed of the amount of money she had to raise to win the election.

== Candidate for Governor ==
On June 14, 2017, Cobb announced her candidacy for governor, declaring "I simply cannot stand by and watch as one more community hospital closes its doors. I cannot be still as so many bad decisions that affect us all continue to be made. As the head of Alabama’s judicial branch, and in the face of significant obstacles, I was able to work with amazing court leaders and state employees to make vast improvements in the lives of others. If given the opportunity, I would be honored to put my experience and skill set to work in the executive branch. I promise, I will work and I will not stop until there is light again on Alabama’s horizon."

== Post-Political Work ==
In 2021 Cobb along with Judge Teresa Pulliam established Redemption Earned to help those in the Alabama Department of Corrections serving life who are aging, chronically ill, or rehabilitated gain parole.

== Personal life ==
Cobb is married to William J. Cobb, Executive Director of Governmental Affairs of Bell South (retired). They have three children and four grandchildren.

== Honors ==
Cobb was inducted into the University of Alabama School of Law's Alabama Lawyer Hall of Honor in 2023.

== See also ==
- List of female state supreme court justices

Legal offices
Preceded by Drayton Nabers	Chief Justice of the Alabama Supreme Court; 2007–2011	Succeeded by Chuck Malone
