= Henry Y. Webb =

American judge (1784–1823)

Henry Young Webb (August 4, 1784 – September 20, 1823) was an American jurist who served as a justice of the Supreme Court of Alabama from 1820 to 1823.

Webb was born in Granville County, North Carolina. He graduated from the University of North Carolina in 1807.

Webb served in North Carolina's legislature before being appointed an Alabama territorial judge in 1818. He was "one of five men who gathered in Cahaba in 1820 to organize the supreme court of Alabama and hold its first term".

Political offices
Preceded by Newly established seat	Justice of the Supreme Court of Alabama; 1820–1823	Succeeded by Henry Minor
