= J. Gorman Houston Jr. =

American judge (1933–2024)

James Gorman Houston Jr. (March 11, 1933 – September 13, 2024) was an American judge who was a justice of the Supreme Court of Alabama from 1985 to 2005. He served as Acting Chief Justice after judge Roy Moore was removed from office in 2003, and served in that capacity until the election of Drayton Nabers Jr. in 2004.

== Life and career ==
Born in Eufaula, Alabama, to Gorman and Mildred Vance Houston, he attended the public schools of Eufaula.

He received a B.S. from Auburn University, followed by a J.D. from the University of Alabama School of Law, afterwards serving as a law clerk for Chief Justice J. Ed Livingston, and a judge advocate in the United States Air Force.

In 1985, Governor George Wallace appointed Houston to a seat on the state supreme court vacated by the retirement of Justice T. Eric Embry, effective September 16, 1985. In 1986, Houston was elected to a full term, and subsequently reelected. On November 13, 2003, Chief Justice Moore was removed from office due to ethics violations, making Houston, as senior associate justice, the acting chief justice until January 22, 2004, when Drayton Nabers Jr. was appointed Chief Justice. Houston declined to run for reelection in 2004. In 2018, Houston endorsed Bob Vance for the office of chief justice.

Houston died on September 13, 2024, at the age of 91.

Political offices
Preceded by T. Eric Embry	Justice of the Supreme Court of Alabama; 1985–2005	Succeeded by Patricia M. Smith
