= John C. Anderson (judge) =

American judge (1863–1940)

Chief Justice of the Supreme Court of Alabama
- In office 1914–1940

Associate Justice of the Supreme Court of Alabama
- In office 1904–1914

Personal details
- Born: John Crawford Anderson; August 5, 1863 Greene County, Alabama, US
- Died: April 27, 1940 (aged 76) Montgomery, Alabama, US
- Spouses: Mary Bird Martin (m. 1897, died) Glen David (m. 1927)
- Children: 3
- Education: University of Alabama School of Law

John Crawford Anderson (August 5, 1863 – April 27, 1940) was an associate justice of the Supreme Court of Alabama from 1904 to 1914, and then Chief Justice from 1914 until his death in 1940.

== Biography ==
Born in Greene County, Alabama, Anderson received a law degree from the University of Alabama School of Law in 1883, and established a successful law practice in Marengo County, Alabama. He was initially appointed to a circuit court position by Governor William C. Oates in 1895. He was elected to a newly created seat on the Alabama Supreme Court in 1904, and was elevated to Chief Justice in 1914 (succeeding James R. Dowdell). He served in that position until his death in 1940.

While Chief Justice, Anderson was the only member of the Alabama Supreme Court to dissent in the Scottsboro Boys cases, a high-profile event where nine young Black men were accused and rapidly convicted of raping two White women. Anderson argued that the "overheated" nature of the proceedings and the failure to provide adequate counsel necessitated new trials for the defendants. His position was later vindicated by the U.S. Supreme Court in Powell v. Alabama.

== Personal life ==
He married Mary Bird Martin in Tuscaloosa on February 24, 1897, and they had two daughters. After her death, he remarried to Glen David in 1927, and they had one daughter.

Anderson died from a heart attack in Montgomery on April 27, 1940.

Political offices
Preceded by James R. Dowdell	Chief Justice of the Supreme Court of Alabama; 1914–1940	Succeeded by Lucien D. Gardner
