= Sion L. Perry =

American judge (c. 1793–1874)

Sion Luther Perry (c. 1793 – August 1874) was a justice of the Supreme Court of Alabama from 1828 to 1832.

Perry was appointed to the court from Tuscaloosa, Alabama.

He fought at the Battle of Emuckfaw, in what would later become Tallapoosa County, Alabama, near the end of the War of 1812, and settled in Madison in 1815, and Tuscaloosa three years later. Perry was reported to have been "the first attorney that located within the corporate limits of Tuscaloosa city".

He served as a member of the Alabama House of Representatives in 1821, and was a circuit judge from 1828 to 1833, having been elected to a newly established seventh circuit in 1828, which automatically placed him on the state supreme court. He served on the court from January 9, 1828 to January 14, 1832, and was thereafter a circuit court judge until 1834.

Perry died in Tuskaloosa at the age of 82.

Political offices
Preceded by Newly created seat.	Justice of the Supreme Court of Alabama; 1828–1832	Succeeded by Joshua L. Martin
