= David G. Ligon =

American judge (1804–1844)

David Greenhill Ligon (April 6, 1804 – January 21, 1855) was an American jurist who served as a justice of the Supreme Court of Alabama from 1851 to 1854.

== Early life and career ==
Born in Prince Edward County, Virginia, Ligon's father was William Ligon (born 1765) who was married to a Miss Leigh, of a prominent family. Ligon "had been thoroughly educated, and was master of the English language". He moved to Courtland, Alabama from Virginia in 1823. He and Rev. John L. Townes were the sons of two sisters of the Leigh family; and this gave him immediate entry into high society. He moved to Mississippi for a time, where he entered politics in 1828 as a candidate for the State House of Representatives. He lost, but was elected in 1829.

He fell on hard times, moved to Moulton, then returned to Courtland, and then to Decatur where he ran a newspaper. He returned to Moulton and supported the presidential campaign of William Henry Harrison. He was a Whig.

In 1842 he became a member of the Christian Church (Cambellite) and a few years later began preaching. He also practiced law for several years in partnership with Judge Thomas Minott Peters.

== Judicial career ==
In 1845, Ligon was elected to his first judicial position, as Chancellor of the Northern Division of Alabama. In 1848 he published a book titled Digested Index of the Supreme Court of Alabama, Chancery Cases, from 1820 to 1847. It was found useful to the profession, and a second edition was published. Ligon was a candidate for Congress in opposition to David Hubbard in 1849. Ligon lost, but in 1851, when the Alabama Supreme Court was expanded from three seats to five, Ligon was elected Associate Judge of the Supreme Court alongside John D. Phelan, a Democrat. After a further reorganization of the court in 1853, he declined re-election.

In 1854 he was elected trustee of the State University. He died the following year, while preaching in the Christian Church at Moulton, from apoplexy.

== Personal life ==
Ligon was described as being about six feet tall with dark hair and deep blue eyes. He married Elizabeth Greenhill Rice, his cousin, in 1824. She died on August 12, 1868. Ligon had five children:

- Dr. Charles W. Ligon, born in Courtland in 1825 and married to Susan Follis in 1857.
- Pascal L. Ligon, a lawyer born in Moulton in 1828 and married to Martha P. Lee around 1853. He became an Arkansas state senator for Powhatan County before his death in 1867.
- David G. Ligon, Jr., born in Courtland in 1832 who died while serving in the army, during the American Civil War, near Shannon, in 1862.
- John H. Ligon born December, 1835 who lived near Moulton.
- Sarah C. Ligon, born in Moulton in 1840, married to E. C. McDonald a son of the late Crockett McDonald, Esq.

Political offices
Preceded by Newly created seat	Justice of the Supreme Court of Alabama; 1851–1853	Succeeded by Seat abolished
