= Patricia M. Smith =

American judge

Patricia Mungenast Smith (born c. 1953) is a former associate justice of the Supreme Court of Alabama.

Smith, born around 1953 to Andy and Norma Mungenast, was raised in a military household. She received her higher education from Troy University (1973) and Jones Law School (1976). After practicing at a law firm, Smith became the first female to serve as the Assistant District Attorney for the 18th Judicial Circuit. In 1980, she achieved another historical milestone by becoming the first female to serve as a Judge of the Shelby County Family Court. By 2004, Smith was elected as a justice of the Supreme Court of Alabama. She remained on the bench until her retirement in 2011.

== See also ==
- Supreme Court of Alabama
- List of justices of the Supreme Court of Alabama
- List of first women lawyers and judges in Alabama

Political offices
Preceded by J. Gorman Houston Jr.	Justice of the Supreme Court of Alabama; 2004-2011	Succeeded by Kelli Wise
