= Mayfield School =

Mayfield School may refer to these schools:

in Canada:

- Mayfield Secondary School, Caledon, Ontario

in England:

- Mayfield School, East Sussex, Mayfield
- Mayfield School, Portsmouth, Hampshire
- Mayfield School, Ilford, London
- Mayfield Grammar School, Gravesend, Kent

in the United States:

- Mayfield High School (Ohio), Mayfield, Ohio
- Mayfield High School (Kentucky), Mayfield, Kentucky
- Mayfield High School (New Mexico), Las Cruces, New Mexico
- Mayfield Senior School, Pasadena, California
