= Joel B. Brown =

American judge (1872–1953)

Joel Bascom Brown (May 18, 1872 – April 13, 1953) was a justice of the Supreme Court of Alabama from 1919 to 1921, and again from 1927 to 1953.

== Biography ==
Born near Somerville, Alabama, Brown "attended the common schools" of his county, and graduated from Hartselle College in 1889. He read law to gain admission to the bar in Cullman County in 1892.

In 1914, he ran for a seat on the state court of appeals, to which he was elected, being sworn into office in November of that year. He served as the presiding judge of the court from 1917 until he was appointed by Governor Thomas Kilby to succeed Justice J. J. Mayfield on the state supreme court on November 1, 1919.

In 1920, Benjamin M. Miller defeated Brown in the Democratic primary to complete the unexpired term. In 1926, Brown defeated Miller in a race for a complete term on the court.

Brown's second stint on the court lasted for 26 years, until his death on April 12, 1953. Brown was then succeeded on the court by the appointment of Preston C. Clayton.

== Personal life and death ==
In 1898, Brown married Minnie Heidelberg of Cullman, who had come there from her home state of California. She died in 1939, and in 1941, he married Rebecca Knight Odum, daughter of Associate Justice Thomas E. Knight Jr.

Brown died at the age of 81 in a hospital in Montgomery, where he had been taken following a heart attack.

Political offices
Preceded by J. J. Mayfield; Benjamin M. Miller	Justice of the Supreme Court of Alabama; 1919–1921; 1927–1953	Succeeded by Benjamin M. Miller; Preston C. Clayton
