= James J. Mayfield =

American judge (1911–1956)

James Jefferson Mayfield Jr. (November 10, 1911 – April 4, 1956) was an American judge. He servered as a justice of the Supreme Court of Alabama from 1954 until his death in 1956.

== Early life, education and military service ==
Born on November 10, 1911, in Tuscaloosa, Alabama, Mayfield's father, J. J. Mayfield, was an Alabama legal scholar who also served on the state supreme court. Mayfield received a B.A. from the University of Alabama in 1932, and a law degree from the same institution in 1934, after which he became a United States conciliation commissioner that same year, and an assistant attorney general in 1935. In 1936, he chaired the Board of Registrars. During World War II, Mayfield joined the Army Air Forces and graduated from the Judge Advocate School at the University of Michigan, thereafter deploying to "a combat bombardment group in the Southwest Pacific".

== Legal and judicial career ==
After the war, Mayfield "returned to Tuscaloosa to practice law and built a reputation as an experienced and able lawyer", also lecturing at the University of Alabama School of Law from 1946 to 1953.

In November 1954, Mayfield was elected to a seat on the state supreme court to succeed interim appointee Preston C. Clayton in the seat vacated by the death of Justice Joel B. Brown. Mayfield took office on November 12, 1954, and served until his death by suicide on April 4, 1956. A week before his death, Mayfield had made a speech in support of racial segregation in the United States, declaring that he would not "stand by and see the Supreme Court abolish our Southern way of life".

== Personal life and death ==
In 1934, Mayfield married Elizabeth Montgomery Mason, with whom he had one son before their divorce. In 1951, Mayfield married Janette Smith Gibson, with whom he also had one son. Mayfield died on April 4, 1956, from a gunshot wound to the head, which the coroner ruled to be a suicide. He left no note to explain his actions, but Mayfield's maid, who found the body, reported that Mayfield "had been despondent over his bid for renomination to the court", in part due to the controversy over his position on segregation.

Political offices
Preceded by Preston C. Clayton	Justice of the Supreme Court of Alabama; 1954–1956	Succeeded by Norman T. Spann
