= A. A. Evans =

American judge

- Born: December 24, 1862; Clayton, Alabama
- Died: November 9, 1935 (aged 72)

Aurelius Augustus Evans (December 24, 1862 – November 9, 1935) was a justice of the Supreme Court of Alabama from 1909 to 1911.

== Biography ==
Evans was born in Clayton, Alabama and was the son of John Quincy and France Elizabeth (Collier) Evans, and the grandson of John Evans and of Vines and Sarah Collier. The Collier family came to Upson County, Georgia from Virginia. Evans graduated from the University of Alabama School of Law in 1885 and was a member of Phi Delta Alpha.

Evans was at one time a judge of the circuit court serving in Lee County. For a few years, he taught school while reading law. In December, 1888, Evans married Celestia Victoria Waddell. They had three children. In 1889, he was admitted to the bar and Clayton for nine years, until he was elected circuit judge in 1898, he served on the circuit court for eleven years. In 1909, he accepted an appointment by Governor B. B. Comer to the Supreme Court to fill the vacancy created by the resignation of N. D. Denson. Evans chose not to run for election the following year. Following his term on the court, Evans served for eight years on the State Tax Commission and also as special assistant attorney general.

In September 1909, N. D. Denson resigned, and Evans was appointed to succeed him. On January 16, 1911, Evans retired and was replaced by Ormond Somerville. Evans died in Montgomery, Alabama.
