= John R. Tyson =

American lawyer, politician and judge (1856–1923)

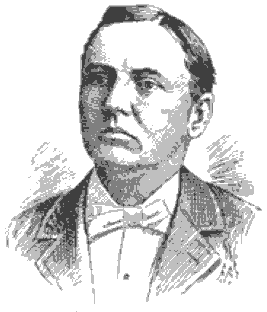

Member of the U.S. House of Representatives from Alabama's 2nd district
- In office March 4, 1921 – March 27, 1923
- Preceded by: S. Hubert Dent, Jr.
- Succeeded by: J. Lister Hill

18th Chief Justice of the Supreme Court of Alabama
- In office 1906–1909
- Preceded by: Samuel D. Weakley Jr.
- Succeeded by: James R. Dowdell

Associate Justice of the Alabama Supreme Court
- In office 1898–1906

Alabama Circuit Court Judge
- In office 1892–1898

Member of the Alabama House of Representatives
- In office 1880

Personal details
- Born: John Russell Tyson; November 28, 1856 Lowndes County, Alabama, U.S.
- Died: March 27, 1923 (aged 66) Rochester, Minnesota, U.S.
- Resting place: Oakwood Cemetery
- Party: Democratic
- Spouse: Mary Dossie Jordan (m. 1862)
- Children: 3
- Education: Howard College; Washington and Lee University
- Occupation: Lawyer; judge; politician
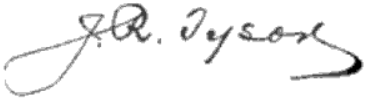
- Signature

John Russell Tyson (November 28, 1856 – March 27, 1923) was an American lawyer, politician and judge. He served in the Alabama legislature before becoming a circuit judge, and later serving on the Alabama Supreme Court as associate justice and chief justice, before resigning to resume his legal practice. Elected as U.S. Representative for Alabama's 2nd congressional district in 1920, he won re-election in 1922, but died less than a month after being sworn in to the 67th U.S. Congress.

== Early life ==
Through an entirely paternal line, Tyson was a direct descendant of famed English scientist Edward Tyson. John R. Tyson graduated from Howard College, Marion, Alabama, in 1877 and from Washington and Lee University, Lexington, Virginia, in 1879.

== Career ==
Admitted to the Alabama bar in 1879, Tyson began his legal career in Hayneville, Lowndes County, Alabama.

He represented Lowndes County in the Alabama State house of representatives in 1880, and four years later moved to the state capital, Montgomery, Alabama, and established his legal practice there. Montgomery voters elected and re-elected Tyson as a member of the city council beginning in May 1889 and he became its president in May 1891. He resigned that position in October 1892, after accepting an appointment to the circuit court.

=== Judicial career ===
Tyson served as a circuit court judge from 1892 to 1898. He then served as associate justice of the Alabama Supreme Court from 1898 to 1906, then became its chief justice from November 1906 to February 28, 1909, when he resigned and resumed the practice of law in Montgomery, Alabama.

=== U.S. House of Representatives ===
Tyson was elected as a Democrat to the Sixty-seventh and Sixty-eighth Congresses, and served from March 4, 1921, until his death in Rochester, Minnesota, on March 27, 1923.

== Personal life ==
He married Mary Dossie Jordan, daughter of Dr. James R. Jordan who died in Lexington, Virginia in 1862. Their children included Patsy J. Tyson (1881–1972), Ellen Tyson Noble (1887–1977) and James Jordan Tyson (1893–1966).

== Death and legacy ==
He died in Rochester, Minnesota, in hospital, and was buried in Oakwood Cemetery. His grandson, John M. Tyson Sr. continued the family's legal and political traditions, serving as a municipal judge and in both houses of the Alabama legislature representing Mobile, although he lost his race to represent Alabama's 1st congressional district in 1964. His great-grandson John M. Tyson Sr. served as the Mobile County District Attorney, but lost his bids for statewide elective office.

== See also ==
- List of members of the United States Congress who died in office (1900–1949)

Legal offices
| Preceded by Samuel D. Weakley | Chief Justice of the Supreme Court of Alabama; 1906–1909 | Succeeded by James R. Dowdell |
U.S. House of Representatives
| Preceded by S. Hubert Dent Jr. | Member of the U.S. House of Representatives from Alabama's 2nd congressional district March 4, 1921 – March 27, 1923 | Succeeded by J. Lister Hill |
