= Mayfield (Middletown, Delaware) =

Historic house in Delaware, US

- U.S. National Register of Historic Places
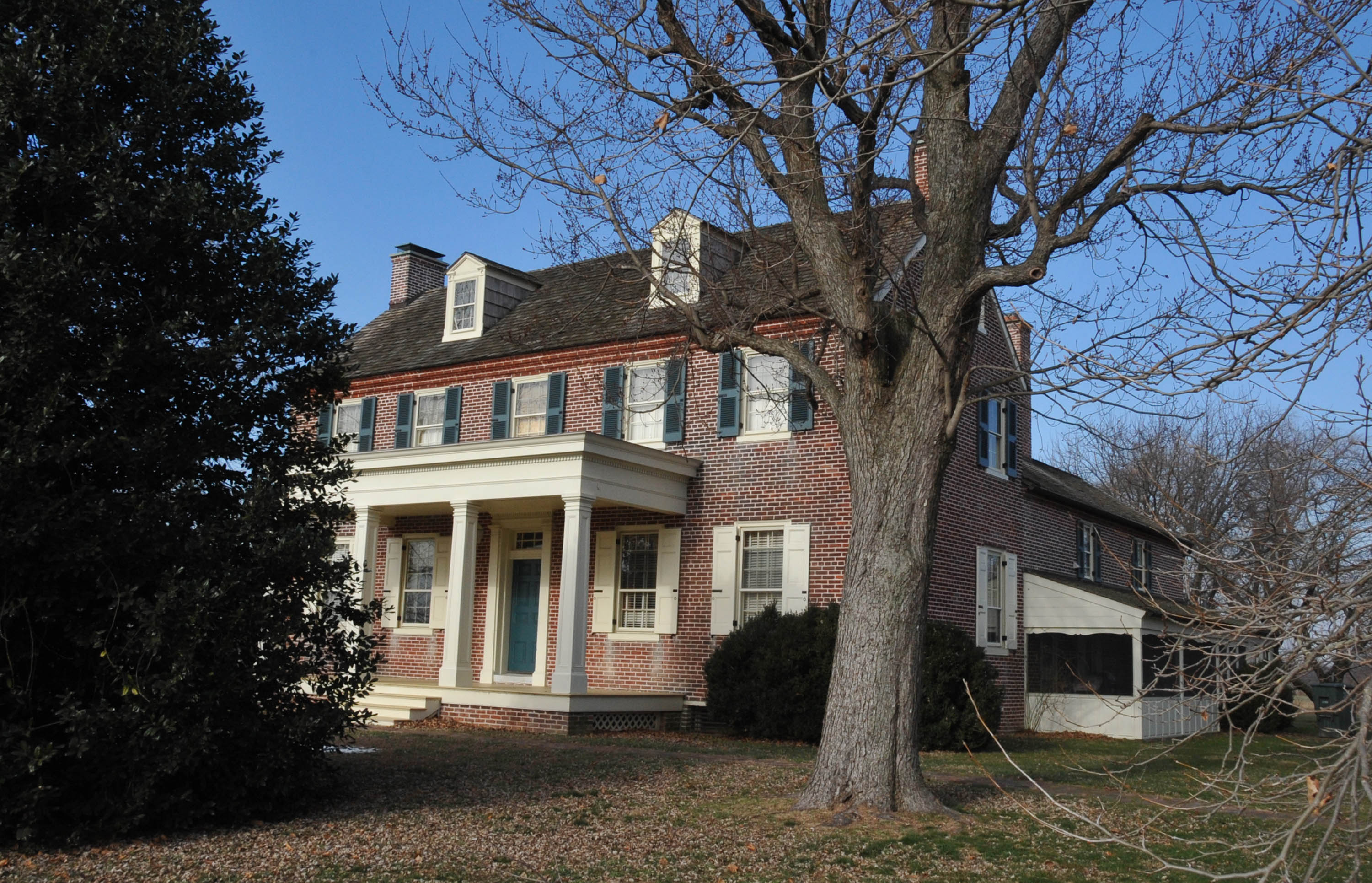

- Location within Delaware Location within the United States
- Location: 1603 Levels Rd. in Appoquinimink Hundred, near Middletown, Delaware
- Coordinates: 39°24′1″N 75°45′21″W
- Area: 5.2 acres (2.1 ha)
- Built: c. 1839
- Architectural style: Vernacular Greek Revival
- NRHP reference No.: 97000836
- Added to NRHP: August 1, 1997

Mayfield, also known as the William Wilson House, is a historic home located near Middletown in New Castle County, Delaware, United States. It was built about 1839, and is a 2 1/2-story, five-bay, center hall plan brick dwelling with a two-story, rear service wing. The house is in a vernacular Greek Revival style. It measures approximately 45 feet wide and 25 feet deep. It features a steeply pitched gable roof with dormers and tetrastyle, Greek Revival-style porch on brick footings.

It was listed on the National Register of Historic Places in 1997.
