= Robert B. Harwood =

American judge (1902–1941)

Robert Bernard Harwood (June 4, 1902 – October 29, 1991) was a justice of the Supreme Court of Alabama from 1962 to 1975.

== Early life and political career ==
Harwood "earned his undergraduate and law degrees from the University of Alabama", gaining admission to the bar in Alabama in 1926. He entered the practice of law in Tuscaloosa in 1927, and "later attended Harvard Law School and was awarded his LL.M. in 1932".

Harwood served in the Alabama Legislature from 1927 to 1931, and as an Assistant United States Attorney from 1933 to 1935. He taught at the University of Alabama School of Law from 1935 to 1942, also serving as an assistant dean after 1937.

== Judicial service ==
In October 1945, Governor Chauncey Sparks named Harwood to a seat on the Court of Appeals vacated by the death of Judge James Rice.

On May 16, 1962, Governor John M. Patterson appointed Harwood to a seat on the court vacated by the resignation of Justice Davis F. Stakely.

Harwood was elected to the Supreme Court of Alabama as a Democrat in 1962, and twice re-elected, running unopposed in 1968. Harwood did not run for reelection in 1974, retiring at the end of his term in 1975.

== Personal life ==
Harwood married Mary Lee Leach of Tuscaloosa in 1926, with whom he had two children. His son, R. Bernard Harwood Jr., also served on the state supreme court, having been elected as a Republican.

Political offices
Preceded by Davis F. Stakely	Justice of the Supreme Court of Alabama; 1962–1975	Succeeded by T. Eric Embry
