= Mayfield Park =

Mayfield Park may refer to

- Mayfield Park, Bristol, a suburb of Bristol, England
- Mayfield Park, a suburb of Bournemouth, England
- Mayfield Park, Edinburgh, a former recreational area in Newington, Scotland (see Hibernian F.C.)
- Mayfield Park, Gauteng, a suburb of Johannesburg, South Africa
- Mayfield Park, Manchester, a public park in Manchester city centre, England
- Mayfield Park, Southampton, a recreational area in the suburb of Woolston, Southampton, England
- Mayfield Park (Austin, Texas), a historic natural area in west Austin.
