= John H. England =

American judge (born 1947)

John H. England Jr. (born June 5, 1947) is an American lawyer who served as a justice of the Supreme Court of Alabama from 1999 to 2001.

== Biography ==
John H. England was born in Uniontown, Alabama. He attended public schools in Birmingham and received his B.S. in chemistry from Tuskegee Institute in 1969 and a Juris Doctor degree from the University of Alabama School of Law in 1974. He served in the U.S. Army as a Military Policeman for two years.

In 1974, England began practicing law in Tuscaloosa. He was elected to the Tuscaloosa City Council in 1985.

In 1993, England was appointed to the Tuscaloosa County Circuit Court, and in 1999, to the Alabama Supreme Court, where he served until 2001, having been defeated by challenger Thomas A. Woodall in his 2000 bid for reelection to the court. He held multiple tenures on the Circuit Court until his retirement in 2021.

His son, Christopher J. England (born 1976), serves in the Alabama House of Representatives and is a former chair of the Alabama Democratic Party.

Political offices
Preceded by Mark Kennedy	Justice of the Supreme Court of Alabama; 1999–2001	Succeeded by Thomas A. Woodall
