= James B. Head =

American judge (1846–1902)

James Butler Head (December 16, 1846 – June 26, 1902) was an American jurist who served as a justice of the Supreme Court of Alabama from 1892 to 1898.

Born in Clinton, Greene County, Alabama, Head served in the Union Army during the American Civil War, in Company A, Sixteenth Alabama cavalry.

After the war he served for a time as Deputy in the office of the Circuit Clerk in Eutaw, Alabama while he read law to gain admission to the Alabama State Bar. While copying lengthy pleadings, he "made mental notes as to how they could have been simplified and shortened", and employed those in practice. He married Virginia Pearce, a daughter of Judge William F. Pearce, of Eutaw.

Head practiced law in Eutaw until 1888, when he moved to Birmingham. There, Head was appointed Judge of the Ninth Judicial Circuit. In 1892 he was elected to the Supreme Court of Alabama, and moved to Montgomery. He did not run for reelection in 1898, as he had begun to suffer from blindness in his older years, an experience which was personally devastating for him.

Political offices
Preceded by W. S. Thorington	Justice of the Supreme Court of Alabama; 1892–1898	Succeeded by John R. Tyson
