= Mayfield Township =

Mayfield Township may refer to:

- Mayfield Township, DeKalb County, Illinois
- Mayfield Township, Grand Traverse County, Michigan
- Mayfield Township, Lapeer County, Michigan
- Mayfield Township, Pennington County, Minnesota
- Mayfield Township, Hall County, Nebraska
- Mayfield Township, Cuyahoga County, Ohio
- Mayfield Township, Yankton County, South Dakota in Yankton County, South Dakota
