= Samuel D. Weakley =

American judge (1860–1921)

Samuel Davies Weakley Jr. (July 16, 1860 – February 14, 1921) was American jurist who served as chief justice of the Supreme Court of Alabama in 1906.

Born in Morgan County, Alabama, Weakley attended a prep school in Florence, Alabama, graduating from Florence State Normal School in 1879. He taught school in Lauderdale County, Alabama for a few months while reading law, in order to be admitted to the Alabama Bar in 1880. He then relocated to Memphis, Tennessee and entered legal practice, serving a four-year term as assistant attorney general for Shelby County. He returned to Alabama in 1887, practicing law in Birmingham.

Following the death of Alabama Chief Justice Thomas N. McClellan, Governor William D. Jelks appointed Weakley as his successor in February 1906. That fall, Associate Justice John R. Tyson challenged Weakley for his position, winning the election, leading Weakley to retire in November 1906.

Legal offices
Preceded by Thomas N. McClellan	Chief Justice of the Supreme Court of Alabama; 1906	Succeeded by John R. Tyson
