= Thomas N. McClellan =

American judge (1853–1906)

Thomas N. McClellan (February 23, 1853 – February 10, 1906) was an associate justice of the Supreme Court of Alabama from 1889 to 1898, and chief justice from 1898 to 1906.

He served in the Alabama Senate from 1880 to 1884 and as Attorney General of Alabama from 1882 to 1889. In 1889, a fourth seat was added to the state supreme court, to which McClellan was appointed.

He died during a train journey with his nephew Thomas C. McClellan, at the age of 52. His home was in Athens, Alabama. Thomas C. McClellen was elected to the supreme court later that same year.

McClellan's father was state legislator Thomas J. McClellan, a Whig who served in the Alabama House of Representatives in 1862.

Political offices
| Preceded by Newly created seat | Justice of the Supreme Court of Alabama; 1889–1898 | Succeeded by Court substantially reconfigured |
| Preceded by Robert C. Brickell | Chief Justice of the Supreme Court of Alabama; 1898–1906 | Succeeded by Samuel D. Weakley |
