= Drayton Nabers Jr. =

American judge (born 1940)

Drayton Nabers

24th Chief Justice of the Alabama Supreme Court
- In office June 15, 2004 – January 17, 2007
- Appointed by: Bob Riley
- Preceded by: Gorman Houston (acting)
- Succeeded by: Sue Bell Cobb

Personal details
- Born: December 2, 1940 (age 85) Birmingham, Alabama, U.S.
- Party: Republican
- Spouse: Fairfax Smathers
- Education: Princeton University (BA); Yale University (JD)
- Website: Official website

Drayton Nabers Jr. (born December 2, 1940) is an American lawyer and former chief justice of the Alabama Supreme Court. He was appointed to the court in 2003 by Governor Bob Riley following Chief Justice Roy Moore's removal as a result of his refusal to remove his Ten Commandments Monument from the State Judicial Building despite a federal court order to do so, an event that attracted national media attention.

== Early life and education ==
Nabers was born in Birmingham, Alabama on December 2, 1940 to Drayton Nabers and June Porter Nabers. He received his B.A. from Princeton University in 1962 and his LL.B from Yale Law School in 1965.

== Career ==
After graduating from law school, Nabers served as law clerk to Justice Hugo Black of the U.S. Supreme Court. He joined the Birmingham, Alabama law firm of Cabaniss, Johnston, Gardner, Dumas & O'Neal in 1967 and became a partner in 1971. In 1979, following 12 years at the firm, he joined Protective Life Corporation. as general counsel. He became the company's chief executive officer in 1992, and chairman of the board in 1994. According to the Encyclopedia of Alabama, "Nabers continued Protective Life's growth with significant acquisitions, while at the same time promoting internal growth and the expansion of specialty insurance lines." He retired as president, CEO, and chairman of the company in 2002. Alabama Governor Bob Riley, a close associate of Naber, appointed Drayton to the post of state finance director. Nabers also was an adjunct instructor at the Beeson Divinity School of Samford University, teaching a course on Christian ethics.

On June 22, 2004, Riley appointed Nabers to fill the unexpired term of Roy Moore as chief justice of Alabama. Moore was removed for office after refusing to obey a federal court order requiring him to remove a stone monument to the Ten Commandments that he had installed in the rotunda of the Alabama Judicial Building. Nabers ran for election in 2006 in the Republican primary for chief justice. He defeated Justice Tom Parker, a Moore ally, by nearly 20 percentage points in the Republican primary, but in the general election lost to Sue Bell Cobb, the lone Democrat on the Alabama Court of Criminal Appeals, by three percentage points. The Alabama chief justice race was the most expensive judicial campaign in the United States in 2006. Nabers served slightly over two and a half years in office.

Following his loss, Nabers returned to practicing law at Maynard, Cooper & Gale, P.C., where he is of counsel in the Birmingham office. In early 2009, Alabama Governor Riley appointed Nabers to oversee the distribution to state-controlled agencies of federal stimulus funds. The $200,000 contract came to an end in 2010. Nabers became the director of the Frances Marlin Mann Center for Ethics and Leadership at Samford University in January 2014. A position in which he served through 2018.

Nabers has spoken publicly in support of a new trial for Alabama death row prisoner Toforest Johnson. In April 2022, Nabers published an op-ed in the Alabama Daily News, which asked, "Why Is Toforest Johnson Still on Alabama’s Death Row?" He also joined an amicus brief filed on behalf of former Alabama justices and judges in support of a new trial for Johnson.

== Awards and honors ==
Nabers received the Yale Law School Award of Merit in 2006.

== Personal life ==
Nabers is married to Fairfax Smathers Nabers; they have three children. He is a member of St. Luke's Episcopal Church.

== See also ==
- List of law clerks for the first seat of the Supreme Court of the United States

Legal offices
Preceded by Gorman Houston; Acting	Chief Justice of the Alabama Supreme Court; 2004–2007	Succeeded by Sue Bell Cobb
