= Thomas Minott Peters =

American judge

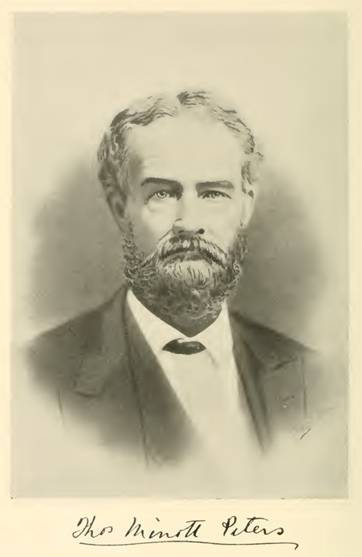
- Thomas Minott Peters, circa 1870
- Born: December 4, 1810; Clarksville, Tennessee
- Died: June 14, 1888 (aged 77); Moulton, Alabama
- Scientific career
- Fields: Law; Botany

Thomas Minott Peters (December 4, 1810 – June 14, 1888) was an American lawyer, jurist, and botanist who studied the flora of the Southern United States.

== Early life and education ==
Born in Clarksville, the county seat of Tennessee's Montgomery County, Peters was eight when his family moved to Leighton, now in Colbert County, Alabama in 1819. He briefly attended LaGrange College (located on the top of the LaGrange Mountain in Leighton, Alabama, which is now a famous historical site) and graduated from the University of Alabama with a bachelor's degree in 1834 and a master's degree in 1836.

== Career ==
Peters was admitted to practice law in 1836. He practiced for several years in partnership with David G. Ligon. He served in the Alabama House of Representatives (1845–1846) and the Alabama Senate (1847–1848). He was elected to represent Lawrence County, Alabama as by that time he had moved to Moulton, Alabama. Even though he owned slaves prior to the American Civil War, he was a steadfast Unionist and left Alabama during the war. Peters considered the Confederates traitors and even wanted to hang Jefferson Davis and "all his traitorous set". Despite this, Peters, a Republican, was elected to the Alabama Supreme Court in 1868 and became the Chief Justice in 1873. He was defeated for reelection in 1874, likely because he supported equal rights for women and African Americans. He returned to his law practice in Moulton and worked there until his death.

=== Botanist ===
German-American botanist Charles Mohr praised Peters' botany work, writing in the book Plant Life of Alabama: "In his love for botany [Thomas Minott Peters] found recreation from his professional duties, and his greatest enjoyment was to wander through the adjacent mountains in search of plants. The study of lichens and fungi attracted him particularly, and he was one of the few mycologists working in the Southern field along with Curtis and Ravenel." The rare fern Trichomanes petersii (A.Gray 1853) was discovered by and is the namesake of Peters. He also did notable work with the genus Carex. He left his personal herbarium to the University of Alabama.

== Personal life and death ==
Peters married Naomi Sophia Leetch (20 September 1820 – 18 June 1880), who was from Moulton. They had six children. Peters died June 14, 1888, in Moulton and is buried in Moulton Cemetery, as are his family.

== Honors ==
Peters was inducted into the Alabama Lawyers' Hall of Fame in 2006.
