= Mayfield, South Africa =

Mayfield
- Location within KwaZulu-Natal Location within South Africa
- Coordinates: 30.261°S 30.505°E
- Country: South Africa
- Province: KwaZulu-Natal
- District: Ugu
- Municipality: Umdoni

Area
  - Total: 0.88 km^{2} (0.34 sq mi)

Population (2011)
  - Total: 1,003
  - Density: 1,100/km^{2} (3,000/sq mi)

Racial makeup (2011)
  - Black African: 99.3%
  - Indian/Asian: 0.2%
  - Other: 0.5%

First languages (2011)
  - Zulu: 95.2%
  - S. Ndebele: 2.0%
  - English: 1.1%
  - Other: 1.7%
- Time zone: UTC+2 (SAST)

Mayfield is an area south of Braemar in Umzinto, South Africa, surrounded by Mbungulu, Braemar, and Mkhunya/Dumisa. It is located under Ugu District Municipality at an offramp, D307 in Sawoti, opposite Sawoti Police Station, that road goes to Mbungulu and Ncazuka.

The area includes Himmelberg Intermediate School in Mayfield. The D307 road also provides access to Phungula Primary School in kwaMbungulu.
