= Arthur B. Foster =

American judge (1872–1958)

Arthur B. Foster (October 18, 1872 – July 17, 1958) was a justice of the Supreme Court of Alabama from 1928 to 1953.

== Biography ==
Born in Clayton, Barbour County, Alabama, he received his B.A. in 1890 and a law degree from University of Alabama School of Law in 1891. Later that year, he was admitted to the bar.

Foster was a secretary of the board of trustees of the University of Alabama.

From 1892 to 1897, he was register in chancery and, in 1903, he represented Pike County in the state legislature.

He was member of Alabama state House of Representatives. In 1903, he was chosen to be a circuit judge for the 12th district. On September 10, 1928, Governor Bibb Graves appointed him to be an Alabama Supreme Court justice in order to fill the vacancy occasioned by the death of Ormond Somerville. Foster was elected to a full term in 1930 and re-elected to successive terms until his retirement in 1953.
