= J. J. Mayfield =

American judge, politician and educator (1861–1927)

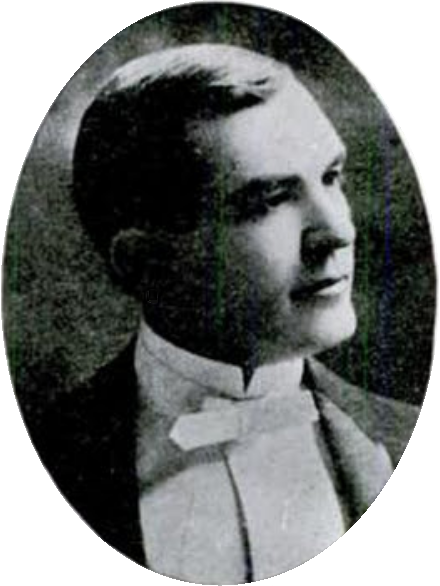
- Mayfield in 1904

Justice of the Alabama Supreme Court
- In office 1909–1919
- Preceded by: Newly reconstituted court
- Succeeded by: Joel B. Brown

Personal details
- Born: James Jefferson Mayfield; March 22, 1861 Moores Bridge, Alabama, U.S.
- Died: January 1, 1927 (aged 65) Montgomery, Alabama, U.S.
- Children: James J. Mayfield
- Education: University of Alabama
- Occupation: Judge, politician, educator

James Jefferson Mayfield Sr. (March 22, 1861 – January 1, 1927) was an American judge, politician and educator, who served as a justice of the Supreme Court of Alabama from 1909 to 1919.

== Early life ==
Mayfield was born on March 22, 1861, in Moores Bridge, Alabama, to James Jefferson Mayfield and Amanda C. Mayfield (née South). He attended the University of Alabama from September 18, 1883, to June 1888, with a degree in law. He worked as a teacher until 1887, when he was elected tutor of physics and astronomy at the University of Alabama.

== Career ==
Mayfield served in Alabama Legislature in 1894 and 1895. He then served as judge of Tuscaloosa County from 1896 to October 1, 1903, when he was elected office of code commissioner by the Alabama Legislature. While serving, he was appointed on a committee to draft a bill providing for the codification and compilation of the Code of 1896, and assisted code commissioner W. L. Martin in the perfection of the Code of 1896, and also prepared the Code of 1906.

In 1908, Mayfield was elected as an associate justice to the state supreme court, taking the oath of office on January 18, 1909. He resigned in 1919, and was succeeded by Joel B. Brown. Mayfield was a Democratic candidate in the 1926 Alabama Senate elections, but was defeated.

== Personal life ==
On June 30, 1897, Mayfield married Susie Fitts Martin in Little Rock, Arkansas.

Mayfield died during a football game in Montgomery, Alabama, on January 1, 1927. His son James J. Mayfield later served as an Associate Justice.

Political offices
Preceded by Newly reconstituted court	Justice of the Supreme Court of Alabama; 1909–1919	Succeeded by Joel B. Brown
