= Terry L. Butts =

American judge (born 1944)

Terry Lucas Butts (born February 15, 1944) is an American lawyer, politician, and judge who served as a justice of the Supreme Court of Alabama from 1994 to 1998.

== Early life, education, and career ==
Born in Patsburg, Crenshaw County, Alabama, to Ezra Lucas Butts and Nata Watson Butts, Butts received a B.A. from Troy University, followed by a J.D. from the University of Alabama School of Law in 1968. He engaged in private practice for eight years.

== Judicial service and later life ==
He served a five-year term as a city judge in Elba, Alabama, and served as county judge for Coffee County, Alabama, before being elected as a circuit judge for Pike and Coffee counties three times, being the presiding judge of the circuit for the last several years.

In 1994, Butts ran as a Democrat for a seat on the Supreme Court of Alabama vacated by the retirement of Justice Henry B. Steagall II, winning election to the office. He was the first person from Crenshaw County to serve on the court.

Butts retired from the court in 1998, running for Attorney General of Alabama that same year, which he lost to William H. Pryor Jr.

In 2004, when Justice Roy Moore was fighting his expulsion from a seat on the state supreme court, Butts was one of the leading members of Moore's legal team. In 2017, it was speculated that Butts might run for a seat in the state senate, though this did not materialize. In 2023, the Troy University Alumni Association announced that Butts would serve as legal counsel to its board of directors.

== Personal life ==
Butts married his wife Suzanne, with whom he had two children.

Political offices
Preceded by Henry B. Steagall II	Justice of the Supreme Court of Alabama; 1994–1998	Succeeded by Champ Lyons
