= J. C. Mayfield =

American businessman (c.1856–??)

James C. Mayfield (born c. 1856) was an American businessman who bought one third of the rights to the Pemberton Medicine Company (founded by John Pemberton) in 1888. Mayfield was under the mistaken impression that he had acquired the rights to Coca-Cola, but in fact Pemberton had already sold a stake to the formula to two other individuals, Margaret Dozier and Woolfolk Walker. Moreover, Pemberton sold the rights to manufacture Coca-Cola a second time that year, to Asa Candler.

Mayfield nevertheless reincorporated the Pemberton Medicine Company in 1894, as the Wine Coca Company, and attempted to continue selling Coca-Cola (under the name of Pemberton's French Wine Coca, but with the formula modified to resemble Coke).

His ex-wife, under the pseudonym Diva Brown also attempted to sell a Coca-Cola imitation, called My-Cola. She claimed her beverage used Pemberton's original formula, although Mayfield disputed it.

In 1899 Mayfield and his sons founded the Celery Cola Company in Birmingham, Alabama.

In 1913 Mayfield purchased the rights to the trade marked term "Dope" from the successors of the National Dope Company of Birmingham. He sold those rights in December to the St. Louis, Missouri-based Koke Company of America which he had founded in 1911.
