= Benjamin F. Porter =

American politician

Benjamin Faneuil Porter (1808–1868) was an American lawyer, reformer, and state legislator in Alabama. A noted advocate of public education, women's rights, and the abolition of the death penalty, Porter helped establish a state penitentiary and to limit the use of execution as a legal punishment. Originally a Whig, he later became a Republican.
