= Champ Lyons =

American judge

Champ Lyons Jr. (born December 6, 1940, in Boston, Massachusetts) was a justice of the Supreme Court of Alabama from 1998 to 2011.

== Biography ==
Champ Lyons, Jr was born to the late Dr. Champ Lyons and the late Naomi Currier Lyons. He attended and graduated from Harvard University, and received his JD from the University of Alabama School of Law. Lyons served as law clerk to U.S. District Court Judge Daniel H. Thomas. He later did private practice in Montgomery, additionally serving as editor of the Young Lawyers' Newsletter. Lyons was named to the Supreme Court's advisory committee on the newly created district courts, and was principal author of the district court rules and small claims court rules. His treatise on civil procedure, Alabama Practice, is now run in its third edition and sees frequent citations by the Supreme Court of Alabama and the Alabama Court of Civil Appeals. Justice Lyons practiced law in the city of Mobile from 1976 to January 1998, at which time he became Legal Advisor to Governor Fob James, Jr. On March 23, 1998, he was appointed to succeed retiring justice Terry L. Butts as an associate justice of the Alabama Supreme Court. Lyons retired from the Supreme Court in 2011. He has a son Champ Lyons III who also currently practices law.
