= Charles R. Malone =

American judge

26th Chief Justice of the Supreme Court of Alabama
- In office 2011 – January 1, 2013
- Nominated by: Robert J. Bentley
- Preceded by: Sue Bell Cobb
- Succeeded by: Roy Moore

Personal details
- Born: c. 1954 (age 71–72)
- Party: Republican

Charles R. "Chuck" Malone (born c. 1954) is a former Chief Justice of the Supreme Court of Alabama, from Tuscaloosa County, Alabama.

== Career ==
Malone was in private practice in Tuscaloosa for twenty years, until his election to the Tuscaloosa County Circuit Court in 2000. He assumed office in 2001, and was re-elected in 2006, serving until 2011, resigning when then-Governor Robert J. Bentley appointed him to the position of Chief of Staff. Later that year, on August 1, 2011, Malone was appointed Chief Justice of the Supreme Court of Alabama by Bentley, to fill the vacancy created by the resignation of Justice Sue Bell Cobb. Malone remained on the court until 2013, having unsuccessfully bid for a full term as Chief Justice, but losing to Roy Moore in the 2012 Republican primaries, and then being succeeded by Moore in January 2013.

Later in 2013, Governor Bentley appointed Malone to a vacancy on the Tuscaloosa County Circuit Court. He remained on the bench until February 29, 2016.

Malone said "I love what I've done for all these years, but I'm still young enough to practice law, and it’s time to do something different".

Political offices
| Preceded by Sue Bell Cobb | Chief Justice of the Supreme Court of Alabama; 2011–2013 | Succeeded by Roy Moore |
