= J. Ed Livingston =

American judge

J. Edwin Livingston (March 17, 1892 – October 15, 1971) was an American jurist and the Twenty-third Chief Justice of the Alabama Supreme Court from 1951 through 1971. He was born in Notasulga, Alabama.

Livingston attended the Alabama Polytechnic Institute (now Auburn University) and the University of Alabama, where he received a law degree in 1918. After graduation, he served in the United States Army for the remainder of World War I. Upon returning home, he set up a law practice in Tuscaloosa, Alabama, as well as serving as a professor of law at the University of Alabama from 1922 to 1940.

Livingston was appointed an associate justice of the Supreme Court of Alabama by Governor Frank M. Dixon on May 9, 1940, and was raised to Chief Justice on February 28, 1951, by Governor Gordon Persons. Livingston was reelected Chief Justice three times, and retired from that position in 1971.

Judge Livingston was a staunch segregationist, who in 1959 declared "I'm for segregation in every phase of life and I don't care who knows it ... I would close every school from the highest to the lowest before I would go to school with colored people."

Livingston married Marie Wise in 1913, and together the couple had two sons, Willard and Edwin.

Legal offices
Preceded by Lucien D. Gardner	Chief Justice of the Supreme Court of Alabama; 1951–1971	Succeeded by Howell Heflin
