= Alva Hugh Maddox =

American jurist (1930–2020)

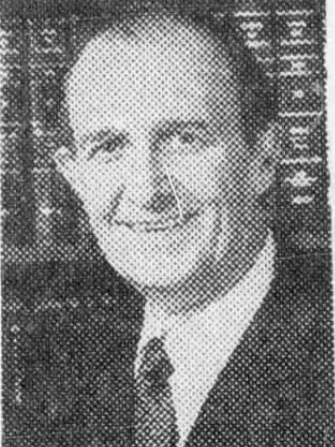
- Maddox in 1982

Associate Justice of the Supreme Court of Alabama
- In office October 1, 1969 – January 15, 2001
- Appointed by: Albert Brewer
- Preceded by: newly created seat
- Succeeded by: R. Bernard Harwood Jr.

Personal details
- Born: April 17, 1930 Covington County, Alabama
- Died: December 11, 2020 (aged 90) Montgomery, Alabama
- Party: Democratic
- Spouse: Virginia Roberts (m. 1958)
- Children: 1 son, 1 daughter
- Education: University of Alabama (B.A., J.D.)

Alva Hugh Maddox (April 17, 1930 – December 11, 2020) was an American jurist who served as a justice of the Supreme Court of Alabama from 1969 to 2001.

== Biography ==
Born in Covington County, Alabama, to parents Christopher Columbus and Audie L. (née Freeman) Maddox, he attended the University of Alabama, graduating in 1952 and receiving his J.D. degree from its law school in 1957. He served in the Korean War, and retired from the Air Force Reserve in 1982 as a colonel after 30 years of service.

Maddox was admitted to the bar in 1957 and clerked for the Alabama Court of Civil Appeals. The following year, he was a law clerk for the U.S. District Court of Alabama. In 1959, he started working as an attorney in Montgomery. From 1961 to 1963, he served as a circuit judge for the 15th Judicial Circuit, after which term he served as legal adviser to Governor George Wallace in 1965, Governor Lurleen Wallace in 1967, and Governor Albert Brewer in 1968. Brewer appointed Maddox as an associate justice of the Supreme Court of Alabama on September 23, 1969, to a newly created seat, and was sworn in on October 1, 1969. He served until his retirement as a senior associate justice on January 15, 2001. During his 31 years on the court, he wrote 1,650 majority opinions, and he is the longest-serving Associate Justice of the Alabama Supreme Court, having been elected five times following his appointment. He authored the treatise Alabama Rules of Criminal Procedure, which is featured in two scenes in the film My Cousin Vinny.

On June 14, 1958, he married Virginia Roberts, and they had two children. He died on December 11, 2020, in Montgomery, Alabama.

== Electoral history ==
1970 general election: Alabama Supreme Court
Party	Candidate	Votes	%
Democratic	Alva Hugh Maddox	481,662	100.0

1976 general election: Alabama Supreme Court
Party	Candidate	Votes	%
Democratic	Alva Hugh Maddox	~670,000	100.0

1982 primary election: Alabama Supreme Court
Party	Candidate	Votes	%
Democratic	Alva Hugh Maddox	439,273	69.3
Democratic	Lawrence A. Anderson	194,423	30.7

1982 general election: Alabama Supreme Court
Party	Candidate	Votes	%
Democratic	Alva Hugh Maddox	674,986	78.6
Republican	Harry Lyons	184,056	21.4

1988 general election: Alabama Supreme Court
Party	Candidate	Votes	%
Democratic	Alva Hugh Maddox	685,114	58.0
Republican	Donald Collins	495,541	42.0

1994 general election: Alabama Supreme Court
Party	Candidate	Votes	%
Democratic	Alva Hugh Maddox	691,424	100.0
