= Edmund S. Dargan =

American judge

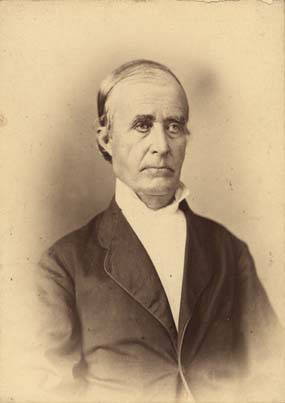

Member of the U.S. House of Representatives from Alabama's 1st district
- In office March 4, 1845 – March 3, 1847
- Preceded by: James Dellet
- Succeeded by: John Gayle

Member of the Alabama Senate
- In office 1844

Personal details
- Born: Edmund Strother Dargan; April 15, 1805 Wadesboro, North Carolina
- Died: November 22, 1879 (aged 74) Mobile, Alabama
- Party: Democratic

Edmund Strother Dargan (April 15, 1805 – November 22, 1879) was a U.S. representative from Alabama, and then a representative to the Confederate States Congress during the American Civil War.

Son of William and Frances Dargan, he was born near Wadesboro, North Carolina, Dargan pursued preparatory studies at home. He then studied law and was admitted to the bar in Wadesboro in 1829. Later, he moved to Washington, Alabama, where he commenced the practice of law and was for several years a Justice of the Peace. He moved to Montgomery in 1833 and to Mobile in 1841. He served as judge of the circuit court, Mobile district, in 1841 and 1842. He served in the Alabama State Senate in 1844 and was the mayor of Mobile in 1844.

Dargan was elected as a Democrat to the Twenty-ninth Congress (March 4, 1845 – March 3, 1847). He did not seek renomination in 1846.

He subsequently served as associate justice of the State supreme court in 1847, and in 1849 became chief justice. He resigned in December 1852 and resumed the practice of law. Dargan served as delegate to a called state convention in 1861, where he delivered a speech calling for Alabama to formally secede from the United States.

During the Civil War, he served as member of the first Confederate States House of Representatives. After the war, he resumed the practice of law in Mobile, Alabama, and died there on November 22, 1879. He was interred in Magnolia Cemetery.

U.S. House of Representatives
Preceded by James Dellet	Member of the U.S. House of Representatives from Alabama's 1st congressional district 1845-1847	Succeeded by John Gayle
