= James R. Dowdell =

American judge

Chief Justice of Alabama Supreme Court
- In office 1909–1914
- Preceded by: John R. Tyson
- Succeeded by: John C. Anderson

Personal details
- Born: April 2, 1847 Chambers County, Alabama, US
- Died: June 21, 1921 (aged 74)
- Relatives: Elizabeth Caroline Dowdell (aunt)

James Render Dowdell (April 2, 1847 – June 21, 1921) was an American jurist and the 20th Chief Justice of the Alabama Supreme Court from 1909 to 1914.

== Background and career ==
Dowdell was born in Chambers County, Alabama, the son of Congressman James Ferguson Dowdell. He attended grammar school in LaFayette, Alabama and secondary school in Auburn, before attending the University of Alabama for two years. He then attended East Alabama Male College, graduating in 1867.

While preparing for the bar exam, Dowdell taught school in LaFayette. Upon his admission to the bar, Dowdell began to practice law in Opelika, Alabama in 1870 with William J. Samford. Dowdell was appointed solicitor of the Ninth Judicial Circuit in 1876, and judge of the Fifth Circuit in 1888. In 1896, Dowdell was named chancellor of the Northeastern Division, and in 1898 was named an associate justice of the Alabama Supreme Court.

Dowdell was named by Governor Braxton Bragg Comer Chief Justice of the Alabama Supreme Court in 1909. He served in that position until his resignation in 1914. Dowdell returned to LaFayette until his death in 1921.

== Family ==
Dowdell's nephew was Armstead Brown, who served on the Florida Supreme Court.

Legal offices
Preceded by John R. Tyson	Chief Justice of the Supreme Court of Alabama; 1909–1914	Succeeded by John C. Anderson
