= Samuel A. Beatty =

American judge

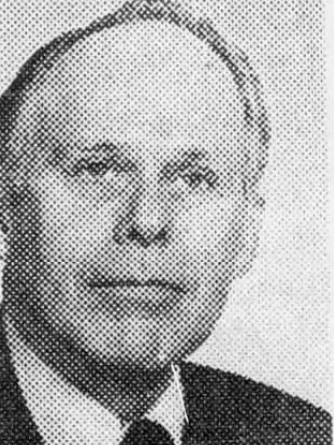
Beatty in 1982

Samuel Alston "Sam" Beatty (April 23, 1923 – May 21, 2014) was an American jurist and educator. After serving as a bomber pilot in World War II, he became a law professor and lawyer. In 1976, he was appointed to the Alabama Supreme Court, where he won another term in 1982. He retired from the court in 1989.

== Early life ==
Born and raised in Tuscaloosa, Alabama, Beatty graduated from Tuscaloosa High School in 1939. He was enrolled as a student at the University of Alabama when he and his friends listened to the news broadcast of the Japanese attack on Pearl Harbor on December 7, 1941. They immediately went to Van De Graft Airfield and took the Army Air Corps Air Cadet entrance examination. He passed.

== Military service ==
After qualifying as a B-25 pilot, Beatty was sent to the Solomon Islands as part of the 69th Bomb Squadron of the 13th Air Force, where he flew 62 combat missions against Japanese air fields such as Kahili and Rabaul, and Japanese shipping. He was sent home in 1944 to become a B-25 instructor at Turner Air Field in Albany, GA. He was discharged in 1945 and returned home to Tuscaloosa, where he took full advantage of the G.I. Bill to complete his studies at the University of Alabama.

== Education ==
He received his B.S. in 1948. During 1949 he served as a Veterans Service Office and married Maude Applegate Beatty, also from Tuscaloosa, whom he met at the University. He enrolled in the University of Alabama School of Law (LLB) in 1950. He graduated first in his class in 1953.

== Career ==
Beatty practiced law in Tuscaloosa, Alabama, with the firm of Dominick, Rosenfeld & Nicol from 1953 to 1955.

At the request of Dean Leigh Harrison, in 1955 Beatty left law practice and joined the faculty at the University of Alabama School of Law, where he taught until 1970. Again at Dean Harrison's suggestion, Beatty applied for and was awarded a Ford Foundation fellowship to pursue graduate studies at Columbia University during the school year 1958-9. He received his LL.M. from Columbia in 1959, and his J.S.D. from Columbia in 1964. His faculty advisor at Columbia was Herbert Wechsler. Beatty was a visiting professor of law at the University of Cincinnati School of Law during 1966-7. In 1970, he left Tuscaloosa to become Dean of the Walter F. George School of Law at Mercer University. Beatty left Mercer to become the Senior Trust Officer at Trust Company Bank in Macon. In 1974, he returned to Alabama to become an Assistant Attorney General in charge of the Civil Division under then Attorney General Bill Baxley (a former law student at Alabama).

In 1975, he returned to Tuscaloosa to open a law firm. In 1976, a group of former students, including Edward L. Hardin, Jr., persuaded Beatty to enter the Democratic primary to run for a seat on the Alabama Supreme Court, which he won. The incumbent, Pelham J. Merrill, then retired, and Governor Wallace appointed Beatty on June 1, 1976, to serve the remainder of Merrill's unexpired term. Beatty was reelected in 1982, and retired from the court in 1989.

== Death ==
He died in Birmingham, Alabama at age 91.
