= List of Alpha Delta Pi chapters =

Alpha Delta Pi is an international collegiate sorority founded at Wesleyan College. Following is a list of Alpha Delta Pi chapters. Active chapters are indicated in bold. Inactive chapters and institutions are in italics.

Chapter	Charter date and range	Institution	City or county	State or province	Status	Ref.
Alpha	May 15, 1851 – 1915	Wesleyan College	Macon	Georgia	Inactive	(Note: This chapter originated as the Adelphean Society (local) in 1851. It renamed itself as Alpha chapter of Alpha Delta Pi in 1905, on the eve of national expansion.) (Note: In an August 1912 report published in the Adelphean, Ms. Newell Mason, a faculty member at Wesleyan and the Historian for Alpha Delta Pi, noted that "College authorities are violently opposed to sororities." A ten-year battle to remain was fought by several NPC organizations but lost in 1917 when the last members of the four sororities on campus, Alpha Delta Pi, Phi Mu, Zeta Tau Alpha and Delta Delta Delta, graduated. Since then, Greeks have not been allowed to re-establish on the campus.)
Beta	March 25, 1905 – 1909	Salem College	Winston-Salem	North Carolina	Inactive	
Gamma	Spring 1906–1910	Mary Baldwin College	Staunton	Virginia	Inactive	(Note: Chapter formed from Delta Delta Sigma (local), established in 1901.) (Note: The 1930 History notes that faculty opposed fraternities, so Gamma became inactive in 1910.)
**Delta**	June 7, 1906	University of Texas at Austin	Austin	Texas	Active	
**Epsilon**	November 2, 1906 – 1977; 2013	Tulane University	New Orleans	Louisiana	Active	
**Zeta**	February 16, 1907	Southwestern University	Georgetown	Texas	Active	(Note: Beta Sigma (local), established in 1899.)
**Eta**	March 21, 1907 – June 1909; 1931	University of Alabama	Tuscaloosa	Alabama	Active	(Note: Pi Kappa Kappa (local), established in 1904. After going dormant, it reformed from Beta Phi (local), established in 1927.)
Theta	June 10, 1908 – 1970	Lawrence University	Appleton	Wisconsin	Inactive	(Note: Zeta Omega Chi (local), established in 1904.)
**Iota**	January 16, 1909	Florida State University	Tallahassee	Florida	Active	(Note: Theta Sigma (local), established in 1908.)
Kappa (First)	March 21, 1910 – 1919	Judson College	Marion	Alabama	Moved	(Note: Chapter formed from Alpha Nu Sigma (local), established in 1908. The 1930 History notes that faculty opposition to fraternities led to the closure of the chapter in 1919 and the transfer of many of its members to Howard College (now Samford University).) (Note: Judson College closed in 2021.)
**Lambda**	April 14, 1910	Brenau University	Gainesville	Georgia	Active	(Note: Chapter formed from Alpha Beta Tau (local), established in 1904.)
Mu	November 7, 1910 – 1913	Woman's College of Alabama	Montgomery	Alabama	Inactive	
Nu	November 10, 1910 – 1960	Randolph College	Lynchburg	Virginia	Inactive	
**Xi**	June 2, 1914	Ohio University	Athens	Ohio	Active	(Note: Chapter formed from the Cryterian Club (local), established in 1914.)
Omicron	June 2, 1911 – 2021	Duke University	Durham	North Carolina	Inactive	(Note: Chapter formed from V.d.W. Club (local), established in 1904.) (Note: At the time of installation, Duke was known as Trinity College.)
**Pi**	June 3, 1911	Iowa State University	Ames	Iowa	Active	(Note: Chapter formed from Inomeme Feliae (local), established in 1904.)
**Rho**	December 16, 1911 – 1965; 1987	Boston University	Boston	Massachusetts	Active	(Note: Delta Chi Omicron (local), established in 1898. After going dormant, it reformed from a colony in 1986.)
**Sigma**	March 28, 1912	University of Illinois at Urbana-Champaign	Champaign	Illinois	Active	(Note: Chapter formed from Alpha Alpha (local), established in 1907.)
**Tau**	May 15, 1912	University of Kansas	Lawrence	Kansas	Active	
**Upsilon**	October 5, 1912	Washington State University	Pullman	Washington	Active	(Note: Chapter formed from Theta Kappa (local), established in 1909.)
**Phi**	June 2, 1913	Hanover College	Hanover	Indiana	Active	(Note: Chapter formed from Pi Alpha Tau (local), established in 1907.)
**Chi**	November 20, 1913	Wittenberg University	Springfield	Ohio	Active	(Note: Chapter formed from Gamma Beta Gamma (local), established on March 4, 1913.)
**Psi**	December 6, 1913	University of California, Berkeley	Berkeley	California	Active	(Note: Chapter formed from the Carnarvon Club (local), established in 1910.)
**Omega**	May 29, 1914 – 1985; 2017	Louisiana State University	Baton Rouge	Louisiana	Active	(Note: This chapter originated as Sigma Beta Tau (local), established in February 1913. After going dormant, it was reformed from a colony in 2017.)
Alpha Alpha	September 14, 1914 – 1972; 1981–1985	University of Colorado	Boulder	Colorado	Inactive	(Note: Chapter formed from Kappa Delta Phi (local), established in 1910. After going dormant, it reformed as a colony in 1980.)
**Alpha Beta**	January 15, 1915	University of Iowa	Iowa City	Iowa	Active	(Note: Chapter formed from Theta Pi (local), established in 1908.)
**Alpha Gamma**	April 16, 1915	University of Missouri	Columbia	Missouri	Active	(Note: Chapter formed from Emanon Club (local), established in 1914.)
Alpha Delta	June 10, 1915 – 1976	Colby College	Waterville	Maine	Inactive	(Note: Chapter formed from Alpha Phi Alpha (local), established in 1905.)
Alpha Epsilon	June 11, 1915 – 1934; 1963–2022	University of Nebraska–Lincoln	Lincoln	Nebraska	Inactive	(Note: Chapter formed from Owasco (local), established in 1910, but which itself had emerged from a high school girls club called the J.U.G. (Just Us Girls), formed in 1907 or 1908). Owasco was an American Indian term meaning a bridge. After going dormant, this chapter was restored from a colony in 1962.)
**Alpha Zeta**	October 12, 1916 – 1998; April 21, 2024	Southern Methodist University	University Park	Texas	Active	
**Alpha Eta**	September 30, 1915	Kansas State University	Manhattan	Kansas	Active	(Note: Chapter formed from Alpha Mu (local), established in 1914.)
**Alpha Theta**	April 25, 1917	University of Washington	Seattle	Washington	Active	(Note: Chapter formed from Alpha Delta (local), established in 1915.)
**Kappa (Second)**	September 9, 1919	Samford University	Homewood	Alabama	Active	(Note: Chapter formed from Sigma Tau Delta (local).) (Note: The 1930 History notes that this charter had been transferred (~Moved) to Howard College. Many of the chapter's Judson members transferred to Howard College, bringing the charter with the "adroit approval" of the 1919 Convention. The transfer was prompted by the opposition of Judson College faculty to fraternities and the chapter's closure in 1919. Judson eventually closed in 2021.) (Note: The name Samford University was adopted in 1965 when the school achieved university status.)
**Alpha Iota**	February 15, 1920 – 1943; 1946	University of Pittsburgh	Pittsburgh	Pennsylvania	Active	(Note: Chapter formed from the Sorosis Club (local), established on October 6, 1916. After going dormant, it reformed as a colony in 1945.)
**Alpha Kappa**	May 1, 1920	University of Tennessee at Knoxville	Knoxville	Tennessee	Active	(Note: Chapter formed from S.B.P. (local), established in 1917.)
Alpha Lambda	May 20, 1920 – 1986	University of Oregon	Eugene	Oregon	Inactive	(Note: Chapter formed from Alpha Delta (local), established in 1919.)
Alpha Mu	June 5, 1920 – 1934	University of Wisconsin	Madison	Wisconsin	Inactive	
Alpha Nu	June 16, 1920 – 1982	University of New Mexico	Albuquerque	New Mexico	Inactive	(Note: Chapter formed from Kappa Delta Nu (local), established in 1916.)
**Alpha Xi**	June 14, 1921 – 2002; March 29, 2026	Ohio State University	Columbus	Ohio	Active	(Note: Chapter formed from Kappa Phi Delta (local), established in 1919.)
**Alpha Omicron**	September 1, 1921 – 1936; 1939	Oklahoma State University–Stillwater	Stillwater	Oklahoma	Active	(Note: Chapter formed from Alpha Delta (local), established in 1918. After going dormant, it reformed from the Adelphian (local), established in 1939.)
**Alpha Pi**	February 24, 1922 – 1969; 1997	George Washington University	Washington	District of Columbia	Active	(Note: Chapter formed from Theta Lambda Sigma (local), established in 1920. After going dormant, it reformed as a colony in 1996.)
Alpha Rho	June 16, 1923 – 1987	University of Minnesota	Minneapolis	Minnesota	Inactive	(Note: At dissolution, the chapter house that had been occupied by Alpha Rho was sold to the Unification Church (the "Moonies"). After several decades the building was purchased and extensively renovated by Kappa Sigma. In 2023 the ΚΣ group vacated the property which was leased to other student groups.)
Alpha Sigma	October 5, 1923 – 1937; 1949–1967	Ohio Wesleyan University	Delaware	Ohio	Inactive	(Note: Chapter formed from Sigma Tau Epsilon (local), established in 1922.)
Alpha Tau	June 1924 – 1935; 1946–1973	Syracuse University	Syracuse	New York	Inactive	(Note: Chapter formed from Theta Delta Phi (local), established in 1923. After going dormant, it reformed as a colony in 1945.)
Alpha Upsilon	June 10, 1924 – 1987	West Virginia University	Morgantown	West Virginia	Inactive	(Note: Chapter formed from Alpha Theta Zeta (local), established in 1918.)
Alpha Phi	April 4, 1925 – 1933	Butler University	Indianapolis	Indiana	Inactive	(Note: Chapter formed from Chi Phi Alpha (local), established in 1923.)
**Alpha Chi**	April 25, 1925	University of California, Los Angeles	Los Angeles	California	Active	(Note: Chapter formed from Iota Kappa (local), established in 1920, which itself originated as a group called the Merry Maids, earlier that same year. The name was changed as the group thought it was "without enough dignity for a college group". A professor of Greek assisted them in determining the Greek words for Merry Maids, from which the first letters were Iota and Kappa.)
**Alpha Psi**	September 12, 1925	University of Southern California	Los Angeles	California	Active	(Note: Chapter formed from Delta Pi (local), established in 1919.)
Alpha Omega	February 6, 1926 – 1996	Oregon State University	Corvallis	Oregon	Inactive	(Note: Chapter formed from Xi Beta (local), established in 1919.)
**Beta Alpha**	May 18, 1926 – 1952; 1984	Indiana University	Bloomington	Indiana	Active	(Note: Chapter formed from Kappa Tau (local), established in 1922.)
**Beta Beta**	May 21, 1926	University of Tennessee at Chattanooga	Chattanooga	Tennessee	Active	(Note: Chapter formed from Kappa Theta Lambda (local), established on February 8, 1920. This group's original name was the Saki Gana Club. It was renamed before seeking national affiliation.)
Beta Gamma	February 4, 1927 – 1974	University of Utah	Salt Lake City	Utah	Inactive	(Note: Chapter formed from Delta Theta (local), established in 1926.)
Beta Delta	June 14, 1927 – 1964	Hunter College of CUNY	New York City	New York	Inactive	(Note: Chapter formed from Omega Iota (local), established in 1901.)
**Beta Epsilon**	February 18, 1928	University of South Carolina	Columbia	South Carolina	Active	(Note: Chapter formed from the Scarabean Club (local), established in 1924.)
Beta Zeta	1929–1942	University of Toronto	Toronto	Ontario, Canada	Inactive	(Note: Chapter formed from Upsilon Tau (local), established in 1928.)
**Beta Eta**	1929	University of Michigan	Ann Arbor	Michigan	Active	(Note: Chapter formed from Phi Gamma Mu (local), established in 1924.)
Beta Theta	1930–2024	University of Manitoba	Winnipeg	Manitoba, Canada	Inactive	(Note: Chapter formed from Theta Rho Kappa (local), established in 1930.)
**Beta Iota**	1931	Queens University of Charlotte	Charlotte	North Carolina	Active	(Note: Chapter formed from Chi Sigma Alpha (local), established in 1924.)
**Beta Kappa**	1931	University of British Columbia	Vancouver	British Columbia, Canada	Active	
Beta Lambda	1931–1972	Brooklyn College of CUNY	Brooklyn	New York	Inactive	
Beta Mu	1932–1935	Montana State University	Bozeman	Montana	Inactive	(Note: Chapter formed from the Alphadelts (local), established in 1931.)
**Beta Nu**	1933	University of Georgia	Athens	Georgia	Active	
Beta Xi	1933–1943	University of Montana	Missoula	Montana	Inactive	(Note: Chapter formed from Zeta Chi (local), established in 1929.)
Beta Omicron	1935–1983	St. Lawrence University	Canton	New York	Inactive	(Note: Chapter formed from Phi Omega Phi (local), established in 1924.)
Beta Pi	1935–1997	University of Cincinnati	Cincinnati	Ohio	Inactive	(Note: Chapter formed from the Epsilon chapter of Phi Delta, established in 1924..)
Beta Rho	1936–1961	Lake Forest College	Lake Forest	Illinois	Inactive	(Note: Chapter formed from Kappa Kappa Chi, established in 1919.)
**Beta Sigma**	1936	Mercer University	Macon	Georgia	Active	(Note: Chapter formed from Delta Kappa (local), established in 1930.)
**Beta Tau**	1938	University of Akron	Akron	Ohio	Active	(Note: Chapter formed from Sigma Delta Theta, established in 1920.)
**Beta Upsilon**	1939	University of North Carolina at Chapel Hill	Chapel Hill	North Carolina	Active	
**Beta Phi**	1940	University of Maryland, College Park	College Park	Maryland	Active	(Note: Chapter formed from Alpha Delta (local), established in 1937.)
Beta Chi	1940–1973	Queens College of CUNY	Queens	New York	Inactive	(Note: Chapter formed from Gamma Phi (local), established in 1937.)
**Beta Psi**	1941	University of Kentucky	Lexington	Kentucky	Active	
**Beta Omega**	1942	Auburn University	Auburn	Alabama	Active	(Note: Chapter formed from Alpha Delta (local), established in 1941.)
Gamma Alpha	1943–1970	University of Connecticut	Storrs	Connecticut	Inactive	
Gamma Beta	1944–1971, 2001–2006	Northwestern University	Evanston	Illinois	Inactive	
**Gamma Gamma**	1946	Florida Southern College	Lakeland	Florida	Active	(Note: Chapter formed from Zeta Zeta Zeta, established in 1939.)
**Gamma Delta**	1947–1976, 2004	University of Miami	Coral Gables	Florida	Active	
Gamma Epsilon	1947–1993	Purdue University	West Lafayette	Indiana	Inactive	
Gamma Zeta	1947–1969	University of Oklahoma	Norman	Oklahoma	Inactive	
**Gamma Eta**	1947	University of Memphis	Memphis	Tennessee	Active	(Note: Chapter formed from Sigma Alpha Mu, established in 1913.)
**Gamma Theta**	1947	University of Mount Union	Alliance	Ohio	Active	(Note: Chapter formed from Zeta Kappa Phi, established in 1945.)
**Gamma Iota**	1948	University of Florida	Gainesville	Florida	Active	
**Gamma Kappa**	1948	West Virginia Wesleyan College	Buckhannon	West Virginia	Active	(Note: Chapter formed from Kappa Phi Omega, established in 1925.)
**Gamma Lambda**	1949	University of Rhode Island	Kingston	Rhode Island	Active	(Note: Chapter formed from Tau Alpha Epsilon, established in 1947.)
**Gamma Mu**	1949	Missouri State University	Springfield	Missouri	Active	(Note: Chapter formed from Alpha Beta Zeta, established in 1932.)
Gamma Nu	1949	William Jewell College	Liberty	Missouri	Inactive	(Note: Chapter formed from Tau Nu Tau, established in 1919.)
**Gamma Xi**	1950	University of California, Santa Barbara	Santa Barbara	California	Active	(Note: Chapter formed from Gamma Delta Chi, established in 1931.)
**Gamma Omicron**	1950	Susquehanna University	Selinsgrove	Pennsylvania	Active	(Note: Omega Delta Sigma, established in 1917.)
**Gamma Pi**	1950	Wagner College	Staten Island	New York	Active	(Note: Chapter formed from Tau Lambda Chi, established in 1941.)
Gamma Rho	1950-2025	Arizona State University	Tempe	Arizona	Inactive	(Note: Chapter formed from Philomathean Club (local), established in 1903.)
Gamma Sigma	1951–1990	Bowling Green State University	Bowling Green	Ohio	Inactive	(Note: Chapter formed from Theta Phi, established in 1945.)
**Gamma Tau**	1951	University of Vermont	Burlington	Vermont	Active	(Note: Chapter formed from Beta Chi Alpha, established in 1950.)
**Gamma Upsilon**	1953	University of North Texas	Denton	Texas	Active	(Note: Delta Chi Delta, established in 1935.)
**Gamma Phi**	1954	East Tennessee State University	Johnson City	Tennessee	Active	(Note: Chapter formed from Pi Sigma (local), established in 1915.)
**Gamma Chi**	1955	Texas Christian University	Fort Worth	Texas	Active	
Gamma Psi	1956–1960	University of Houston	Houston	Texas	Inactive	(Note: Chapter formed from Kappa Sigma Nu, established in 1942.)
Gamma Omega	1956–1979	Michigan State University	East Lansing	Michigan	Inactive	
**Delta Alpha**	1959	Emory University	Atlanta	Georgia	Active	(Note: Chapter formed from Adelphians (local), established in 1954.)
**Delta Beta**	1956	Lamar University	Beaumont	Texas	Active	(Note: Chapter formed from Revelers (local), established in 1923.)
**Delta Gamma**	1957–2005, 2008	University of Arizona	Tucson	Arizona	Active	
**Delta Delta**	1957	University of Arkansas	Fayetteville	Arkansas	Active	
Delta Epsilon	1957–2003	Morningside College	Sioux City	Iowa	Inactive	(Note: Chapter formed from Pi Kappa Alpha, established in 1907.)
Delta Zeta	1958–1972	Wayne State University	Detroit	Michigan	Inactive	(Note: Chapter formed from Zeta Chi, established in 1926.)
**Delta Eta**	1958	McNeese State University	Lake Charles	Louisiana	Active	(Note: Chapter formed from Delta Alpha Delta, established in 1951.)
**Delta Theta**	1958	Valdosta State University	Valdosta	Georgia	Active	(Note: Chapter formed from Sigma Alpha Omega, established in 1953.)
Delta Iota	1958–1999	Waynesburg College	Waynesburg	Pennsylvania	Inactive	(Note: Chapter formed from Theta Pi Sigma, established in 1906)
**Delta Kappa**	1958–1975, 1992	Pennsylvania State University	State College	Pennsylvania	Active	(Note: Chapter formed from Pyrose (local), established in 1956. After going dormant, it reformed as a colony in 1991.)
Delta Lambda	1958–1984	West Texas A&M University	Canyon	Texas	Inactive	(Note: Chapter formed from Kappa Phi Tau, established in 1939.)
**Delta Mu**	1959	Sam Houston State University	Huntsville	Texas	Active	(Note: Chapter formed from the C. B. Literary Society, established in 1929.)
**Delta Nu**	1959	Southeast Missouri State University	Cape Girardeau	Missouri	Active	(Note: Chapter formed from Hesperian (local), established in 1914.)
Delta Xi	1959–1973	Pittsburg State University	Pittsburg	Kansas	Inactive	
**Delta Omicron**	1960	East Carolina University	Greenville	North Carolina	Active	(Note: Chapter formed from Kappa, established in 1959.)
**Delta Pi**	1960	Ripon College	Ripon	Wisconsin	Active	(Note: Chapter formed from Pi Tau Pi, established in 1945.)
**Delta Rho**	1961	Gettysburg College	Gettysburg	Pennsylvania	Active	
**Delta Sigma**	1961–1997, 2013	University of Mississippi	Oxford	Mississippi	Active	
Delta Tau	1961–1982	East Texas A&M University)	Commerce	Texas	Inactive	(Note: Chapter formed from Kalir (local), established in 1919.) (Note: Texas A&M University at Commerce changed its name to East Texas A&M University on 7 November 2024.)
**Delta Upsilon**	1961	University of Tennessee at Martin	Martin	Tennessee	Active	
**Delta Phi**	1962	University of Missouri–Kansas City	Kansas City	Missouri	Active	(Note: Chapter formed from Sigma Beta, established in 1936.)
Delta Chi	1962–1998	University of Northern Colorado	Greeley	Colorado	Inactive	
Delta Psi	1964–1987	Eastern New Mexico University	Portales	New Mexico	Inactive	
Delta Omega	April 25, 1964 – 202x ?	Northern Illinois University	DeKalb	Illinois	Inactive	(Note: Chapter formed from Phi Pi Omega, established in 1960.)
Epsilon Alpha	1964–1984	Minnesota State University	Moorhead	Minnesota	Inactive	(Note: Chapter formed from Beta Chi, established in 1932.)
Epsilon Beta	1965–1986	Texas A&M University-Kingsville	Kingsville	Texas	Inactive	(Note: Chapter formed from Alpha Sigma, established in 1927.)
Epsilon Gamma	1965–1983	Marquette University	Milwaukee	Wisconsin	Inactive	(Note: Chapter formed from Delta Sigma Gamma, established in 1930.)
**Epsilon Delta**	1965	Western Kentucky University	Bowling Green	Kentucky	Active	(Note: Chapter formed from Pi Sigma Upsilon, established in 1958.)
**Epsilon Epsilon**	1966	Texas Tech University	Lubbock	Texas	Active	
**Epsilon Zeta**	1966	Texas State University	San Marcos	Texas	Active	(Note: Chapter formed from Delta Sigma Delta, established in 1903.)
**Epsilon Eta**	1966–1983, 1985–1988, 2013	Mississippi State University	Starkville	Mississippi	Active	
Epsilon Theta	1966–1983	West Liberty University	West Liberty	West Virginia	Inactive	(Note: Chapter formed from Phi Delta Alpha, established in 1928.)
Epsilon Iota	1966–1977	Indiana University of Pennsylvania	Indiana	Pennsylvania	Inactive	(Note: Chapter formed from Alpha Theta Nu, established in 1963.)
**Epsilon Kappa**	1967	Troy University	Troy	Alabama	Active	(Note: Chapter formed from Tau Omega, established in 1966.)
**Epsilon Lambda**	1967	University of South Florida	Tampa	Florida	Active	(Note: Chapter formed from Tri-Sis Club (local), established in 1961.)
**Epsilon Mu**	1967	University of Northern Iowa	Cedar Falls	Iowa	Active	(Note: Chapter formed from Pi Tau Phi, established in 1925.)
**Epsilon Nu**	1967	Ashland University	Ashland	Ohio	Active	(Note: Chapter formed from Phi Kappa Pi.)
**Epsilon Xi**	1967	Northern Arizona University	Flagstaff	Arizona	Active	
**Epsilon Omicron**	1967	Murray State University	Murray	Kentucky	Active	
**Epsilon Pi**	1967	Georgia Southern University	Statesboro	Georgia	Active	(Note: Chapter formed from Gamma Sigma Upsilon, established in 1955.)
**Epsilon Rho**	1968	University of Nevada, Las Vegas	Las Vegas	Nevada	Active	(Note: Chapter formed from Phi Delta Chi, established in 1967.)
Epsilon Sigma	1968–1984	University of Maine	Orono	Maine	Inactive	
**Epsilon Tau**	1969	Middle Tennessee State University	Murfreesboro	Tennessee	Active	(Note: Chapter formed from Kappa Tau Delta, established in 1966.)
Epsilon Upsilon	1969–1984	Winona State University	Winona	Minnesota	Inactive	
**Epsilon Phi**	1969	Eastern Kentucky University	Richmond	Kentucky	Active	(Note: Chapter formed from Delta Theta Pi, established in 1966.)
**Epsilon Chi**	1969	Longwood University	Farmville	Virginia	Active	
**Epsilon Psi**	1969	Tennessee Technological University	Cookeville	Tennessee	Active	(Note: Chapter formed from Pi Omega, established in 1965.)
**Epsilon Omega**	1969	Jacksonville University	Jacksonville	Florida	Active	(Note: Chapter formed from Kappa Kappa Alpha, established in 1967.)
**Zeta Alpha**	1970	California State University, Fullerton	Fullerton	California	Active	(Note: Chapter formed from Delta Chi Delta, established in 1961.)
**Zeta Beta**	1971	North Carolina State University	Raleigh	North Carolina	Active	
**Zeta Gamma**	1971	University of North Carolina at Charlotte	Charlotte	North Carolina	Active	(Note: Chapter formed from Alpha Tau, established in 1968.)
Zeta Delta	1971–2025	University of Montevallo	Montevallo	Alabama	Inactive	(Note: Chapter formed from Alpha Theta Pi, established in 1966.)
**Zeta Epsilon**	1972	University of West Florida	Pensacola	Florida	Active	(Note: Chapter formed from Kappa Chi Delta.)
**Zeta Zeta**	1972–1983, 2009	Augusta University	Augusta	Georgia	Active	
**Zeta Eta**	1973	University of North Alabama	Florence	Alabama	Active	
**Zeta Theta**	1973	Illinois State University	Normal	Illinois	Active	(Note: Chapter formed from Alpha Lambda Kappa.)
**Zeta Iota**	1974	Georgia College and State University	Milledgeville	Georgia	Active	
Zeta Kappa	1974–1979	Radford University	Radford	Virginia	Inactive	
**Zeta Lambda**	1975	Texas A&M University	College Station	Texas	Active	
**Zeta Mu**	1975	Appalachian State University	Boone	North Carolina	Active	(Note: Chapter formed from Vernican Society, established in the 1930s.)
**Zeta Nu**	1976	Clemson University	Clemson	South Carolina	Active	
**Zeta Xi**	1977	University of Virginia	Charlottesville	Virginia	Active	(Note: Chapter formed from Alpha Pi, established in 1976.)
**Zeta Omicron**	1977	Georgia Institute of Technology	Atlanta	Georgia	Active	(Note: Chapter formed from Tau Beta Alpha, established in 1975.)
**Zeta Pi**	1977	University of San Diego	San Diego	California	Inactive	
**Zeta Rho**	1978	Vanderbilt University	Nashville	Tennessee	Active	(Note: Chapter formed from Pi Lambda, established in 1977.)
**Zeta Sigma**	1979	College of Charleston	Charleston	South Carolina	Active	
**Zeta Tau**	1979	Winthrop University	Rock Hill	South Carolina	Active	(Note: Chapter formed from Delta Delta Kappa, established in 1978.)
**Zeta Upsilon**	1982	Oakland University	Auburn Hills	Michigan	Active	(Note: Chapter formed from Sigma Iota, established in 1977.)
**Zeta Phi**	1980	Francis Marion University	Florence	South Carolina	Active	(Note: Chapter formed from Pi Delta Alpha, established in 1979.)
**Zeta Chi**	1980	Baylor University	Waco	Texas	Active	
**Zeta Psi**	1981	University of North Carolina at Greensboro	Greensboro	North Carolina	Active	
**Zeta Omega**	1982	University of Central Florida	Orange County	Florida	Active	(Note: Chapter formed from Delta Pi, established in 1980.)
**Eta Alpha**	1983	University of North Carolina Wilmington	Wilmington	North Carolina	Active	(Note: Chapter formed from Phi Beta Psi, established in 1981.)
**Eta Beta**	1983	Allegheny College	Meadville	Pennsylvania	Active	
**Eta Gamma**	1983	Austin Peay State University	Clarksville	Tennessee	Active	
Eta Delta	1983–1997	Southern Polytechnic State University	Marietta	Georgia	Inactive	(Note: Chapter formed from Tau Beta Sigma, established in 1981.)
**Eta Epsilon**	1984	Miami University	Oxford	Ohio	Active	
**Eta Zeta**	1985	University of Southern Mississippi	Hattiesburg	Mississippi	Active	
**Eta Eta**	1986	South Dakota School of Mines and Technology	Rapid City	South Dakota	Active	(Note: Chapter formed from Sisters of Sphinx (local), established in 1981.)
Eta Theta	1987–1993	University of North Carolina at Asheville	Asheville	North Carolina	Inactive	(Note: Chapter formed from Delta Beta, established in 1986.)
Eta Iota	1988–1993	University of La Verne	La Verne	California	Inactive	(Note: Chapter formed from Delta Delta Epsilon, established in 1983.)
Eta Kappa	1988–202x ?	California State University, San Bernardino	San Bernardino	California	Inactive	
**Eta Lambda**	1987	Albright College	Reading	Pennsylvania	Active	(Note: Chapter formed from Pi Alpha Tau, established in 1926.)
Eta Mu	1988–2005	California State University, Sacramento	Sacramento	California	Inactive	(Note: Chapter formed from Delta Pi Kappa, established in 1984.)
**Eta Nu**	1989	Saint Louis University	St. Louis	Missouri	Active	(Note: Chapter formed from Kappa Beta Phi, established in 1928.)
**Eta Xi**	1990	Presbyterian College	Clinton	South Carolina	Active	
**Eta Omicron**	1990	Western Connecticut State University	Danbury	Connecticut	Active	(Note: Chapter formed from Lambda Gamma Chi, established in 1988.)
**Eta Pi**	1990	Virginia Tech	Blacksburg	Virginia	Active	
**Eta Rho**	1990	California State University, Chico	Chico	California	Active	
Eta Sigma	1991–2005	San Diego State University	San Diego	California	Inactive	
Eta Tau	1991–2010	Bishop's University	Sherbrooke	Quebec, Canada	Inactive	(Note: Chapter formed from Kappa Pi Phi, established in 1989.)
**Eta Upsilon**	1991–1995, 2009	Wake Forest University	Winston-Salem	North Carolina	Active	(Note: Chapter formed from Phoenix Society (local), established in 1982.)
**Eta Phi**	1994	Furman University	Greenville	South Carolina	Active	(Note: Chapter formed from the Delphian Society (local), established in 1981.)
Eta Chi	1995–2010	Villanova University	Villanova	Pennsylvania	Inactive	
Eta Psi	1998–2004	Valparaiso University	Valparaiso	Indiana	Inactive	(Note: Chapter formed from Delta Chi Epsilon, established in 1944.)
**Eta Omega**	2000	Centre College	Danville	Kentucky	Active	
**Theta Alpha**	2005	Northwest Missouri State University	Maryville	Missouri	Active	(Note: Chapter formed from Tau Phi Upsilon, established in 1990.)
**Theta Beta**	2007	Coastal Carolina University	Conway	South Carolina	Active	
**Theta Gamma**	2008	Sonoma State University	Rohnert Park	California	Active	(Note: Chapter formed from Chi Delta, established in 2001.)
**Theta Delta**	2008	University of Delaware	Newark	Delaware	Active	
Theta Epsilon	2008–2021	Methodist University	Fayetteville	North Carolina	Inactive	(Note: Chapter formed from Adelphian Society (local), established in 2007.)
**Theta Zeta**	2009	Washington and Lee University	Lexington	Virginia	Active	
Theta Eta	2009–2024	Drake University	Des Moines	Iowa	Inactive	
**Theta Theta**	2009	Quinnipiac University	Hamden	Connecticut	Active	
**Theta Iota**	2009	Bucknell University	Lewisburg	Pennsylvania	Active	
**Theta Kappa**	2009	Florida Atlantic University	Boca Raton	Florida	Active	
**Theta Lambda**	2011	Franklin and Marshall College	Lancaster	Pennsylvania	Active	
**Theta Mu**	2011	Loyola University Chicago	Chicago	Illinois	Active	
**Theta Nu**	2012	Christopher Newport University	Newport News	Virginia	Active	
**Theta Xi**	2012	University of Central Oklahoma	Edmond	Oklahoma	Active	
**Theta Omicron**	2012	James Madison University	Harrisonburg	Virginia	Active	
**Theta Pi**	2013	Santa Clara University	Santa Clara	California	Active	
**Theta Rho**	2013	Sacred Heart University	Fairfield	Connecticut	Active	
**Theta Sigma**	2013	West Chester University	West Chester	Pennsylvania	Active	
Theta Tau	2014–2020	University of Pennsylvania	Philadelphia	Pennsylvania	Inactive	
**Theta Upsilon**	2014	Shorter University	Rome	Georgia	Active	(Note: Chapter formed from Epsilon Sigma, established in 1870.)
**Theta Phi**	2014	University of Louisiana at Lafayette	Lafayette	Louisiana	Active	
**Theta Chi**	2014	Charleston Southern University	North Charleston	South Carolina	Active	
**Theta Psi**	2015	Rollins College	Winter Park	Florida	Active	
**Theta Omega**	2015	University of California, Riverside	Riverside	California	Active	
**Iota Alpha**	2016	University of Texas at San Antonio	San Antonio	Texas	Active	
**Iota Beta**	2016	Campbell University	Buies Creek	North Carolina	Active	
**Iota Gamma**	2017	University of California, Davis	Davis	California	Active	
Iota Delta	2017–2025	Sewanee: The University of The South	Sewanee	Tennessee	Inactive	
**Iota Epsilon**	2017	University of North Florida	Jacksonville	Florida	Active	
