= Letitia Dowdell Ross =

American educator and a leader of women's civic and patriotic organizations

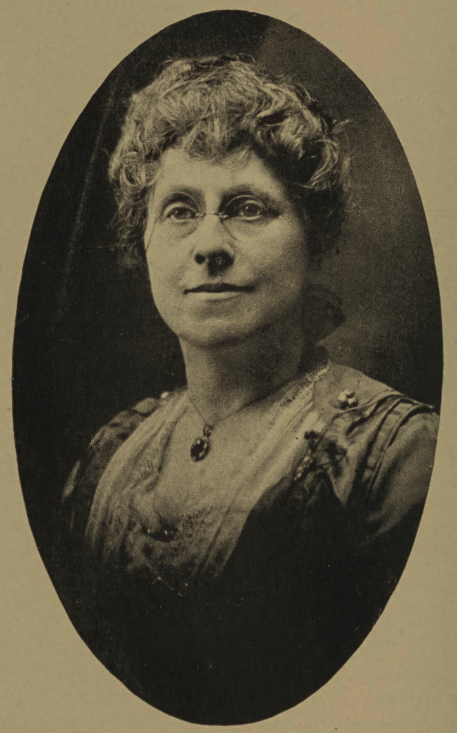
- Ross circa 1920

President, Alabama Division of the United Daughters of the Confederacy

President, Alabama Federation of Women's Clubs

Personal details
- Born: Letitia Roane Dowdell; 1866 Chambers County, Alabama, U.S.
- Died: 1952 (aged 85–86)
- Spouse: Bennett Battle Ross II
- Parent: Elizabeth Thomas Dowdell (mother)
- Relatives: James F. Dowdell (uncle); James R. Dowdell (cousin); William J. Samford (cousin)
- Education: Lucy Cobb Institute; University of Georgia; Alabama Polytechnic Institute; University of Berlin
- Occupation: educator; non-profit executive
- Known for: Ross Hall at Auburn University

Letitia Dowdell Ross (1866–1952) was an American educator who was identified with religious, educational, philanthropic and patriotic causes. She was in close touch with the large scientific movements of the time. Ross served as the president of the Alabama Division of the United Daughters of the Confederacy (UDC), and president of the Alabama Federation of Women's Clubs (AFWC).

== Early life and education ==
Letitia Roane Dowdell was born in Chambers County, Alabama, in 1866. She was the daughter of the Col. William Crawford Dowdell, of Auburn, Alabama. Her mother was Elizabeth Thomas Dowdell, a woman prominent and influential in the Woman's Missionary Society of the Methodist Episcopal Church, South and for thirty years president of the society of Alabama. Letitia's grandparents were Lewis and Elizabeth (Farley) Dowdell, of East Georgia, and William Callahan and Catherine (Dowdell) Thomas. Letitia was also a niece of Colonel James F. Dowdell, who commanded the Thirty-seventh Regiment, Confederate States of America, and for several years before the civil war was a member of the U.S. Congress from the East Alabama district. She was also a first cousin of James R. Dowdell, Chief Justice of the Alabama Supreme Court, and of William J. Samford, Governor of Alabama.

During the civil war, Col. W. C. Dowdell served under General James Holt Clanton, while Mrs. Dowdell was active in patriotic and relief work, caring for sick and wounded soldiers in her own home for months at a time.

Ross graduated from Lucy Cobb Institute (Athens, Georgia). She also pursued courses at the University of Georgia and Alabama Polytechnic Institute (Auburn, 1890–91), and still later at the University of Berlin (1901).

== Career ==
On August 18, 1897, she married Bennett Battle Ross II, Alabama State Chemist, Dean of the College of Agriculture of the Alabama Polytechnic Institute, Professor of Chemistry and Acting President. Her husband's work brought Mrs. Ross into close connection with educational work.

For several years, she taught in the State Normal College (now Jacksonville State University, Jacksonville, Alabama), Martin Female College (Pulaski, Tennessee), and North Texas Female College (Sherman, Texas), as well as in Washington City.

For a number of years, Ross was prominently associated with UDC work, especially since the organization of the Admiral Semmes Chapter, of Auburn. For several terms, she served as President, Alabama Division. She also held the positions of recording secretary and first vice-president in the state division and frequently was a delegate to the general convention, UDC. She served as First Vice-President-General and Vice-Chair of the Committee on Education. She also served on the Columbia Prize Essay Committee and on the Historical Books Committee, as well as Chair of the Committee on Memorial Highways, Historic Places and Events. Among noteworthy achievements of her administration as President of the Alabama Daughters (UDC), Ross planned and carried to successful completion the celebration in Montgomery, Alabama, February 18, 1911, of the fiftieth anniversary of the inauguration of Jefferson Davis as President of the Confederate States.

Ross held various important positions including: president, Alabama Federation Women's Clubs (1900 or 1909); president, Alabama division, UDC (1909–11); first vice-president general, UDC; vice-president, Alabama Conference, Woman's Missionary Society of the Methodist Episcopal Church, South (1904–06); and Director from Alabama, Jefferson Davis Highway. She was a member of the Committee of 100, Woman's Titanic Memorial (1913), and a member of the Daughters of the American Revolution (DAR) where she served on the Committee on International Relations. She was also a club woman - at one time President of the State Federation of Woman’s Clubs, and later Vice-President of the Woman’s Club of Auburn.

During World War I, Ross was involved in many phases of war work. She was a State speaker for the four Great Loans; for the Red Cross Drives, and for the United War Work Drive. She was a four minute speaker in Auburn, and served the local and State Red Cross as well as the YMCA.

== Personal life ==
Ross made her home in Auburn, Alabama. She died in 1952.

Ross Hall at Auburn University is named in her honor.
