= Alice Culler Cobb =

American educator and missionary (1843–1918)

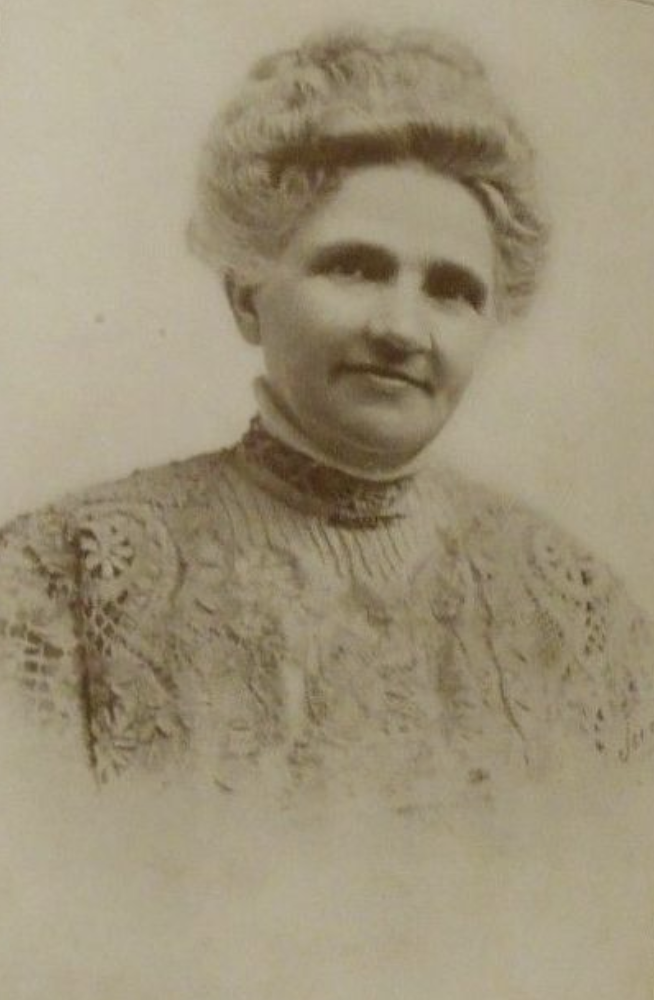
- Born: Alice Rebecca Culler; May 5, 1843; Perry, Georgia, U.S.
- Died: February 20, 1918 (aged 74); Nashville, Tennessee, U.S.
- Resting place: Macon, Georgia
- Other name: "Allie"
- Education: Wesleyan College; LaGrange College
- Occupations: educator; missionary
- Employers: Martha Washington College; Wesleyan College; Woman's Missionary Society of the Methodist Episcopal Church, South
- Spouses: John K. Leak (m. 1862; died 1863); John Boswell Cobb (m. 1870; died 1893)
- Children: 2 daughters
- Parents: Dr. P. B. D. H. Culler (father); Mary S. Cobb Culler (mother)
- Relatives: Howell Cobb (brother-in-law)

Alice Culler Cobb (née Culler; 1843-1918) was an American Southern educator, missionary leader, and clubwoman. For forty-one years, she taught and held administrative positions at Wesleyan College. She was also actively connected with the missionary interests of the Methodist Episcopal Church, South, serving a large part of that time in an official capacity. In 1904, Cobb became Foreign Secretary of the Woman's Board of Foreign Missions; and in 1910, when the Boards were merged, she was elected Secretary of the united Board.

== Early life and education ==
Alice Rebecca (nickname, "Allie") Culler was born in Perry, Georgia, May 5, 1843. Her father was Dr. P. B. D. H. Culler, a practicing physician of Perry, Houston County, and surrounding counties. Her mother was Mary S. Cobb Culler, one of the ninety girls enrolled as pupils at Wesleyan College (first chartered college for women in the U.S.) on January 7, 1839, when the institution started. Alice had a sister, Eugenia, who was two years older.

Cobb attended the public school of her town until the age of twelve, after which she went to Wesleyan College with her older sister. There, she organized the Adelphian Society. She graduated in 1858, as salutatorian, with the degree of A.B.

A year at LaGrange College followed, where she took a post graduate course.

== Career ==
=== Educator ===
At the age of seventeen, she began teaching at Martha Washington College in Abingdon, Virginia, but the Civil War prevented her from finishing one year's work, and she had to return to Georgia, where her first marriage, widowhood after four months, and subsequent teaching followed each other closely.

Very soon, her alma mater called her and she began work in the preparatory department, rising gradually until she became professor of English, the only woman in the faculty holding a chair. When she severed her connection with Wesleyan College 45 years later, she had held the chair of English for 20 years. Thousands of women all over the South had been her students. She was elected lady principal of the college when President William C. Bass resigned.

In May 1904, after forty-one years, Cobb resigned from Wesleyan College.

=== Methodist Episcopal Church, South ===
When the Women's Foreign Missionary Society of the Methodist Episcopal Church, South was organized, Cobb took an active part, serving as president of the conference Missionary Society of Perry, Georgia in 1879. She also served as president of the South Georgia Conference Missionary Society, and corresponding secretary of that organization for 25 years.

In 1904, after her resignation from Wesleyan College, Cobb accepted the salaried position of associate or traveling secretary of the Woman's Missionary Society of the Methodist Episcopal Church, South. In that capacity, she visited Mexico and Cuba during the following winter, examining schools in these countries that were owned by the Woman's Board. For a year after her return, she visited different conferences in the south to report on what she had observed. Cobb also did service in Egypt and Europe. In 1906, she sailed for China, Korea, and Japan. For a year, she studied the needs of the schools in these places, living in the schools, going far into the interior, and learning of their needs.

She became ill in Korea, but didn't realize the seriousness of her illness until eight months after her return to the U.S. where she underwent surgery. Every day of her illness, her stenographer went to the hospital and took dictation, so that the work went on.

In April 1910, Cobb was elected general secretary of the Woman's Board of the Methodist Episcopal Church, South, and permanently located in Nashville, Tennessee.

=== Clubwoman ===
In Macon, Cobb was also prominent in woman's club work. She was president of the City Federation of Women's Clubs and vice-president of the State Federation. She was regent for Georgia of the Daughters of the American Revolution (DAR), president of the Current Topics Club, and president of the Wesleyan Alumnae Association. She took an active interest in the National Geographic Society, and was an active member of the Woman's Christian Temperance Union and United Daughters of the Confederacy.

== Personal life ==
In Perry, Georgia on September 16, 1862, she married the Rev. John K. Leak, president of the Andrew Female College, at Cuthbert, Georgia, who died of smallpox five months later.

After moving to Macon, Georgia, and teaching at Wesleyan, in 1870, she married Maj. John Boswell Cobb (1826–1893), an insurance agent, becoming the stepmother of his two children. The couple had two daughters, Mary Cobb (Pilcher) and Eugenia ("Genie") Cobb (Lowe). Maj. Cobb's brother was Howell Cobb.

== Death and legacy ==
A week before her death, Cobb developed acute pneumonia. She died on February 20, 1918 in Nashville. internment was in Macon.

A portrait of Cobb, the work of Mollie Mason, was unveiled at the opening services of Wesleyan College in September 1924.

Cobb's niece, Mary Culler White, was Cobb's biographer, publishing The Life Story of Alice Culler Cobb in 1925.

The Cobb Alumnae Chair of English at Wesleyan College was installed in honor and in memory of Alice Cobb.
