= Sasnett =

Sasnett is a surname. Notable people with the surname include:

- Daniel Sasnett (born 1978), American professional stock car racing driver
- William J. Sasnett (1820–1865), American educator and university president
