= Mary Banks =

Mary Banks may refer to:

- Mary MacLeod Banks (1861–1951), Scottish folklorist
- Mary Ross Banks (1846–1910), American litterateur and author
- Mary Bankes (c. 1598–1661), English Royalist during the English Civil War
