= Katherine Choy =

American artist and ceramicist (1927–1958)

Katherine Choy

Katherine Choy (1927–1958) was an American artist, known for her work with ceramics and pottery.

== Biography ==
She was born into an affluent family in Hong Kong in 1927, and raised in Shanghai. In 1946, Choy went to study in the United States, first at Wesleyan College in Macon, Georgia. In 1948, she transferred to Mills College to be near family in California, earning her bachelor's degree in 1950 and a master's degree in 1951. In 1952, she became the head of the ceramics department at the Newcomb College at Tulane University in New Orleans. In 1957, she started the Clay Art Center in Port Chester, NY. Choy died of pneumonia at the age of 29.

Her ceramics were traditionally thrown on the wheel but she experimented with bold patterns and a unique palette. Her early pots were inspired by Asian clay traditions; but she eventually moved towards more innovative and modern techniques, setting her apart from her peers. Choy's work is in the collection of the Cooper Hewitt, Smithsonian Design Museum, and the Metropolitan Museum of Art.

== Exhibits ==
In 1953, Choy had a solo exhibit at the New Orleans Museum of Art (NOMA; formerly known as the Delgado Museum) titled Ceramics by Katherine Choy, and had her work featured in the Designer Craftsmen U.S.A. 1953 exhibition, organized by the American Craft Council. She has also had her works shown at institutions including the Brooklyn Museum, the Art Institute of Chicago, and The San Francisco Museum of Art.

In 2022, Choy had her first exhibit at the NOMA, titled "Katherine Choy: Radical Potter in 1950s New Orleans." This exhibit was her first since her friends held The Katherine Choy Memorial Show at the Orleans Gallery in 1959, the year after her death.

In 2026, Choy's Vase was featured in Centering Clay: Connection and Innovation in American Studio Ceramics at Krannert Art Museum in Champaign, Illinois. The work was a gift from Mr. Choy to Krannert Art Museum, University of Illinois Urbana-Champaign, in 1959.
