= Sampson Willis Harris =

American politician (1809–1857)

Member of the U.S. House of Representatives from Alabama
- In office March 4, 1847 – March 3, 1857
- Preceded by: Samuel W. Mardis (3rd); James F. Dowdell (7th)
- Succeeded by: George W. Crabb (3rd); Jabez L. M. Curry (7th)
- Constituency: 3rd district (1847-55); 7th district (1855-57)

Member of the Alabama Senate
- In office 1844-1845

Member of the Georgia House of Representatives
- In office 1834-1835

Personal details
- Born: Sampson Willis Harris; February 23, 1809 Elbert County, Georgia
- Died: April 1, 1857 (aged 48) Washington, D.C.
- Party: Jacksonian

Sampson Willis Harris (1809-1857) was an American politician and lawyer in the states of Georgia and Alabama.

== Early years and education ==
Harris was born on February 23, 1809, in Elbert County, Georgia, to Stephen Willis Harris, a judge of the Superior court, and Sarah Herndon Harris. Young Harris graduated from the University of Georgia in Athens in 1828, studied law, and was admitted to the bar in 1830. Harris established his law practice in Athens.

== Political career ==
Harris was elected to the Georgia House of Representatives in 1833, and served one term from 1834 to 1835.

After moving to Wetumpka, Alabama in 1838, Harris was elected as the solicitor of the eighth circuit in 1841. He then served in the Alabama Senate in 1844 and 1845. Harris was then elected in 1846 to represent Alabama's 3rd congressional district in the United States House of Representatives during the 30th United States Congress and was reelected to three additional terms (31st, 32nd and 33rd Congresses) in that seat from March 4, 1847, until March 3, 1855. Harris won election to Alabama's 7th congressional district in 1854 and served in the 34th Congress and served from March 4, 1855, until March 3, 1857.

== Death and legacy ==
Harris did not seek reelection in 1856 and died on April 1, 1857, in Washington, D. C., less than a month after leaving congressional office. He was survived by his wife, Paulina Harris, and four of his five siblings. A small monument still stands in the Congressional Cemetery in Washington, D.C., commemorating Harris and his work for his country. He was buried in Oconee Hill Cemetery in Athens. His son, Sampson Watkins Harris, was born in Wetumpka, Alabama on March 29, 1828, but later moved to Georgia and graduated from the University of Georgia. Sampson Watkins Harris practiced law, served as a colonel in the Confederate States Army, was Georgia adjutant-general, and was offered appointments to the Supreme Court of Georgia and the position of Georgia Secretary of State, both of which he declined.

U.S. House of Representatives
Preceded by James La Fayette Cottrell	Member of the U.S. House of Representatives from Alabama's 3rd congressional district March 4, 1847 – March 3, 1855	Succeeded by James Ferguson Dowdell
Preceded by James Ferguson Dowdell	Member of the U.S. House of Representatives from Alabama's 7th congressional district March 4, 1855 – March 3, 1857	Succeeded by Jabez Lamar Monroe Curry
