= Clare de Graffenried =

American labor investigator

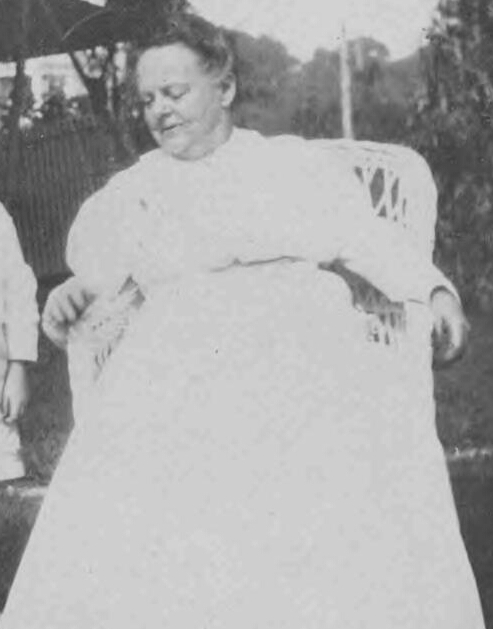
The labor investigator Clare de Graffenried.

Mary Clare de Graffenried (May 19, 1849 – April 26, 1921) was an American labor researcher and writer, who worked as an investigator for the U.S. Department of Labor beginning in 1888. She wrote a number of influential articles on the conditions of working-class people, particularly women and children, including the controversial 1891 essay "The Georgia Cracker in the Cotton Mill." Her work is notable for its early inclusion of scientific data as a basis for rhetorical argument in discussions of the American working class.

== Early life and education ==
Mary Clare de Graffenried, usually known as Clare, was born in Macon, Georgia, in 1849. Her mother was Mary Holt Marsh, and her father was Colonel William Kirkland de Graffenried, a lawyer who had initially opposed secession but eventually came to support the Confederacy in the American Civil War and serve in Georgian Governor Joseph E. Brown's administration.

De Graffenried attended Macon's Wesleyan College, then known as Wesleyan Female College, graduating with honors in 1865, the same year Union troops took control of Macon. As the school's valedictorian, de Graffenried went off-script in her graduation speech, criticizing the troops led by James H. Wilson who were camped in the city. Wilson threatened to shutter the college in response, but he held off after hearing it was an impromptu, non-sanctioned speech.

== Career ==
After spending another decade in Macon, in which time she most likely worked as a schoolteacher, de Graffenried moved to Washington, D.C., in the mid-1870s, apparently due to the postwar economic depression in the South. She taught math, literature, and languages at Georgetown Female Seminary, then, thanks to her father's connections with Interior Secretary L. Q. C. Lamar, she was given a job working in the patent office in 1886.

=== Labor investigator ===
From there, she quickly went to work at the Bureau of Labor, and in 1888 she was appointed as one of the first 20 labor investigators at the renamed Department of Labor. In this role, she traveled across the United States, particularly to the South and the Northeast's textile mill towns, visiting factories and workers' homes to collect data and testimony on working conditions. She also traveled to Europe in 1892 as part of a project comparing working-class life there and in the United States. As a labor researcher, de Graffenried was particularly interested in the living conditions of working-class women and children, as well as the importance of providing working-class families with decent housing. She was one of the first to call for government involvement in the lives of working-class Americans, particularly through child labor laws and public education.

She retired from the Department of Labor in 1906, and she spent four years traveling the world after her retirement.

=== Writing ===
In addition to her work for the Department of Labor, de Graffenried wrote on labor issues for national publications and traveled the country giving lectures on the subject. Her work was innovative at the time in its use of statistical data to back up rhetorical arguments. Alongside Labor Commissioner Carrol D. Wright and others in the new Department of Labor, she drove discussion of working-class Americans away from subjective rhetoric and toward a more statistical analysis. However, while her writing showed a deep concern for the working class, it sometimes leaned into a tone of middle-class condescension toward her subjects.

She is best known for her controversial article "The Georgia Cracker in the Cotton Mill," which was published in February 1891 in The Century Magazine, with illustrations by E. W. Kemble. It was based on her interviews with poor, white mill workers in Georgia. While it was praised in the North as a compelling argument that incorporated detailed research, it drew an angry response in the South, particularly in Georgia, because it was perceived as ridiculing Southern whites. She had described millworkers as "an impressive example of race degeneration," with these white laborers having become "the butt of ridicule, shiftless and inconsequent, always poor though always working." Her depiction of women and children working—amid a "criminal indifference" to child labor laws—as the men of the household lazed around was seen as particularly offensive to Southern social and gender norms. Southern politicians railed against her work, and in the local press, the scandal became known as "The De Graffenried Controversy."

Despite the controversy, the article won the American Economic Association's prize for the year's best essay on wage-earning women. Other influential articles by de Graffenried in this period included 1890's "The Needs of Self-Supporting Women"; 1891's "Essay on Child Labor," which won another prize from the American Economic Association for the year's best essay on labor issues; and 1896's "Need Of Better Homes for Wage-Earners." She also sometimes wrote about her adopted home city, including the 1896 study "Typical Alley Houses in Washington," the first scientific study of Washington's alley life.

== Personal life ==
De Graffenried lived in Washington, D.C., until her death in 1921. She turned her home at 1935 7th St NW into a "house museum" of antiques and souvenirs of her travels to Europe and Asia. She moved in the city's high-society circles, associating with the likes of first lady Ellen Axson Wilson, but was also described as an "original type" who "never gave a thought to her personal appearance." She never married.
