= Elizabeth Caroline Dowdell =

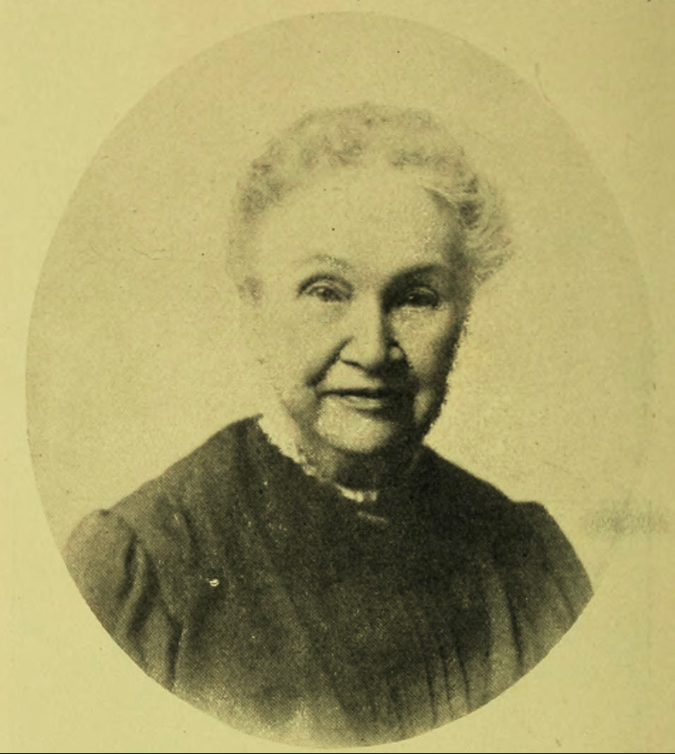
Elizabeth Caroline Dowdell

Elizabeth Caroline Dowdell (née Thomas; 1829–1909) was an American leader of women's patriotic and religious organizations. She was the first woman to preside over a deliberative body of women in the State of Alabama. She was also the first woman in the U.S. who suggested the organization of the missionary society in connection with the church, and by her efforts, put into operation the Woman's Missionary Society of the Methodist Episcopal Church, South (WMS of the MEC,S). Dowdell served as Secretary of the national United Daughters of the Confederacy (UDC).

== Early life ==
Elizabeth Caroline Thomas was born at Lagrange, Georgia, December 3, 1829. When a child, she moved with her parents. Mr. and Mrs. W. C. Thomas, to Chambers County, Alabama.

== Career ==
During Antebellum South days and after, Dowdell was associated with many of the notable men and women of the South, both of Church and State, and established herself as one of the great women in the South. She was the first woman in the nation who suggested the organization of the missionary society in connection with the church, and by her efforts, put into operation the WMS of the MEC,S. She wrote Bishop James Osgood Andrew in 1861, making the suggestion, but failed to sign her name, probably because the suggestion was such an innovation in religious matters, but the idea so impressed the senior bishop of the MEC,S that he advertised to know the author of the letter. This resulted in a correspondence which ultimately eventuated in the organization of the Woman's Foreign Missionary Society, with which organization Dowdell had since been in close and active connection as one of the board of managers. She organized the society in Alabama, and from its organization to the time of her death (31 years) she was its president.

Dowdell often spoke before large congregations and religious bodies and was known to promote missionary work. Dowdell was a frequent contributor to the religious journals and periodicals of the county. For nearly half a century, the Dowdell home in Auburn, Alabama was visited often.

Dowdell was prominent in Daughters of the American Revolution (DAR) circles of Alabama.

In Mrs. Kirkpatrick's introduction of Letitia Dowdell Ross (Mrs. B. B. Ross), President of the Alabama Division, UDC, she pays a tribute to Elizabeth Caroline Dowdell, Mrs. Ross's mother:—

"Soon after the war a young woman in her Alabama home dreamed a dream and saw a vision, and she wrote to the bishop of a great denomination : 'You men say you could never have borne the brunt of the battle if it had not been for the organized work of the women at home. Why not then organize the women of your Church to work for Christ as we worked for our soldiers:' And the great bishop pondered wisely and well, and ten years later the women of his denomination banded together to work for women in heathen lands. Is it not a matter of pride to us that this great thought originated in the brain of one of our own women. Mrs. Crawford Dowdell, of Auburn, who was placed at the head of the organization in her own Slate and was probably the first Alabama woman to preside over an assemblage of women? To-day I have the honor to introduce to you the worthy daughter of this worthy mother, your efficient State President, Mrs. B. B. Ross, who will now take charge of the Convention."

== Personal life ==
In June 1847, she married Col. William Crawford Dowdell. Of their eleven children, seven survived to adulthood, Mrs. L D. Merrick, James S. Dowdell, Silas C. Dowdell, Andrew L. Dowdell, Mrs. K. D. Lipscomb, Letitia Dowdell Ross (Mrs. B. B. Ross), and Mrs. C. H. Davis.

W. C. Dowdell, the husband, was one of the foremost men in East Alabama. He was a brother of Col. James F. Dowdell and an uncle of Hon. William J. Samford, Governor of Alabama, and of Judge James R. Dowdell, Chief Justice of the Alabama Supreme Court.

Elizabeth Dowdell died at her home in Auburn, Alabama, on August 16, 1909, after a sudden illness became fatal.

In 1977, she was a nominee to the Alabama Women's Hall of Fame.
