= Harrell International Institute =

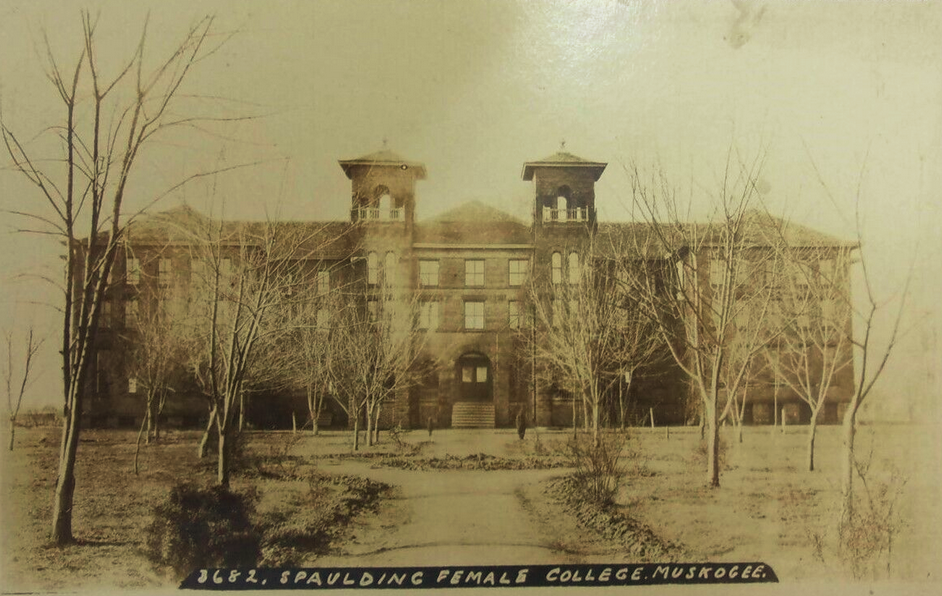
Spaulding Female College

Harrell International Institute (also known as Harrell Institute; later, Spaulding Institute and Spaulding Female College; est. 1871) was an American Christian missionary school established in Muskogee, Indian Territory, in 1871. Controlled by the Woman's Missionary Society of the Methodist Episcopal Church, South, it was possibly the first self-supporting school among the Native Americans in the United States. Successor institutions were the Spaulding Institute and later, the Spaulding Female College.

== History ==
Harrell International Institute (also known as Harrell Institute ) was established in 1881, at Muskogee, Indiana Territory. It was under the control of the Woman's Missionary Society of the Methodist Episcopal Church, South and was named in honor of the missionary, Rev. John Harrell. Rev. T. F. Brewer, A. M., founder and builder of the institution, served as its president. It was possibly the first self-supporting school among the Native Americans in the United States.

In 1888, the school entered the term with a degree of prosperity which it has never before had, the Woman's Board of Missions making every effort to insure its success. The Board appropriated money to furnish the building and the necessary improvements in the way of outbuildings, and so forth. Brewer was assisted by five Christian women teachers. The number of students enrolled up to that year, 118; 45 of whom were in the collegiate department. The music class numbered 25; the art class, 15. All the rooms in the boarding department were now full, but in a few more weeks there will be room for accommodating four more girls. The superintendent expressed the opinion that if there was room for them, 30-40 more girls could be secured for the school.

Its handsome structure was enlarged during the 1890 summer vacation, at a cost of US$3,000. There were 36 rooms, ample in size, with fixtures necessary to the comfort of its pupils. There were five departments in the institute, viz: Collegiate, Academic, Primary, Music, and Art. The expenses incurred in 1890 in anticipation of an enlarged patronage of the school were justified in the fact that up to that date 114 students had matriculated. The women in charge of the different departments were well qualified.

== Spaulding Female College ==
In 1895, many improvements were made. The grounds were ornamented, trees having been set out, drives laid off, and flower beds arranged. The buildings were supplied with hot and cold water and baths and were heated by hot air. New electric motors were installed to drive the fans and new furniture put in. After H. B. Spaulding donated thousands of dollars for substantial improvements to the school, the institution was renamed "Spaulding Institute" in his honor.

In 1896, there are 185 students enrolled at "Spaulding Female College". The music and elocution departments were especially successful, enrolling 96 and 27 pupils respectively. There were as many girls in 1896 as there were girls and boys both in 1895. There was no loss in patronage occasioned by limiting the institution to girls. Ten states and territories were represented in the student body. The faculty consisted of 14 trained teachers. The property was valued at US$75,000.
