= Ruth Austin Knox =

Ruth Austin Knox (born June 18, 1953 in Augusta, Georgia) was the president of Wesleyan College, located in Macon, Georgia. She was installed as Wesleyan's twenty-fourth president in 2003 and served until mid-2017. A 1975 graduate (as a Golden Heart), she is Wesleyan's first alumna president and its second woman president.

Before becoming president, Knox was a lawyer in private practice in Atlanta, Georgia. She is a 1978 graduate of the University of Georgia School of Law, magna cum laude, Phi Beta Kappa, and Order of the Coif. From 1985-1988, she was president of the Wesleyan Alumnae Association. She chaired the Alumnae Campaign to fund teaching chairs for the College from 1990-1993, and became a member of the board of trustees in 1993. Knox became chairman in 1994, and served in that position until she was appointed acting president in May 2002.
