= Viola Ross Napier =

American politician

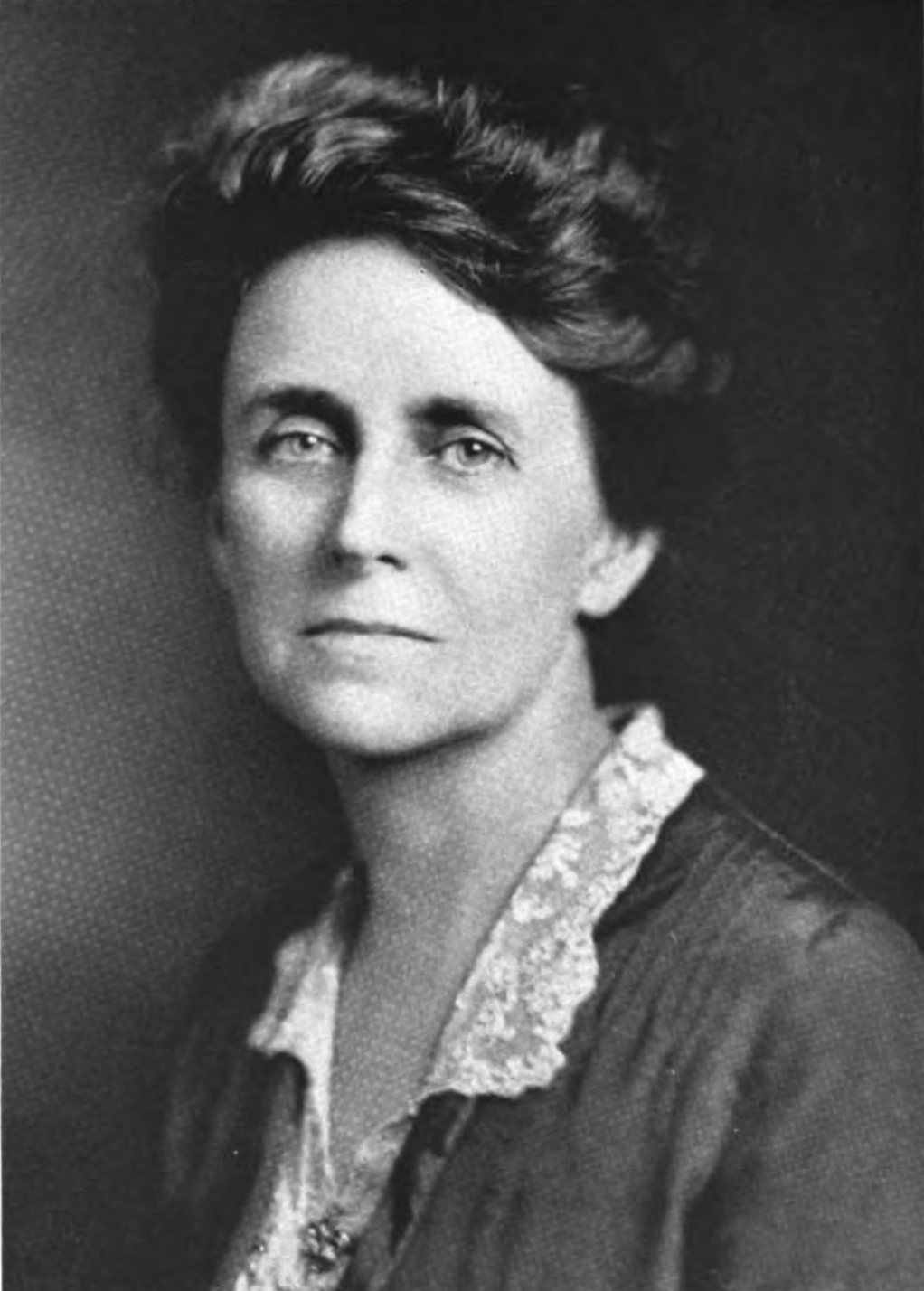

Member of the Georgia House of Representatives
- In office 1923–1926

Personal details
- Born: Viola Ross; February 14, 1881 Macon, Georgia, U.S.
- Died: June 27, 1962 (aged 81)
- Spouse: Hendley V. Napier Jr.
- Children: 4
- Education: Wesleyan College
- Occupation: lawyer

Viola Ross Napier (1881–1962) was, along with Bessie Kempton, one of the first two women elected to the House of Representatives in the U.S. state of Georgia following the passage of the 19th Amendment to the U.S. Constitution which gave women the right to vote. Napier was also the first female lawyer to argue in front of the Georgia Court of Appeals and the Georgia Supreme Court. In 1993 she was posthumously inducted into the Georgia Women of Achievement.

== Early life ==
Viola Felton Ross was born in Macon, Georgia on February 14, 1881. Her grandfather from her mother's side was one of the city's founders. After graduating in 1901 from Wesleyan College, she became a schoolteacher. During her teaching career she met and married a lawyer, Hendley Napier Jr., in 1907. They had four children together. Shortly after, her husband died as a result of the flu epidemic of 1919. After losing both her husband and father-in-law, she decided to go back to school; she attended Judge "Lije" Maynard's night school in Macon, studying to become a lawyer.

== Legislature life ==
It was uncommon for women in the early 1900s to become lawyers, and Napier found it difficult to obtain a job. She decided to open her own practice. She became the first female lawyer to argue in front of both the Georgia Court of Appeals and the Georgia Supreme Court. She also became the first woman to successfully obtain a pardon for a convicted client before they served any part of their sentence.

After the approval of the 19th Amendment in 1920, which allowed women to vote, the editor of the Macon News persuaded Napier to run for General Assembly and became one of the first two women elected to the House of Representatives in Georgia. During her time in the Georgia General Assembly, she introduced several bills that were sponsored by the League of Women Voters, an organization that encouraged women to use their new power to participate in shaping public policy. The bills covered compulsory education, child labor reform, and recommendations from the Children’s Code Commission. She secured adoption of laws requiring better fire protection in orphanages, schools and children's hospitals. She also sponsored a bill to improve education for the blind, the handicapped, and the underprivileged, and introduced a bill to prevent child labor.

Napier remained in the House of Representatives for a second term and was defeated when she ran for a third term.

A collection of her papers are held at the Middle Georgia Archives in the Washington Memorial Library in Macon.
