= Wesleyan College =

Private college in Macon, Georgia, US

- Former names: Georgia Female College (1836–1843); Wesleyan Female College (1843–1917)
- Motto: Scientia et pietas (Latin); "Knowledge and loyalty"
- Motto in English: Knowledge and devotion
- Type: Private liberal arts women's college
- Established: Chartered: 1836; 190 years ago Opened: 1839; 187 years ago
- Religious affiliation: United Methodist Church
- Endowment: $69,000,000
- President: Meaghan Blight
- Faculty: 52
- Undergraduates: 614 (women only)
- Postgraduates: 35 (coed)
- Location: Macon, Georgia, US; 32.8745862°N 83.7124689°W
- Campus: Suburban
- Colors: (Purple and lavender)
- Nickname: Wolves (formerly Pioneers)
- Website: wesleyancollege.edu
- Wesleyan College Historic District
- U.S. National Register of Historic Places
- U.S. Historic district
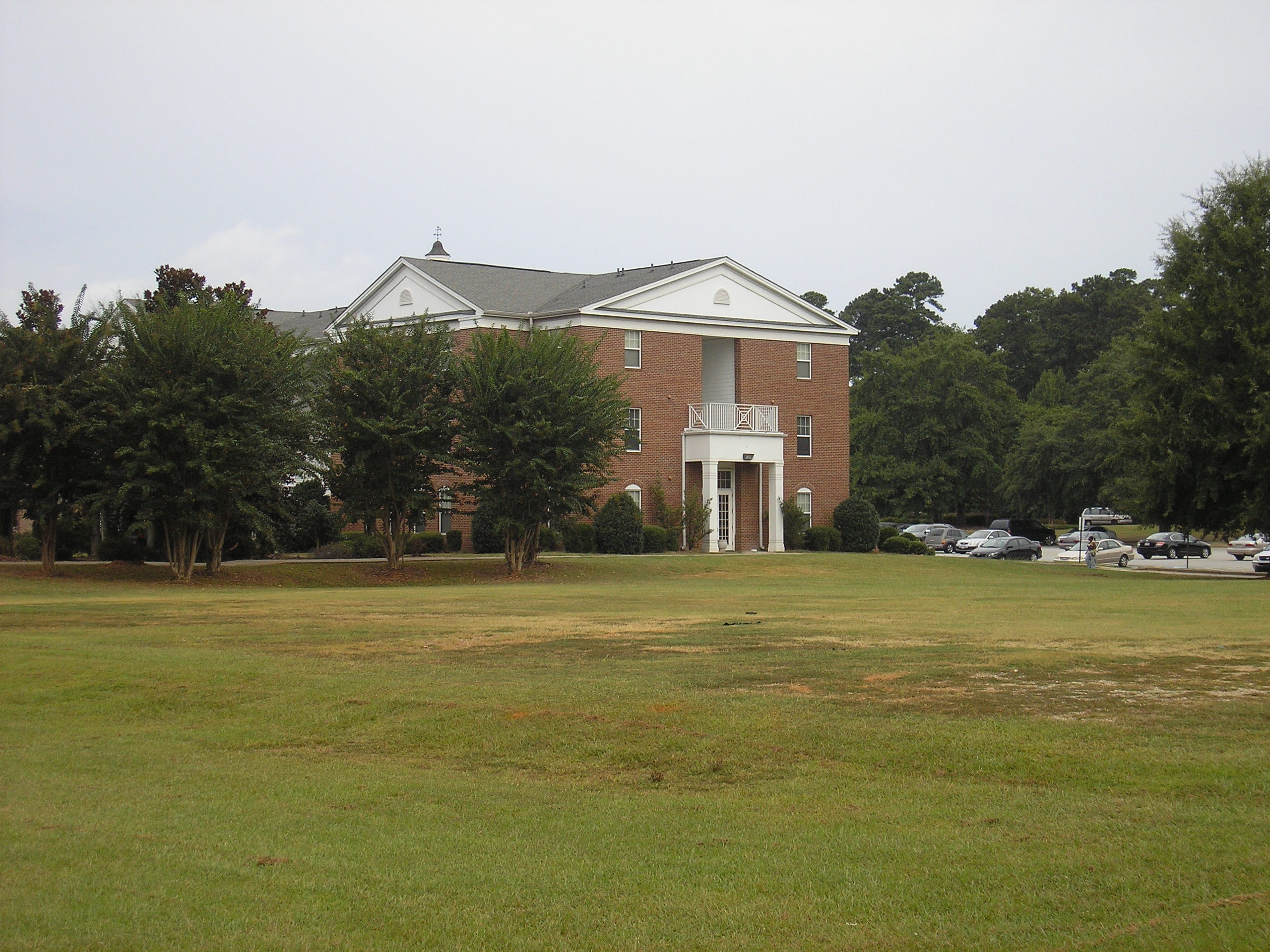

- Location within Georgia Location within the United States
- Location: 4760 Forsyth Rd., Macon, Georgia
- Area: 200 acres (80.9 ha)
- Built: 1928
- Architects: Walker & Weeks; et al.
- Architectural style: Colonial Revival
- NRHP reference No.: 04000242
- Added to NRHP: April 2, 2004
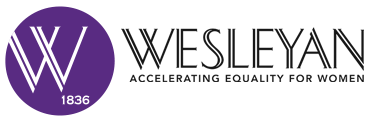

Wesleyan College is a private, liberal arts women's college in Macon, Georgia, United States. Founded in 1836, Wesleyan was the first college in the world chartered to grant degrees to women. It opened in 1839, two years after the opening of Mount Holyoke College.

Academic rankings

Baccalaureate
- Washington Monthly: 3

Regional
- U.S. News & World Report: 6

== History ==
The school was chartered on December 23, 1836, as the "Georgia Female College", and it opened its doors to students on January 7, 1839. The school was renamed as "Wesleyan Female College" in 1843, when its affiliation changed from the Methodist-Episcopal Church to the Methodist Episcopal Church, South. The college shortened its name in 1917 to the present "Wesleyan College".

Wesleyan has the world's oldest alumnae association, begun in 1859. Wesleyan College is the birthplace of the first sororities in the United States: the Adelphean Society in 1851, now known as Alpha Delta Pi, and the Philomathean Society in 1852, now known as now Phi Mu. The two sororities together are referred to as the "Macon Magnolias". In 1914, the school ended all social sororities on its campus.

An illustration of Wesleyan College in Macon, Georgia circa 1877

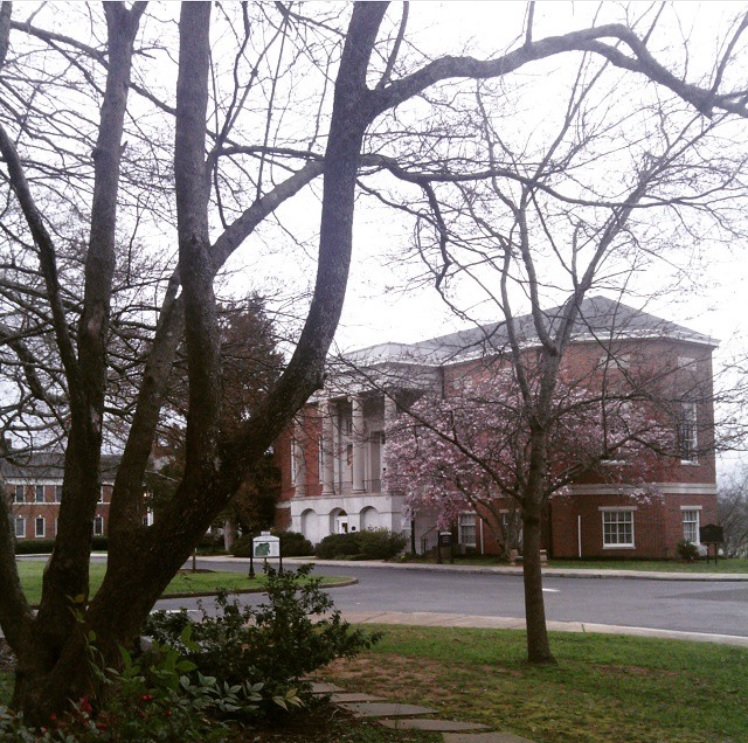
Cherry blossoms bloom in front of Candler Hall

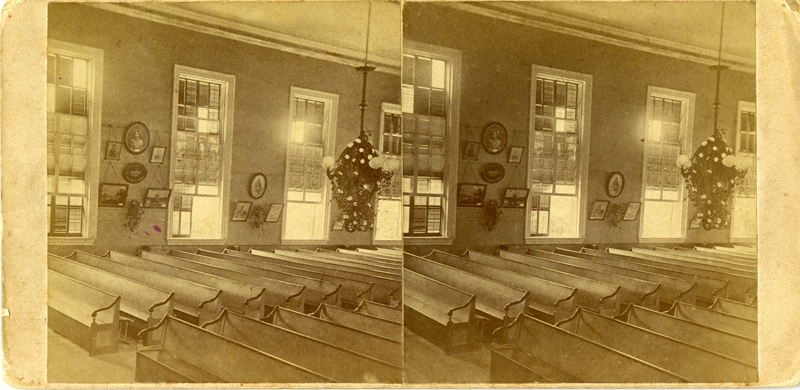
Chapel at Wesleyan College, circa 1876

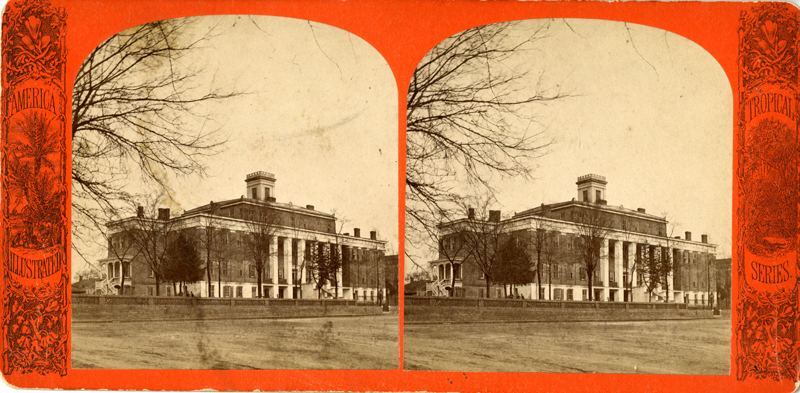
Wesleyan College circa 1877

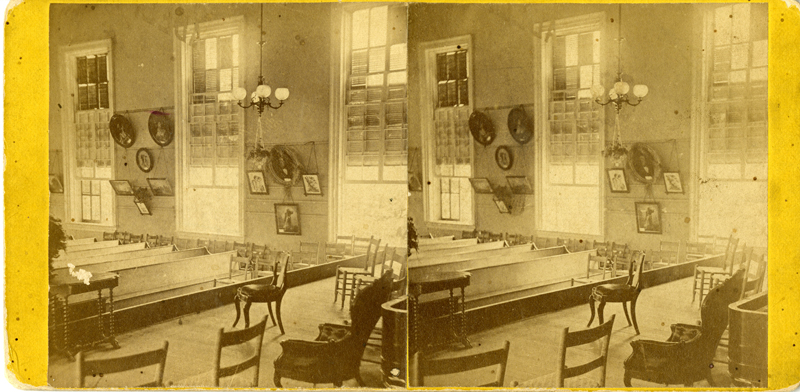
Wesleyan College Chapel circa 1876

== Academics ==
Faculty of Wesleyan College circa 1880 displayed in Sholes' directory of the city of Macon, 1880

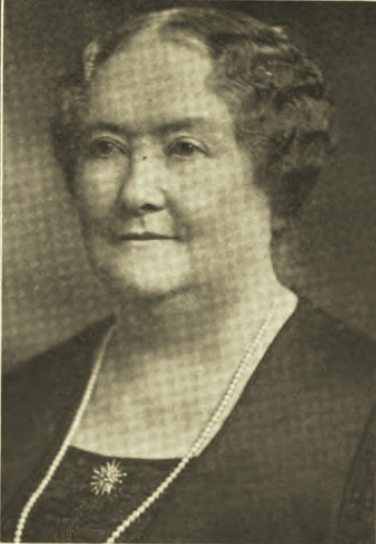
Allie Luse Dick, teacher of voice, 1882-85.

Wesleyan College has an undergraduate student population of around 600 with an acceptance rate of 62.1% and average high school GPA of 3.28. It has a student-faculty ratio of 7:1. In any given year, students from more than 20 states and over 20 countries around the world attend the college. Wesleyan offers 25 majors, 35 minors, and eight pre-professional programs. Students can earn a bachelor of arts, bachelor of science, or bachelor of science in nursing. Wesleyan is affiliated with the United Methodist Church.

=== Rankings ===
In its 2026 edition, U.S. News & World Report ranked Wesleyan College fifth among 128 Regional Colleges South and ninth in the category "Top Performers on Social Mobility".

In 2024, Washington Monthly ranked Wesleyan College third among 223 colleges that award almost exclusively bachelor's degrees in the U.S. based on its contribution to the public good, as measured by social mobility, research, and promoting public service. In 2024, Washington Monthly ranked Wesleyan College first in the service rank for bachelor's college.

== Campus ==
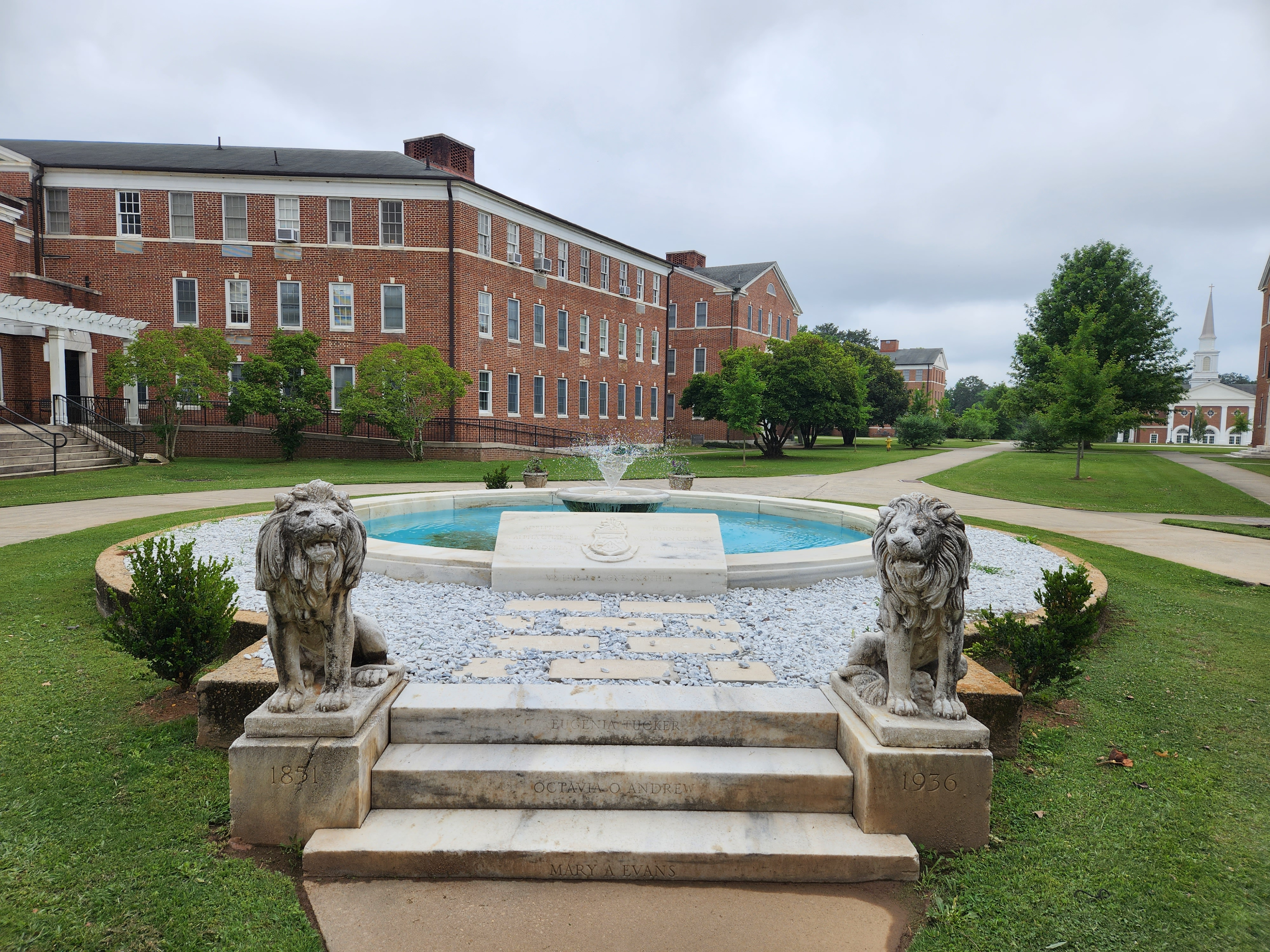
The college pictured in 2023

Wesleyan College has a 200-acre (800,000 m^{2}) campus dotted with revivalist Georgian style brick buildings and features a 6.3-acre (25,000 m^{2}) lake, Foster Lake.

Non-residential buildings on the (main) upper campus include:

- Candler Alumnae Center was built in 1946 and was presented to the College by the late Judge John Slaughter Candler of Atlanta in memory of his parents, Samuel and Martha Beall Candler. It was designed by renowned architect Phillip Shutze with the assistance of librarian Katharine Payne Carnes and originally housed the campus library. Candler Hall was renovated in 1971 as the Candler Alumnae Center and is currently home to the Office of Alumnae Affairs, the Office of Institutional Advancement, the Oval Hall ballroom, and the Benson Meeting Room.
- The Loggia is a two-level portico connecting the Olive Swann Porter Building with Persons Hall. The top-level balcony overlooks the courtyard between the residence halls and the campus fountain. It is revered for its exceptional architectural design and marble columns and staircase. The Loggia has been a symbol of Wesleyan College since its construction in 1928.
- The Lucy Lester Willet Memorial Library is a three-story Georgian-style brick building that was constructed in 1968 and is dedicated to the memory of Lucy Lester Willet, class of 1881. During the 2016-2017 school year, Willet Library underwent extensive renovations, opening a new 24-hour student academic center on the first floor of the building, complete with study carrels, computer labs, conference rooms, a testing center, the campus writing center, and a second-floor lounge with sitting areas, televisions, and vending machines. The library also houses the college's branch of the Confucius Institute.
- The Munroe Science Center houses the biology, chemistry, nursing, neuroscience, and environmental science departments. Built in 2006, the 42,000-square-foot building was made possible by the generosity of the Munroe sisters and their families. The Munroe Science Center boasts numerous teaching laboratories, two classrooms, modern research labs for faculty-student research, animal facilities, a rooftop greenhouse, an astronomy observation deck, and the Center for Women in Science and Technology. On the west wing of Munroe is the nursing wing which houses the nursing classroom and state of the art nursing simulation lab.
- The Olive Swann Porter Student Life Center (OSP) was built in 1928 in remembrance of the wife of James Hyde Porter, a long-time trustee of Wesleyan College. Furniture, antiques, and paintings from the college's extensive collection can be found throughout the building, most notably in the Burden Parlor and Manget Dining Room. Many offices of the Division of Student Affairs are housed in the Olive Swann Porter Building, including Health Services, the Center for Career Development, and the Office of the Dean of Students. OSP also contains the Anderson Dining Hall, Hurdle Café, Trice Conference Room, campus bookstore and post office, Lane Center for Service and Leadership, Belk Student Leadership Suites, and music practice rooms equipped with pianos. The Olive Swann Porter Building is connected to the Persons and Banks residence halls.
- The Porter Family Memorial Fine Arts Building was completed in 1954 and proudly houses the impressive Goodwyn-Candler-Panoz Organ, donated to the College by Asa G. Candler, Jr. of Coca-Cola fame, in its 1,129-seat auditorium. The Porter Family Memorial Fine Arts Building contains classrooms, offices, and studios for the College's music and theatre departments, as well as the east and west wings of the Cowles Myles Collier Art Gallery, and the Porter-Grassmann Studio Theatre used for student-produced plays and dance performances.
- Porter Gymnasium was built in 1928 and includes a heated swimming pool, a weight room, and a gymnasium floor marked for all indoor activities with bleacher seating for 700 spectators. Classrooms, dressing rooms, a dance studio, an athlete lounge, and shower baths are housed inside the building, as well.
- Tate Hall was one of the first academic buildings, along with Taylor Hall, on Wesleyan College's new Rivoli campus in 1928. It now contains classrooms and offices for the College's communications, women's studies, English, history, modern languages, religion, philosophy, and mathematics departments. The President's Office, Business Office, Registrar's Office, and other administrative offices are located on the first floor of Tate Hall.
- Taylor Hall was one of the first academic buildings, along with Tate Hall, on Wesleyan College's new Rivoli campus in 1928. Taylor Hall originally housed the school's science departments, but following renovations in 2009–2010, the building now houses laboratories and classrooms for education, physics, psychology, and business. The building also contains the 200-seat Peyton Anderson Amphitheatre on its ground floor.

Non-residential buildings on the lower campus include the following.

- Huckabee Hall houses the Office of Admissions.
- Pierce Chapel opened in 2015 and sits on a knoll overlooking Foster Lake. The chapel has a capacity of about 300 in the sanctuary, which is used primarily for worship services and occasionally as a venue for recitals, concerts, special events, and weddings. The Corn Center on the lower-level of the chapel provides meeting space for faith-based programs, campus groups, and the Chaplain's office.
- The Valeria McCullough Murphy Art Building was built in 1964 and contains 10,000 square feet of floor space designed exclusively for the teaching of the studio arts, art history, and computer graphic design. The building houses faculty offices for the College's visual arts department and is also the location of the Frances and Dennie McCrary Art Gallery used for faculty, student, and professional exhibitions.

== Student life ==
=== Student body ===
In 2024, the student body was 38% White, 38% Black, 11% Hispanic, 6% of two or more races, 5% international students, 1% Asian, and 1% of unknown classification.

=== Organizations ===
There are four major student boards: CRU (Council on Religious Unity), CJA (Council on Judicial Affairs), CAB (Campus Activities Board), SRC (Student Recreation Council), which are represented as a part of SGA (Student Government Association). Wesleyan boasts the Nu Omega chapter of Alpha Kappa Psi, the professional business fraternity. It also has over 25 special interest clubs, academic honor societies including the Phi Kappa Phi, Beta Beta Beta and Omicron Delta Epsilon; musical groups, art clubs, service organizations, religious groups, and departmental leadership groups. Sororities have been prohibited since 1917.

=== Events ===
There are several popular events of the International Cherry Blossom Festival every springtime, such as the grand finale fireworks display. Porter Auditorium was once the home of the Macon Symphony Orchestra, and it still hosts many musical and theatrical events and competitions.

=== Residence halls ===
- Banks Hall was built in 1928 and houses freshmen. It is connected to the Olive Swann Porter Building via a breezeway.
- Elizabeth Turner Corn Hall North and Ernest & Pauline Corn Hall South were opened in 1999. Each of these three-story buildings contains private furnished rooms (each with private bath) arranged in four-person suites and sharing a fully equipped kitchen, laundry facilities, and fully furnished living/dining room. There is also a small atrium on the lawn between the two buildings. Upperclassmen are housed in the apartments, and Elizabeth Turner Corn Hall exclusively houses seniors, as well as contains a deluxe "Alumnae Suite" for visitors to the campus.
- Hightower Hall was built in 1963 and houses upperclassmen. It contains a piano lounge in its foyer, as well as some of the most coveted rooms on the campus with its views of Foster Lake.
- Jones Hall was built in 1959 and contains the Wesleyan College Center for Community Engagement and Service, as well as a conference room and an overnight visitor's suite on the first floor. The second and third floors of the building house upperclassmen. Jones Hall's Mary Bennet Cox Dunwody Terrace, a popular event venue, is located behind the building and overlooks the azalea garden at the edge of Foster Lake.
- Persons Hall was built in 1928 and houses upperclassmen. The building is connected to the Wortham Residence Hall, as well as the Olive Swann Porter Building via the Loggia.
- Wortham Hall was built in 1928 and houses freshmen. Wortham Hall is connected to Persons Hall via a breezeway, as well as an overhead "bridge" between the two buildings.

== Athletics ==
Wesleyan Wolves wordmark

The Wesleyan athletic teams are called the Wolves. (formerly known as "Pioneers" until after 2012–13). The college is a member of the Division III ranks of the National Collegiate Athletic Association (NCAA). It competes in the Collegiate Conference of the South (CCS), formed in July 2022 by an amicable split of Wesleyan's former home of the USA South Athletic Conference. The Wolves had been USA South members from 2016–17 to 2021–22, and before that competed in the defunct Great South Athletic Conference (GSAC) from 2003–04 to 2015–16. Beginning in the 2026-27 academic year, Wesleyan will move from NCAA Division III to the NAIA.

Wesleyan competes in nine intercollegiate varsity sports, including basketball, cheerleading, cross country, dance, equestrian, soccer, softball, track, and volleyball. Wesleyan's equestrian team competes in the Intercollegiate Horse Shows Association and the Intercollegiate Dressage Association.

=== Facilities ===
In addition to Porter Gym on the main campus, other athletic facilities on the campus include:

- Mathews Athletic Center was donated to the College by Trustee George Mathews in memory of his sister, Mary Ann Mathews Pease '44 AND includes soccer and softball fields and tennis courts. The center provides weekly yoga, and other strength training classes, and more.
- Nancy Ellis Knox Equestrian Center is located north of Foster Lake and hosts the College's IHSA (Intercollegiate Horse Shows Association) and IDA (Intercollegiate Dressage) teams. The center includes two riding arenas, turnout paddocks, a 24-stall barn, and classroom. Instruction is also offered to the Macon community through the Community Horsemanship Program. The center's academic program is the Equine-Assisted Therapy minor.

=== Colors ===
The school colors include Pantone purple 268 C, dark purple 2627 C, and light purple 7678 C.

== Notable alumnae ==
- Mary Ross Banks, litterateur and author
- Catherine Brewer Benson, the first woman to earn a college degree at Wesleyan (1840)
- Kathryn Stripling Byer, poet and teacher; 2001 North Carolina Award in Literature and North Carolina Poet Laureate
- Rebecca Caudill, children's literature author
- Katherine Choy, ceramist
- Alice Culler Cobb (1843-1918), educator, missionary
- Phaedra Parks, lawyer and TV personality
- Toni Jennings, first female Lieutenant Governor of Florida
- Birdie Robertson Johnson, suffragist and clubwoman
- Ruth Austin Knox, lawyer and Wesleyan College's first alumna president
- Neva Jane Langley, Miss America (1953)
- Ellamae Ellis League, architect from Macon, first woman FAIA from Georgia
- Sara Branham Matthews, microbiologist
- Viola Ross Napier, one of the first two women to be elected into the House of Representatives in Georgia
- Hazel Jane Raines, the first woman in Georgia to receive a pilot's license (1936)
- Eugenia Rawls, stage actress
- Margaret Zattau Roan, music therapist, clubwoman
- Soong Ai-ling, Chinese businesswoman, wife of H. H. Kung
- Soong Ching-ling, Honorary Chairwoman of the People's Republic of China
- Soong Mei-ling, former First Lady of the Republic of China
- An-Ming Wang, composer
- Clare de Graffenried, labor researcher and writer

== See also ==
- Women's Colleges in the Southern United States
