= Mary Ross Banks =

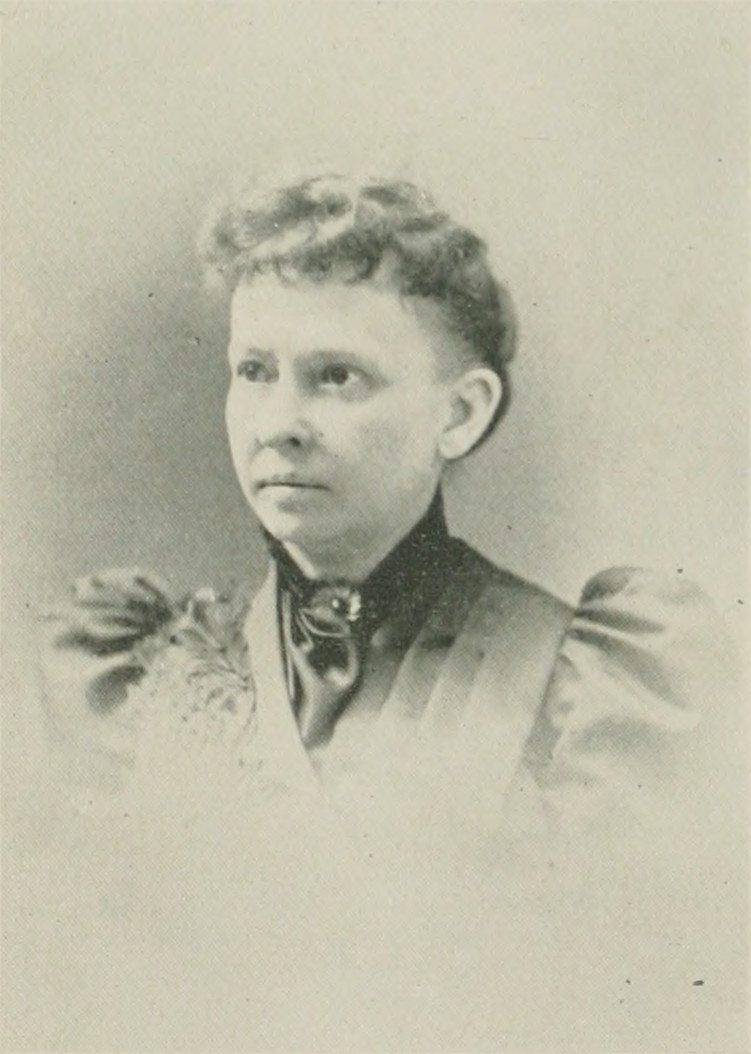
- "A Woman of the Century"
- Born: Mary Matthews Ross; March 4, 1846; Macon, Georgia, U.S.
- Died: September 15, 1910 (aged 64); Washington, D.C., U.S.
- Resting place: Griffin, Georgia, U.S.
- Education: Wesleyan Female College
- Occupations: litterateur; author
- Spouses: Edward Preston Bowdre (m. 1863; died 1874); John Truman Banks (m. 1875; died 1880)
- Children: 4 sons
- Writing career
- Genres: novels; sketches; short stories
- Notable work: Bright Days on the Old Plantation

Mary Ross Banks (née, Ross; after first marriage, Bowdre; after second marriage, Banks; March 4, 1846 – September 15, 1910) was an American writer of the long nineteenth century. Her literary fame came to her suddenly and was the result of one book, Bright Days on the Old Plantation (Boston, 1882).

== Early life and education ==
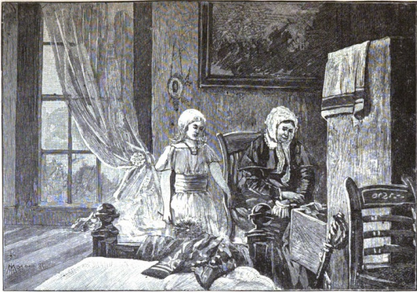
Mary Ross Banks and her grandmother at Holm Park, in Macon.

Mary Matthews Ross was born in Macon, Georgia, March 4, 1846. (Note: The birth date etched on her tombstone is Mar. 4, 1848.) On her father's side she was from Scotch ancestry. Her grandfather, Luke Ross (1775-1844), was a wealthy man for his day, and had a well-appointed home, the furniture of which was hauled in wagons from New York City to North Carolina. He moved to Jones County, Georgia, when Macon was a small trading port. Mrs. Banks' father, John Bennett Ross, was one of seven brothers and three sisters. The Ross brothers established themselves in trade about the year 1832, which resulted in commercial success. There were changes in the course of time, some of the brothers embarking in other kinds of business, but John B. Ross continued in the wholesale and retail dry goods and planters' supply business till he died and made so large a fortune that he was known as "the merchant prince of the South." His home was the center of entertainment, and his children were reared in luxury. Married three times, his second wife, Martha Redding, descended from the Lanes and Flewellens, and was Banks' mother. Banks had 11 siblings, included the sisters Flora and Violet, and a brother, William Henry Ross.

Banks was educated in Wesleyan Female College, in Macon, and in the private school of Mrs. Theodosia Bartow Ford.

== Career ==
In 1863, Banks married Edward Preston Bowdre (1839–1874) of Macon, at that time a captain in the Confederate States Army. She went to the army with her husband and served in the hospitals. At twenty-five years of age, she was a widow with three sons, including Jack Ross Bowdre and Julien Leon Bowdre, and much her family fortune had been lost due to the American Civil War.

In June 1875, she married Dr. John Truman Banks (1829–1880) of Griffin, Georgia, a gentleman of high standing, socially and professionally, and lived with him for four years until his death. Crushed by her grief, she went to work to help herself and her boys, though she had no training for business, and no knowledge of labor. She was a successful farmer and turned many of her talents and accomplishments into money-making. After raising her sons to the age of independence, she accepted a position in the Department of the Interior at Washington, D.C., where she was assigned to work in the office of the Secretary.

Banks' literary fame came to her suddenly and was the result of one book, Bright Days on the Old Plantation (Boston, 1882). It is a narrative of life on a broad plantation in Georgie during the Antebellum era days, founded on the experiences of the author. There were also a number of sketches and short stories published in various newspapers and periodicals.

Banks was a member of the Daughters of the American Revolution, and was named a delegate to its Continental Congress of April 1910, on behalf of the Mary Hammon Washington Chapter of Macon.

== Death ==
Banks died at Washington, D.C., September 15, 1910 at age 64, and was interned in Griffin, Georgia.

== Selected works ==
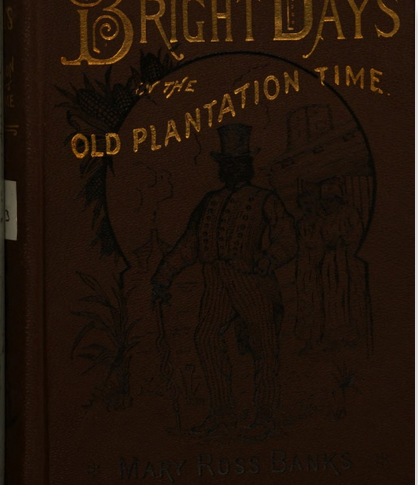
Bright days in the old plantation time

- Bright Days on the Old Plantation, 1882
