= William J. Sasnett =

First president of Auburn University (1820 – 1865)

Reverend William J. Sasnett
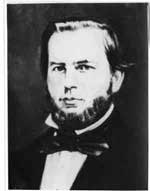
- Reverend William Sasnett in 1859

President of Auburn University
- In office 1858–1861
- Succeeded by: James Ferguson Dowdell

Personal details
- Born: April 29, 1820; Hancock County, Georgia, U.S.
- Died: November 3, 1865 (aged 45)

William Jacob Sasnett (April 29, 1820 – November 3, 1865) was an American educator and was the first President of East Alabama Mens College, now known as Auburn University, from 1858 to 1861.

== Biography ==
William J. Sasnett was a graduate of Oglethorpe University in Atlanta, Georgia. He served as a Methodist clergyman. He was a professor at Oxford College, now known as Emory University. He became the first President of East Alabama Mens College, now known as Auburn University, from 1858 to 1861.

== Bibliography ==
- Progress: Considered With Particular Reference to the Methodist Episcopal Church, South (1956)

Academic offices
Preceded by None	President of Auburn University; 1858–1861	Succeeded by James Ferguson Dowdell
