= James F. Dowdell =

American politician (1818–1871)

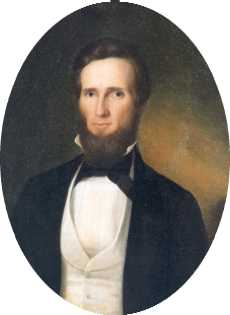

2nd President of East Alabama College
- In office 1868–1870
- Preceded by: William J. Sasnett
- Succeeded by: Isaac T. Tichenor

Member of the U.S. House of Representatives from Alabama
- In office March 4, 1853 – March 3, 1859
- Preceded by: Alexander White (7th); Sampson W. Harris (3rd)
- Succeeded by: Sampson W. Harris (7th); David Clopton (3rd)
- Constituency: 7th district (1853–55); 3rd district (1855–59)

Member of the Alabama House of Representatives
- In office 1849; 1851

Personal details
- Born: James Ferguson Dowdell; November 26, 1818 near Monticello, Georgia, U.S.
- Died: September 6, 1871 (aged 52) Auburn, Alabama, U.S.
- Party: Democratic
- Relatives: Elizabeth Caroline Dowdell (sister-in-law)
- Education: Randolph–Macon College

Military service
- Allegiance: Confederate States of America
- Branch/service: Confederate States Army
- Years of service: 1862–1865
- Rank: Colonel
- Commands: 37th Alabama Volunteer Infantry Regiment
- Battles/wars: American Civil War

James Ferguson Dowdell (November 26, 1818 – September 6, 1871) was the second President of the East Alabama College, now known as Auburn University, from 1868 to 1870, and a U.S. Representative from Alabama.

== Early life ==
James Ferguson Dowdell was born on November 26, 1818, near Monticello, Georgia. Dowdell completed preparatory studies and in 1840 and graduated from Randolph–Macon College, Ashland, Virginia. He studied law.

== Career ==
He was admitted to the bar in 1841 and commenced practice in Greenville, Georgia. He moved to Oak Bowery, Alabama, in 1846 and engaged in agricultural pursuits. He was an unsuccessful candidate for election to the State house of representatives in 1849 and 1851.

James Dowdell was elected as a Democrat to the Thirty-third, Thirty-fourth, and Thirty-fifth Congresses (March 4, 1853 – March 3, 1859). During the Civil War he served as colonel of the Thirty-seventh Regiment, Alabama Volunteer Infantry, under General Price from 1862 until the close of the war.

From 1868 to 1870, he served as the second President of the East Alabama College, now known as Auburn University.

== Death ==
He died on September 6, 1871 in Auburn, Alabama.

U.S. House of Representatives
Preceded by Alexander White	Member of the U.S. House of Representatives from Alabama's 7th congressional district March 4, 1853 – March 3, 1855	Succeeded by Sampson W. Harris
Preceded by Sampson W. Harris	Member of the U.S. House of Representatives from Alabama's 3rd congressional district March 4, 1855 – March 3, 1859	Succeeded by David Clopton
Academic offices
Preceded by William J. Sasnett	President of Auburn University; 1866–1872	Succeeded by Isaac T. Tichenor
