= Woman's Missionary Society of the Methodist Episcopal Church, South =

Woman's Missionary Society of the Methodist Episcopal Church, South (acronym WMS of the MEC,S; originally, General Executive Association of the Woman's Missionary Society) was an American women's organization whose scope included foreign and domestic Christian missionary outreach. Affiliated with the Methodist Episcopal Church, South, it was organized as the "General Executive Association of the Woman's Missionary Society" by General Conference at Atlanta, Georgia, May 1878. In 1882, it was renamed to the Woman's Board of Missions.

== Mrs. Lambuth's school in Shanghai ==
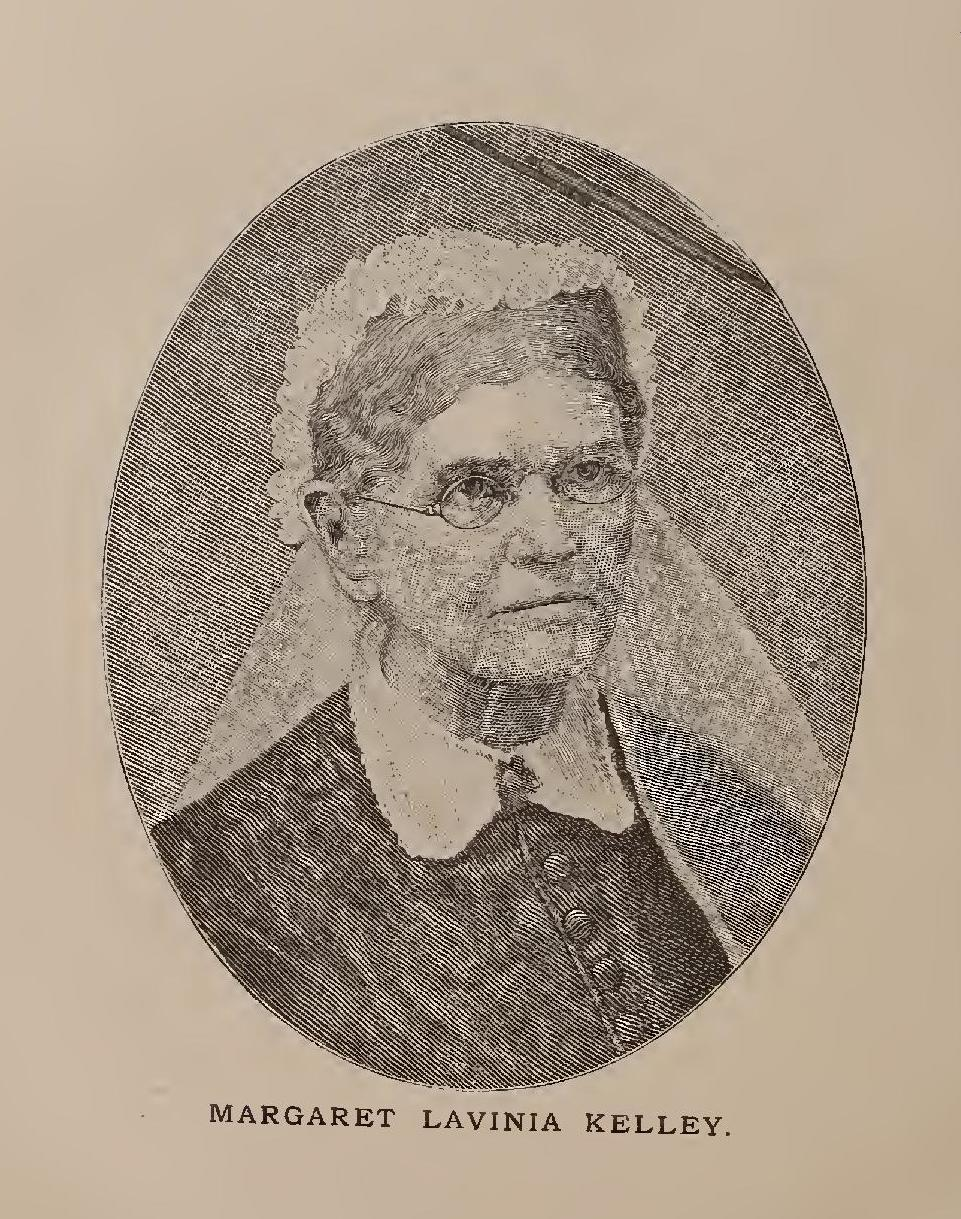
Margaret Lavinia Kelley

The earliest authentic record indicates that the first effort to organize and project in the South any form of missionary work for women was undertaken in 1858 by Mrs. Margaret Lavinia Kelley. She was the wife of an itinerant preacher, the Rev. John Kelley, at that time located at Bethlehem, Tennessee, Lebanon Circuit. The records show that a missionary society was organized and aid sent to Mary Isabella McClellan Lambuth for the maintenance of a school she was conducting in Shanghai, China.

Two years later, the American Civil War broke out, and this initial effort seemed lost in wartime.

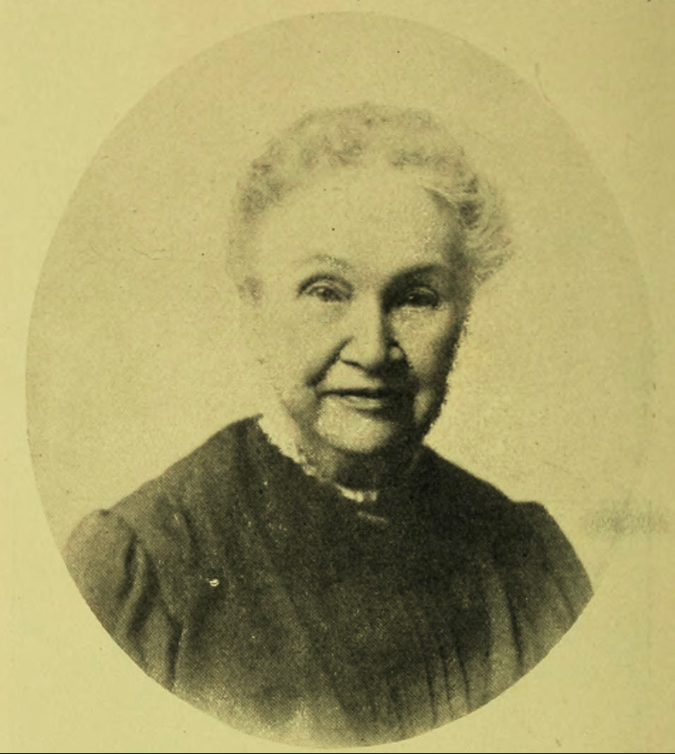
Elizabeth Caroline Dowdell (1910)

In 1861, when the activities of the women were directed to the making of provisions for the comfort of the Confederate Army soldiers just entering into the American Civil War, Elizabeth Caroline Dowdell, of Alabama, a devoted Christian woman with Southern sentiment and ideals, wrote a letter to Bishop James Osgood Andrew in which she said: "I asked myself, Is it true that we Southern women love our country and her cause better than we love our God and his cause? I would not believe it. And thus while I mused the fire burned, and I looked and beheld a sight that filled my heart with exultation and joy in the Holy Ghost. I saw vast numbers of Christian women of the South coming up to the help of the Lord, working systematically in the great missionary fields—not as they do now, slipping in a few miserable dollars, the remnant of the sacrifice offered to pride and vanity, but coming laden with gifts for the altar-gifts the first fruits of their self-denial and love."

The missionary zeal of Mrs. Kelley could not be quenched. Living in Nashville, Tennessee in 1872, she demonstrated a renewed effort seeking to make her vision of service a reality. According to her son, Rev. David Campbell Kelley, D.D:—

"In the fall of 1872, the work of canvassing had begun. A good deal of private effort had been made, and meetings had been called in the various churches of the city. The first meeting of the women was on a cold day in November 1873. Four women came together on that day, the result of much personal effort by Mrs. Kelley and repeated notices from the pulpit by the pastor of McKendree Church. They sat on the ends of the four pews nearest the register on the western side of old McKendree Church. As Mrs. Kelley sat with the list of names she had obtained, waiting, all seemed hopeless. The pastor, Dr. Kelley, entered the church and said: 'Organize your society just as if the house were filled.'"

The society took up the pastor's instructions, the same work in which the original society had been engaged: aid to Mrs. Lambuth's school in Shanghai.

== Fledgling start-ups ==
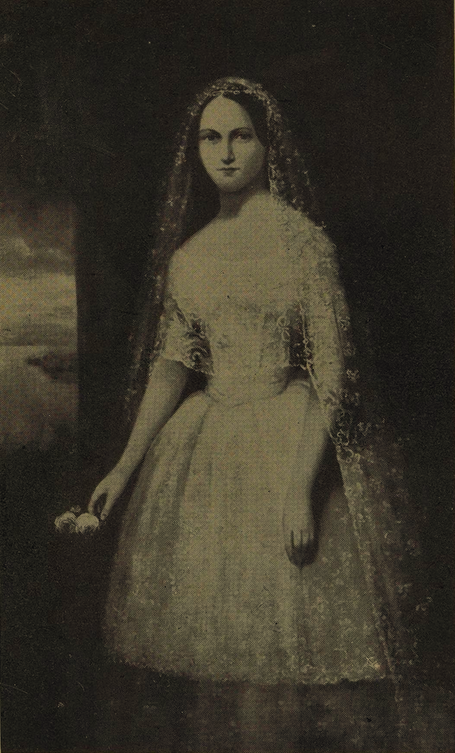
Willie Harding McGavock

In April 1874, largely through the efforts of Mrs. Kelley, some of the Methodist women of Nashville, formed themselves into an organization known as a "Bible Mission," with two distinct objects: one to furnish aid and Bible instruction to the poor and destitute of the city, the other to collect and contribute pecuniary aid to foreign missionary fields. The following officers were elected: Mrs. M. L. Kelley, President; Willie Elizabeth Harding McGavock (Mrs. D. H. McGavock), Corresponding Secretary; Miss Lucie Ross, Recording Secretary; and Mrs. T. D. Fite, Treasurer. A vice president and managers, one from each of the different Churches in the city, were also elected. The society had two distinct objects, namely, "To send pecuniary aid to the foreign mission fields and to employ efficiently the women at home in a systematic visitation and Bible instruction of the poor and destitute in their own midst." This new society thus kept in mind the local work and revived that which had been begun on the Lebanon Circuit-namely, the support of Mrs. Lambuth's work in China.

In 1875, Rev. and Mrs. Lambuth visited the U.S., and in their tour of the home Churches spoke in McKendree Church, Nashville. Mrs. McGavock was so stirred by their messages concerning the needs of China that under a strict pledge of secrecy, she was moved to give to Mrs. Lambuth the diamonds which had pinned her wedding veil. The funds from their sale purchased a new building for the school in Shanghai, which was called the Clopton School, thus honoring Mrs. McGavock's mother, whose maiden name was Clopton.

In three years, the Nashville society secured a home for the poor of the city, and founded the Mission Home" for "fallen women".

A few years prior to the organization of the Woman's Bible Mission of Nashville, Mrs. Juliana Hayes had begun work in Trinity Church, Baltimore, Maryland forming a society called the Trinity Home Mission. In 1873, however, having heard Mrs. Lambuth's call for aid in China, the society changed its name to the Woman's Bible Mission, which embraced in its efforts the work of foreign missions. Through the influence of Mrs. Hayes, this organization soon led to the forming of other societies in that vicinity. In April 1873, US$100 was sent to Mrs. Lambuth from seven auxiliaries of Baltimore. This fund was applied to the support of a Bible woman, the daughter-in-law of the Bible woman who had years before received support from the first auxiliary on the Lebanon Circuit.

Similar societies were about the same time or soon afterward organized at Warren, Arkansas, in the Broad Street Church in Richmond, Virginia, at Macon, Georgia, Glasgow, Missouri, Louisville, Kentucky, and Franklin, North Carolina. For some years before this, a society of women in New Orleans had been working for the Mexican Mission.

== Need for a connectional missionary society ==
Correspondence was carried on between the officers of the Baltimore and Nashville societies, and here and there throughout the Church missionary interest was stirred. The result was that there came into the mind of Mrs. McGavock the thought of the possibility of a connectional missionary society. She prepared a memorial to the General Conference in 1874 asking for authority to organize a woman's department of missions. The request was referred to the Committee on Missions and was never heard from again.

This failure increased the determination of the women to push forward in the work. Soon afterwards, their first leader, Mrs. Kelley died. Mrs. McGavock pushed forward this new phase of missionary work. She opened correspondence with all of the prominent ministers and members of the Church, both men and women, whose names and addresses she could obtain; and some who were prominent in other denominations were liberal contributors, supporting boys and girls in Mrs. Lambuth's school. But now the thought of sending a young woman to China to be supported by the women at home began to assume a shade of importance and a tone of probability.

A writer in the Christian Advocate asked this pertinent question: "What have we for Christian women to do?" A few weeks later Mrs. McGavock answered in the following words:—

"The Methodist Episcopal Church, South, seems to be waking up to the fact that women are both able and willing to render effective service in evangelizing the world. Almost every week, letters come from women in different States asking for information in reference to organizing societies, the best objects on which to expend funds already collected, and the channel through which such funds should be sent. The women of our beloved Church are aroused; united effort, concert of action is all that is lacking in the women of Southern Methodism. They are willing, generous, and vitally spiritual; but they stand aloof from this duty, each waiting for the other to lead, to suggest and adopt plans that will advance this movement. The heart-stirring letters from Bishop Marvin and Dr. Hendrix in the East have aroused the missionary pulse to healthy action. Herein will lie the secret of success. Every circuit and station should have an auxiliary society, and every woman and child should give something annually and send their contributions to a given center; then reports should be sent and published that all might know the amounts, sources, and the direction given to the funds."

In the year 1877, the first woman, in the person of Miss Lochie Rankin, offered herself for missionary service. This gave renewed enthusiasm and another tangible reason for pushing the woman's missionary cause before the General Conference, which was to meet the following year in Atlanta, Georgia.

== General Executive Association of the Woman's Missionary Society ==
At that meeting of the General Conference in Atlanta, Georgia, on May 14, 1878, Dr. D. C. Kelley, then the Assistant Secretary of the Board of Missions, in report No. 4 of the Committee on Missions, recommended that the women of the Church be authorized to organize missionary work under a constitution. The need of the field was so evident and the ability of the women to help meet it so apparent that, at last, the hold of conservatism were sufficiently loosened to make possible the unanimous adoption of the report. Then followed the organization of the General Executive Association of the Woman's Missionary Society.

On May 23, 1878, in the First Church in Atlanta a convention of women was held, and 54 names were enrolled as members. Rev. D. C. Kelley stated the object of the meeting and the ends proposed by the society: the sending of female missionaries and teachers to heathen lands to work for women and children.

The officers appointed by the bishops were Mrs. Juliana Hayes, President; Mrs. Robert Paine, Mrs. G. F. Pierce, Mrs. H. H. Kavanaugh, Mrs. W. M. Wightman, Mrs. E. M. Marvin, Mrs. D. S. Doggett, Mrs. H. N. McTyeire, and Mrs. J. C. Keener, Vice Presidents; Mrs. McGavock, Secretary; Mrs. James Whitworth, Treasurer. Twenty-three women living in different parts of the South were appointed as managers. With this official authority, Mrs. Hayes, Mrs. McGavock, and Mrs. Whitworth secured a charter and began organizing auxiliaries and Conference societies.

Before leaving Atlanta, however, Mrs. Juliana Hayes and Miss Melissa Baker, of Baltimore, at the invitation of Mrs. William Phillips, came to Marietta, Georgia and organized the Marietta auxiliary on June 3, 1878, this being the first auxiliary organized.

== First and second meetings of the General Executive Board ==
The first meeting of the General Executive Board of the Woman's Missionary Society was held in Broadway Church, Louisville, Kentucky, in May 1879. Fifteen conference societies had been organized, with 219 auxiliaries, numbering 5,890 members. The receipts for that first year were US$4,014.

Miss Lochie Rankin, of Shanghai, China, six Bible women, and the Clopton School had that year received support.

At the next annual meeting, in Nashville, Tennessee, delegates from 22 conference societies were present, representing 465 auxiliaries and 12,273 members. (Note: According to Haskin (1920), the Second Meeting recorded 475 auxiliaries and 12,548 members.) The collections for the second year were US$13,775.

Α second missionary was sent out in 1879, Miss Dora Rankin. She joined her sister the same year, and the two were together put in charge of a new school established at Nantziang, while the school at Shanghai was put in charge of Mrs. Lambuth. A generous woman of Baltimore purchased and donated a home for the missionaries in Nantziang-the "Louise Home".

Probably the most far-reaching plan made at this meeting was the decision to publish a missionary magazine to be called the Woman's Missionary Advocate. It was established at Nashville, with Mrs. F. A. Butler elected as editor.

== Renaming to Woman's Board of Missions ==
In 1882, by action of the General Conference, the name of the General Executive Association was changed to the Woman's Board of Missions.

Later, the word "foreign" was inserted.

== Progress ==
=== 1890-1910 ===
In 1890, the Board had property in China worth US$60,000; in Mexico, US$66,300; in Brazil, US$45,000; in Indian Territory, US$5,000; total, US$176,300. The collections of the Woman's Society for 1892-93 amounted to US$99,289.

By 1891, the society was composed of 34 conference societies. The corresponding secretary of each conference, together with five officers and six managers, constituted the Woman's Board, which was the executive body of the Society. The Home force consisted of: Auxiliary societies 1852, membership 38,203; young people's and children's societies 890, membership 27,263. Total receipts for year ending May 1890, US$75,486. Abroad, the force was represented (January 1891) by: Missionaries, 32, of whom 14 were in China; assistants, 27; native teachers, 27; boarding-schools, 10; day-schools, 24; pupils, 1,248; hospital, 1. The value of property held by the Board was US$181,000. Three years later, the society had 2209 auxiliaries with 76,396 members. There were flourishing missions and mission schools and hospitals in China, in South America, and in Mexico. In the field in China, there were 9 missionaries of the Woman's Board, 52 native teachers, 5 Bible women, 4 boardings chools, 33 day-schools, 758 pupils, and I hospital and dispensary.

In 1895, the annual meeting was held in Meridian, Mississippi, and neither the president nor the corresponding secretary was able to be present. The Board's president died in less than one month after this meeting. The health of the Corresponding Secretary, Mrs. McGavock, was precarious. Late in September 1895, she called a meeting of the local Board to be held in her own chamber where she signed papers giving the power of attorney to the Secretary of Home Affairs, Mrs. S. C. Trueheart, saying: 'This is my last official act."

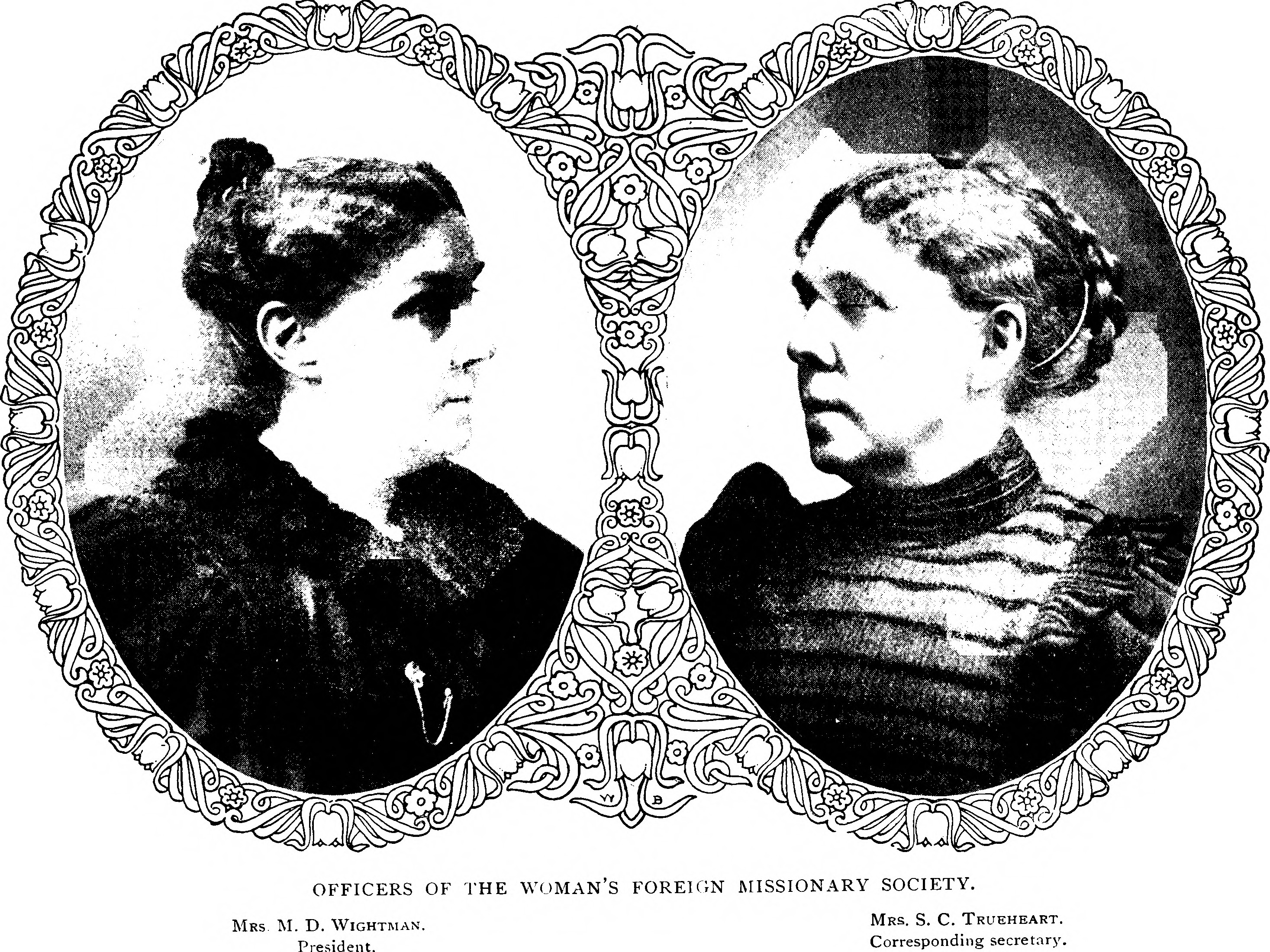
Mrs. M. D. Wightman & Mrs. S. C. Truehart (l-r)

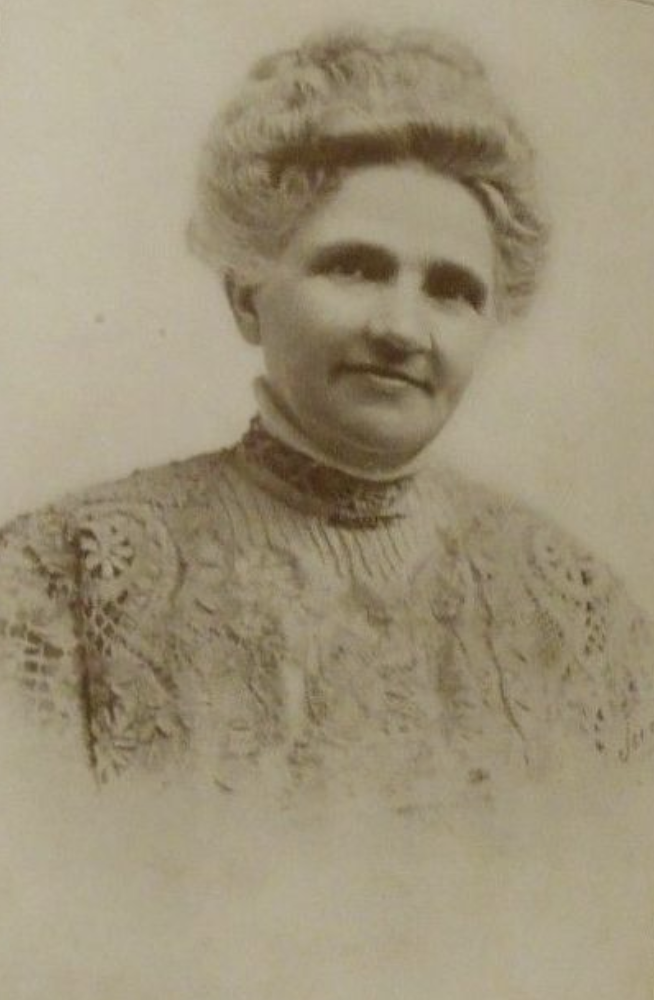
Alice Culler Cobb

Mrs. Truehart was elected to fill the place of corresponding secretary. She had already served with Mrs. McGavock as promoter of the home base, so was eminently fitted to carry on the work. Mrs. Wightman was elected to the presidency of the Woman's Board of Foreign Missions. She served until 1906, at which time she resigned on account of failing health. Miss M. L. Gibson, who had been serving for a number of years as vice president, was elected to the presidency upon the retirement of Mrs. Wightman. In this capacity she continued to serve until the union of the boards in 1910. In 1910, after being elected general secretary of the Woman's Board, Alice Culler Cobb moved to Nashville.

=== Work in China ===
China was the first field entered, in 1878. Miss Lochie Rankin, of Tennessee, the first representative of the newly formed society, was sent to take charge of a school in Shanghai. This school was already in existence under the General Board, with an attendance of 29 pupils and 6 native Bible women.

After Shanghai, the following stations were occupied in the order given: Nantziang, Soochow, and Kahding. Boarding-schools were carried on in all of these cities. There were nine church-members in the Clopton School, Shanghai. The teacher at Soochow reported that her school had read the entire New Testament during one year; and 14 out of a school of 21 were probationers.

At Soochow, Dr. Mildred Philips had charge of a woman's hospital, whose whole cost of building, site, and equipment was US$10,000. It comprised a two-storied home for the medical missionary and others, a dispensary, two wards, and an operating ward, with cheap buildings for servants and kitchen. The hospital was opened in October 1888.

Several schools in the mission were Anglo-Chinese, and two women at Shanghai gave their entire time to teaching in the Anglo-Chinese Chi College for young men.

Work at Kahding was opened by a woman of ten years' experience in China, who went, with Chinese assistants only, to make a beginning in that large, walled city. At the end of a year, she had six day-schools with 76 pupils, with five Chinese teachers and a Bible-woman at work.

=== Work in Brazil ===
The Society entered Brazil in 1880, and occupied stations at Piracicaba and Rio de Janeiro. They had boarding-schools at both places, with about 100 girls in the former, although only 20 were house-pupils. The latter school received children from two to thirteen years old. A school for young boys in Rio was also under care of this society. The language of all the Brazilian schools was Portuguese.

In the Brazilian work, in 1894, there were 9 missionaries, 14 teachers, four of whom are native, 3 schools, and 240 pupils. The points occupied were Piracicaba, in the São Paulo Province, and Rio and Juiz de Fora, in the state of Minas Gerais.

=== Work in Mexico ===
In 1881, the Society entered Mexico, where it had stations at Nuevo Laredo and Saltillo. The girls' school in the former place enrolled 144, and a boys' school of 39 was self-supporting. The Laredo Band was a missionary society in the church, which contributed from US$40 to US$60 in a year. The school for girls at Saltillo closed its first year in December 1888, having received $282.15 (Mexican) for tuition, which, aside from the missionary's salary, was sufficient to cover expenses. Instruction was given at both stations in day-schools and Sunday schools.

The work of the Woman's Board in Mexico extended to a greater number of points in 1894. In the Laredo District, there were 5 missionaries, 11 teachers, 4 native teachers, 531 pupils. At Saltillo there were 3 missionaries, 5 teachers, 181 pupils. In Durango], 1 missionary, 3 teachers, 80 pupils. In Chihuahua, 3 missionaries, 3 teachers, 109 pupils. In the San Luis Potosi, 1 missionary, 7 teachers, 158 pupils. In the Mexican work altogether, there are 13 missionaries, 32 teachers, ten of whom are natives, and 1,171 pupils.

=== Work in the United States ===
Harrell International Institute, in the Osage Nation, Indian Territory (now Osage County, Oklahoma), was also under care of this Society.

The Woman's Board had and supported a school at Anadarko, in the Indian Territory, which has 4 teachers and 54 pupils.

== Publications ==
The Woman's Missionary Advocate was published monthly at Nashville, Tennessee. It was self-supporting, with a circulation of more than 11,000; price, US$.50. Mrs. F. A. Butler served as editor-in-chief from the beginning until the home and foreign societies were merged.

The Society also in 1889 printed and distributed without charge 1,500,000 pages of leaflets.
