= Alpha Delta Pi =

North American collegiate sorority

- ΑΔΠ
- Founded: May 15, 1851; 175 years ago Wesleyan College (Macon, Georgia)
- Type: Social
- Affiliation: NPC
- Status: Active
- Scope: International
- Motto: "We Live For Each Other"
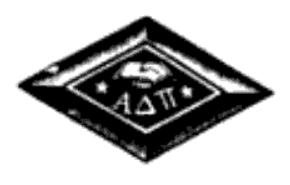
- Member badge
- Colors: Azure and White
- Flower: Woodland Violet
- Jewel: Diamond
- Mascot: Alphie the Lion
- Publication: The Adelphean
- Philanthropy: Ronald McDonald House Charities
- Chapters: 161
- Members: 260,000+ lifetime
- Headquarters: 1386 Ponce de Leon Ave., NE; Atlanta, Georgia 30306; United States
- Website: www.alphadeltapi.org

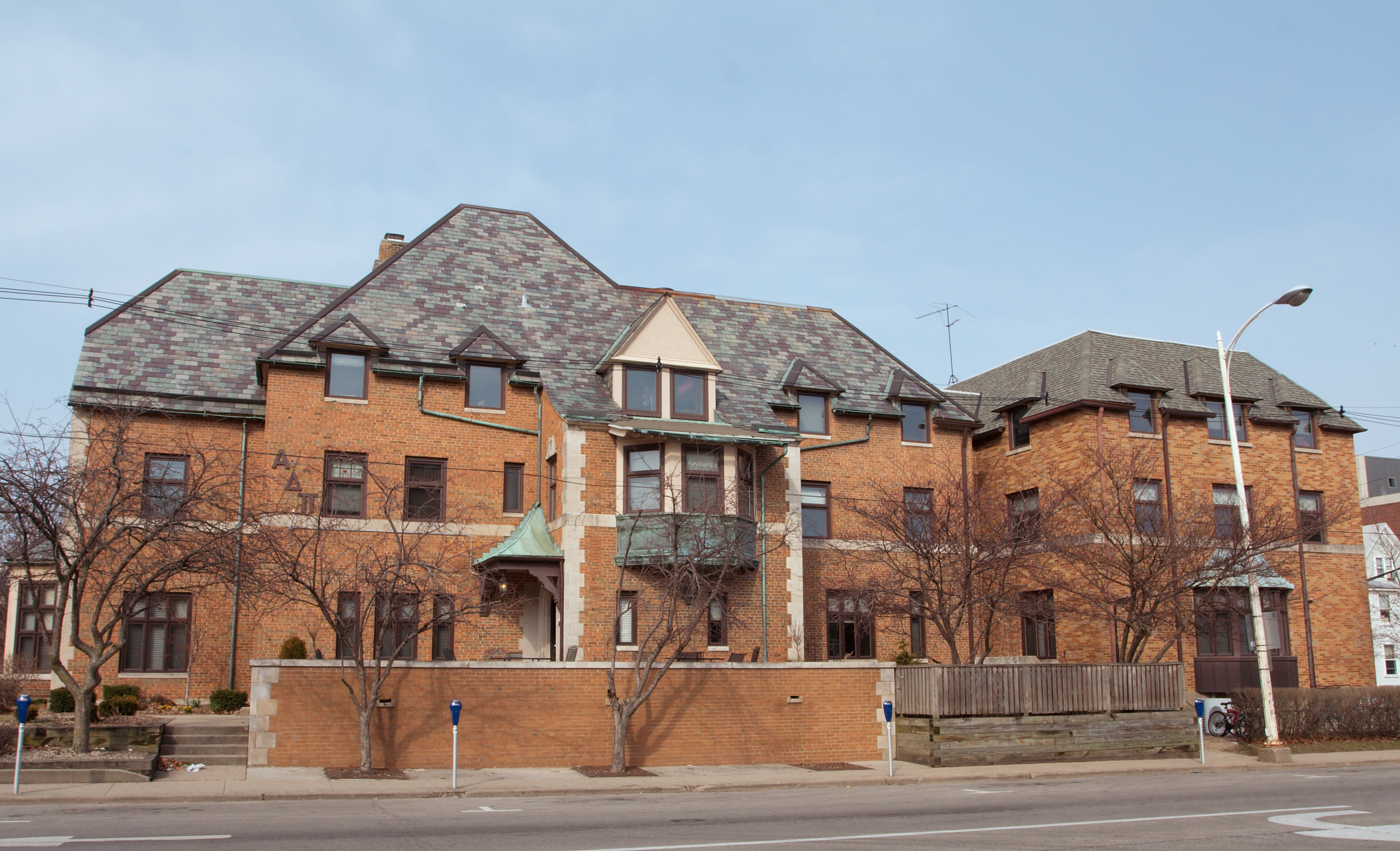
University of Illinois chapter house, listed in the NRHP

Alpha Delta Pi (ΑΔΠ), commonly known as ADPi (pronounced "ay-dee-pye"), is an International Panhellenic sorority founded on May 15, 1851, at Wesleyan College in Macon, Georgia. It is the oldest secret society for women.

Alpha Delta Pi is a member of the National Panhellenic Conference. The sorority's national philanthropic partner is the Ronald McDonald House Charities. Its executive office is located in Atlanta, Georgia.

== History ==
Alpha Delta Pi was first founded as the Adelphean Society on May 15, 1851, at Wesleyan Female College in Macon, Georgia. The six founders included Eugenia Tucker Fitzgerald, Elizabeth Williams Mitchell, Sophronia Woodruff Dews, Octavia Andrew Rush, Mary Evans Glass, and Ella Pierce Turner.

In 1904, a committee of three, led by Jewel Davis, contacted Attorney Dupont Guerry, the college's president, about to the procedure to become a national organization. They secured a charter of incorporation from the state of Georgia. In 1905, the Adelphean Society changed its name to Alpha Delta Phi. At the time of nationalization, Alpha Delta Phi, as a women's fraternity, had sixty active members and 3,000 alumnae.

In 1905, the Beta chapter was established at Salem College in Winston-Salem, North Carolina, by two members of the Alpha chapter. The chapter had seven members and fifteen new initiates until the administration abolished sororities three years later. In 1906 its Gamma chapter was founded at Mary Baldwin Seminary. Visitors were not allowed at the school, so the chapter charter and special instructions were delivered to the new group by mail.

In 1906, Jewel Davis entered the University of Texas at Austin as a graduate student, organized a group, and installed them as Delta chapter, the fourth chapter of Alpha Delta Phi. Jewel Davis is listed as a charter member as there was no precedent for affiliation. Today, the Delta chapter at The University of Texas at Austin is the oldest surviving chapter of Alpha Delta Pi. Between 1906 and 1912, eight more chapters were founded at various universities.

In 1913, Alpha Delta Phi officially changed its name to Alpha Delta Pi. The deliberations over this change remain largely unknown aside from the impetus of the discovery of a pre-existing men's fraternity using those exact letters and which pre-dated the original Adelphean Society's inception by almost 20 years. There seems to be little to no speculation as to why "Pi" was specifically chosen as a replacement letter, and or why it took so long to hear of the pre-existing Alpha Delta Phi fraternity. Thus in 1913, the Adelphean Society, through Convention legislation, changed the name of the organization, adopted a recognition pin, and appointed a standardization committee. The trustees at Wesleyan Female College voted to abolish sororities, leading to the closure of Alpha chapter in 1915. Chi chapter, at Wittenberg University, was the first chapter to bear the new name at installation. In 1948, Mrs. Carolee Strock Stanard retired as Grand President and part of her keynote address became The Creed of Alpha Delta Pi. In 1960, Alpha Delta Pi's 100th chapter, Delta Omicron, was installed at East Carolina University.

In 1979, Alpha Delta Pi adopted Ronald McDonald Houses as the National Philanthropy. In 1983, Alpha Delta Pi Foundation was established. In 2001, Alpha Delta Pi celebrated its 150th anniversary in Atlanta, Georgia, and in 2006, the Delta chapter, the oldest open chapter of ADPi, celebrated its 100th anniversary at The University of Texas at Austin. In 2009, Theta Theta chapter at Quinnipiac University was the 200th chapter of ADPi to be installed. Chapters continue to be installed and anniversaries are celebrated at numerous university campuses.

== Symbols and publications ==
The open motto of ADPi is "We Live for Each Other,". The sorority's colors are azure blue and white. To the sorority, blue is symbolic of friendship, which the sorority cites as one of its founding values; white symbolizes sincerity and truth, which are two qualities the sorority states it looks for in its members. The official flower is the woodland violet; however since woodland violets are found in the wild and not available for purchase, people often substitute the African violet. The official jewel and symbol is the diamond, which the sorority uses as a symbol of "the enduring strength and value of friendship". The mascot for Alpha Delta Pi is a lion with the nickname of Alphie.

The Adelphean is the sorority's quarterly magazine. Its first issue was published March 12, 1907.

=== Badge ===
The first diamond-shaped badge, also known as a lozenge, was first worn by the Adelpheans in 1851. Stars were not included on this first badge, but it did have a monogram of the Wesleyan pin attached to the badge by a link chain, thus forming a guard. In 1854, the stars were added, but it was not until 1874 that the stars and the clasped hands were raised. This design remained with only slight modifications until 1906 when, at Alpha Delta Pi's first convention, Nanaline King presented a new design for the pin. Her design was a smaller gold badge with a black enamel center which pictured the clasped hands, the two stars, and the Greek letters, Alpha Delta Phi. This design was adopted by the convention and is still in use today, except for the Greek letter Phi being changed to Pi at the 1913 convention.

The new member badge is a gold pin emblazoned with a lion atop the Greek letters ΒΥΑ.

=== Coat of Arms ===
Elizabeth Moseley Coles, who was elected national president at the first grand convention, was responsible for having Alpha Delta Pi's coat of arms designed. Another sister of the Alpha chapter, Agnes Chapman, is given credit for the actual design of the coat of arms. Symbolism from the ritual and the Alpha pin were combined in the coat of arms, and the design originally had a background of violets. In 1919, the convention body voted to make changes and the present design was accepted.

== Philanthropy ==
Since 1979, Alpha Delta Pi has been committed to serving Ronald McDonald House Charities (RMHC). Throughout their partnership, Alpha Delta Pi has contributed more than $16 million to RHMC. Local RMHC Chapters operate Ronald McDonald House, Ronald McDonald Care Mobile, and Ronald McDonald Family Room programs in local communities.

== Chapters ==
Alpha Delta Pi currently has 161 chapters in the United States and Canada, with the majority concentrated in the southern United States, and over 150 alumnae associations.

== See also ==
- List of social sororities and women's fraternities
