= Goldthwaite (surname) =

Goldthwaite is a surname. Notable people with the surname include:

- Alfred Goldthwaite (1921–1997), American politician
- Anne Goldthwaite (1869–1944), American painter
- George Goldthwaite (1809–1879), American politician
- Nellie Esther Goldthwaite (1868–1946), American food chemist
- Henry Goldthwaite (1802–1847), American jurist
- Kevin Goldthwaite (born 1982), American soccer player

== See also ==
- Goldthwait
- Justice Goldthwaite (disambiguation)
