= Carlos A. Moon =

American painter (1906–1953)

Carlos Alpha Moon
- Born: 1906; Birmingham, Alabama, U.S.
- Died: 1953 (aged 46–47); Florala, Alabama, U.S.
- Resting place: Greenwood Cemetery, Florala, U.S.
- Education: Andalusia High School; Auburn University
- Occupation: Painter
- Spouse: Sadie Pouncey
- Children: 1 daughter

Carlos A. Moon, also known as Shiney Moon, (1906–1953) was an American painter from the state of Alabama. He was a member of the Dixie Art Colony and the Bayou Art Colony. Initially an oil painter, he became "one of Dixie's most widely known water color artists."

== Early life ==
Moon was born in 1906 in Birmingham, Alabama. He grew up in Andalusia, Alabama, where he graduated from Andalusia High School in 1925. He attended Auburn University, then known as the Alabama Polytechnic Institute, in 1927–1928.

== Career ==
Moon took up painting in 1942. He was invited to join the Dixie Art Colony by its founder John Kelly Fitzpatrick in 1944 as an oil painter. He first exhibited his work at the Montgomery Museum of Fine Arts in 1946, and he became a watercolorist shortly after.

With Fitzpatrick and Genevieve Southerland, Moon co-founded the Bayou Art Colony in Bayou La Batre, Alabama, where he taught watercolor painting. He also taught painting in Brewton, Geneva and Andalusia. Moon became the president of the Watercolor Society of Alabama and the vice president of the Alabama Art League. He was described as "one of Dixie's most widely known water color artists" by the Andalusia Star-News.

His artwork was initially realist, and it later became more abstract, depicting "a more dynamic world with simplified forms, sharp angles, or swirls in stronger, contrasting colors, especially primarily hues."

== Personal life and death ==
Moon married Sadie Pouncey; they had a daughter, and they resided in Florala, Alabama. Moon died in 1953, at age 47, and he was buried in Greenwood Cemetery in Florala.
