= John Kelly Fitzpatrick =

American painter (1888–1953)

- Born: 1888; Wetumpka, Alabama, U.S.
- Died: April 18, 1953 (aged 64–65); Wetumpka, Alabama, U.S.
- Resting place: Wetumpka City Cemetery
- Occupation: Painter
- Relatives: Benjamin Fitzpatrick (paternal grandfather)

John Kelly Fitzpatrick (1888–1953) was a regionalist American painter from Alabama.

== Biography ==
=== Early life ===
John Kelly Fitzpatrick was born in 1888 in Wetumpka, Alabama. His father, Phillips Fitzpatrick (1830–1901), was a physician, and his mother was Jane Lovedy Kelly (1850–1913). His paternal grandfather, Benjamin Fitzpatrick (1802–1869), served as the governor of Alabama from 1841 to 1845.

He attended the Stark University School in Montgomery and went to the University of Alabama to study journalism for two years, until he dropped out. He then spent a semester at the Art Institute of Chicago in Chicago, Illinois, but dropped out again. In 1918, he joined the United States Army and served in France during the First World War. In 1929, he spent a few months at the Académie Julian in Paris, France. In other words, his formal education was fairly limited, as he never managed to receive a degree from an institution of higher education.

=== Career ===
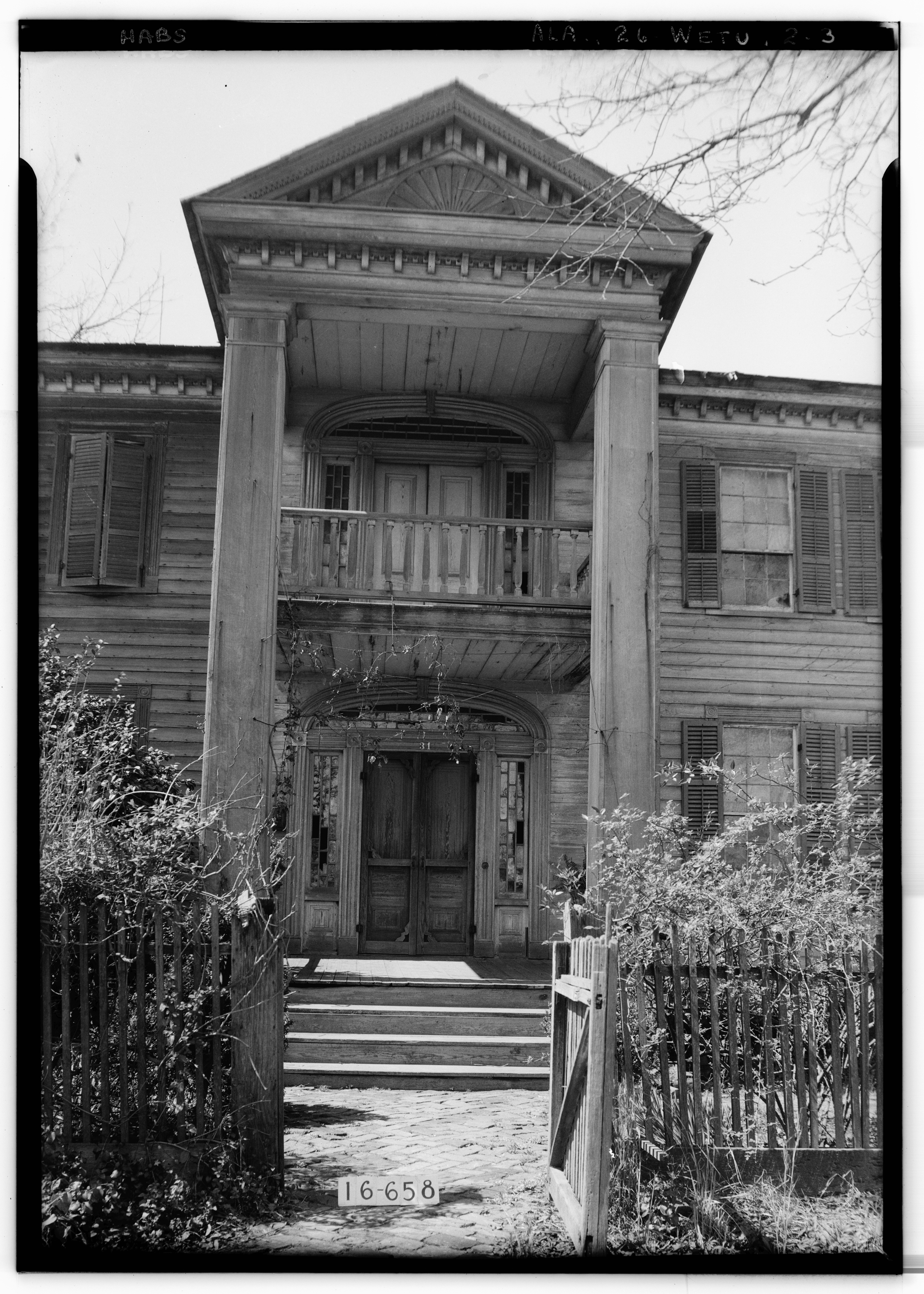
Kelly Fitzpatrick House, Autaga Street Wetumpka

As a regionalist painter, Fitzpatrick is best known for his paintings of rural Alabama, especially his home county of Elmore County, Alabama. He was inspired by French painters like Paul Cézanne (1839–1906), Vincent van Gogh (1853–1890), and Henri Matisse (1869–1954). In the French tradition, he often painted out in the open, near lakes or creeks in the Alabama countryside.

Together with a group of artists known as the Morningview Painters, Fitzpatrick founded the Alabama Art League in the late 1920s. This led to the establishment of the Montgomery Museum of Fine Arts in Montgomery, Alabama in 1930. He sat on its original Board of Trustees and helped develop its permanent collection. Some of his work is still exhibited there. He also taught painting and served as director of the Montgomery Museum Art School. In 1938 and 1939, he was commissioned by the federal government as part of the Public Works of Art Project to produce paintings, including murals inside the newly constructed post offices in the towns of Ozark, Alabama titled Early Industry of Dale County and in Phenix City, Alabama titled Cotton.

In 1933, Fitzpatrick co-founded the Dixie Art Colony with Sallie B. Carmichael and her daughter Warree Carmichael LeBron. The idea was to establish an artist colony to paint and train burgeoning artists in the South. From 1937, they met at Poka Hutchi ("gathering of picture writers" in Creek Indian parlance), a small cabin on Lake Jordan. Later, Frank W. Applebee, the Chair of the School of Art and Architecture at Auburn University and a painter, joined the colony, as did Genevieve Southerland, Anne Wilson Goldthwaite and Lamar Dodd (1909-1996). The colony last met in 1948.

The John Kelly Fitzpatrick Gallery is in the City Administration Building in Wetumpka, Alabama. Additionally, some of his paintings can be found in the Montgomery Museum of Fine Arts and the Alabama Department of Archives and History in Montgomery as well as the Johnson Collection in Spartanburg, South Carolina and the Ogden Museum of Southern Art in New Orleans, Louisiana.

=== Death ===
He died of a heart attack on April 18, 1953. He was buried in the Wetumpka City Cemetery.

== Selected paintings ==
- The Sugar Cane Mill (Montgomery, Alabama: Montgomery Museum of Fine Arts, 1933).
- Monday Morning (Montgomery, Alabama: Montgomery Museum of Fine Arts, 1934).
- Oat Fields (Spartanburg, South Carolina: The Johnson Collection, 1936).
- Jug Factory (Spartanburg, South Carolina: The Johnson Collection, 1937).
- Mules to Market (New Orleans, Louisiana: Ogden Museum of Southern Art, 1937).
- Harvest (Spartanburg, South Carolina: The Johnson Collection, 1941).
- Creek Indian Corn Dance (Montgomery, Alabama: Alabama Department of Archives and History, 1945).
- Hillbilly Barn Dance (Montgomery, Alabama: Alabama Department of Archives and History, 1945).
- Minuet (Montgomery, Alabama: Alabama Department of Archives and History, 1947).
- Swinging on the Grapevine (Montgomery, Alabama: Alabama Department of Archives and History, 1948).

== Secondary sources ==
- John Kelly Fitzpatrick: Retrospective Exhibition (Montgomery, Alabama: Montgomery Museum of Fine Arts, 1970).
- A Symphony of Color: The World of Kelly Fitzpatrick (Montgomery: Montgomery Museum of Fine Arts, 1991).
- Dixie Art Colony Foundation (Wetumpka: Dixie Art Colony Foundation, 2017).
