= George W. Stone =

American judge (1811–1894)

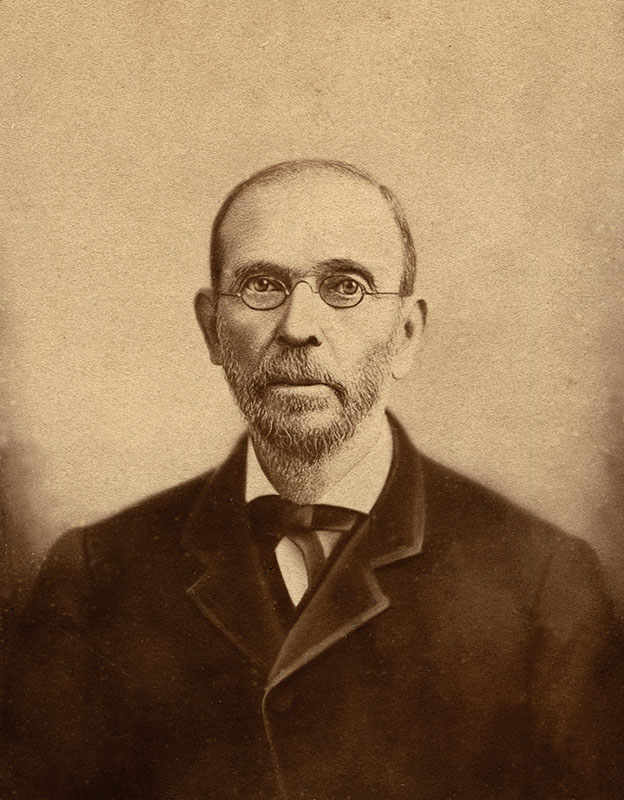

15th Chief Justice of the Supreme Court of Alabama
- In office 1884–1894
- Preceded by: Robert C. Brickell
- Succeeded by: Robert C. Brickell

Associate Justice of the Alabama Supreme Court
- In office 1856–1865
- Preceded by: George Goldthwaite
- Succeeded by: William M. Byrd
- In office 1876–1884
- Preceded by: Thomas J. Judge
- Succeeded by: David Clopton

Personal details
- Born: George Washington Stone; October 24, 1811 Bedford County, Virginia
- Died: March 11, 1894 (aged 82) Montgomery, Alabama
- Party: Democratic
- Profession: Lawyer, judge

George Washington Stone (October 24, 1811 – March 11, 1894) was an American jurist who served as an associate justice of the Supreme Court of Alabama from 1856 to 1864, and then again from 1876 to 1884; and was then Chief Justice of that court from 1884 to 1894.

== Early life and education ==
Stone was born in Bedford County, Virginia, on October 24, 1811, to Micajah and Sarah Leftwich Stone. The family moved to Lincoln County, Tennessee, on the border with Alabama, in 1818, where George attended the local schools. His father, a well-to-do planter, died in 1827; George, after briefly participating in mercantile activities, began studying law in the office of a Fayetteville, Tennessee, lawyer. He never attended college. Stone received his license to practice law in 1834, and he wed Mary Gillespie that same year.

== Legal career ==
Stone moved to Coosa County, Alabama, where he taught school for several months before beginning to practice law at Sylacauga in Talladega County. He went to Talladega in 1840 and practiced law with William P. Chilton, who later became Chief Justice of the Supreme Court of Alabama. In 1843, Stone unsuccessfully sought the position of circuit judge; after the judge who had defeated him died, he was appointed to fill the vacancy. The legislature elected him to a full six-year term that December, and he served until his resignation in 1849, at which time he took up the practice of law in Hayneville. In 1856, the legislature voted 61–59 on the twenty-third ballot to make Stone an associate justice of the Supreme Court of Alabama; it had to make an exception to a state anti-dueling law in order for him to be eligible to serve.

Stone was a justice of the Supreme Court of Alabama from 1856 until 1865 and from 1876 until 1894; after 1884, he served as chief justice. During his tenure, he penned more than 2,400 opinions. In Ex parte Hill, in re Willis v. Confederate States (1863), he voted to uphold a conscription law passed by the Confederate Congress; according to the historian Timothy S. Huebner, his "long and confusing" opinion "attempted to reconcile his simultaneous devotion to both state sovereignty and the Confederate war effort". Citing cases such as Martin v. Hunter's Lessee (1816) and Sturges v. Crowninshield (1819)—pro-federal-government Marshall-Court decisions that Southerners had long hated—Stone demonstrated support for a strong central Confederate government, although the opinion also contained language sympathetic to states' rights.

Stone's pro-Confederate attitudes led to his removal from the bench once Reconstruction began, but his reputation as a lawyer remained unblemished even among Unionists; in 1865, the legislature tasked him with drafting a new criminal code for the state. Conservative Democratic Redeemers took control of Alabama's legislature and governorship in 1874, and in 1876 Stone was again appointed to the state Supreme Court. According to Huebner, he spent the following years "cooperat[ing] with other white Alabamians in attempting to suppress black civil rights". He upheld local officials' attempts to seat all-white grand juries in Green v. State (1882), and he ruled in several cases that the state's anti-miscegenation law was not at odds with the Fourteenth Amendment. His opinions in personal-injury cases involving railroads helped to define proximate cause, contributory negligence, and other such doctrines. Stone's most influential contributions were in the field of criminal law, where he sought to stem the tide of violence in the South. He held in McManus v. State (1860) that individuals could not claim self-defense when they had an opportunity to withdraw (the duty to retreat), rebuking those who sought to settle disputes by resorting to "notions of chivalry or personal prowess". In other cases, he attempted to limit the permissibility of concealed weapons and to make it more difficult for defendants to assert the insanity defense.

== Death and legacy ==
Stone died on March 11, 1894, at his home in Montgomery of heart failure resulting from old age. The Birmingham Age-Herald stated that "he impressed himself on the judicial jurisprudence of the State as no other Justice has. Of the fifteen Chief Justices he stands pre-eminent." In 1954, he was made a member of the Alabama Hall of Fame.

Political offices
Preceded by George Goldthwaite; Thomas J. Judge	Associate Justice of the Supreme Court of Alabama; 1856–1864; 1876–1884	Succeeded by William M. Byrd; David Clopton
Preceded by Robert C. Brickell	Chief Justice of the Supreme Court of Alabama; 1884–1894	Succeeded by Robert C. Brickell
