= Abram Joseph Walker =

American judge

A. J. Walker (November 24, 1819 – April 25, 1872) was an American judge from Alabama was elected to the Alabama Supreme Court in 1855.

A graduate of Nashville University, Walker moved to Alabama in 1841 as a professor and taught mathematics, Latin and Greek.

In 1856, Walker requested Congressman Sampson Willis Harris secure an appointment for John Pelham to the United States Military Academy.

After the American Civil War, the Alabama legislature convened and elected Walker as chief justice of the state supreme court, along with associate justices Thomas J. Judge and William M. Byrd, effective January 1, 1866.

Legal offices
Preceded by Samuel F. Rice	Chief Justice of the Supreme Court of Alabama	Succeeded by E. Wolsey Peck
