= Justice Goldthwaite =

Justice Goldthwaite may refer to:

- George Goldthwaite (1809–1879), chief justice of the Supreme Court of Alabama
- Henry Goldthwaite (1802–1847), associate justice of the Supreme Court of Alabama
