= Thomas J. Judge =

American judge (1845–1876)

Thomas James Judge (November 1, 1815 – March 3, 1876) was an Alabama lawyer and politician who served as justice of the Supreme Court of Alabama from 1866 to 1867 and from 1874 until his death in 1876.

== Early life and military service ==
Born in Richland, South Carolina, Judge's family moved to Alabama during his childhood.

In the 1850s, Judge was in a law partnership with George W. Stone. After working as a newspaper editor in Greenville, Alabama, he was elected to the Alabama House of Representatives, and was described as leading an "extreme southern rights faction". In June 1850, Judge was among several delegates chosen by the Alabama legislature "to discuss measures to secure redress of grievances" stemming from dissatisfaction with the Compromise of 1850. As Walter L. Fleming notes in his history of the American Civil War:

Finally, it was decided to send one commissioner, and the governor appointed Thomas J. Judge, who proceeded to Washington, with authority to negotiate regarding the forts, arsenals, and custom-houses in the state, the state’s share of the United States debt, and the future relations between the United States and Alabama, and through C. C. Clay, late United States senator from Alabama, applied for an interview with the President. Buchanan refused to receive him in his official capacity, but wrote that he would be glad to see him as a private gentleman. Judge declined to be received except in his official capacity, and said that future negotiations must begin at Washington.

Judge twice ran unsuccessfully for the United States House of Representatives as the candidate of the Know Nothing Party, losing to James F. Dowdell in the 1857 election and to David Clopton in the 1859 election.

During the American Civil War, he served as a colonel of 14th Alabama Infantry Regiment from 1861 to 1862, which was brigaded with other Alabama regiments under General LeRoy Pope Walker in September 1861. Judge resigned on July 10, 1862, due to a leg fracture, and was succeeded in that role by Alfred Campbell Wood. Judge remained in service, presiding as judge of a Confederate military court. In 1864, he organized reserve troops in Mobile, Alabama, and he was paroled from service at Meridian, Alabama, on May 9, 1865.

== Judicial service ==
After the war, the legislature convened and elected Judge to the state supreme court, along with Abram Joseph Walker and William M. Byrd, effective January 1, 1866. The Constitution of 1868 reorganized the court, and in the general election of 1874, Judge was again elected to the court, along with Chief Justice Brickell and Amos R. Manning.

Judge served on the Alabama Supreme Court until his death, and his seat on the court was then filled by the appointment of Judge's former law partner, George W. Stone.

== Personal life and death ==
Judge married Susan Jane Graves, with whom he had two daughters. Judge died at his home in Greenville, Alabama, at the age of 60.

Political offices
Preceded by Newly reorganized court Robert C. Brickell	Justice of the Supreme Court of Alabama; 1866–1867; 1874–1876	Succeeded by Newly reorganized court George W. Stone
