= Andalusia High School =

Public high school in Andalusia, Alabama

Coordinates: 31°18′55.61″N 86°28′14.85″W

Location
- 122 Sixth Avenue; Andalusia, Alabama 36420; United States

Information
- Type: Public secondary
- Motto: That's Why
- School district: Andalusia City School System
- CEEB code: 010080
- Principal: Ray Wilson
- Teaching staff: 33.71 (FTE)
- Grades: 9-12
- Enrollment: 471 (2024–2025)
- Student to teacher ratio: 13.97
- Colors: Cardinal and white
- Nickname: Bulldogs
- Yearbook: Memolusia
- Website: highandalusiaal.schoolinsites.com

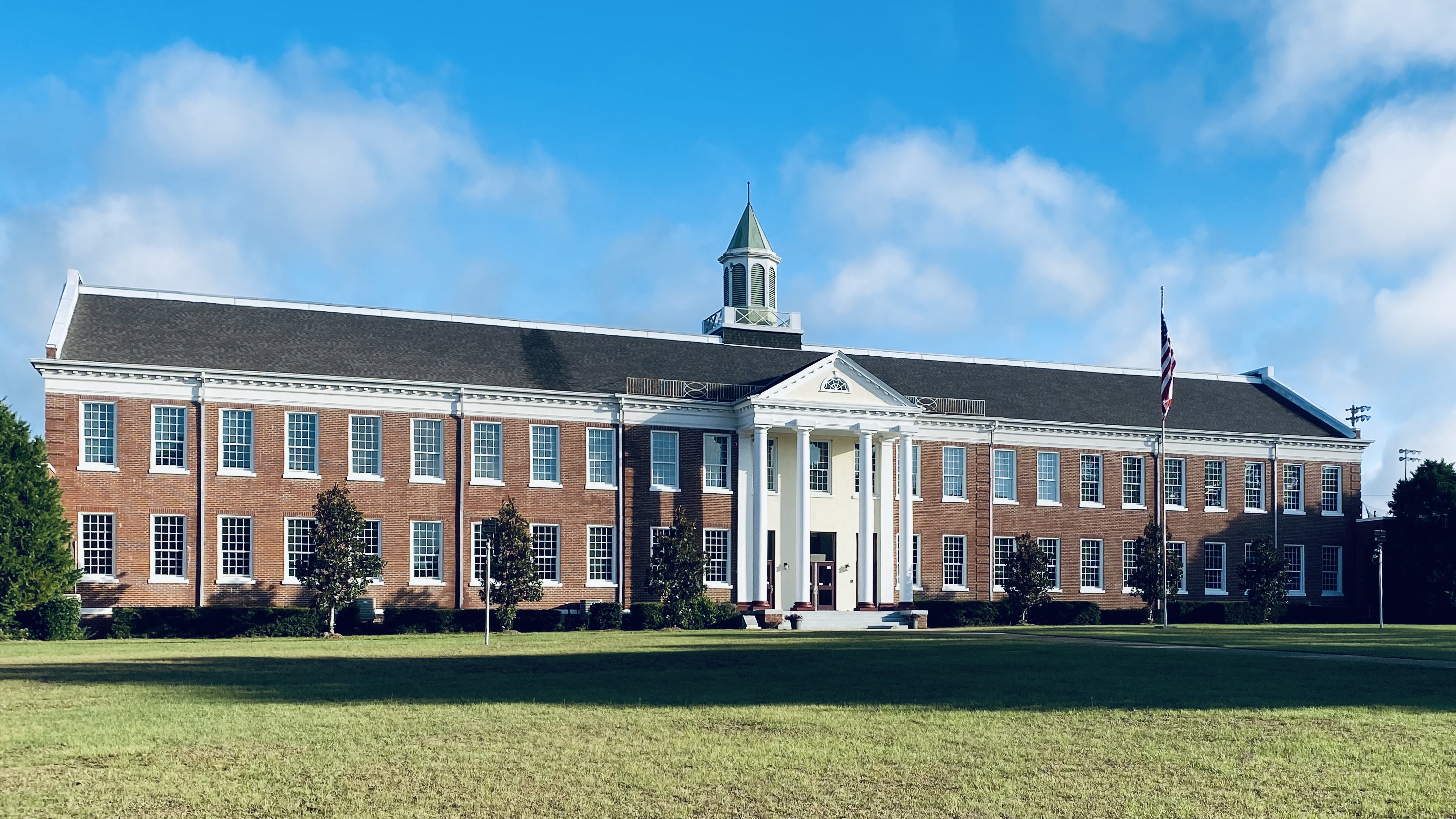
The facade of Andalusia High School

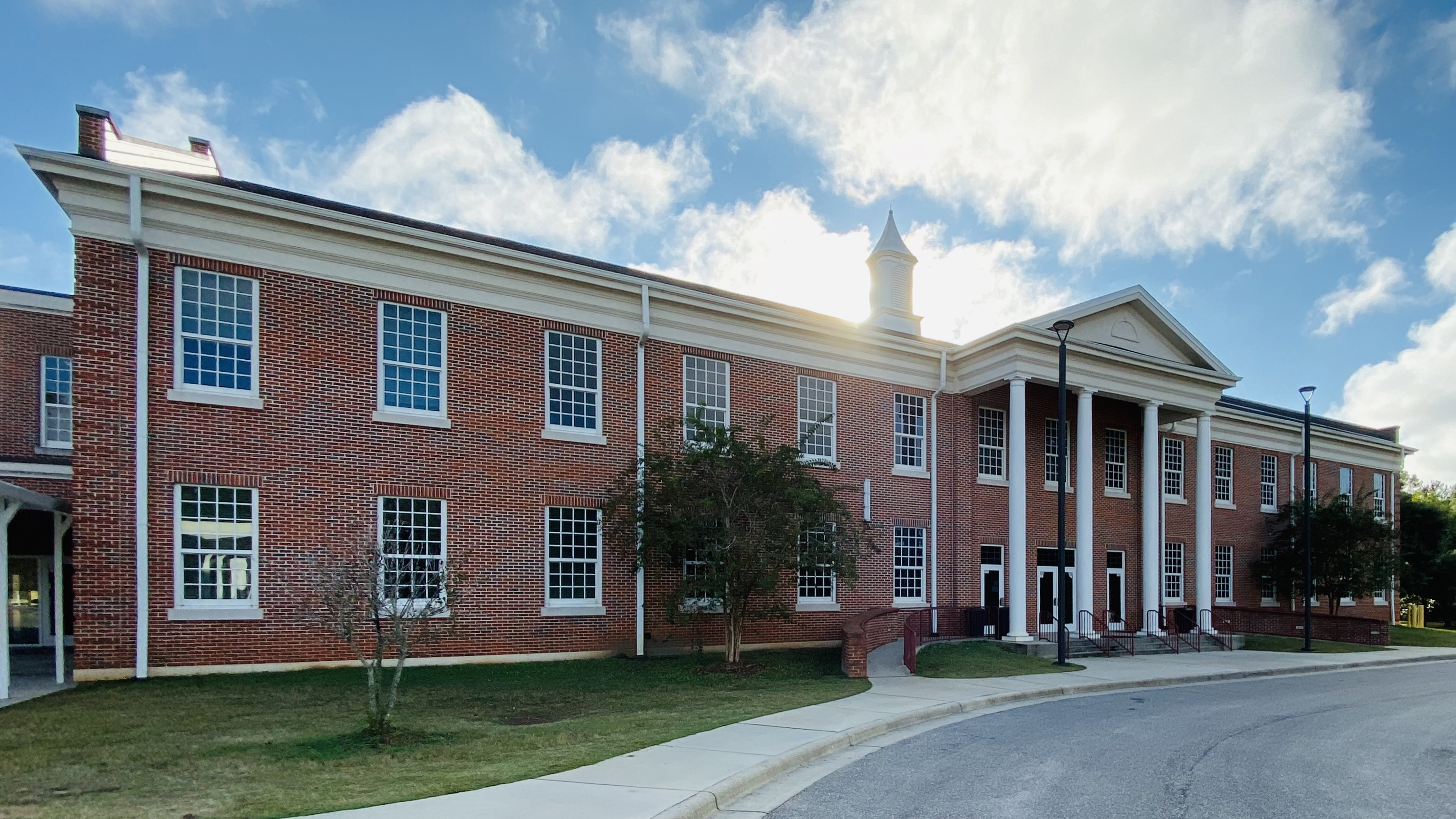
Andalusia Junior High School, which shares the campus of Andalusia High School

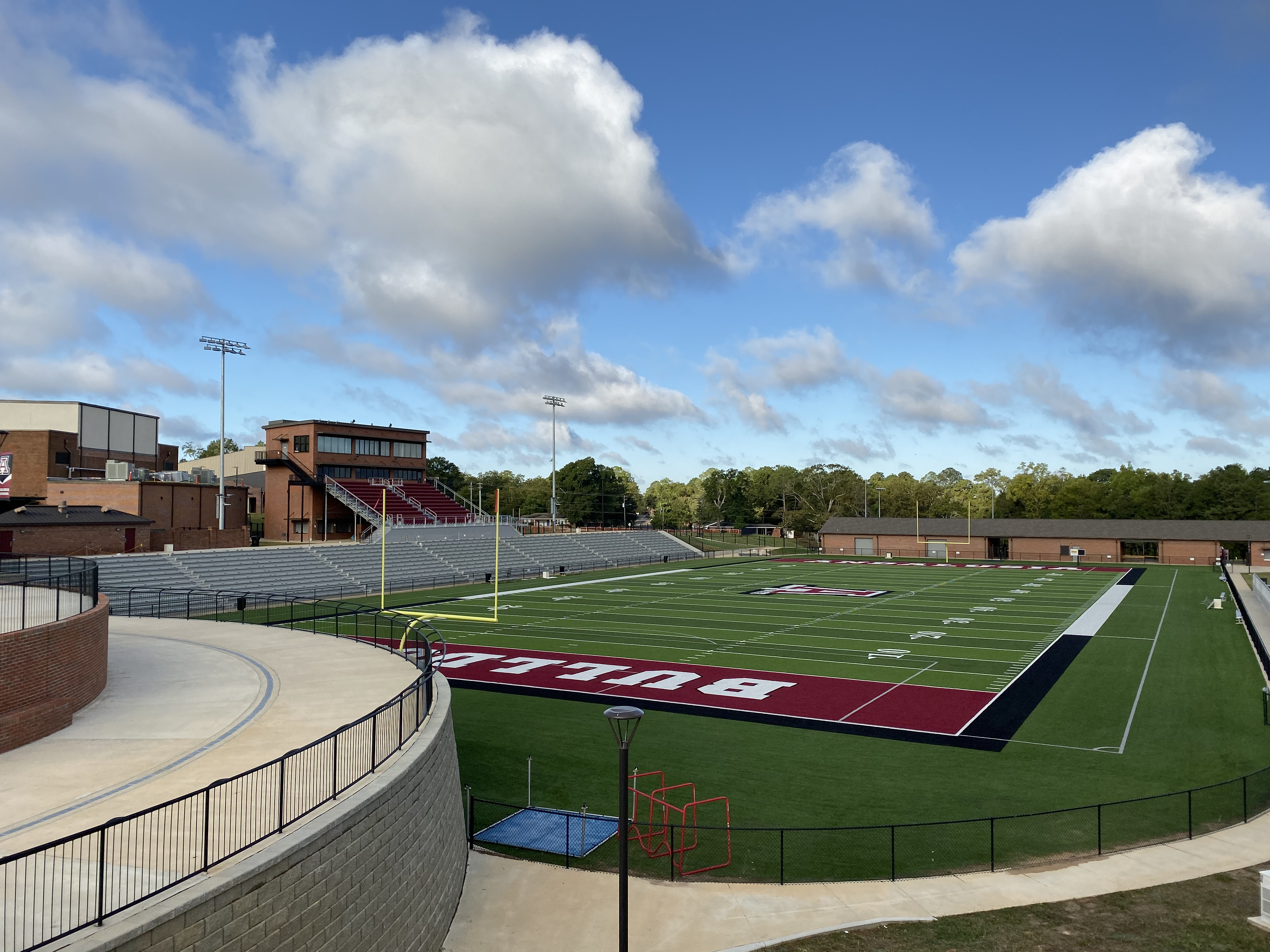
Andalusia High School Stadium, October 2019

Andalusia High School is a high school in Andalusia, Alabama, founded in 1899. The school colors are cardinal and white and the school mascot is the bulldog.

== History ==
Andalusia High School was housed in the Church Street School from 1923 to 1941.

In 2018, the school's football stadium and auditorium were renovated, costing $12 million.

== Demographics ==
AHS is 63 percent white, 33 percent black, two percent Asian, and one percent of students identify as a part of two or more races.

== Athletics ==
The AHS baseball team won a state championship in 2018. In 1996, with a record of 32–4, the AHS Boys basketball team won a state championship in basketball and the AHS girls won in 2002. In 2022, the AHS American football team won their first state championship for the first time in 42 years.

== Notable alumni ==
- Harold Albritton, senior United States district judge of the United States District Court for the Middle District of Alabama
- Jackie Burkett, former NFL player. He transferred to Choctawhatchee High School after his sophomore season.
- Allan George, professional football cornerback
- Robert Horry (1988), former NBA player and seven-time league champion.
- Nico Johnson (2009), NFL player and college football coach
- Mike Jones, member of the Alabama house of representatives
- Walt Merrill, professional football player
- Carlos A. Moon (1925), painter
- Ethan Wilson (2018), MLB player
