= Robert C. Brickell =

American judge (1824–1900)

Robert Coman Brickell (April 4, 1824 – November 20, 1900) was an associate justice of the Supreme Court of Alabama from 1873 to 1874, and chief justice from 1874 to 1884, and again from 1894 to 1898.

== Biography ==
Born in Tuscumbia, Alabama, and raised in Huntsville, Brickell's early education began in his father's print shop. He studied law under Judge Daniel Coleman to gain admission to the Alabama State Bar at 19 and initiated his law practice in Athens, later moving to Huntsville in 1851.

In 1873, he was appointed as an associate justice by Governor David P. Lewis and became Chief Justice in 1875.

Brickell played a significant role in codifying Alabama laws, collaborating with P.J. Hamilton and J.P. Tillman. His judicial tenure as chief justice was intermittently punctuated by health issues. He contributed to the Code of Alabama (1886) and authored editions of "Digest of the Decisions of the Supreme Court of Alabama", commonly known as Brickell's Digest.

Brickell died on November 20, 1900, at the age of 86. Brickell's son, also named Robert Coman Brickell, served as Attorney General of Alabama from 1911 to 1915, and was later a circuit judge.

Political offices
Preceded by Thomas Minott Peters	Justice of the Supreme Court of Alabama; 1873–1874	Succeeded by Thomas J. Judge
Preceded by Thomas Minott Peters; George W. Stone	Chief Justice of the Supreme Court of Alabama; 1874–1884; 1894–1898	Succeeded by George W. Stone; Thomas N. McClellan
