= Matthew Hammett =

American politician

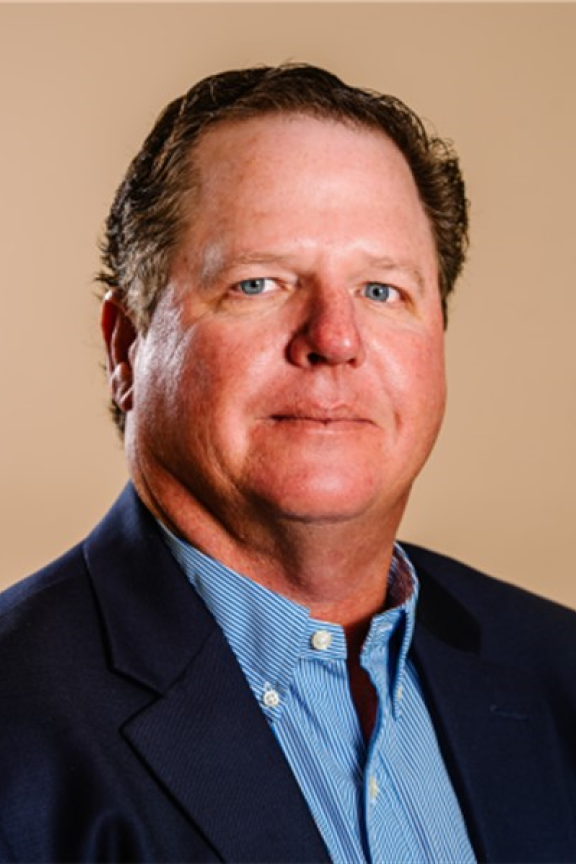

Member of the Alabama House of Representatives from the 92nd district
- Incumbent
- Assumed office November 9, 2022
- Preceded by: Mike Jones

Personal details
- Born: c. 1973 Rose Hill, Alabama, U.S.
- Party: Republican
- Spouse: Selena
- Children: 3
- Education: Auburn University
- Profession: Owner of Hammett Drilling

Matthew Hammett is an American politician who has served as a Republican member of the Alabama House of Representatives since November 8, 2022. He represents Alabama's 92nd House district.

== Electoral history ==
He was elected on November 8, 2022, in the 2022 Alabama House of Representatives election against Democratic opponent Steve Hubbard. He assumed office the next day on November 9, 2022. He served as Covington County Commission Chairman from 1995 to 2020.

== Biography ==
Hammet owns a company named Hammett Drilling. He is the second cousin of Seth Hammett, a former speaker of the house. He is a Methodist.

Alabama House of Representatives
Preceded by Mike Jones	Member of the Alabama House of Representatives; 2022–present	Succeeded by incumbent
