= Mike Jones (Alabama politician) =

American politician

Mike Jones Jr.

Member of the Alabama House of Representatives from the 92nd district
- In office November 3, 2010 – November 9, 2022
- Succeeded by: Matthew Hammett

Personal details
- Born: December 12, 1966 (age 59)
- Party: Republican
- Spouse: Kathy Harper Jones
- Children: 2

Mike Jones Jr. is an American politician from the state of Alabama. He served as a member of the Alabama House of Representatives for District 92. He is a part of the Republican Party.

== Career ==
Jones began his career as an attorney with South Alabama Law in 1994 with a concentration in family law after graduating from the University of Alabama with a JD in 1992. He began his political career in 2000, when he became a councilman in the city of Andalusia, Alabama. In 2004, he began a stint as the Mayor Pro Tempore of Andalusia which lasted until 2008. Professionally, he was a city judge in Andalusia and a special circuit judge with the Covington County Judiciary. In 2009, Jones announced his candidacy for the Alabama State House for District 92. He defeated Greg White in the 2010 Republican primary with 63% of the vote. In November 2010, Jones defeated both Democrat David Darby and Independent candidate Don Cotton with 52.1% of the vote. In 2014, he was unopposed in both the Republican primary and the general election. In 2018, he was unopposed in the Republican party, and he won the general election with 99.2% of the vote. In 2022, Jones ran in the Republican primary for the Alabama State Senate District 31 race. He was defeated by Coffee County Commissioner Josh Carney.

=== Committee Positions ===
Jones served as the chair of the House Rules Committee in the 2019 and 2021 legislative sessions.

== Education ==
As a child of a teacher in the public school system, Jones grew up in Covington County Schools. After graduating Andalusia High School in 1985, Jones enrolled in Lurleen B. Wallace Jr. College. He graduated in 1987 with an A.S. in Chemistry. He then enrolled in Birmingham-Southern College. He graduated in 1989 in a B.S. in Political Science and Government. Jones then attended the University of Alabama Law. He graduated with a J.D. in 1992.

== Elections ==
=== Alabama House of Representatives District 92 ===
2010 Republican Primary
Party	Candidate	Votes	%
Republican	Mike Jones Jr.	3,569	63.3%
Republican	Greg White	2,070	36.7%
Total votes		5,639	100.0%

2010 General Election
Party	Candidate	Votes	%
Republican	Mike Jones Jr.	6,820	52.1%
Democratic	David Darby	3,086	23.6%
Independent	Don Cotton	3,180	24.3%
Total votes		13,086	100.0%

2018 General Election
Party	Candidate	Votes	%
Republican	Mike Jones Jr.	11,912	99.2%
Write-in		92	0.8%
Total votes		12,004	100.0%

=== Alabama State Senate District 31 ===
2022 Republican Primary
Party	Candidate	Votes	%
Republican	Josh Carnley	12,413	50.2%
Republican	Mike Jones Jr.	9,987	40.4%
Republican	Norman Horton	2,328	9.4%
Total votes		24,728	100.0%
