= Goldthwait =

Goldthwait is a surname of English origin. Notable people with the surname include:

- Benjamin Goldthwait, British Army officer
- Bobcat Goldthwait (born 1962), American comedian, filmmaker, actor and voice actor
- Christopher E. Goldthwait (born 1949), American diplomat
- Ezekiel Goldthwait (1710–1782), Influential colonial Bostonian
- Jill Goldthwait, American politician

== Places ==
- Goldthwait Sea, a sea formed after the last ice age that occupied roughly the area of the Gulf of Saint Lawrence
- Mount Goldthwait, a mountain of Ellsworth Land, Antarctica

== See also ==
- Goldthwaite (surname)
- Goldman
