= Lucy Goldthwaite =

American librarian

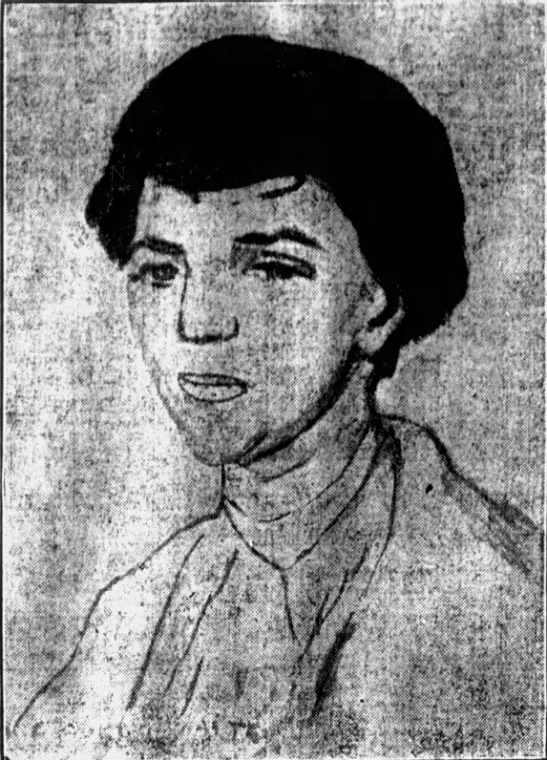
- Lucille Goldthwaite painted by her sister, Anne Goldthwaite
- Born: February 21, 1879
- Died: January 20, 1957 (aged 77)
- Awards: Migel Medal (1946)

Lucille Armistead Goldthwaite (February 21, 1879 – January 20, 1957) was an American librarian who specialized in books for blind readers.

== Early life ==
Lucille Armistead Goldthwaite was born in Dallas, Texas, the daughter of Richard Wallach Goldthwaite, a veteran of the American Civil War, and Lucy Boyd Armistead Goldthwaite. She was raised by relatives in Montgomery, Alabama after both of her parents died in the 1880s. Her older sister was artist Anne Goldthwaite. Her grandfather was George Goldthwaite, the Boston-born United States Senator from Alabama during the Reconstruction era.

== Career ==
Lucy Goldthwaite began working in the New York City libraries in 1899. From 1905 to her retirement in 1941, she was head of the New York Public Library's Library for the Blind program. She spoke on her work at the annual meeting of the American Association of Workers for the Blind in 1910. She was active on the American Library Association's Committee on Work for the Blind. She was founder and editor of the Braille Book Review from 1932 to 1951, and managing editor of Outlook for the Blind during World War II. With input from her patrons, she advocated for more popular, current, and recreational reading for lending in audio formats.

Goldthwaite served on the New York State Commission on the Blind for twenty years, from 1913 to 1933. In retirement she worked part-time for the American Foundation for the Blind. In 1946, fellow Alabamian Helen Keller presented Goldthwaite with the Migel Award from the American Foundation for the Blind, for "outstanding service to the blind".

== Personal life ==
Lucy Armistead Goldthwaite died from a heart attack in 1957, aged 78 years, in St. Augustine, Florida.
