= Rose Hill, Alabama =

Unincorporated community in Alabama, United States

- Unincorporated community
- Location within Alabama Location within the United States
- Coordinates: 31°26′58″N 86°20′22″W
- Country: United States
- State: Alabama
- County: Covington
- Elevation: 433 ft (132 m)
- Time zone: UTC-6 (Central (CST))
  - Summer (DST): UTC-5 (CDT)
- Area code: 334
- GNIS feature ID: 125934

Rose Hill is an unincorporated community in Covington County, Alabama, United States.

== History ==
The community name may come from a personal name or an environmental name. A post office operated under the name Rose Hill from 1855 to 1906.

Company F of the 33rd Regiment Alabama Infantry was organized at Brandon's Store in Rose Hill.

== Notable people ==
Matthew Hammett, American politician born in Rose Hill
