= Rice-Semple-Haardt House =

Historic house in Alabama, United States

- Semple House
- U.S. National Register of Historic Places
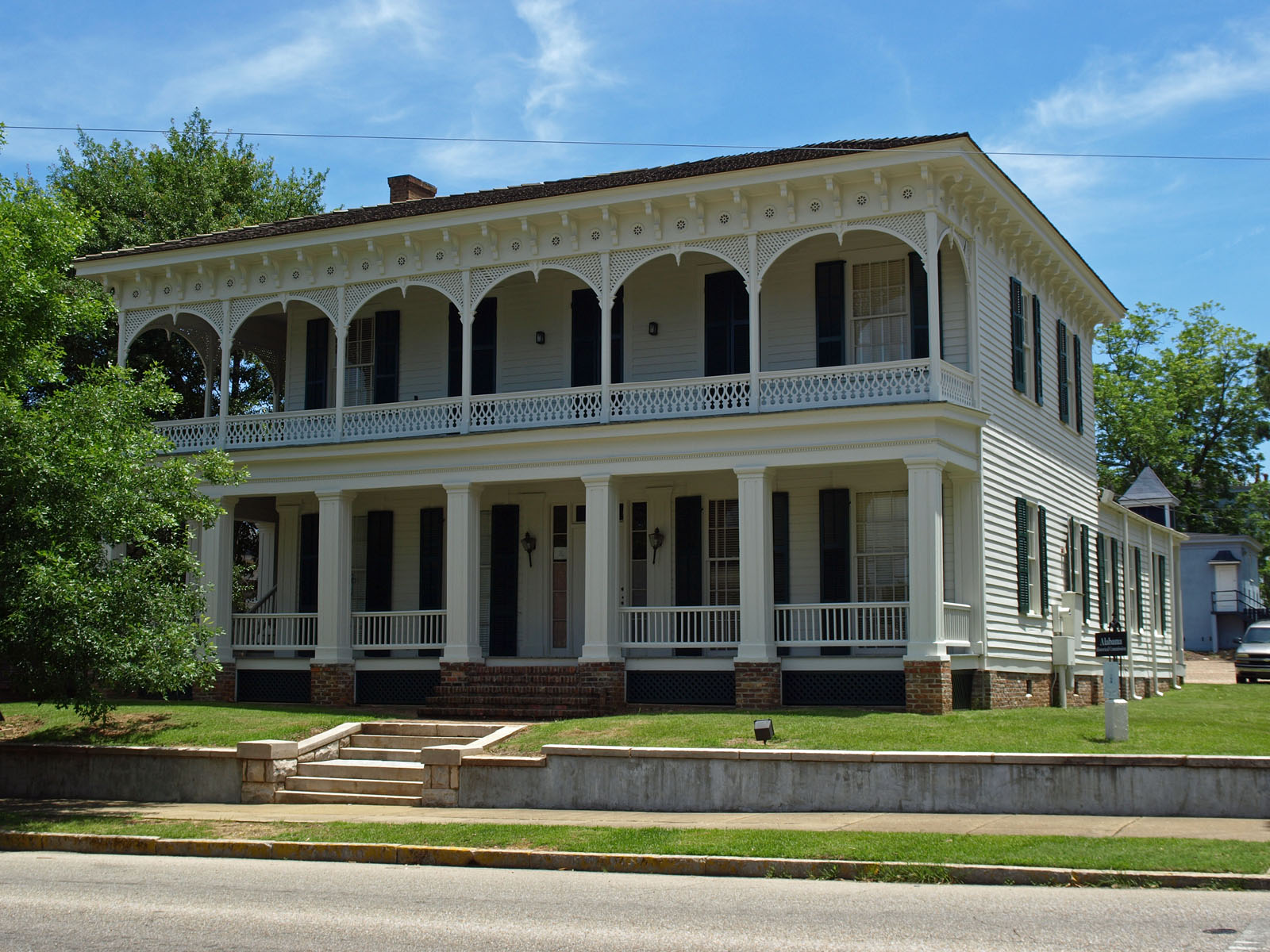
- The Rice-Semple-Haardt House in 2009

- Location within Alabama Location within the United States
- Location: 725 Monroe Street, Montgomery, Alabama
- Coordinates: 32°22′44″N 86°17′56″W
- Area: less than one acre
- Built: 1851
- NRHP reference No.: 72000174
- Added to NRHP: September 27, 1972

The Rice-Semple-Haardt House is a historic house in Montgomery, Alabama, U.S.

== History ==
The house was built in the early 1850s for Samuel Farrow Rice, who served as a member of the Alabama House of Representatives and the Alabama Senate, and later as Chief Justice of the Alabama Supreme Court.

In the late 1860s, the house was purchased by Henry Churchill Semple, a veteran of the Confederate States Army. The house remained in the Semple family until 1924. It was later acquired by John Haardt, a realtor, and used as offices.

By 1970, it was purchased by the state of Alabama.

== Architectural significance ==
It has been listed on the National Register of Historic Places since September 27, 1972.
