= History of the University of North Alabama =

A comprehensive regional university today, the University of North Alabama traces its beginnings to the first half of the 19th century, when the Methodist Episcopal Church sought to bring learning and culture to an obscure mountain in Alabama.

== LaGrange College ==
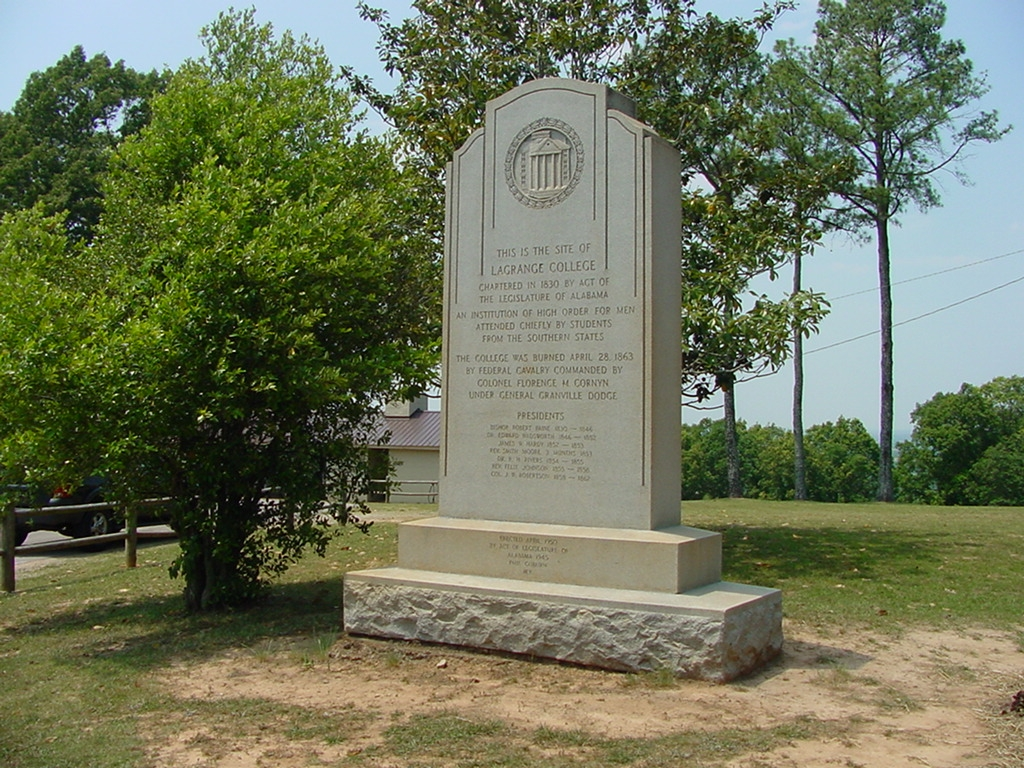
Monument marking the site of LaGrange College

The University of North Alabama was preceded by LaGrange College which opened January 11, 1830, in a mountain hamlet a few miles south of Leighton in eastern Colbert County, Alabama. LaGrange means "The Barn" in French. Twenty-one local college trustees were listed in Acts of Alabama, Eleventh Annual Session.

LaGrange College arose from the idea offered at a November 28, 1826 meeting of the Tennessee Conference of the Methodist Episcopal Church to establish a college which would not be "religious or theological". By January 1829, the selection of Lawrence Hill on LaGrange Mountain was made for the site of the school.

A year later, LaGrange College opened to students of all denominations in two three-story brick buildings. (This was slightly more than a year before the University of Alabama would open in Tuscaloosa.) Eight days after the opening of LaGrange College, the Alabama Legislature issued a charter for the institution, making it the first state-chartered institution to begin operation in Alabama. Other colleges were in operation, but not chartered by the state.

Robert Paine was the first president. The North Carolina native was also the professor of moral science and belles lettres and taught geography and mineralogy. He was assisted by two other professors. The first board of trustees had a total of 50 members, including two Native Americans, a Choctaw politician and a Cherokee leader. In 1830, Turner Saunders, a native of Virginia, was the first President of the Board of Trustees. Saunders' mansion c1826 still stands in Lawrence County. Among the many distant trustees was John Coffee of Florence, friend of Andrew Jackson. Among the local trustees was Henry Stuart Foote of Tuscumbia, who would move to Mississippi and defeat Jefferson Davis in the 1850 Governor's race. J.D. Malone, of Limestone County, was the first graduate in 1833.

In 1850, a grammar school was added to LaGrange College. (Today, UNA has the only university-owned and operated elementary laboratory school - Kilby Professional Laboratory School - in Alabama.)

Among LaGrange's alumni were several generals, Alabama governors Edward A. O'Neal and David P. Lewis, Alabama Supreme Court justice William M. Byrd, and U.S. Senator Jeremiah Clemens, who wrote the first American Civil War novel and the first western novel. Two of the founders the Ku Klux Klan in Pulaski, Tennessee, brothers Frank O. McCord and Luther McCord, were also former LaGrange College students.

=== LaGrange College and Military Academy ===
In 1858, following the death of the school's president and the loss of most of its students to nearby Florence, the college was suspended and re-established as the LaGrange College and Military Academy, with James W. Robertson as superintendent. Under its new name, additional buildings were constructed and the school reached its highest prosperity. The state of Alabama made provision for two cadets from each county to be enrolled, and by 1861 47 of its 171 students were state cadets. The school suffered a loss of enrollment again when Alabama seceded, and in March 1862 Robertson received approval from the Alabama governor to enroll the 35th Alabama Infantry from faculty, cadets, and enlistees from surrounding counties.

On April 28, 1863, the buildings were destroyed by Union soldiers of the 10th Missouri Cavalry, including a library of 4,000 volumes.

Today, a nine-ton stone monument marks the former location of the LaGrange community and college.

== Florence Wesleyan University ==
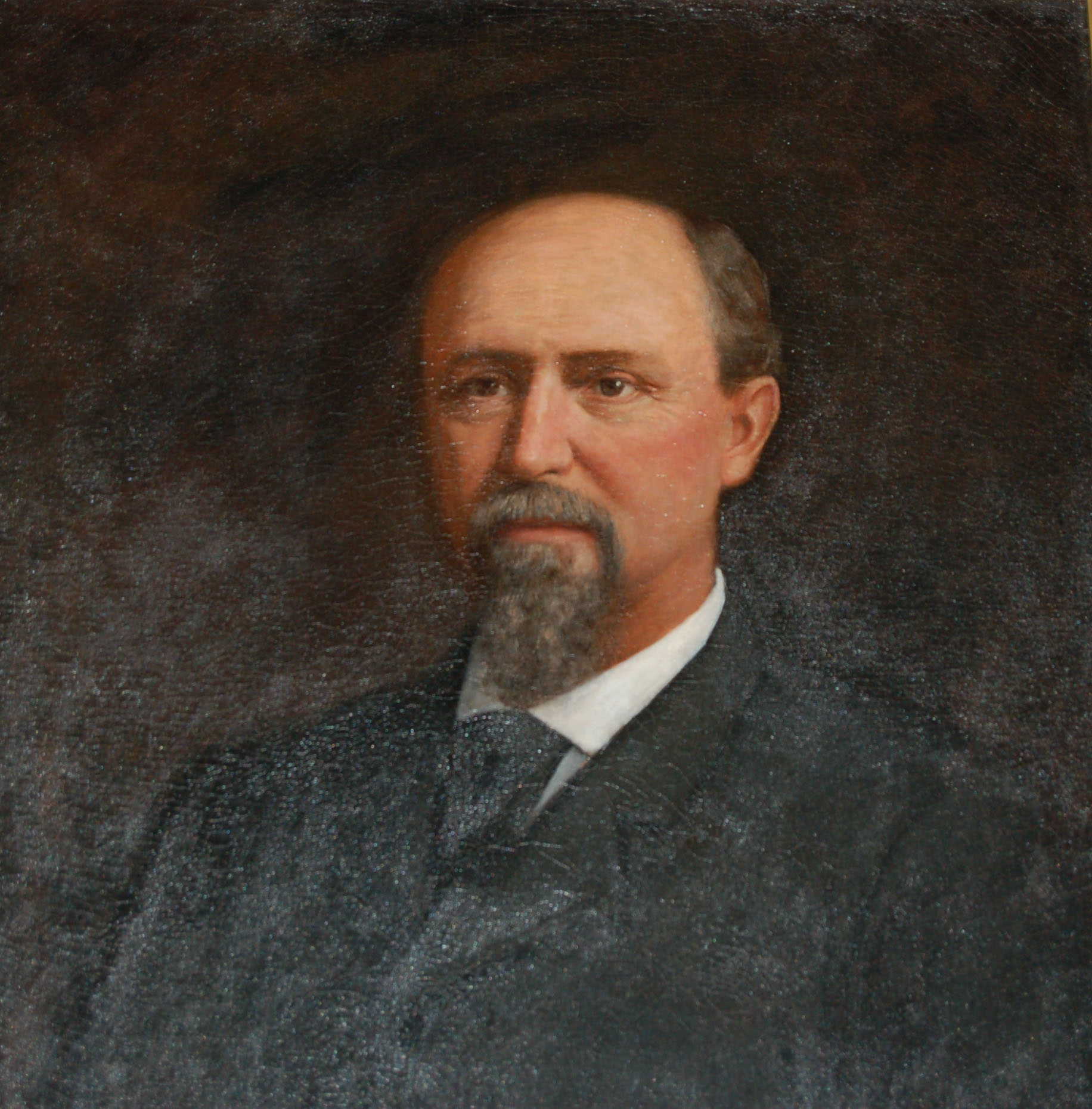
Lawrence Sullivan Ross, Confederate States Army general and Texas governor, 1887–1891, was a graduate of Florence Wesleyan University, now the University of North Alabama

LaGrange graduate R.H. Rivers, after becoming president of the college, led most of the students and all but one faculty member from the mountain in late 1854 to relocate to Florence.

Those who accompanied the school across the Tennessee River to Florence fully expected that the institutional name, LaGrange College, would be carried over as well. After the move, however, the Alabama Legislature passed a bill to reincorporate the institution under a new name, Florence Wesleyan University. Governor John A. Winston vetoed the bill to incorporate under the new name, but the Alabama Legislature voted to override his veto.

19th-century presidents and years
President	Years
Robert Paine	1830–1846
Edward Wadsworth	1847–1852
James Ward Hardy	1852–1853
Smith W. Moore (acting)	1853
R. H. Rivers	1854–1861
Robert A. Young	1862–1865
Septimus P. Rice (acting)	1865–1868
William H. Anderson	1868–1871
Transition Period	1872–1873
Septimus P. Rice	1873–1881
Hardie A. Brown	1881–1885
James A. Heard	1885–1886
T. J. Mitchell	1886–1887
James Knox Powers	1887–1897

Admission to Florence Wesleyan required an acquaintance with English grammar, arithmetic, geography and the Latin and Greek Grammar. Prospective students also were required to demonstrate an ability to translate four books of Caesar's Gallic Wars, six books of Virgil's Aeneid, Jacob's or Felton's Greek Reader, and at least one of Xenophon's Anabasis.

One-hundred sixty students enrolled in the first year of operation (1855) of Florence Wesleyan University. The school quickly attracted students from five states and two foreign countries. Among Florence Wesleyan's graduates were Alabama Governor Emmet O'Neal and Texas Governor Lawrence Sullivan "Sul" Ross (the latter of whose tenure as president of Texas A&M University was known as the "golden age" of that institution). Ross also is the namesake of Sul Ross University in Alpine, Texas.

Though the bloody four-year conflict between North and South loomed, the years immediately preceding the outbreak of the Civil War are considered the best years of the institution during the 19th century. The fledgling university was entirely out of debt and even had amassed an endowment of $50,000. The faculty was considered first rate for the time and place.

=== The Civil War ===
The American Civil War bestowed much hardship on the institution. Following the firing on Fort Sumter on April 12, 1861, and President Lincoln's subsequent call for 75,000 troops, four professors and more than one hundred students left the school to take up arms.

During the war, Wesleyan Hall, the university's only building, was occupied by both Union and Confederate armies.

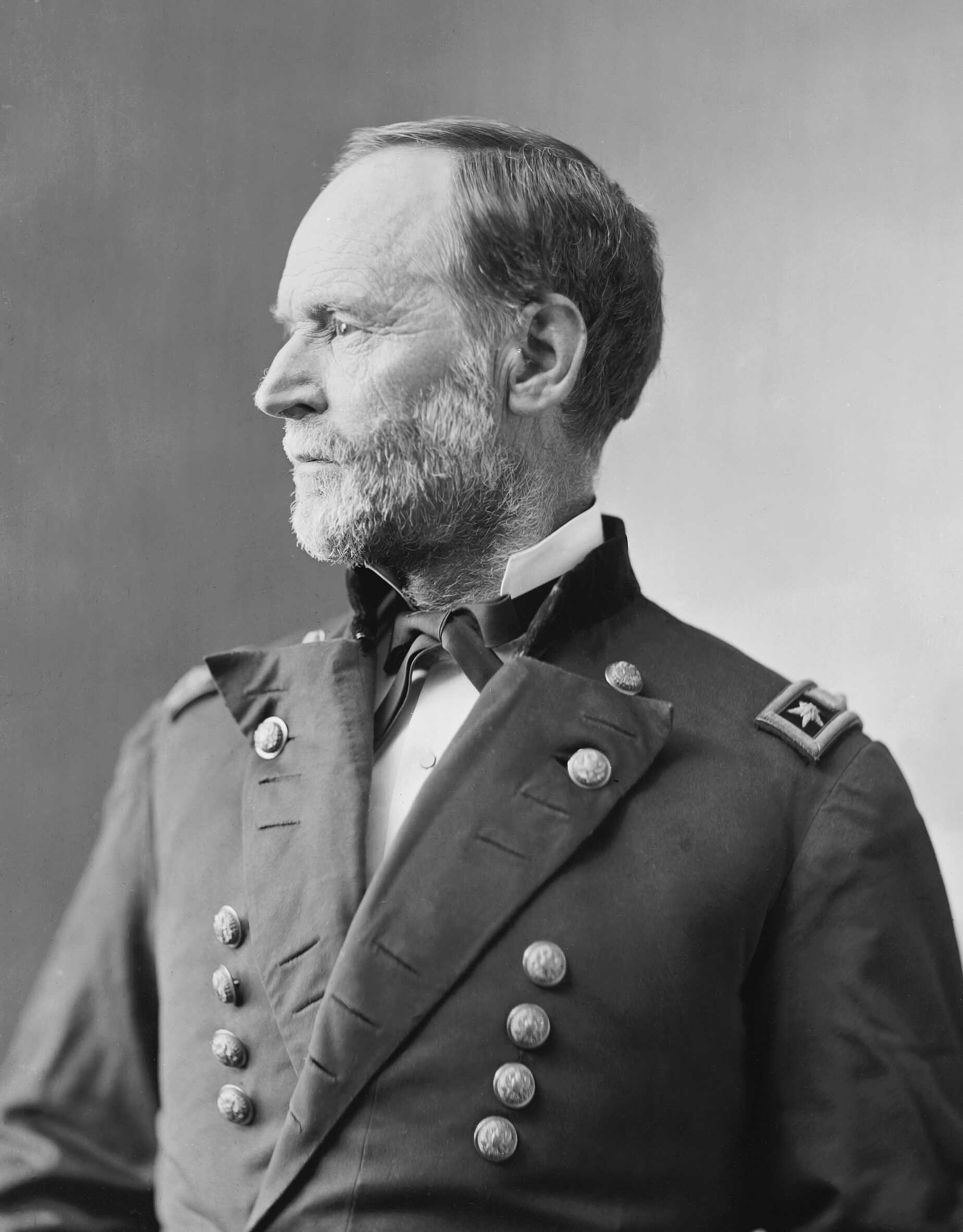
General William Tecumseh Sherman is considered the most famous Union officer to occupy Wesleyan Hall during the Civil War.

General William Tecumseh Sherman is considered the most famous Union occupant of Wesleyan Hall during the war. In late 1864, shortly before his ill-fated involvement in the battles of Franklin and Nashville, Confederate General John Bell Hood occupied the building. The surrounding grounds were occupied by his troops and served as a meeting place for military personnel and townspeople for parties, dances and concerts. Confederate Generals Pierre G.T. Beauregard and Stephen D. Lee also occupied the adjoining grounds during the war and also may have used Wesleyan Hall as their headquarters.

Robert A. Young, president of Florence Wesleyan at the time, is credited with saving the institution from destruction.

In addition to Lawrence "Sul" Ross, who also was a general in the Confederate States Army, LaGrange College and Florence Wesleyan University produced three other Civil War generals: Confederate Generals Edward A. O'Neal (later an Alabama governor) and John Gregg and Union General Daniel McCook, Jr.

Following the war, Septimus Rice was the University's sole instructor, teaching classes in the Preparatory School and holding college-level courses in Wesleyan Hall. Despite a prolonged effort by the new Wesleyan University president, William H. Anderson, the institution continued to founder, and in 1871, the doors of Wesleyan Hall were closed.

Recognizing the need for trained teachers in the post-war South, the Methodist Episcopal Church turned over Wesleyan Hall and the surrounding 12-acre (49,000 m^{2}) grounds to the state of Alabama, which then chartered it as a state normal school.

== As a state school ==
=== State Normal School at Florence ===
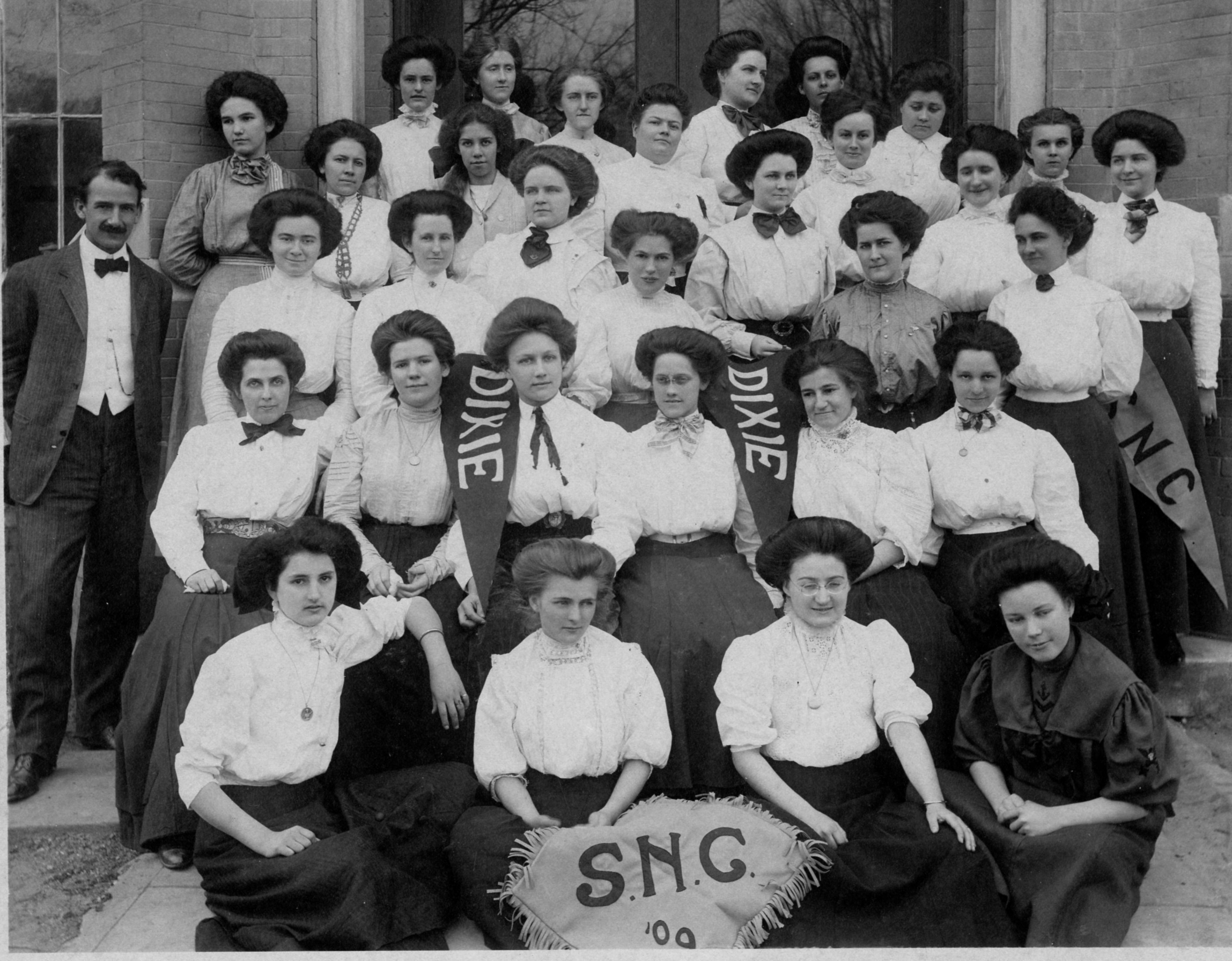
Members of the Dixie Club, Florence State Normal College, 1909

When the Methodist Church deeded Florence Wesleyan to the State of Alabama in 1872, the institution became the State Normal School at Florence, the first state-supported teachers college south of the Ohio River. Tuition to the State Normal School at Florence was free on the condition that students taught for two years at any Alabama public school after graduation.

A year after its becoming a state school, the institution opened its doors to women, making it one of the first co-educational institutions in the nation. Yet no women attended the school until 1874, when 31 young women enrolled. The first woman joined the faculty in 1879.

Florence Normal School's Newton W. Bates, professor of language and literature, published his History of Civil Government of Alabama in 1892, the first textbook on the history of Alabama.

=== State Normal College ===
In 1888, the school underwent a name change from State Normal School to State Normal College. That same year, James Knox Powers, a Florence native and Wesleyan University alumnus, became the fifth president.

At the beginning of Powers' tenure, the college's curriculum encompassed three courses of study: an elementary course to prepare aspiring teachers for primary and elementary education; an advanced course, involving an extra year's academic work in academic and professional subjects; and a professional course for high school graduates and "cultured" individuals who had no previous training in the teaching arts.

By 1897, when Powers left to assume the presidency of the University of Alabama and was replaced by Marshall Clark Wilson, the campus had changed little. Wesleyan Hall remained the only building owned by the college, and the campus still was confined to the original 12 acres (49,000 m^{2}).

T.S. Stribling, one of the university's most noteworthy alumni, graduated from Florence State Normal School in 1903. He is recognized as one of the leaders of the Southern Renaissance for his novels Birthright, The Forge, The Store and the Unfinished Cathedral. The Pulitzer Prize-winning novelist and author also outsold contemporaries William Faulkner and Ernest Hemingway during the interwar period of the 1920s and 1930s.

=== Florence State Teachers College ===
20th- and 21st-century presidents
Name	Years
Marshall C. Wilson	1897–1911
James Knox Powers	1911–1913
Robert Harrison (acting)	1913
Henry J. Willingham	1913–1938
James Albert Keller	1938–1948
F. E. Lund (acting)	1948
Ethelbert B. Norton	1948–1972
Robert M. Guillot	1972–1989
Robert L. Potts (acting)	1990
Robert L. Potts (permanent)	1990–2004
G. Garry Warren (acting)	2004–2005
William G. Cale, Jr.	2005–2014
John G. Thornell (interim)	2014–2015
Kenneth D. Kitts	2015–present

The institution functioned as a normal school for more than 50 years until 1929, when it became a state teachers college offering a four-year curriculum in elementary education.

The first bachelor's degrees were awarded in 1931. Less than a decade later, the curriculum was expanded to include a four-year course of study in secondary education. In 1947, the curriculum was expanded again to include A.B. and B.S. degree programs in fields other than teacher training.

=== Florence State College ===
The university seal, bearing one of the university's previous names, Florence State College, is displayed in the masonry bordering Guillot University Center.

Progress continued apace toward the comprehensive university the institution ultimately would become. In 1956, the institution crossed another academic milestone with the formation of a graduate course of study in education leading to the Master of Arts degree. With the establishment of a new Graduate Division, the graduate program was launched in the summer of 1957. The same year, the Alabama Legislature voted to change the institution's name to Florence State College to reflect its expanding academic mission.

==== Integration at Florence State College ====
Compared with other southern institutions of higher learning, particularly the universities of Alabama and Mississippi, integration occurred almost painlessly at Florence State College.

In 1963, Wendell Wilkie Gunn became the African-American student to enroll at the college. Gunn, a resident of Florence, had been attending Tennessee A&I and maintaining a B average there. The tuition and board there had become unaffordable for his family, and he applied to Florence State College in order to be able to live at home while attending classes. Even though Gunn had the support of the college's president and administration, Florence State College denied Gunn's application. Then-President E.B. Norton sent Gunn a letter informing him that the Alabama Legislature and Board of Education would not allow the college to accept his application. U.S. District Court Judge H.H. Grooms heard a class action lawsuit. The court found there was no reason to prevent Gunn from being accepted to the school, other than his race, and the court ordered the school accept Gunn. Gunn graduated with a degree in chemistry two years later.

Speaking at UNA in 2005, famed civil rights attorney Fred Gray, who had represented Gunn, recalled that the hearing that integrated UNA lasted only ten minutes, after which Gunn returned to campus and enrolled. Gray describes the episode as "the easiest case of my civil rights career". The school was the second state-supported institution of higher learning in Alabama to integrate, after the University of Alabama.

Gunn, who later earned degrees from Florence State College and the University of Chicago, went on to a distinguished career in finance and in 1982, was appointed an international trade adviser to President Ronald Reagan.

=== Florence State University ===
Yet another major milestone was crossed in 1967 when the Alabama Legislature removed jurisdiction for the college from the State Board of Education and vested it in a board of trustees. Scarcely a year later, the new board voted for another name change to Florence State University, once again symbolizing the steady expansion of the institution's academic offerings and mission.

Norton, who was president at the time this name was adopted, is distinguished as the only president in the university's history to preside over three institutional name changes: Florence State Teachers College, followed by Florence State College in 1957, and, roughly a decade later, by Florence State University.

The change of name also occurred during the most significant physical plant expansion in the school's history. More than 30 acres (120,000 m^{2}) additional were added to the campus in the late 1960s. Construction included the ten-story Rivers Hall dormitory for men and the eight-story Rice Hall for women. Other structures completed during this period included an addition to Collier Library, the Lurleen Burns Wallace Fine Arts Center, Lafayette and LaGrange Halls, Floyd Hall Science Building, the Planetarium/Observatory, apartments for married students, the Bennett Infirmary, physical education facilities and Flowers Hall.

These changes also were accompanied by an extensive reorganization of the university's academic and administrative structure, including the establishment of separate schools within the university.

=== The University of North Alabama ===
Institutional names
Name	Year
LaGrange College	1830
Florence Wesleyan University	1855
State Normal School at Florence	1872
State Normal College	1889
State Normal School	1913
Florence State Teachers College	1929
Florence State College	1957
Florence State University	1968
University of North Alabama	1974

Robert M. Guillot replaced outgoing President E.B. Norton on April 1, 1972, vowing to transform the small institution into a highly regarded regional university. What followed was one of the most significant periods of growth in the institution's history. Enrollment grew from slightly more than 3,000 to more than 5,000 in fewer than five years.

Guillot also developed a Greek system on campus, confident that fraternities and sororities would enhance the academic and social environment and entice more students to remain on campus during weekends.

On August 15, 1974, the university underwent another change of name to the University of North Alabama, symbolizing its coming of age as a comprehensive, regional university. The following year, the graduate curriculum once again was expanded with the introduction of the master's degree program in business administration.

Guillot also directed a substantial expansion of the university's physical plant, including the construction of the Education and Nursing Building (now Stevens Hall), additions to Collier Library, Flowers Hall, and the Student Union Building (later renamed Guillot University Center), and renovation of Braly Municipal Stadium.

Following a reorganization in 1991, the university's administrative structure consists of four divisions: Academic Affairs, Business Affairs, Student Affairs and Advancement, each headed by a vice president. In 1993, the Board of Trustees, anticipating continued and steady enrollment growth, adopted a new master facilities plan to ensure that UNA ultimately will be equipped to accommodate 10,000 students.

Robert L. Potts, who succeeded Guillot following his resignation in 1989, undertook a series of measures to compensate for shortfalls in state funding, including the reactivation of the UNA Foundation as the university's charitable arm. Two other measures included the reorganization of the alumni relations department and provision for an annual giving program.

Curriculum expansion continued with the establishment of new graduate programs in English and criminal justice. The university's nationally-renowned commercial music program was enhanced with the development of an Entertainment Development Center. UNA also emerged as an early leader of distance learning.

International student enrollment also underwent explosive growth. By 2004, international enrollment increasing to nearly 300 students representing 35 countries.

William G. Cale Jr., became president of the University of North Alabama on January 15, 2005, four days after the university marked the 175th anniversary of its founding as LaGrange College. A Philadelphia native, Cale came to UNA from Pennsylvania State University-Altoona, where he was chief executive officer and dean. Previously, he was the executive vice president for Academic Affairs at Lamar University in Beaumont, Texas.

After an interim by John G. Thornell, then vice-president, the presidency was assumed in 2015 by Kenneth D. Kitts, formerly provost at the University of North Carolina at Pembroke. Kitts also taught at Francis Marion University in South Carolina, the University of South Carolina, and Appalachian State University in North Carolina.
