= Allan George =

American football player (born 1999)

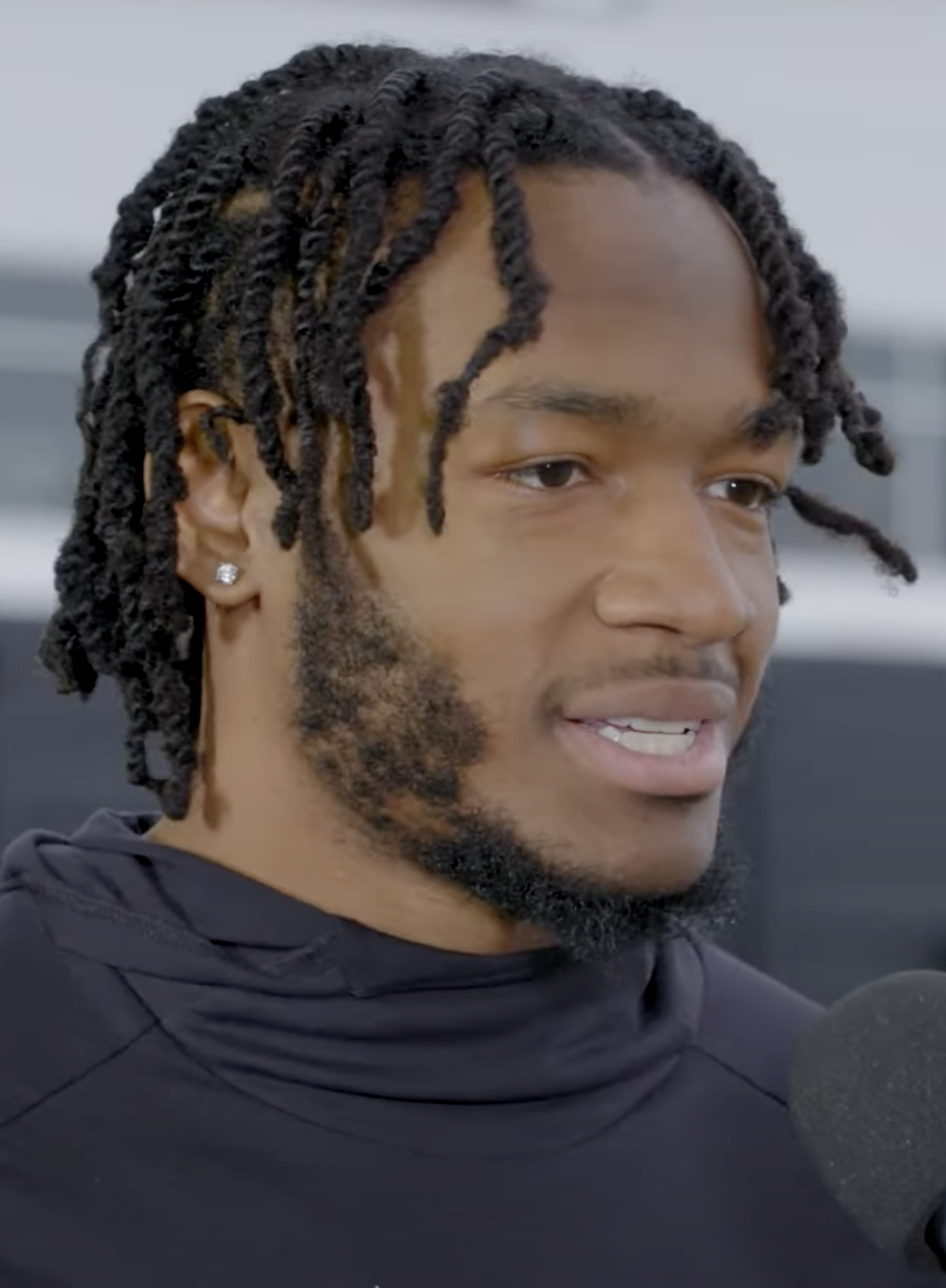
- George in 2022

Profile
- Position: Cornerback

Personal information
- Born: July 16, 1999 (age 27); Andalusia, Alabama, U.S.
- Listed height: 6 ft 1 in (1.85 m)
- Listed weight: 195 lb (88 kg)

Career information
- High school: Andalusia
- College: Vanderbilt (2017–2021)
- NFL draft: 2022: undrafted

Career history
- Cincinnati Bengals (2022–2023); Washington Commanders (2025)*; Detroit Lions (2025)*; Orlando Storm (2026)
- * Offseason or practice squad member only

Career NFL statistics as of 2024
- Tackles: 2
- Stats at Pro Football Reference

Darian Allan George (born July 16, 1999) is an American professional football cornerback. He played college football for the Vanderbilt Commodores and signed with the Cincinnati Bengals as an undrafted free agent in 2022.

== Professional career ==
Pre-draft measurables
Height	Weight	Arm length	Hand span	Wingspan	40-yard dash	10-yard split	20-yard split	20-yard shuttle	Three-cone drill	Vertical jump	Broad jump	Bench press
5 ft 11 1/4 in (1.81 m)	191 lb (87 kg)	32 3/4 in (0.83 m)	9 in (0.23 m)	6 ft 8 1/2 in (2.04 m)	4.50 s	1.47 s	2.59 s	4.34 s	7.04 s	40.5 in (1.03 m)	11 ft 4 in (3.45 m)	15 reps
All values from Pro Day

=== Cincinnati Bengals ===
After going unselected in the 2022 NFL draft, George was signed by the Cincinnati Bengals as an undrafted free agent. Although he initially made the Bengals' final roster, George was released on September 5. The following day, he was re-signed to the practice squad. He was elevated to the active roster on November 5, and made his NFL debut the following day against the Carolina Panthers. George would also be elevated Week 15 against the Tampa Bay Buccaneers. George was signed to the active roster on January 2, 2023. He would play mostly special teams snaps for the team in the playoffs.

George was released by the Bengals on August 29, 2023, and was re-signed to the practice squad the next day. Following the end of the 2023 regular season, the Bengals signed him to a reserve/future contract on January 8, 2024.

On August 23, 2024, George was released by the Bengals.

=== Washington Commanders ===
On January 17, 2025, George signed a futures contract with the Washington Commanders. He was released by the Commanders on August 11.

=== Detroit Lions ===
On August 14, 2025, George signed with the Detroit Lions. He was waived on August 26 as part of final roster cuts.

=== Orlando Storm ===
On January 14, 2026, George was selected by the Orlando Storm in the 2026 UFL Draft. He was released on April 28.
