= Samuel Farrow Rice =

American judge (1816–1890)

Personal details
- Born: June 2, 1816 Union County, South Carolina, U.S.
- Died: January 3, 1890 (aged 73) Montgomery, Alabama, U.S.
- Party: Republican
- Spouse(s): Amanda Butler; Mary Ellen Fitzgibbon
- Children: 1 son, 2 daughters
- Education: South Carolina College
- Occupation: Jurist, politician

Samuel Farrow Rice (June 2, 1816 – January 3, 1890) was an American jurist and politician. He was a member of the Alabama House of Representatives and the Alabama Senate. He served as the tenth Chief Justice of the Supreme Court of Alabama from 1856 to 1859.

== Early life ==
Samuel Farrow Rice was born on June 2, 1816, in Union County, South Carolina. His father, Judge William Rice, served as a member of the South Carolina Senate. His mother, Sarah Pines Herndon, was the sister of Colonel Zachariah Pines Herndon. One of his maternal aunts married Congressman Samuel Farrow.

Rice graduated from South Carolina College, now known as the University of South Carolina, in 1833. He went on to study the law under Senator William C. Preston, and he was admitted to the bar in 1837.

== Career ==
Rice began his legal career in Winnsboro, South Carolina, but settled to Talladega, Alabama in 1838, where he opened a practice with Senator John Tyler Morgan. He was also a newspaper editor, the Democratic Watchtower, for six years. He served as a member of the Alabama House of Representatives for Talladega County from 1840 to 1841. He ran for the United States Congress in 1845, 1848 and 1851, but lost each time.

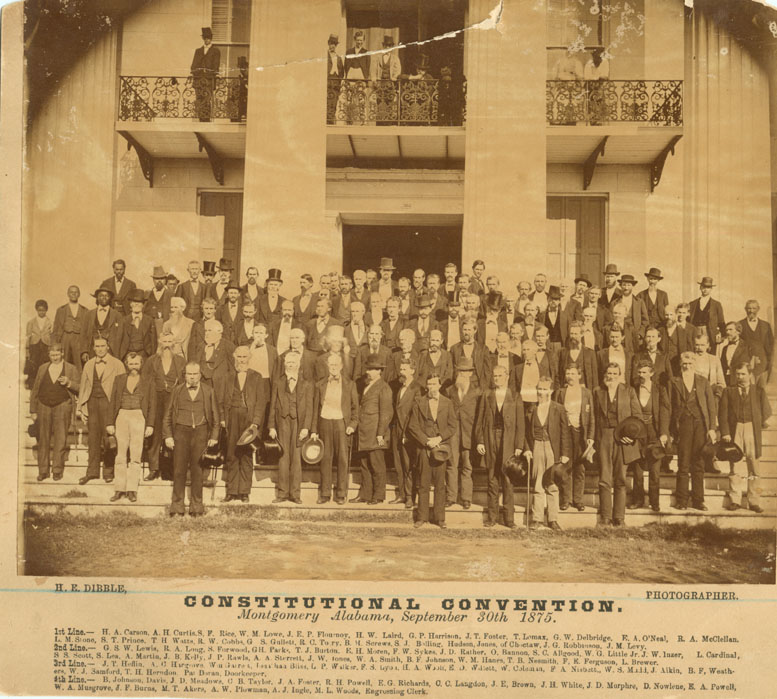
Delegates at the 1875 Alabama Constitutional Convention

Rice moved to Montgomery in 1852. By 1855, he became associate judge on the Supreme Court of Alabama. He served as its chief justice from 1856 to 1859. He served as a member of the Alabama House of Representatives for Montgomery County in 1859, and as a member of the Alabama Senate for Montgomery County and Autauga County during the American Civil War of 1861–1865.

After the war, Rice joined the Republican Party. He was a delegate at Alabama's 1875 Constitutional Convention. He served as a member of the Alabama House of Representatives for Montgomery County in 1876. He also opened a legal practice with Confederate Major Henry C. Semple.

== Personal life and death ==
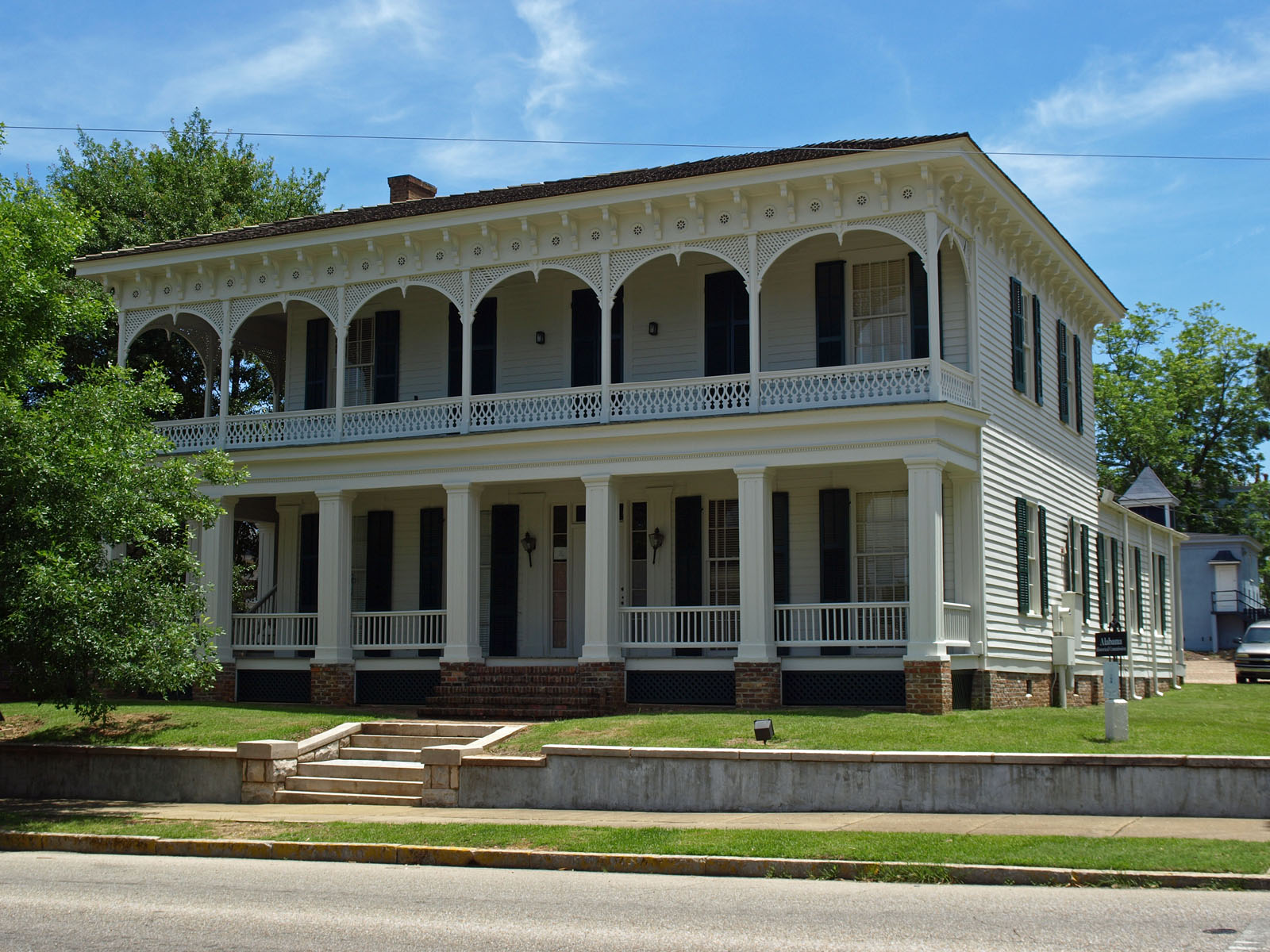
The Rice-Semple-Haardt House in Montgomery, Alabama.

Rice was married twice. He first married Amanda Butler in 1835. They resided in the Rice-Semple-Haardt House, which he built in the 1850s. Amanda Butler Rice died November 30, 1869, in Montgomery, Alabama and is buried with their son, Samuel Farrow Rice Jr. After Amanda's death, Samuel F. Rice Sr. married Mary Ellen Fitzgibbon on October 8, 1872. In addition to son Samuel, he fathered two daughters, Mrs Daisy Glaze and Marguerite Riley.

Rice died of heart disease on January 3, 1890, in Montgomery.

Political offices
Preceded by George Goldthwaite	Chief Justice of the Supreme Court of Alabama; 1856–1859	Succeeded by Abram Joseph Walker
