= Nellie Esther Goldthwaite =

American food chemist

- Other names: Nellie E. Goldthwaite; N.E. Goldthwaite
- Education: University of Chicago
- Scientific career
- Thesis: On substituted benzhydrol derivateves and bromcy-anacetic ether (1904)

Nellie Esther Goldthwaite (1868–1946) was an American food chemist known for her work on the active principle in the creation of jelly. In 1910 she was elected a fellow of the American Association for the Advancement of Science.

== Early life and education ==
Goldthwaite was born in Jamestown, New York. From 1884 until 1886 she attended Wellesley College. She graduated from the University of Michigan with a B.S. in 1894. She earned her Ph.D. from the University of Chicago in 1904.

== Career ==
Goldthwaite taught in public schools in Jamestown (1886 to 1889) and Chicago (1889 to 1891). From 1897 until 1905 she was the head of the chemistry department at Mount Holyoke College in Massachusetts. She then moved to the Rockefeller Institute where she worked as a research associate from 1906 until 1908. She worked at the University of Illinois from 1908 until 1915. From 1915 until 1916 she was the head of the home economics department at the University of New Hampshire. Starting in 1919 she worked at the Colorado Agricultural Experiment Station, retiring in 1925.

Goldthwaite was the undergraduate advisor of Frances Perkins, who went on to become the United States Secretary of Labor. Perkins attributed interacting with Goldthwaite as an incentive to get the most out of her college education.

Goldthwaite died in November of 1946.

== Work ==
Goldthwaite was a chemist primarily known for her work on the factors leading to successful jelly making. Her Ph.D. research was titled On substituted benzhydrol derivatives and bromcyanacetic ether, and was completed in 1904. In addition to publishing multiple editions of The Principles of Jelly-making, she wrote publications on her research into food science and home economics.

== Selected publications ==
- Goldthwaite, N. E. (1909-06-01). "Contribution on the Chemistry and Physics of Jelly-Making". Journal of Industrial & Engineering Chemistry. 1 (6): 333–340. doi:10.1021/ie50006a004. ISSN 0095-9014.
- Goldthwaite, N.E. (1910). "Effects of the Presence of Carbohydrates upon the Artificial Digestion of Casein". Journal of Biological Chemistry. 7 (2): 69–81. doi:10.1016/s0021-9258(18)91574-7. ISSN 0021-9258.
- Goldthwaite, Nellie Esther (1915). The Cooking of Carp. University of Illinois.
- Goldthwaite, N. E. (1925). Principles of making fruit-jellies. OCLC 1001523287.
- Goldthwaite, Nellie Esther (1925). Potatoes from the Housekeeper's Standpoint. Colorado Experiment Station.

== Honors and awards ==
Goldthwaite was elected a fellow of the American Association for the Advancement of Science in 1910.
