= Henry Goldthwaite =

American judge (1802–1847)

Associate Justice of the Supreme Court of Alabama
- In office 1837 – October 19, 1847

Personal details
- Born: Henry Barnes Goldthwaite; April 10, 1802 Boston, Massachusetts, U.S.
- Died: October 19, 1847 (aged 45) Mobile, Alabama, U.S.
- Cause of death: Yellow fever
- Resting place: Magnolia Cemetery, Mobile, Alabama, U.S.
- Party: Democratic
- Relatives: George Goldthwaite (brother)
- Profession: Politician

Henry Barnes Goldthwaite (April 10, 1802 – October 19, 1847) was a justice of the Supreme Court of Alabama, having been appointed in 1837 and reelected until his death in 1847.

Born in Boston, Massachusetts, Goldthwaite ran for Congress as a Democrat in 1842, but was defeated by the incumbent, James Dellet. He was the brother of Senator George Goldthwaite.

In 1843, Goldthwaite resigned to run for Congress, but was defeated in the general election. He then "became a candidate for his previous place on the Court, defeating Judge Clay before the General Assembly".

Goldthwaite died in Mobile, Alabama, of yellow fever, at the age of 45, and was buried at Magnolia Cemetery.
