= Frank W. Applebee =

American painter

Frank Woodberry Applebee
- Born: 1902; Boston, Massachusetts, U.S.
- Died: 1988 (aged 85–86)
- Education: Massachusetts College of Art and Design
- Occupations: Painter, educator

Frank Woodberry Applebee (1902–1988) was an American painter and educator. He was a co-founder of the Dixie Art Colony and the head of the art department at Auburn University.

== Early life ==
Frank Woodberry Applebee was born in Boston, Massachusetts. He studied art at the Massachusetts College of Art and Design.

== Career ==
Applebee was a co-founder of the Dixie Art Colony in Alabama in 1933. By 1937, he was an instructor at the colony.

Applebee was subsequently the head of the art department at Alabama Polytechnic Institute, later known as Auburn University. He helped pick the permanent collection of the Jule Collins Smith Museum of Fine Art. He became professor emeritus in 1969.

Applebee was a regionalist painter. He was elected as one of five vice presidents of the Alabama Art League in 1947. Two years later, in 1949, he won a prize from the league at the Montgomery Museum of Fine Arts.

== Death ==
Applebee died in 1988.
