= Alfred Goldthwaite =

American lawyer and politician

Alfred Witherspoon Goldthwaite (August 12, 1921 - ?) was a lawyer, state legislator, and political party leader in Alabama. He worked as an attorney in Montgomery, Alabama.

He was the son of Archibald Campbell Goldthwaite and Mary (Arrington) Goldthwaite. He was the grandson of Joseph Graham Goldthwaite and Ella (Willis) Goldthwaite of Galveston.

He served as state chairman of the Alabama Republican Party. He was married to Evelyn Adams Goldthwaite.

== See also ==
- Goldthwaite (surname)
