= Dixie Art Colony =

American art colony

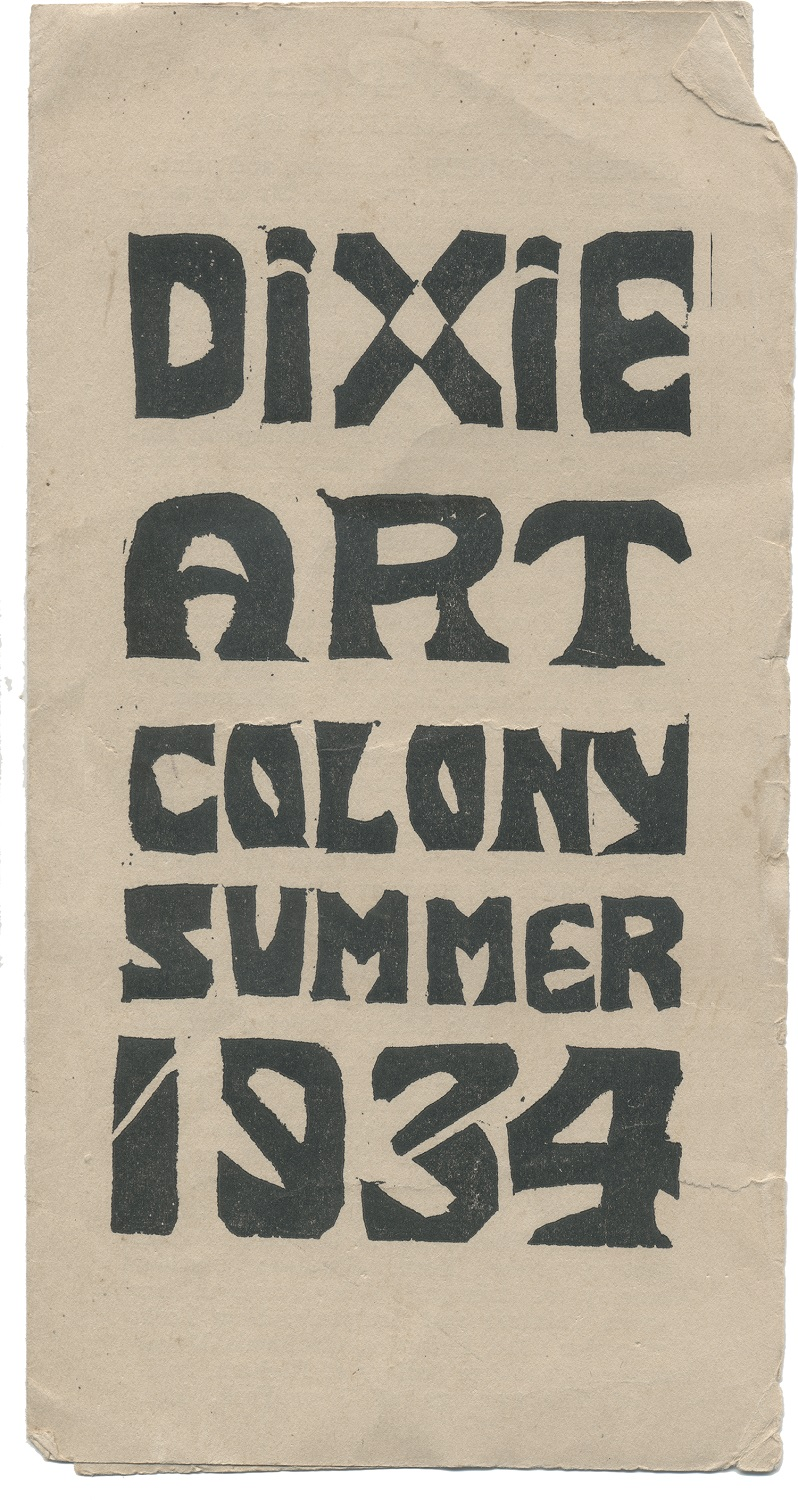
Brochure of the Dixie Art Colony 1934

The Dixie Art Colony was an art colony in Alabama from 1933 to 1948.

== History ==
The Dixie Art Colony was established by John Kelly Fitzpatrick (1888–1953), Sallie B. Carmichael and her daughter Warree Carmichael LeBron in 1933. The idea was to establish an artist colony to paint and train burgeoning artists in the South.

From 1937, they met at Poka-Hutchi, a small cabin on Lake Jordan. Later, Frank W. Applebee, the Chair of the School of Art and Architecture at Auburn University and a painter, joined the colony, as did Genevieve Southerland, Anne Goldthwaite and Lamar Dodd (1909–1996).

The colony last met in 1948.

Dixie Art Colony Foundation was founded in 2015 to reintroduce the art world to Kelly Fitzpatrick and Poka-Hutchi.
