= Anne Goldthwaite =

American artist and advocate of women's rights (1869–1944)

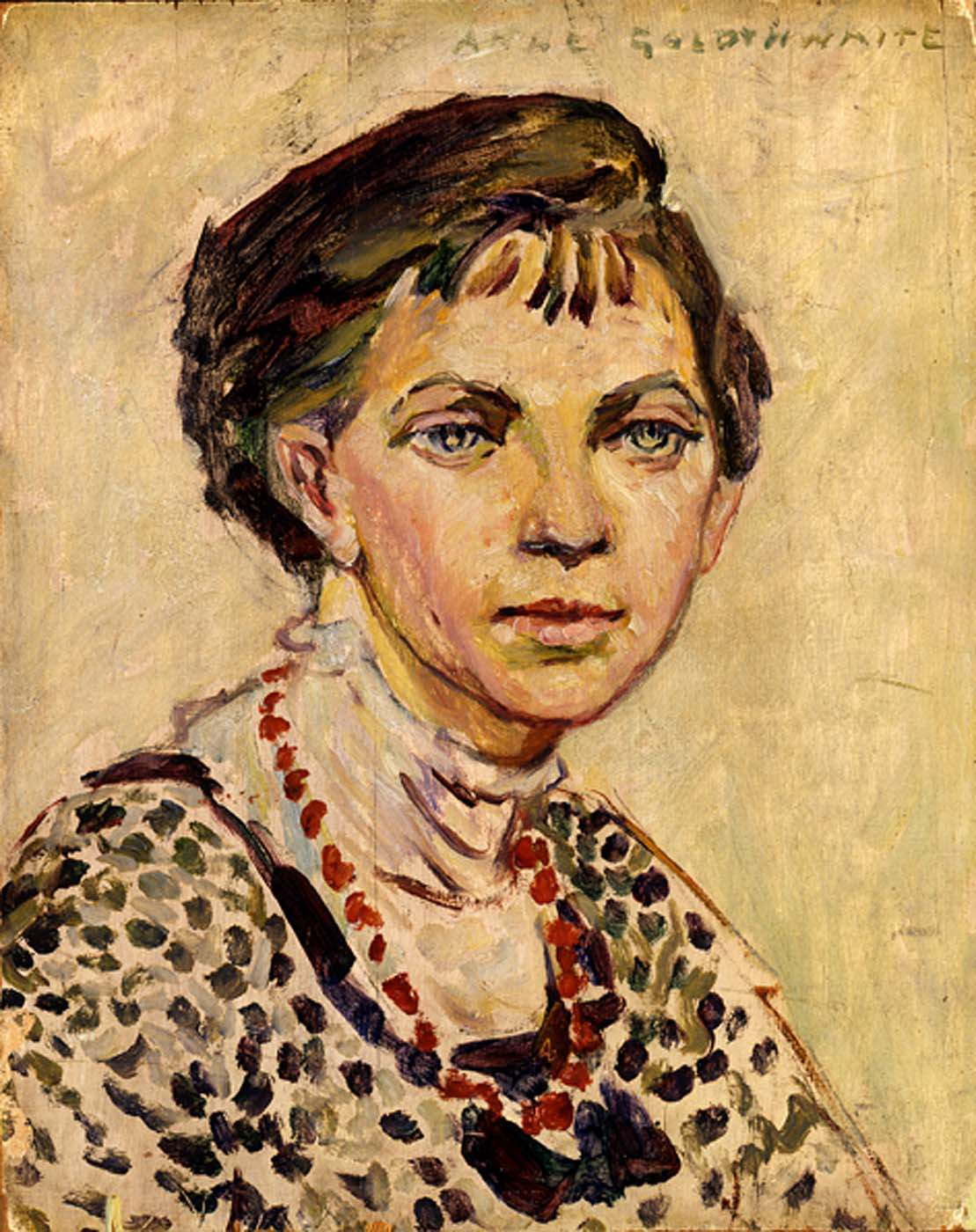
- Self-portrait, c. 1906-1913
- Born: June 28, 1869; Montgomery, Alabama, U.S.
- Died: January 29, 1944 (aged 74); New York, U.S.
- Education: National Academy of Design
- Known for: Portrayal of Southerners

Anne Goldthwaite (June 28, 1869 – January 29, 1944) was an American painter and printmaker and an advocate of women's rights and equal rights. Goldthwaite studied art in New York City. She then moved to Paris where she studied modern art, including Fauvism and Cubism, and became a member of a circle that included Gertrude Stein, Henri Matisse, and Pablo Picasso. She was a member of a group of artists that called themselves Académie Moderne and held annual exhibitions.

Back in the United States, she exhibited, along with other modern artists like Mary Cassatt, Vincent Van Gogh, Edgar Degas, and Claude Monet at the 1913 New York Armory Show. She set up residence in New York City and spent the summers with family in Montgomery, Alabama. She taught at Art Students League of New York for 23 years and during the summers, she was an instructor at the Dixie Art Colony. After returning from Paris, she accepted commissions for works of art and exhibited her paintings in New York City.

She became known in the South for her scenes of post-slavery rural African American life. She was an organizer for the 1915 Exhibition of Painting and Sculpture by Women Artists for the Benefit of the Woman Suffrage Campaign and created works of art for the event.

== Early life ==
Anne Wilson Goldthwaite was born in Montgomery, Alabama, on June 28, 1869. Her father, Richard W. Goldthwaite, was an artillery captain for the Confederacy during the Civil War. He was the son of Alabama senator George Goldthwaite. Her family moved to Dallas, Texas and remained there for the majority of her childhood while her father looked for work. Upon the death of her parents, Goldthwaite and her two sisters returned to Alabama to be cared for by various family members. Her aunt presented her to society as a promising young debutante who was destined to become a southern belle. This changed after her fiancé was killed in a duel. While visiting Goldthwaite in Alabama, her uncle Henry Goldthwaite was impressed by her drawing and painting skills. To lift her spirits, he offered to support her financially for up to ten years if she relocated to New York City to study art. Goldthwaite arrived in New York around 1898 and enrolled at the National Academy of Design, where she studied etching with Charles Frederick William Mielatz and painting with Walter Shirlaw.

== Career ==
In 1906, Anne Goldthwaite traveled to Paris, where she lived at the American Girls' Club and explored her interest in the early modern painting styles of Fauvism and Cubism. She met Gertrude Stein while sketching in the Luxembourg Gardens. According to Charlotte Rubinstein in American Women Artists, Goldthwaite explained that Stein "looked something like an immense dark brown egg. She wore, wrapped tight around her, a brown kimono-like garment and a large flat black hat, and stood on feet covered with wide sandals." Stein invited Goldthwaite to visit her home, yet she hesitated due to Stein's "shabby" appearance. But Goldthwaite soon realized Stein's presence in the art world when encountering the extensive contemporary painting collection hung on the walls of her apartment. Meeting one of the most influential pre-war avant-garde persons of the time gave Goldthwaite an opportunity to join the art circle of Henri Matisse and Pablo Picasso. She later said, "Fate gave me several years in Paris at the most exciting time: during the great reconstruction from art to modern art." During her time in Paris, Goldthwaite drifted to different studios in an attempt to find the right teacher. After much difficulty, she joined a small group of young artists who worked at 86 Notre Dame des Champs. Their work was periodically critiqued by Charles Guerin, a disciple of Cézanne. The group called themselves the Académie Moderne and held an exhibition each spring.

Goldthwaite returned to America and contributed to the introduction of European Modernism in the 1913 New York Armory Show. She showed The Church on the Hill (1910–11) at the landmark exhibition, alongside renown artists Mary Cassatt, Vincent Van Gogh, Edgar Degas, Claude Monet, and others. At the exhibition, Goldthwaite met fellow artist Katherine Dreier, who became a lifelong friend.

In 1915, she began to establish a consistent working schedule consisting of nine months in New York followed by the summer spent with family in Montgomery, Alabama. She began painting lovingly rendered portraits of her friends and family, including her sister Lucy, painter Rico Lebrun, and her first New York dealer Joseph Brummer. Many of her subjects were fellow women artists. Katherine Dreier, a suffragist and cofounder of the organization Société Anonyme, future first lady and Art Students League pupil Ellen Axson Wilson, and portraitist and future director of the Montgomery Museum of Fine Arts Frances Greene Nix were all sitters for Goldthwaite.

Goldthwaite later became known as one of the South's most important regional artists for her scenes of post-slave rural African American life. She documented the lifestyle with oil paintings, watercolors, and etchings. The Section of Painting and Sculpture awarded her two commissioned murals in Alabama for her lifelong exploration of this subject. She completed The Letter Box in Atmore, Alabama in 1937 and The Road to Muskegee in Tuskegee, Alabama in 1939.

Goldthwaite spent 23 years as a beloved teacher at the Art Students League of New York. She was also an active member of several artist organizations such as the New York Society of Women Artists, where she was appointed president in 1937–1938. During her summers in Alabama, Goldthwaite advised students at the Dixie Art Colony.

Goldthwaite's work was brought to Edith Halpert, who focused on showing the work of American Modernists. Anne was given several one-woman shows in her Downtown Gallery in New York. From 1922 until 1944, she taught and took commissions from her residence in New York. Her work was also part of the painting event in the art competition at the 1932 Summer Olympics.

== Activism ==
Anne Goldthwaite was an advocate of equal rights and women's rights. She was actively involved in woman's groups, and fought for equality in the South for ethnic minorities. Her work as an activist and artist intersected on several occasions, including the 1915 Exhibition of Painting and Sculpture by Women Artists for the Benefit of the Woman Suffrage Campaign, which she co-organized, and the unfurling of a suffrage banner of her own design at a 1916 New York Giants baseball game.

In a 1934 radio interview, Goldthwaite offered her perspective on the work of women artists, observing: “the best praise that women have been able to command until now is to have it said that she paints like a man. But that women have a valid place as women artists is both obvious and logical. . . . We want to speak to . . . an audience that asks simply—is it good, not—was it done by a woman.”

== Later life ==
On January 29, 1944, Anne Goldthwaite died in New York after a long illness. Her funeral service and burial took place in Montgomery, Alabama.

== Works ==
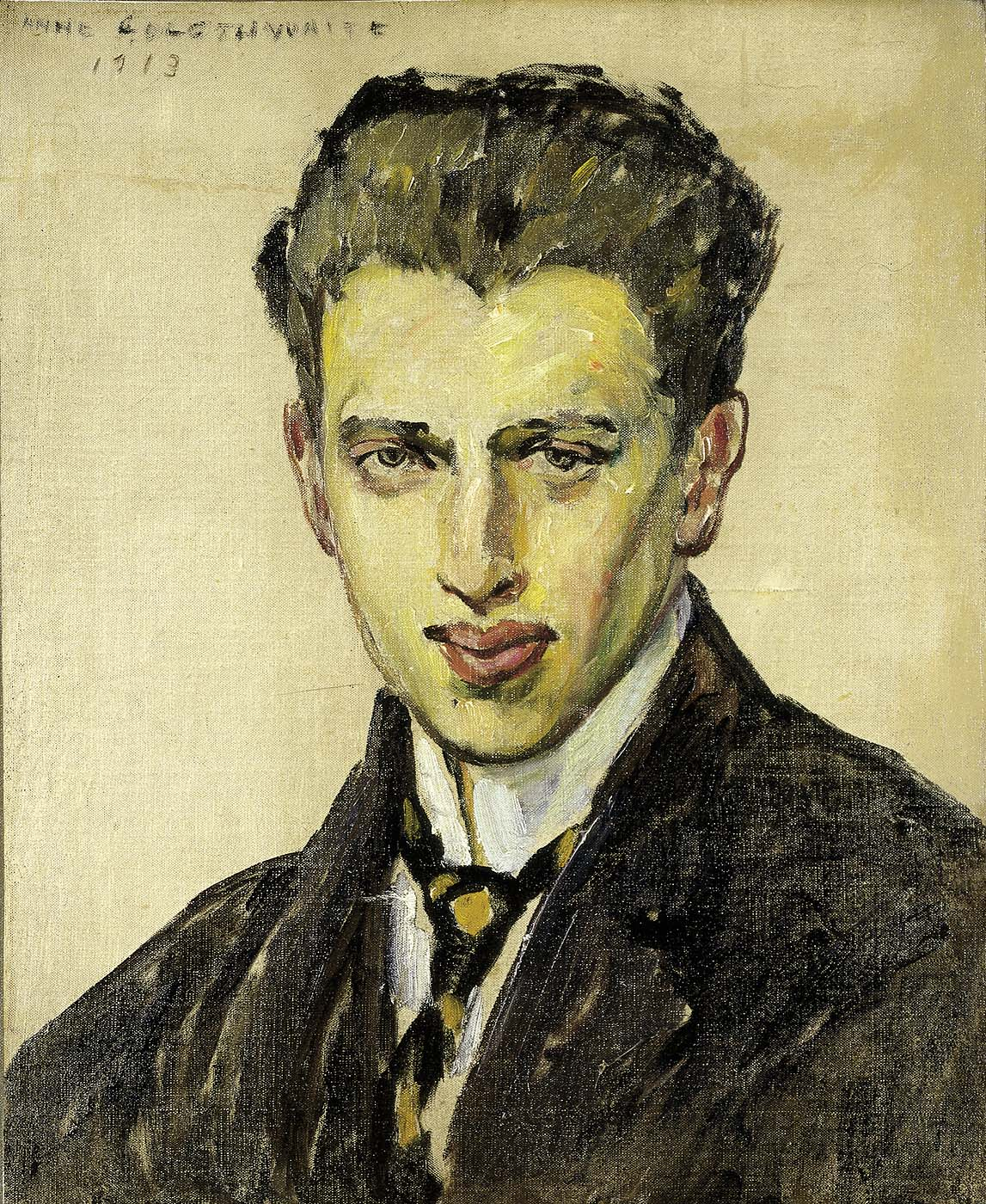
Anne Goldthwaite, Portrait of a Young Man, 1913, Smithsonian American Art Museum

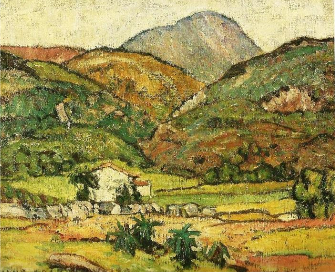
The Church on the Hill, 1913 Armory Show

- A Window at Night, oil on canvas, c. 1933, Metropolitan Museum of Art
- Avenue of the Allies - 5th Avenue, 1918, etching, 1918, Smithsonian American Art Museum
- Bulrushes (No. 1), etching, c. 1895, Montgomery Museum of Fine Arts
- Bulrushes (No. 2), etching, c. 1895, Montgomery Museum of Fine Arts
- Business Section of Boquehomo, etching, not dated, Smithsonian American Art Museum
- Cabin in Alabama, oil on canvas, c. 1915-1925, Smithsonian American Art Museum
- Chapelle du Val de Grâce (No.1), etching, c. 1907, Montgomery Museum of Fine Arts
- Cow and Calf, drypoint, c. 1928, Cleveland Museum of Art
- East Tenth Street (Anne at the Window), etching and drypoint, c. 1928, Cleveland Museum of Art
- Garden Gate, Near Ascain #7, oil on canvas, 1912, Metropolitan Museum
- Grazing, watercolor and black chalk on paper, Metropolitan Museum of Art
- Head of a Negress, Rachel, glazed terracotta sculpture, c. 1929, Metropolitan Museum of Art
- Her Daughter, lithograph, c. 1934, Smithsonian American Art Museum
- Horse and Rider, lithograph, c. 1936, Smithsonian American Art Museum
- Mending (No. 3), lithograph, c. 1936, Smithsonian American Art Museum
- Negro Woman at a Fountain, etching, c. 1920, Smithsonian American Art Museum
- At Montmartre (also called New Year's Night - Cafe Versaille), etching, c. 1910, Smithsonian American Art Museum
- New York Harbor, etching, c. 1915, Cleveland Museum of Art
- Night Series: Dog Baying at the Moon, lithograph, c. 1930, Cleveland Museum of Art
- Nude Reading (No. 1), lithograph, c. 1933, Smithsonian American Art Museum
- October in France, etching, c. 1907, Montgomery Museum of Fine Arts
- On the Road to Fontainebleau, etching and drypoint, c. 1907, Syracuse Museum of Fine Arts
- Pont Neuf, Paris, etching, c. 1908, The Downtown Gallery, New York, New York
- Pool Room, lithograph, c. 1935, Smithsonian American Art Museum
- Polo (No. 1), etching, c. 1924, Cleveland Museum of Art
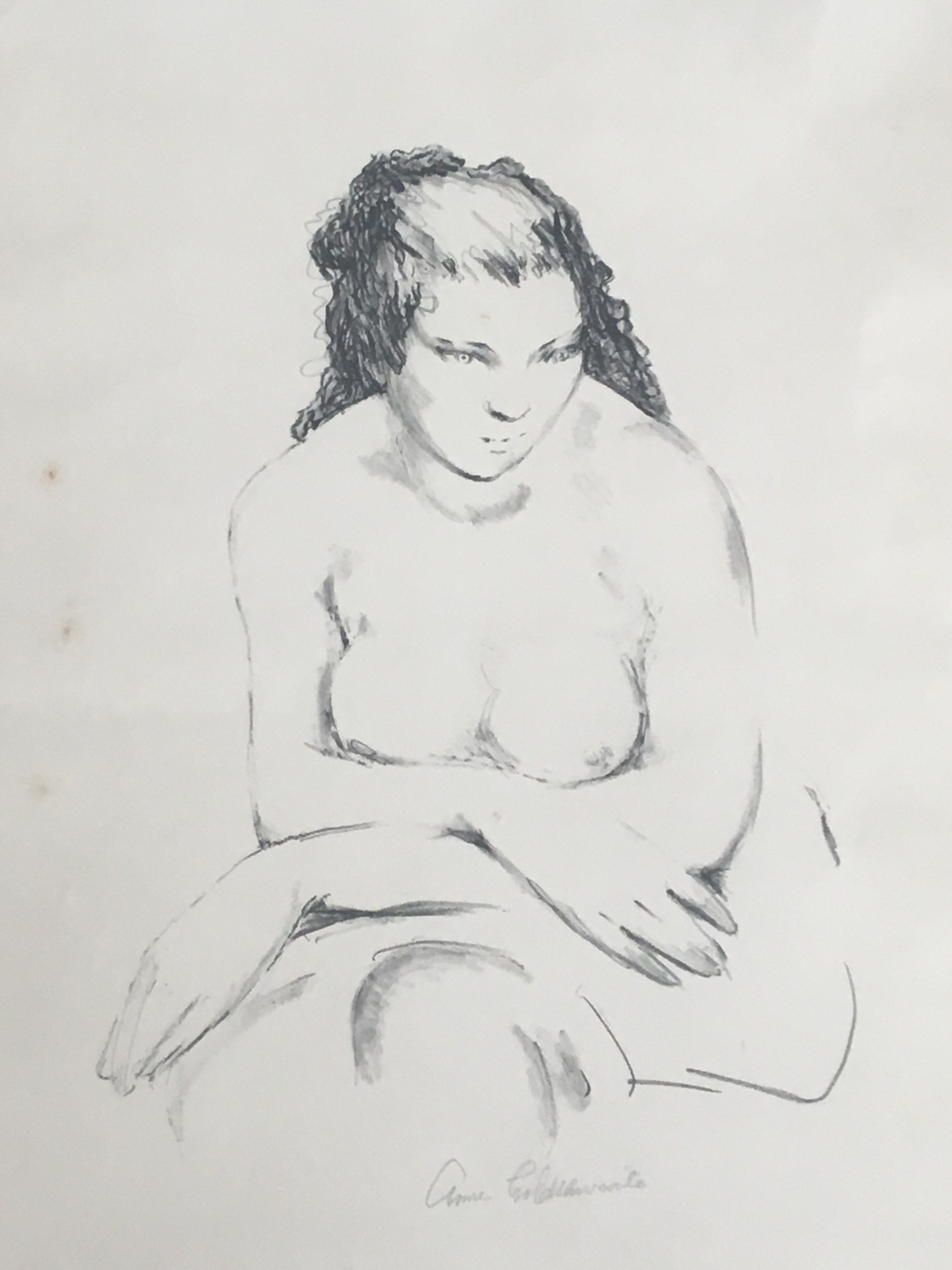
  Selma (No. 1), lithograph c. 1933 by Anne Goldthwaite
- Portrait of a Young Man, oil on canvas, 1913, Smithsonian American Art Museum
- Quai Votaire (Also known as Bookstalls Along the Seine), etching, c. 1908, Syracuse Museum of Fine Arts
- Saturday (also called Saturday in Alabama), etching, c.1920, Smithsonian American Art Museum
- Self-Portrait, oil on wood mounted on fiber, c. 1906-1913, Smithsonian American Art Museum
- Selma (No. 1), lithograph, c. 1933, Cleveland Museum of Art
- Southern Street, watercolor and graphite on paper, Metropolitan Museum of Art
- Street Fiddler (also called The Violin), lithograph, c. 1934, Smithsonian American Art Museum
- St. Sulpice, Paris, etching, c. 1908, Montgomery Museum of Fine Arts
- The Green Sofa, oil on canvas, c. 1930-1940, Metropolitan Museum of Art
- The Jaehne House, etching, c. 1922, Cleveland Museum of Art
- The Pantheon, etching, c. 1908, Montgomery Museum of Fine Arts
- Tulips, Cleveland Museum of Art
- Two Black Crows, lithograph, not dated, Smithsonian American Art Museum
- Waterhole, lithograph, c. 1936, Smithsonian American Art Museum
- Ironing, (also called Young Laundress), lithograph, c. 1931, Smithsonian American Art Museum
- Young Woman in White, oil on canvas, c. 1930s, Cleveland Museum of Art
- White Mules on a Bridge, oil on canvas, c. 1930-1940, Metropolitan Museum of Art

== Sources ==
- Breeskin, Adelyn Dohme (1982). Anne Goldthwaite : a catalogue raisonné of the graphic work. Montgomery, Ala.: Montgomery Museum of Fine Arts. ISBN 0-89280-019-4. OCLC 8409707.
