= Genevieve Southerland =

American painter

- Died: June 30, 1953; Mobile, Alabama
- Occupation: Painter

Genevieve Southerland (died June 30, 1953) was an American painter. She was a member of the Dixie Art Colony, and she established the Coden Art Colony in 1950. She was the vice president of the Alabama Art League and the Water Color Society of Alabama. Her work can be found in the permanent collection of the Montgomery Museum of Fine Arts.
