= George Goldthwaite =

Democratic U.S. Senator from Alabama

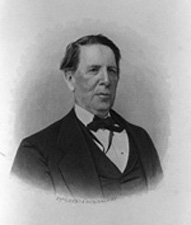

United States Senator from Alabama
- In office March 4, 1871 – March 3, 1877
- Preceded by: Willard Warner
- Succeeded by: John T. Morgan

Personal details
- Born: December 10, 1810 Boston, Massachusetts
- Died: March 18, 1879 (aged 68) Tuscaloosa, Alabama
- Party: Democratic
- Relations: George G. Siebels, Jr. (great-grandson) Alfred Goldthwaite; Anne Goldthwaite (granddaughter) Lucy Goldthwaite (granddaughter)

George Goldthwaite (December 10, 1809 – March 16, 1879) was an Alabama Supreme Court justice and U.S. senator for Alabama. He served in the Senate from March 4, 1871, to March 3, 1877, and did not run for reelection.

He was a native of Boston, Massachusetts. He succeeded William P. Chilton as Chief Justice of the Supreme Court of Alabama in 1856. State legislators from Alabama wrote to the U.S. Senate in protest of his election stating he did not receive a majority of the votes from state legislators and was therefore not elected legitimately. He was seated and remained in office.

A great-grandson, George G. Siebels, Jr., was a 20th-century mayor of Birmingham and a member of the Alabama House of Representatives. Another descendant, Alfred Goldthwaite, was a state representative from Montgomery and a state chairman of the Alabama Republican Party.

In 1853 he ruled that a freed woman in Ohio could be returned so slavery to satisfy the debts of her former owner but that her son could not.

U.S. Senate
Preceded by Willard Warner	U.S. senator (Class 2) from Alabama; 1871–1877; Served alongside: George E. Spencer	Succeeded by John T. Morgan
Legal offices
Preceded by William P. Chilton	Chief Justice of the Supreme Court of Alabama; 1856	Succeeded by Samuel F. Rice
