= William M. Byrd =

American judge (1819–1874)

William McKendree Byrd (December 1, 1819 – September 24, 1874) was a justice of the Supreme Court of Alabama from 1866 to 1867.

== Education and career ==
He attended Mississippi College and graduated from Alabama's LaGrange College in 1838. He read law in Holly Springs, Mississippi to gain admission to the bar. He moved to Alabama and was admitted to the bar in 1841.

After the American Civil War, the Alabama legislature convened and elected Supreme Court members effective January 1, 1866. They were A.J. Walker, William M. Byrd, and Thomas J. Judge.

He was removed from office in 1868 due to Reconstruction legislation at the federal level.

== Personal life and death ==
Byrd married Mariah H. Massie, with whom he had four children. He died in a train wreck.

Political offices
| Preceded by Newly reorganized court | Justice of the Supreme Court of Alabama; 1863–1867 | Succeeded by Newly reorganized court |
