= Oscar Adams =

Oscar Adams may refer to:

- Oscar Fay Adams (1855–1919), an American editor and author
- Oscar S. Adams (1874–1962), an American mathematician and geodesist who was an expert on map projections
- Oscar W. Adams Sr. (1882–1946), an American journalist and publisher who published the Birmingham Reporter
- Oscar W. Adams Jr. (1925–1997), the first African-American Alabama Supreme Court justice
- Oscar Adams (footballer) (born 2002), Australian rules footballer

== See also ==
- Óscar Eyraud Adams (c. 1986 – 2020), a Mexican indigenous activist who campaigned for water rights in Baja California
