= Gulfcrest, Alabama =

- Census-designated place
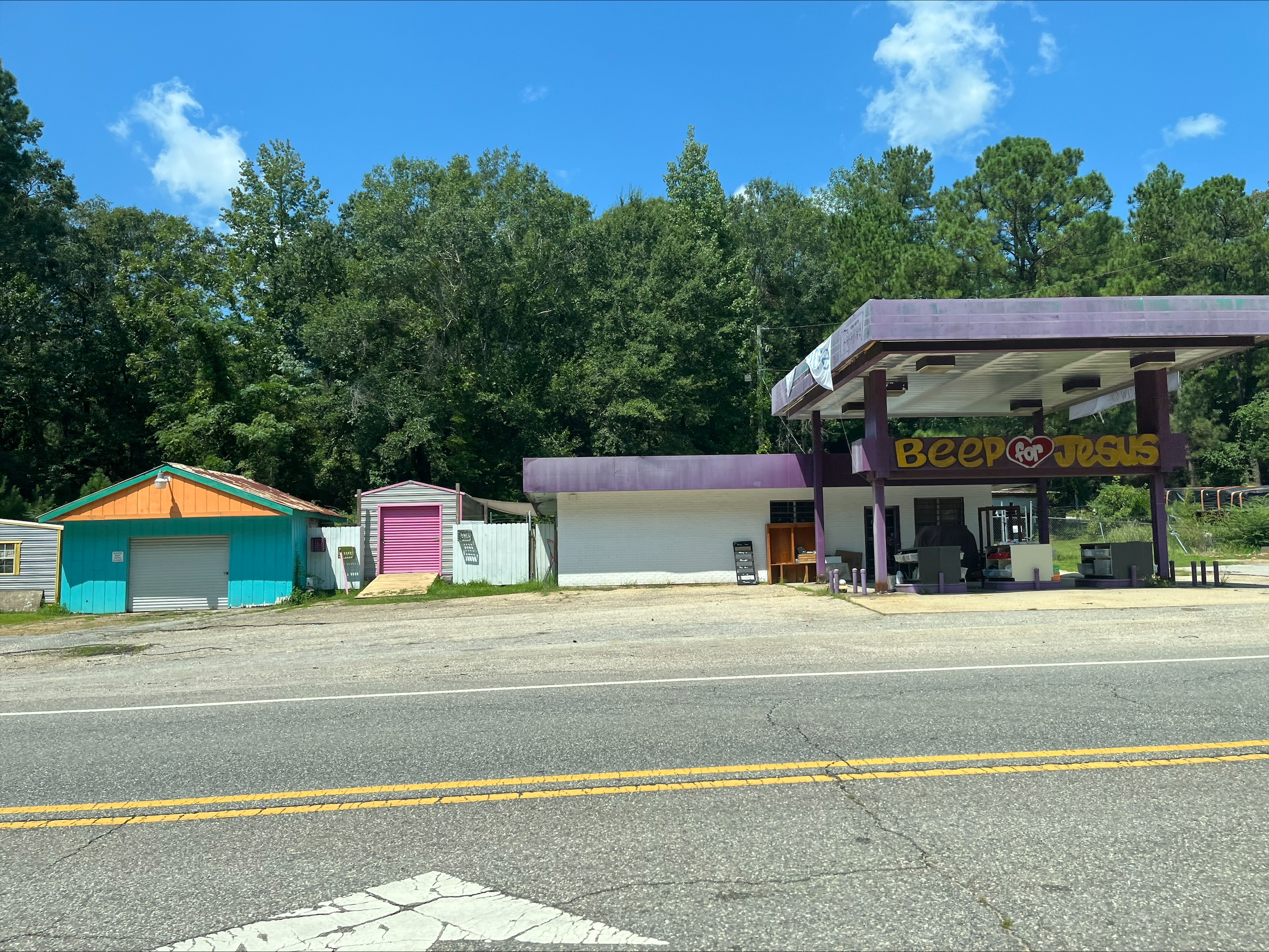
- Store in Gulfcrest

- Location in Mobile County, Alabama
- Coordinates: 30°59′44″N 88°14′42″W
- Country: United States
- State: Alabama
- County: Mobile

Area
  - Total: 1.52 sq mi (3.93 km^{2})
  - Land: 1.51 sq mi (3.92 km^{2})
  - Water: 0.0039 sq mi (0.01 km^{2})
- Elevation: 148 ft (45 m)

Population (2020)
  - Total: 142
  - Density: 93.8/sq mi (36.21/km^{2})
- Time zone: UTC-6 (Central (CST))
  - Summer (DST): UTC-5 (CDT)
- Area code: 251
- GNIS feature ID: 2628592
- FIPS code: 01-32248

Gulfcrest is a census-designated place and unincorporated community in Mobile County, Alabama, United States. Its population was 142 as of the 2020 census.

== Geography ==
Gulfcrest is in northern Mobile County, along U.S. Route 45, which leads southeast 26 miles (42 km) to Mobile and north 6 miles (10 km) to Citronelle.

According to the U.S. Census Bureau, Gulfcrest has a total area of 1.5 square miles (3.9 km^{2}), of which 0.003 square miles (0.0078 km^{2}), or 0.20%, are water. Chickasaw Creek, a south-flowing tributary of the Mobile River, forms the eastern boundary of the Gulfcrest CDP.

== Demographics ==
Historical population
| Census | Pop. | Note | %± |
|---|---|---|---|
| 2010 | 161 | | — |
| 2020 | 142 | | −11.8% |
U.S. Decennial Census

Gulfcrest was listed as a census designated place in the 2010 U.S. census.

Gulfcrest CDP, Alabama – Racial and ethnic composition Note: the US Census treats Hispanic/Latino as an ethnic category. This table excludes Latinos from the racial categories and assigns them to a separate category. Hispanics/Latinos may be of any race.
| Race / Ethnicity (NH = Non-Hispanic) | Pop 2010 | Pop 2020 | % 2010 | % 2020 |
|---|---|---|---|---|
| White alone (NH) | 140 | 123 | 86.96% | 86.62% |
| Black or African American alone (NH) | 5 | 5 | 3.11% | 3.52% |
| Native American or Alaska Native alone (NH) | 9 | 0 | 5.59% | 0.00% |
| Asian alone (NH) | 0 | 0 | 0.00% | 0.00% |
| Native Hawaiian or Pacific Islander alone (NH) | 0 | 0 | 0.00% | 0.00% |
| Other race alone (NH) | 0 | 0 | 0.00% | 0.00% |
| Mixed race or Multiracial (NH) | 5 | 11 | 3.11% | 7.75% |
| Hispanic or Latino (any race) | 2 | 3 | 1.24% | 2.11% |
| Total | 161 | 142 | 100.00% | 100.00% |

== Notable people ==
- Oscar W. Adams Sr., publisher of the Birmingham Reporter and father of Alabama Supreme Court justice Oscar W. Adams Jr.

== Education ==
Residents are zoned to Mobile County Public School System campuses. Residents are zoned to McDavid-Jones Elementary School (K-5), Lott Middle School (6-8), and Citronelle High School (9-12).
