= West End High School (Birmingham, Alabama) =

Location
- 1840 Pearson Ave; Birmingham, Alabama 35211; United States; 33°29′06″N 86°52′01″W

Information
- Type: Public
- Established: 1930
- Closed: 2008
- School district: Birmingham City Schools
- Mascot: Lion

West End High School was a public high school in the Birmingham City Schools system of Birmingham, Alabama. The school's red-brick building, completed in 1930, was a collaboration between noted local architects Warren, Knight and Davis and David O. Whilldin.

In 1963, a boycott of the school by white students took place after two African-American students tried to register for classes. Those who boycotted shouted "Two, four, six, eight, we don't want to integrate." The boycott ended in a week.

On June 27, 1982, West End alumnus and shuttle pilot Henry W. Hartsfield carried a West End banner into orbit aboard the Space Shuttle Columbia.

Under a consolidation plan approved by the Birmingham Board of Education in February 2008, West End High School was closed during the summer of 2008 with students transferring to Wenonah High School, A. H. Parker High School and Jackson-Olin High School. The closing was marked by a ceremony on June 7 with a parade, pep rally, picnic and alumni basketball game. Demolition of the school building began in March 2009.

Alumni groups are active. Many classes meet annually, albeit informally. One distinguished group of alumni is known as The West End Yacht Club, which is a group of men graduated in 1968. The West End Yacht Club's members are Don Bevill, Lee Crapet, Tom Browne and James Musgrove, local executives, and an attorney, Wayne Morse, who took West End memorabilia with him when he appeared before the Supreme Court of the United States. The West End Yacht Club meets quarterly.

== Athletics ==
West End High School was well known in the Birmingham area for its basketball program. The Lions won two straight class 6A State titles in the 1996–97 and 1997-98 school years. West End was also the last Birmingham City School to compete in the class 6A title game in American football during the 1993-94 school year until Wenonah High School and Ramsay High School advanced to the 5A and 6A state championship game in 2016 with Ramsay winning the 6A state championship and Wenonah earning 5A state runner-up. The Lions finished 13-2 that year and they were led by a defense dubbed the "dog pound." From 1996-98, the Lions baseball team won Birmingham-metro area championship under Coach Jimmy Holifield.

== Notable alumni ==
- Earl Bennett, American football wide receiver for the Chicago Bears
- Pernell Davis, former American football defensive tackle
- Henry Hartsfield (1933–2014), former NASA astronaut
- Bubba Church, Former MLB pitcher
- Gus Niarhos, Former MLB player (New York Yankees, Chicago White Sox, Boston Red Sox, Philadelphia Phillies)
- Ann Waldron (1924–2010), author.
- Travis McNeal, Class of 1985. NFL Tight End For Seattle Seahawks/LA Rams
- Tariq Nasheed (Historian)
