= Eyraud =

Eyraud is a surname. Notable people with the surname include:

- Achille Eyraud (1821–1882), French author
- Eugène Eyraud (1820–1868), lay friar
- Jacques-Henri Eyraud (born 1968), French businessman
- Marc Eyraud (1924–2005), French film actor
- Óscar Eyraud Adams (c. 1986– 2020), Mexican indigenous activist
