= Frank H. Threatt =

American politician

Frank H. Threatt (died October 8, 1931) was a Methodist minister, politician, and public office holder in Alabama.

He served in the Alabama legislature from 1872 to 1874 representing Marengo County and was a congressional candidate from the First District in 1892 . He also held appointed office.

He was a delegate to the 1874 Alabama Equal Rights Convention. He was a delegate to the Republican National Convention in 1876.

He campaigned for a congressional seat in 1880. Oscar W. Adams Jr. was his great-grandson.

He lived in Demopolis.
