= Jimmy Sidle =

American gridiron football player (1942–1999)

No. 24, 38, 77
- Position: Running back

Personal information
- Born: February 7, 1942; Birmingham, Alabama, U.S.
- Died: November 14, 1999 (aged 57); Montgomery, Alabama, U.S.
- Listed height: 6 ft 2 in (1.88 m)
- Listed weight: 215 lb (98 kg)

Career information
- High school: Banks (Birmingham)
- College: Auburn (1961-1964)
- NFL draft: 1965: 4th round, 47th overall pick
- AFL draft: 1965: 9th round, 68th overall pick

Career history
- Dallas Cowboys (1965)*; Atlanta Falcons (1966); BC Lions (1967–1968)
- * Offseason or practice squad member only

Awards and highlights
- First-team All-American (1963); SEC Player of the Year (1963); First-team All-SEC (1963)

Career NFL statistics
- Rushing yards: 12
- Receptions: 1
- Receiving yards: 16
- Stats at Pro Football Reference

James Corbin Sidle (February 7, 1942 – November 14, 1999) was an American professional football player who was a running back in the National Football League (NFL) for the Atlanta Falcons. He played college football for the Auburn Tigers and was selected by the Dallas Cowboys in the fourth round of the 1965 NFL draft.

== Early life ==
Sidle attended Sylacauga High School, before transferring after his sophomore season to L. Frazier Banks High School, where as a quarterback he received All-State and All-American honors. He also practiced basketball and won the state championship in the hurdles.

He accepted a football scholarship from Auburn University, where the team employed a run oriented offense. In 1963, as the starting quarterback he finished second in the nation in rushing behind Dave Casinelli and was named first-team All-American, after leading his team to a No. 5 ranking (9-1 record) and losing 7-13 to Nebraska in the 1964 Orange Bowl. He registered 1,006 rushing yards, 10 rushing touchdowns, 706 passing yards and 5 passing touchdowns.

Although he was a quarterback, he still was featured on the cover of the September 21, 1964 edition of the Sports Illustrated magazine, under the title: "The Year of the Running Back". That year his team was one of the favorites to win the National Championship, but he tore the rotator cuff in his right shoulder in the season opener, playing against the University of Houston. He still played in all 10 games that season after being switched to halfback, but the team finished with a 6-4 record. He posted 303 rushing yards, 2 rushing touchdowns, 262 passing yards, 54 receiving yards and one receiving touchdown.

In 1999, he was inducted into Auburn's Tiger Trail, a walk of fame honoring former school greats. In 2002, he was inducted in the Alabama Sports Hall of Fame.

== Professional career ==
=== Dallas Cowboys ===
Sidle was selected by the Dallas Cowboys in the fourth round (47th overall) of the 1965 NFL draft and by the New York Jets in the ninth round (68th overall) of the 1965 AFL draft. He signed with the Cowboys and was switched to fullback, but he was lost for the year in training camp, after re-injuring in July the same shoulder he hurt in college. His rights were sold to the expansion team Atlanta Falcons on August 31, 1966.

=== Atlanta Falcons ===
In 1966, the Atlanta Falcons first used him at running back, before switching him to tight end. He was waived on September 11 and signed to the taxi squad. He was promoted to the active roster on October 7.

=== BC Lions ===
In 1967, he signed with the BC Lions of the Canadian Football League, where he played as a tight end for 2 seasons.

== Personal life ==
Sidle died of heart failure on November 14, 1999, after being hospitalized with pneumonia.
