= Wenonah High School =

Coordinates: 33.452339°N 86.886063°W

Location
- 2800 Wilson Road SW; Birmingham, Alabama 35221; United States

Information
- School type: Public
- Motto: Where champions are made
- Established: 1948 (78 years ago)
- School district: Birmingham City Schools
- CEEB code: 010425
- Principal: Jerry Davenport.
- Faculty: 48
- Teaching staff: 37.60 (on an FTE basis)
- Grades: 9-12
- Enrollment: 669 (2023-2024)
- Student to teacher ratio: 17.79
- Colors: White and gold
- Athletics: AHSAA Class 5A
- Nickname: Dragons
- Feeder schools: Arrington Middle School Jones Valley Middle School
- Website: www.bhamcityschools.org/o/whs

Wenonah High School is a four-year public high school in Birmingham, Alabama. It is one of seven high schools in the Birmingham City School System. School colors are Old gold and white. The mascot is the Dragon. Wenonah also competes in Alabama High School Athletic Association (AHSAA) Class 4A athletics.

== Student Profile ==
Enrollment in grades 9-12 for the 2013-14 school year is 782 students. 94% of students are African-American and roughly 85% of students qualify for free or reduced price lunch.

Wenonah has a graduation rate of 82%. Approximately 82% of its students meet or exceed proficiency standards in mathematics, and 77% meet or exceed standards in reading. The average ACT score for Wenonah students is 18.

== History ==
After Wenonah School was destroyed by fire in 1944, the Tennessee Coal & Iron (TCI) Company donated a parcel of land consisting of approximately 16 acres (6.5 ha) to be used for a new elementary and high school. Construction began in late 1946, and in the fall of 1947, students in grades 8-12 from Riley Elementary School and Galilee, Mt. Olive and Bryant Chapel AME Churches began classes in Wenonah Elementary School's first floor while construction on the second floor and high school was being completed.

The high school was built at a cost of $500,000 and included 15 classrooms, administrative office, lunchroom, athletic room, shoe repair, upholstery and radio repair shop, cosmetology, foods and clothing labs. It was opened in January 1948 with an enrollment of 415 students. Its first graduating class participated in commencement in May.

In 1956, seven classrooms, a library and gym were added to the school plant, and in 1968, a vocational program was started. In the spring of 1970, a new $300,000 facility was erected by the Jefferson County Board of Education to house the Wenonah Area Vocational School. The building was located on the southwest side of the Wenonah High School campus.

In 1973, Wenonah grew to a record enrollment of 1,400 students and in 1974 was annexed into the city of Birmingham. Administration of Wenonah was taken over by the Birmingham Board of Education.

In 1981, a new gym was constructed and equipped at a cost of more than $1 million. By 2000, the Wenonah physical plant had grown to include an elementary school, a state technical school and a junior college.

Construction started on the current Wenonah campus in 2005 and was completed in 2007 at a cost of $41 million. The site of the new school is located northeast of the previous facility.

== Campus ==
The current Wenonah campus is a 183,000-square-foot (17,000 m^{2}) facility that accommodates up to 1,200 students. It includes a 750-seat auditorium with theatrical lighting and sound systems. The main academic building features a media center, computer laboratories, and classrooms.

A career-technical wing contains an electronics classroom and lab, a fully equipped commercial kitchen and a family and consumer science classroom. There are also classrooms and labs for welding and cosmetology. The wing also includes classrooms for the band and choir, as well as the cafeteria.

The school includes a gymnasium for practice and physical education classes. The "new gym" that was part of the old school, a free-standing building, has been renovated and expanded to be a 1,400 seat-competition gym. In 2014, the gym was named the Willie High Basketball Arena in honor of Willie High, Sr.

The school includes a football stadium with a six-lane track, concession stands, restrooms and irrigation system. The stadium, which seats 4,500, was completed in December 2007. In 2012, a Field House Training Facility was opened. In 2014, the stadium was named the Bell-Cullpepper Stadium, in honor of Robert Bell and L. C. Cullpepper.

== Athletics ==
Wenonah competes in AHSAA Class 4A athletics and fields teams in the following sports:

- Baseball
- Basketball (boys and girls)
- Cheerleading
- Cross Country (boys)
- Football
- Indoor track and field (boys)
- Outdoor track and field (boys and girls)
- Softball
- Volleyball

Wenonah has won state championships in the following sports:

- Boys' basketball (1977 (Freshmen), 1990, 1993, 2011, 2012, 2013, 2019, 2026)
- Girls' basketball (1949 (AIAA), 1986, 1990, 1993, 2004, 2014, 2015, 2016, 2017)

Wenonah's football team won regional championships in 1985, 1989, 1995, 1997,2015, and State 5A Runner-up in 2016.

== Notable alumni ==
- Arthur D. Beard (1998), professional musician
- Emanuel (Tubb) Bell (1973), girls' basketball coach, inducted into the Alabama High School Sports Hall of Fame (Class of 2025) with a 530–194 career record and 5 state championships.
- Grady Brown (1995), professional football coach
- Ralph D. Cook (1961), former Associate Justice on the Alabama Supreme Court
- Alonzo Ephraim (1999), former offensive lineman for the University of Alabama, Philadelphia Eagles, Miami Dolphins, and Cleveland Browns
- Ron Jackson (1971), former MLB player for the California Angels, Minnesota Twins, Detroit Tigers, and Baltimore Orioles
- Lawrence Jackson (1968), former MLB player for the Chicago White Sox
- Ligarius Jennings (1996), former football player for the Cincinnati Bengals
- Lamar Johnson (1968), former MLB player for the Chicago White Sox and Texas Rangers
- John McDaniel (1969), former wide receiver for the Cincinnati Bengals and Washington Redskins
- Sam Shade (1991), former safety for the University of Alabama, Cincinnati Bengals, and Washington Redskins
- Jeremy Towns (2008), former defensive tackle for the Buffalo Bills
- Joe Webb (2005), former quarterback for the University of Alabama - Birmingham and Quarterback for the Carolina Panthers
- Chad Williams (1998), former safety for the Baltimore Ravens and San Francisco 49ers
- Quinnen Williams (2016), defensive lineman for the Dallas Cowboys, New York Jets and University of Alabama; 2018 Outland Trophy Winner
- Quincy Williams (2014), linebacker for the Cleveland Browns, New York Jets, Jacksonville Jaguars, and Murray State
- De'Runnya Wilson (2013), wide receiver for Mississippi State, and Albany Empire, and 2013 Parade All-American Basketball Team.
