= John Archibald (writer) =

American journalist

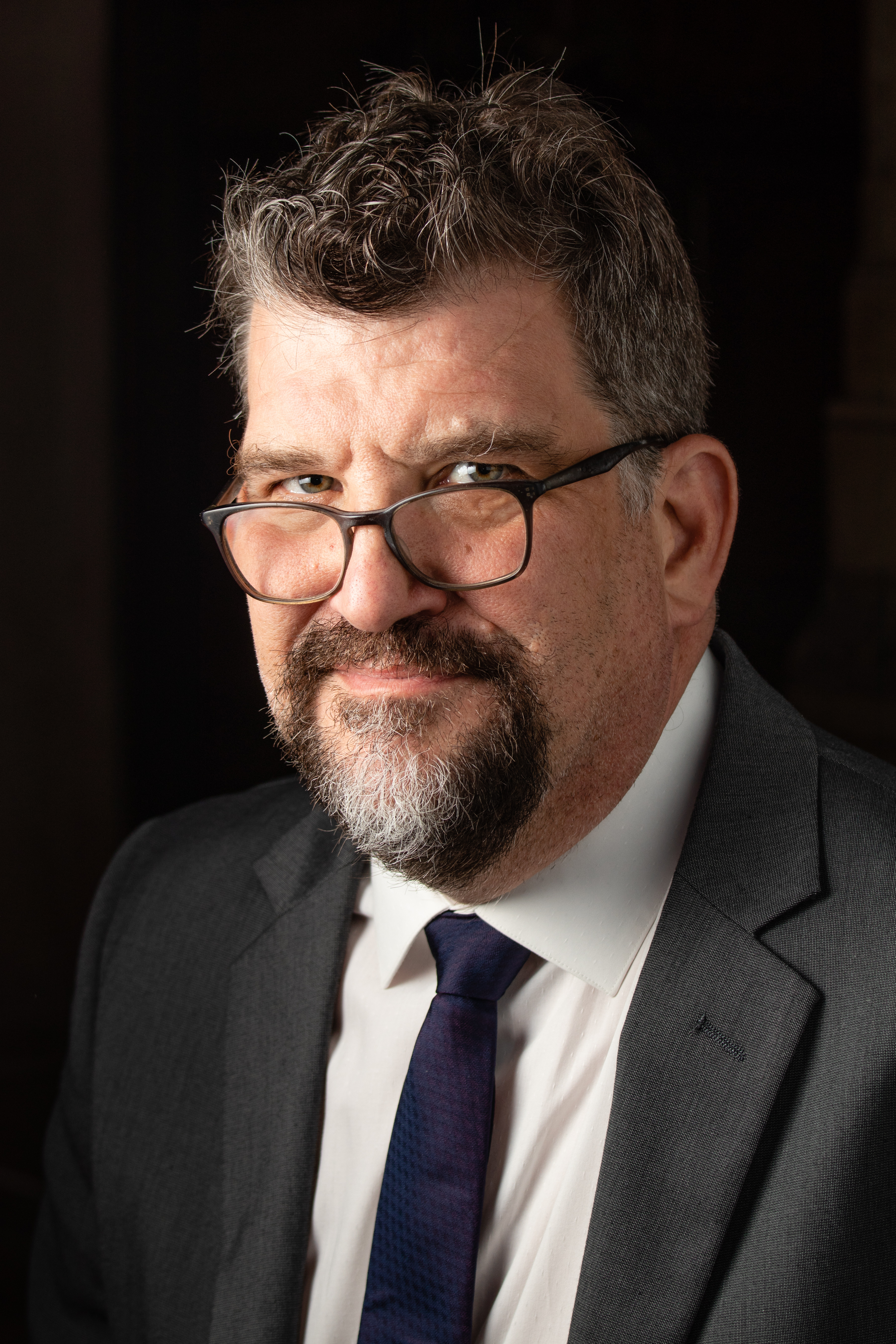
- Born: April 1963 (age 62–63); Alabaster, Alabama, USA
- Education: University of Alabama
- Occupations: news reporter, columnist
- Spouse: Alecia Archibald
- Children: 3
- Writing career
- Notable awards: 2018 Pulitzer Prize for Commentary; 2023 Pulitzer Prize for Local Reporting; 2021 Edward R. Murrow Award
- Website: www.johnarchibaldink.com

John Archibald (born April 1963) is an American newspaper reporter and columnist for Al.com (Alabama Media Group). He won the 2018 Pulitzer Prize for Commentary and was the lead reporter on an investigative series that shared the 2023 Pulitzer Prize for Local Reporting. In 2021 he co-hosted a podcast that won an Edward R. Murrow Award.

== Early life and education ==
Archibald was born in Alabaster, Alabama. His father was a Methodist minister and the family moved several times as he was assigned to different churches, finishing his career in Decatur. Archibald attended Banks High School in Birmingham, graduating in 1981, and in 1986 earned a degree in journalism from the University of Alabama. He has said that he decided on his major because he loved working for the student newspaper, The Crimson White.

== Career ==
He joined The Birmingham News, a forerunner of the news website AL.com, in 1986. He became a metro columnist and in 2004 a political commentator.

The focus of his commentary is political corruption and other problems in Alabama politics, sometimes in collaboration with Kyle Whitmire. In 2017 he became a founder contributor to AL.com's Reckon project for political reporting and commentary. He was awarded the 2018 Pulitzer Prize for Commentary "for lyrical and courageous commentary that is rooted in Alabama but has a national resonance"; among topics of his writing in the previous year were Roy Moore's candidacy in the 2017 special election for the United States Senate, Governor Robert Bentley, and the controversy over Confederate monuments, but also the bribery of state politician Oliver Robinson.

In 2020, he was awarded a Nieman Foundation fellowship at Harvard University, where he studied the role of the media in shaping public perceptions of crime and the police and whether crime reporting contributes to a "culture of fear". In 2023, he was a writer in residence at Boston University.

In 2021, with Roy S. Johnson, he co-hosted Unjustifiable, a six-part podcast on Reckon radio about the 1979 shooting of Bonita Carter, a Black woman, by a Birmingham police officer and its repercussions for the police department and the city. The series won the 2021 Edward R. Murrow Award for best podcast by a small digital news organization.

From January 2022 he was lead reporter in an investigation by AL.com of abusive policing in the small town of Brookside, which was the co-winner of the 2023 Pulitzer Prize for Local Reporting; the series was described there as having "prompted the resignation of the police chief, four new laws and a state audit".

In September 2024, he was elected to the Pulitzer Prize Board.

== Personal life ==
Archibald and his wife Alecia have three children. His son Ramsey Archibald is also a reporter for AL.com, and the two have collaborated, including on the Brookside policing investigation.

== Publications ==
Archibald's book Shaking the Gates of Hell was published by Alfred A. Knopf in 2021. It examines the failure of the Methodist Church and of his own father to support the 1960s Civil Rights struggle in the South.
