= L. Frazier Banks High School =

Former school in Alabama, United States

Coordinates: 33.57075°N 86.70753°W

L. Frazer Banks High School was a high school and later L. Frazer Banks Middle School, a middle school, in the Birmingham Public School System in Birmingham, Alabama, United States. The school, which was named for former superintendent L. Frazer Banks, occupied six buildings in a residential area of Birmingham's South East Lake neighborhood. It was demolished in 2021.

== History ==
The school was opened as a high school in 1957 and, at first, accepted only freshmen. The high school's first graduating class matriculated in 1961. The school's athletic teams in that 1960-61 season won the Birmingham city football, basketball and baseball championships.

In the early part of that decade, a U. S. Air Force F-86D/L "Sabre", tail number 52-4243, was acquired when it was taken off active service. The aircraft was painted in the school colors of Columbia Blue and Scarlet, then was installed as a mascot and landmark in front of the school.

In the fall of 2007, after the school's closure, the state of Alabama agreed to turn over the landmark jet, which was actually still owned by the USAF, to the Southern Museum of Flight, where it will be restored to its original Maine Air National Guard active military color scheme for display.

== Athletics ==
=== AHSAA 4A State Championships ===
- Football: 1972, 1973

=== Football ===
In 1972 and 1973, the late coach George "Shorty" White led the Banks Jets to Back-2-Back 4A state football championships. The school was recognized nationally as a football power, even appearing in the pages of National Geographic. Future NFL quarterback Jeff Rutledge led the team into a 1974 showdown with Woodlawn High School and future NFL running back Tony Nathan at Legion Field. The crowd was estimated at 42,000. The school's 1974 football game against Woodlawn has been described as the biggest in Alabama high school sports history.

In 2015, Universal Pictures released Woodlawn which highlighted both Alabama highschool football programs during the 1970s.

== Conversion to Middle School ==
In the 1990s, Banks was transformed into a middle school under the direction of Superintendent Cleveland Hammonds. As a middle school, Banks fed into Woodlawn High School. A December 2000 arson damaged the auditorium and destroyed dozens of band instruments.

== Closure ==
In October 2006, the Facilities and Technology Committee of the Birmingham Board of Education heard a recommendation from new superintendent of schools Stan Mims to close Banks and transfer its students to the new Ossie Ware Mitchell School. The recommendation was approved, with students transferring during the 2006 Christmas break.

== Notable Banks High School alumni ==
- John Amari (1966) member of both houses of the Alabama State Legislature, 10th District Circuit Court judge
- John Archibald (writer), news reporter, columnist, and Pulitzer Prize recipient
- David Cutcliffe (1972), football coach (Coached Banks HS in 1980-81 with 17-4-1 record), previous Tennessee Offensive Coordinator, former 'Ole Miss Head Football Coach and currently Duke University Head Football Coach
- Marcus Dowdell, former NFL wide receiver
- Jeff Herrod, former NFL linebacker
- Johnny Musso, former NFL running back
- Jeff Rutledge (1975), NFL quarterback, two time Alabama National Championship Quarterback, Arizona Cardinals Quarterbacks Coach, current head coach at Valley Christian High School (Arizona)
- Billy Shields, former NFL offensive tackle
- Greg Shaw, Associate Justice of the Alabama Supreme Court
- Jimmy Sidle, First-team All-American quarterback at Auburn University (1963), SEC Player of the Year (1963), NFL Running back
- Beth Thornley, songwriter and recording artist
- Larry Willingham, NFL St. Louis Cardinals, WFL Birmingham Americans

== Sources ==
- Jordan, Phillip. (March 23, 2006) "Hitting the right note: Can neighborhood associations help fill the funding gap for city schools?" Birmingham Weekly.
- Ingram, Ron (September 20, 2006) "Ex-Jets recall success." Birmingham News.
- Hickerson, Patrick (October 3, 2006) "Banks Middle closing pondered." Birmingham News.
- Archibald, John (October 5, 2006) "Sad, unsafe school once was mighty." Birmingham News.
- Hickerson, Patrick (January 5, 2007) "Students, staff value Banks' replacement." Birmingham News.
- Archibald, John (May 31, 2007) "Banks jet to be mighty once more." Birmingham News.
