= Jeremy Towns =

American football player (born 1989)

No. 90
- Position: Defensive tackle

Personal information
- Born: March 9, 1989 (age 37)
- Listed height: 6 ft 4 in (1.93 m)
- Listed weight: 290 lb (132 kg)

Career information
- High school: Birmingham (AL) Wenonah
- College: Samford
- NFL draft: 2014: undrafted

Career history
- Washington Redskins (2014)*; Buffalo Bills (2014)*; Philadelphia Eagles (2015)*
- * Offseason or practice squad member only
- Stats at Pro Football Reference

Jeremy Towns (born March 9, 1989) is an American medical doctor and former football player in the National Football League (NFL). He played as a defensive tackle for the Washington Redskins, the Buffalo Bills, and the Philadelphia Eagles.

== Early life and education ==
Towns grew up in Dolomite, an unincorporated community near Birmingham, Alabama, and attended Wenonah High School. He studied sports medicine as an undergraduate, receiving a degree from Samford University where he played football as a defensive lineman. Shortly before he was due to start medical school, he signed as a free agent with the Washington Redskins, and deferred.

Following his career in the NFL, Towns returned to the University of South Alabama, and graduated as an MD. He did his residency in emergency medicine at the UAB Hospital.

== Career and community work ==
From 2014 to 2015, Towns played football in the National Football League (NFL). He played in pre-season games with the Washington Redskins, but was cut before the season began. He then signed with the Buffalo Bills, where he remained for a full season through the following pre-season, then played briefly for the Philadelphia Eagles. An ankle injury led him back to medicine.

Towns has given back regularly to the community through the RANSOM (Radical Athlete and Student Oasis Ministry) campus ministry group he founded, and by running youth football camps throughout Alabama and serving as a mentor.

"It's a free country"
