= Charles B. Glenn =

American educator (1871–1967)

- Born: Charles Bowles Glenn; December 1, 1871; Auburn, Alabama
- Died: April 21, 1967 (aged 95); Birmingham, Alabama
- Education: Alabama Agricultural and Mechanical College (B.S., 1891; M.S., 1892); Harvard University (A.B., 1896)
- Occupation: Educator

Charles Bowles Glenn (December 1, 1871 — April 21, 1967) was an American educator who served as superintendent of the Birmingham, Alabama school district from 1921 to 1942, and was president of the National Education Association from 1937 through 1938. Glenn was one of the earliest proponents and implementors of character education in schools, and he is the namesake of Charles B. Glenn Middle School—formerly Charles B. Glenn Vocational High School—in Birmingham.

== Early life and education ==
Charles B. Glenn was born and raised in Auburn, Alabama, where, at the age of eighteen, he laid the first brick for the Auburn University main building, Samford Hall. He attended Auburn High School and the Alabama Agricultural and Mechanical College (today Auburn University) in Auburn, graduating from the latter institution with B.S. and M.S. degrees in 1891 and 1892. He later attended Harvard University, receiving an A.B. degree in 1896. Glenn would later receive honorary degrees from the University of Alabama (LL.D., 1918) and Birmingham–Southern College (Litt. D., 1931).

== Career as educator ==
Glenn began teaching in the schools of Auburn and Evergreen, Alabama before being appointed principal of Paul Hayne School in Birmingham, Alabama in 1899. He was soon promoted to Assistant Superintendent of the Birmingham school district in 1908, and upon the death of longtime superintendent John Herbert Phillips in 1921, became superintendent of that district. As superintendent, Glenn implemented character education programs in the Birmingham schools, among the first such programs in the United States.

Birmingham faced significant growth in the 1920s, and Glenn shepherded a massive school building program for the district. Between 1923 and 1930, Birmingham passed two major bond issues to construct dozens of schools; today, the majority of Birmingham's 70 schools were built during Glenn's 1920s building program. Glenn also pushed for significant expansion of educational opportunities for African Americans, particularly in the area of vocational education, a position which earned him the enmity of the Ku Klux Klan.

In 1937, Glenn was elected president of the National Education Association, and also served as the head of the American Association of School Administrators. Glenn retired as superintendent of the Birmingham schools in 1942.

== Retirement ==
After his retirement, Glenn served for a year as Birmingham's director of counseling and guidance, and that same year was named Birmingham's superintendent emeritus, a position he held until his death. In retirement, Glenn taught summer courses at the Ohio State University, acted as an educational consultant, and authored magazine articles. The Birmingham school district honored Glenn in 1953 with the naming of a new high school after him, the Charles B. Glenn Vocational High School. Glenn died in Birmingham on April 21, 1967.
