= Ramsay High School =

Coordinates: 33.498°N 86.798°W

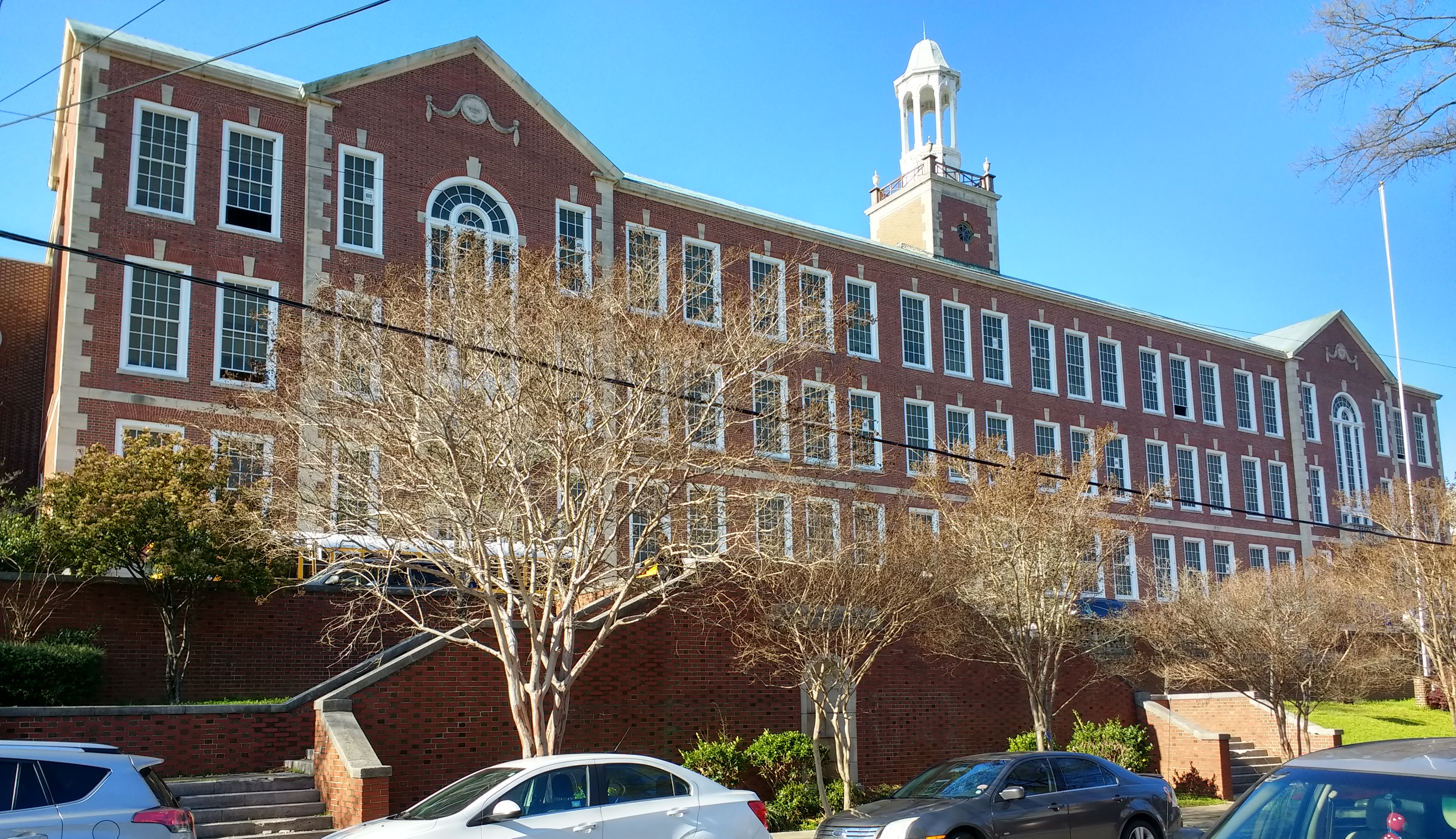

Location
- 1800 13th Avenue South; Birmingham, Alabama 35205; United States

Information
- School type: Magnet
- Established: 1930 (96 years ago)
- School district: Birmingham City Schools
- CEEB code: 010355
- Principal: Carolyn Russel-Walker
- Teaching staff: 45.00 (FTE)
- Grades: 9-12
- Enrollment: 711 (2023–2024)
- Student to teacher ratio: 15.80
- Colors: Royal blue and white
- Athletics: AHSAA Class 5A
- Nickname: Rams
- Website: www.bhamcityschools.org/o/rhs

Ramsay High School is a four-year magnet high school in Birmingham, Alabama. It is one of seven high schools in the Birmingham City School System and one of three International Baccalaureate schools in the Birmingham metropolitan area. Originally called Southside High School, it was later renamed in honor of industrialist Erskine Ramsay. School colors are royal blue and white, and the athletic teams are called the Rams. Ramsay competes in AHSAA Class 5A athletics.

== History ==
Ramsay's campus was designed by the firm of Warren Knight and Davis with William B. Ittner of St Louis, Missouri, as a consulting architect. The design called for multi-story facades facing north and south, wings for a cafeteria and auditorium, and expansive terraces. Only the south-facing portion of the central building was finished.

Circa 1970 it received an influx of black students after Samuel Ullman High School closed.

The school opened on September 19, 1930, and was accredited by the Southern Association of Colleges and Schools in 1932. The auditorium and athletic facilities were constructed in 1949, and a flat-roofed annex was added onto the main building in 1962.

In 1975, Ramsay High School became a magnet school that served gifted students from throughout the city. It is now an International Baccalaureate school and the only Birmingham city school to focus exclusively on college preparation.

A $21 million renovation was completed in 2009, resulting in a new science wing, competition gym, ROTC program space, counseling office, and cafeteria. The 1962 "flat top" annex was demolished to expand the school's courtyard and parking lot.

== Student profile ==
Enrollment in grades 9–12 for the 2013–14 school year is 758 students. Approximately 99% of students are African-American and 1% are white. Roughly 61% of students qualify for free or reduced price lunch.

Ramsay has a graduation rate of 99%. Approximately 95% of its students meet or exceed proficiency standards in both reading and mathematics. The average ACT score for Ramsay students is 22 and the average SAT composite is 1450.

== Academics ==
=== International Baccalaureate Program ===
The IB Diploma Programme at Ramsay High School is a challenging and comprehensive two-year curriculum for motivated high school students. Juniors and seniors take six rigorous courses in the following subject groups: English; second language; experimental sciences; the arts; math; and individuals and societies. IB students also engage in three core requirements: an extended essay (4,000 words); theory of knowledge (interdisciplinary course); and creativity, action, service (community service). The IB Diploma Programme is an academically challenging and balanced pre-university program of education with final examinations that prepares students for success at university and in life beyond.

=== Curriculum ===
Ramsay students can take one or more of the following Advanced Placement and International Baccalaureate courses:

- English Language & Composition (AP)
- English Literature & Composition (AP and IB)
- Biology (AP and IB)
- Calculus (AP)
- Chemistry (AP and IB)
- Environmental Science (AP)
- French (IB)
- Mathematical Studies (IB)
- Precalculus (AP)
- African-American Studies (AP)
- Physics (AP)
- Spanish (IB and AP)
- Studio Art (AP and IB)
- Theory of Knowledge (IB)
- US Government (AP)
- US History (AP and IB)
- Statistics (AP)

== Athletics ==
Ramsay competes in AHSAA Class 5A athletics and fields teams in the following sports:

- Baseball
- Basketball
- Bowling
- Football
- Golf
- Indoor Track & Field
- Outdoor Track & Field
- Soccer
- Softball
- Swimming
- Tennis
- Volleyball
- Lacrosse
- Wrestling

Ramsay has won a total of 25 state championships in the following sports:

- Baseball (1948)
- Boys' basketball (2006, 2010)
- Girls' basketball (2004, 2005, 2006, 2007)
- Boys' cross country (1966)
- Football (1934, 1947, 2016, 2022, 2023 Class 5A State Runner Up)
- Girls' tennis (1968, 1969)
- Boys' outdoor track and field (1937, 1938, 1939, 1940, 1941, 1949, 1951, 1952)
- Volleyball (1985, 1986, 1987, 1988, 1990)

== Notable alumni ==
- Phillip Alford, actor who appeared as the character Jem Finch in To Kill a Mockingbird (1962). Alford's other acting credits include: Fair Play (1972), The Intruders, Shenandoah, and Bristle Face.
- Barry Beckett, Hall of Fame keyboardist, member of the Muscle Shoals Rhythm Section otherwise known as "The Swampers".
- Lew Bostick, football player and coach, captain of the 1938 Alabama Crimson Tide football team, selected in the NFL draft by the Cleveland Rams, played one season, assistant coach for many years at Alabama.
- Dellynne Catching, Miss Alabama 1968.
- Fannie Flagg, TV announcer in Birmingham, Hollywood actress, comedian, and novelist. Author of Fried Green Tomatoes at the Whistle Stop Cafe. 1991 Academy Award nomination for her screenplay adaptation for the film Fried Green Tomatoes.
- Louise Fletcher, winner of the 1975 Oscar and Golden Globe Award for Best Actress for her role as Nurse Ratched in One Flew Over the Cuckoo's Nest.
- Andrew Glaze, poet, playwright, and novelist.
- Angie Grooms, Miss Alabama 1966, Birmingham City Council 1971–1977 (known as Angie Proctor).
- Sheldon Hackney, historian and educator, provost of Princeton University 1972–1975, president of Tulane University 1975–1980, president of the University of Pennsylvania 1981–1993, chairman of the National Endowment for the Humanities 1993–1997.
- Tim Keenan III, college football defensive tackle for the Alabama Crimson Tide
- Baker Knight, musician and songwriter, whose compositions include "Lonesome Town" recorded by Ricky Nelson, "The Wonder of You" recorded by Elvis Presley, and "Don't the Girls All Get Prettier at Closing Time" recorded by Mickey Gilley.
- Kordell Jackson, CFL defensive back for the Edmonton Elks
- Vaughn Mancha, Hall of Fame football player, coach, administrator, and teacher. Garnered All-SEC and All-America honors during four years at the University of Alabama, drafted by the Boston Yanks in the first round of the NFL draft of 1948, head football coach at Livingston State College (University of West Alabama) 1949–1951, athletic director at Florida State University 1960–1972. Inducted into the College Football Hall of Fame in 1990.
- Wayne Rogers, the actor on the TV series M*A*S*H who played Captain "Trapper" John McIntyre.
- Starling Thomas V, NFL, cornerback, Arizona Cardinals
- Scooby Williams, college football linebacker for the Texas A&M Aggies
- Roy Wood Jr., the comedian has served as a correspondent for The Daily Show on Comedy Central since 2015.
