= Jeff Rutledge =

American football player and coach (born 1957)

No. 8, 17, 10
- Position: Quarterback

Personal information
- Born: January 22, 1957 (age 69); Birmingham, Alabama, U.S.
- Listed height: 6 ft 1 in (1.85 m)
- Listed weight: 195 lb (88 kg)

Career information
- High school: L. Frazier Banks (Birmingham)
- College: Alabama
- NFL draft: 1979: 9th round, 246th overall pick

Career history

Playing
- Los Angeles Rams (1979–1982); New York Giants (1983–1989); Washington Redskins (1990–1992)

Coaching
- Vanderbilt (1995–1997) Quarterbacks & wide receivers coach; Vanderbilt (1998–2001) Quarterbacks coach; Montgomery Bell Academy (2002–2006) Head coach; Arizona Cardinals (2007–2008) Quarterbacks coach; New York Sentinels (2009) Quarterbacks & tight ends coach; Pope John Paul II High School (2010–2012) Head coach; Valley Christian High School (2013–2017) Head coach

Awards and highlights
- 2× Super Bowl champion (XXI, XXVI); National champion (1978); 2× Second-team All-SEC (1977, 1978)

Career NFL statistics
- Passing attempts: 526
- Passing completions: 274
- Completion percentage: 52.1%
- TD–INT: 16–29
- Passing yards: 3,628
- Passer rating: 61.4
- Stats at Pro Football Reference

Jeffrey Ronald Rutledge (born January 22, 1957) is an American former professional football player and coach. He played as a quarterback for 14 seasons in the National Football League (NFL). A backup for most of his career, he was a member of the New York Giants team that won a Super Bowl in Super Bowl XXI and the Washington Redskins team that won Super Bowl XXVI.

Rutledge played college football for the Alabama Crimson Tide, starting at quarterback for their 1978 national championship victory. He was selected by the Los Angeles Rams in the ninth round of the 1979 NFL draft. He became a coach after his playing career.

== Early life ==
Rutledge was born and raised in Birmingham, Alabama. He was part of a team that earned back-to-back state titles at L. Frazier Banks High School in Birmingham, Alabama. As a senior, he was a member of the 1974 Parade High School All-American team.

== College career ==
Rutledge played collegiately at Alabama, where he was a member of three SEC Championship teams under Coach Paul "Bear" Bryant. He was the starting quarterback on the 1978 National Championship team. A three-year starter, he also led Alabama to the #2 National ranking in 1977. He also led the Crimson Tide to two Sugar Bowl appearances and two SEC Championships. Rutledge earned MVP honors at the 1978 Sugar Bowl and also earned All-SEC honors in 1978 and 1979.

He finished his college career with a 33-5 record as a starter, which currently ranks him as the University of Alabama's seventh all-time winningest quarterback. He received his degree from Alabama in Business Administration and in 2011, was inducted into the Alabama Sports Hall of Fame.

Jeff's brother, Gary Rutledge, was also a quarterback at Alabama, playing there from 1972 to 1974.

== Playing career ==
Selected in the ninth round of the 1979 NFL draft (246th overall pick) by the Los Angeles Rams, Rutledge played in 14 NFL seasons from 1979 to 1992 for three different teams. Rutledge spent most of his career as a back-up quarterback and a holder on kicks. He was a backup in Super Bowl XIV as a member of the Los Angeles Rams, he was a backup to Super Bowl MVP Phil Simms in Super Bowl XXI as a member of the New York Giants, and was a backup in Super Bowl XXVI as a member of the Washington Redskins. His most notable play with the Giants came in Super Bowl XXI in the third quarter. On fourth down with a yard needed, he was sent by head coach Bill Parcells for a potential decoy play. When the other team did not pick up on Rutledge, he took the snap and did a sneak up the middle for yardage that gave the Giants a first down that would eventually lead to a go-ahead score.

His finest moment as a professional player came when as a member of the Redskins he came off the bench in a game versus the Detroit Lions in 1990. Trailing 35-14 with 10:37 left in the third quarter Rutledge replaced an ineffective Stan Humphries and led a great comeback. He completed 30 of 42 passes for 363 yards and a touchdown and rushed for 12 yards for the game-tying touchdown with only 24 seconds remaining. In overtime, he hit Art Monk with a vital 40-yard pass on third and 15 to help set up Chip Lohmiller's game-winning field goal.

That game meant that Rutledge got the nod to start the following week on Monday Night against the Philadelphia Eagles in a game that was nicknamed the "Body Bag Game". Rutledge, first, and then Stan Humphries were knocked out of the game, leaving emergency quarterback Brian Mitchell (a kick returner and former college quarterback) to finish the game. Rutledge would never start an NFL game again but he did see spot duty in relief of returning starter Mark Rypien in the Redskins' 1991 Super Bowl Championship season, including some playing time in the last game of the regular season, again against the Philadelphia Eagles.

== Coaching career ==
In the spring of 2007 Rutledge got his first NFL coaching job when he was hired as quarterbacks coach with the NFL's Arizona Cardinals, with direct charge over Kurt Warner. That year, the Cardinals made a late season run and earned a Super Bowl berth, but lost to the Pittsburgh Steelers, 27-23. When the Cardinals hired a new offensive coordinator at the end of that season, Rutledge and most of the offensive staff were fired.

Rutledge served as the quarterbacks and tight ends coach for the New York Sentinels of the United Football League in 2009.

In April 2010, Rutledge agreed to become the head football coach at Pope John Paul II High School in Hendersonville, Tennessee; where he coached for two seasons, leading the Knights to a 4-18 record. He resigned in the Spring of 2012 to return to Arizona to spend time with his family. Rutledge led Montgomery Bell Academy to a 41-17 record from 2002 to 2006, with two state titles in 2002 and 2003 and a #15 ranking in the final USA Today Super 25 poll in 2003.

In May 2013, Rutledge was hired by Valley Christian High School in Chandler, Arizona as a full-time staff member and also to lead the football program. He coached for five seasons until stepping down in 2017, going 23-28 as coach.

== Personal life ==
Rutledge is a Christian and attends Arizona Community Church in Chandler. He and his wife Laura and have 3 children.

== See also ==
- Alabama Crimson Tide football yearly statistical leaders
- History of the New York Giants (1979–1993)
