= Starling Thomas V =

American football player (born 2000)

No. 24 – Arizona Cardinals
- Position: Cornerback
- Roster status: Active

Personal information
- Born: January 25, 2000 (age 26); Birmingham, Alabama, U.S.
- Listed height: 5 ft 10 in (1.78 m)
- Listed weight: 194 lb (88 kg)

Career information
- High school: Ramsay (Birmingham)
- College: UAB (2018–2022)
- NFL draft: 2023: undrafted

Career history
- Detroit Lions (2023)*; Arizona Cardinals (2023–present)
- * Offseason or practice squad member only

Career NFL statistics as of 2024
- Total tackles: 85
- Pass deflections: 11
- Forced fumbles: 1
- Stats at Pro Football Reference

Starling Thomas V (born January 25, 2000) is an American professional football cornerback for the Arizona Cardinals of the National Football League (NFL). He played college football for the UAB Blazers.

== Early life ==
Thomas was born on January 25, 2000, and grew up in Birmingham, Alabama. He attended Ramsay High School and was a top two-way player, being ranked a three-star prospect. He placed as the 145th-best cornerback recruit nationally and the 53rd-best player in the state, and chose to commit to UAB over Middle Tennessee, Memphis and Southern Miss, among others.

== College career ==
Thomas saw immediate playing time as a true freshman in 2018, appearing in 12 games while recording three pass breakups and 10 tackles. He also saw action as a return specialist. The following year, he started all 14 games and posted 27 tackles, one fumble recovered and his first career interception, made against North Texas. Although projected to be starter again in 2020, Thomas suffered a torn ACL that kept him out the entire season. He started all 13 games when he returned in 2021, posting 41 tackles, nine pass breakups and two interceptions, earning honorable mention all-conference honors. As a senior in 2022, Thomas was named first-team all-conference after allowing receptions on only 37.9% of passes thrown at him with 13 passes defended. He played in the East–West Shrine Bowl after the season ended.

== Professional career ==
Pre-draft measurables
| Height | Weight | Arm length | Hand span | Wingspan | 40-yard dash | 10-yard split | 20-yard split | 20-yard shuttle | Three-cone drill | Vertical jump | Broad jump | Bench press |
|---|---|---|---|---|---|---|---|---|---|---|---|---|
| 5 ft 10 1/8 in (1.78 m) | 190 lb (86 kg) | 30 5/8 in (0.78 m) | 9 5/8 in (0.24 m) | 6 ft 2 3/8 in (1.89 m) | 4.38 s | 1.59 s | 2.54 s | 4.36 s | 7.29 s | 37.5 in (0.95 m) | 10 ft 5 in (3.18 m) | 14 reps |
All values from Pro Day

=== Detroit Lions ===
Although various sources projected Thomas as a late-round pick in the 2023 NFL draft, he ended up going unselected. He was signed by the Detroit Lions as an undrafted free agent. He was waived on August 29, 2023.

=== Arizona Cardinals ===
A day after being waived by the Lions, Thomas was claimed off waivers by the Arizona Cardinals. He played in 12 games with seven starts in 2023, recording 38 tackles and five passes defensed. He was named a starting corner the following season, starting 15 of 17 games, recording 47 tackles, six passes defensed, and a forced fumble.

During training camp in 2025, Thomas suffered a torn ACL and was ruled out for the season.

On March 12, 2026, Thomas re-signed with the Cardinals on a one-year contract. Thomas was waived by Arizona as a part of final roster cuts on August 30; he was re-signed to the team's practice squad the following day. He was signed to the active roster on September 23 following an injury to Will Johnson.
