= Beth Thornley =

American singer-songwriter

Beth Thornley is an American singer-songwriter.

== Biography ==
Beth Thornley was born in Birmingham, Alabama and attended the now closed L. Frazier Banks High School. She later went to Samford University and studied classical music where she earned a degree in music education. After graduating, she decided she would like to explore the world of rock and roll, so she moved to Los Angeles and joined the music scene.

== Music ==
Her influences include The Beatles, Aimee Mann, Elvis Costello, Ben Folds and Lucinda Williams. Thornley's second album, My Glass Eye, contains two songs not written by Thornley or Rob Cairns; "Got The Time" (Joe Jackson) and "Eleanor Rigby" (The Beatles).

== Career ==
According to the biography on Thornley's web site, when she first moved to Los Angeles she took advice from a vocal coach who told her "There are a million singers out there. But if you want any control you’ve got to be a songwriter, not just a singer".

Thornley's band is a fluid line-up of musicians that contribute to both live shows and records. The players on her first album, Beth Thornley, were Thornley, Rob Cairns and Rob Disner.

My Glass Eye had a wider group of musicians and singers including Cairns (drums, bass, guitar, synth, keys, accordion, backing vocals), Thornley (piano, accordion, tambourine), Sheldon Gomberg (bass), Mark Browne (bass), Disner (guitar), Michael Bluestein (piano), Jeff Lane (backing vocals), Richard Dodd (cello), Daphne Chen (viola), Leah Katz (viola), Patricia Thornley (backing vocals) Mark Ferik (backing vocals), plus Robert Kelley (clapping), and Paul Trejo (clapping).

The line-up for live shows varies but has included Thornley (keys/vocals), Cairns (guitar, keys) Karen Teperberg (drums), Gomberg (bass), Disner (guitar), Vivi Rama (bass), Mark Browne (bass), and Maria Scherer (cello).

== Discography ==
- Beth's eponymous debut album was released in 2003.

Beth Thornley – Beth Thornley(2003).

- "I Will Lie" (Beth)
- "You Made It So" (Beth)
- "Sunshine and Celluloid" (music: Beth/Rob Cairns, lyrics: Beth)
- "Arrogance" (Beth)
- "How Many Days" (Beth)
- "Don't Save Me" (Beth)
- "Talkin' Like An Angel" (music: Beth/Rob Cairns, lyrics: Beth)
- "Lucky You" (Beth)
- "Go Baby Go" (Beth)
- "Break U N 2" (music: Beth/Rob Cairns, lyrics: Beth)

Beth Thornley – My Glass Eye was released in August 2006.

- "Stand" (Beth)
- "Beautiful Lie" (Beth)
- "Mr. Lovely" (Beth)
- "You're Right Where" (Beth)
- "Once" (Beth)
- "Double-Wide" (Beth)
- "Home By Now" (Beth)
- "Got The Time" (Joe Jackson)
- "Bound" (music: Beth/Rob Cairns, lyrics: Beth)
- "My Glass Eye" (Beth)
- "Birmingham" (music: Rob Cairns, lyrics: Beth)
- "Done" (Beth)
- "Eleanor Rigby" (Paul McCartney/John Lennon)

Beth Thornley – Wash U Clean was the third album released in February 2010.

- "Wash U Clean"
- "Still Can't Hide"
- "Everyone Falls"
- "It's Me"
- "You're So Pony"
- "What the Heart Wants"
- "Bones"
- "There's No Way"
- "Never Your Girl"
- "A to Z"

== Film and television ==
Thornley has contributed songs to several TV programmes and films:

- The Client List – Episode 4 – Season 2 — "Everyone Falls"
- The Client List – Episode 6 – Season 1 — "You're So Pony"
- Royal Pains – Episode 307 — "You're So Pony"
- Jane By Design – Season 1, Episode 3 — "Wash U Clean"
- Between – produced by Opus Films — "You're Right Where"
- Scrubs – Season 1 DVD — "I Will Lie"
- Trollz.com Web site — "Break U N 2" and "Sunshine and Celluloid"
- Beautiful People – Episode 102 on ABC Family — "Go Baby Go"
- The Perfect Man – Hilary Duff movie — "If You Got What You Came For"
- Book of Ruth – CBS movie of the week — "It's a Cruel Thing"
- It Must Be Love – CBS movie of the week — "I Will Lie"
- The Chris Isaak Show – Episode 303 — "I Will Lie"
- Felicity Season 4 DVD — "I Will Lie"
- Thieves on ABC — "Girl in Uniform"
- New Ride with Josh and Emily – M5 Entertainment — "Sunshine and Celluloid"
- Girl in Progress – "There's no Way"
- Dawson's Creek – Season 2 DVD —"You Made It So"
- Friday Night Lights – Season 1, Episode 17 – "Sunshine and Celluloid"
- Hung – Season 3, Episode 25 – "Wash U Clean"
- Magic Mike – Chaning Tatum – "Wash U Clean"
- Life – Season 1, Episode 8 – "Arrogance"
- Almost There (Audience TV Series) – Season 1, Episode 10 – "Still Can't Hide"
