= Birmingham City Schools =

School district in Alabama, United States

Birmingham City School District

Location
- Birmingham, Alabama Alabama United States

District information
- Type: Public
- Motto: Believe. Create. Succeed.
- Grades: PK-12
- Established: 1883
- Superintendent: Dr. Mark Sullivan
- Schools: 42
- Budget: $378 million

Students and staff
- Students: 25,104
- Teachers: 1,579

Other information
- Website: http://www.bhamcityschools.org/

Birmingham City Schools is a public school district that serves the US city of Birmingham, Alabama. It is the fourth-largest school system in Alabama behind Mobile County Public School System, Jefferson County School System, and Montgomery Public Schools. It currently enrolls approximately 25,000 students across 42 schools.

Birmingham City Schools serve a student population that is approximately 95% African-American, 4% Hispanic, and 1% White. Eighty-eight percent of its students qualify for free or reduced price lunch. The district-wide graduation rate is 65%.

== List of schools ==
=== High schools ===
There are seven high schools in the Birmingham City School District: three magnet high schools and four traditional high schools.

School	Type	Enrollment	Student-Teacher Ratio	Graduation Rate	Avg. ACT Score	Athletics
George Washington Carver High School	Regular	902	18:1	70%	18	5A
Huffman High School	Magnet	1,271	19:1	90%	19	7A
P.D. Jackson-Olin High School	Regular	1,073	17:1	70%	19	6A
Parker High School	Regular	884	17:1	72%	19	6A
Ramsay High School	Magnet	758	18:1	95%	22	5A
Wenonah High School	Regular	782	16:1	79%	19	5A
Woodlawn High School	Magnet	857	18:1	79%	18	5A

=== Middle Schools ===
- Green Acres Middle School
- Huffman Middle School
- Jones Valley Middle School
- Ossie Ware Mitchell Middle School
- W. E. Putnam Middle School
- L. M. Smith Middle School
- Malachi Wilkerson Middle School

=== K-8 Schools ===
- William J. Christian K-8 School
- Hayes K-8 School
- Hudson K-8 School
- Inglenook Pre K - 8
- John Herbert Phillips Academy
- South Hampton K-8 School
- Booker T. Washington K-8 School
- Dupuy Alternative School

=== Elementary Schools ===
- Richard Arrington, Jr. Elementary School
- Avondale Elementary School
- Barrett Elementary School
- Charles A. Brown Elementary School
- Bush Hills STEAM Academy
- Central Park Elementary School
- EPIC Alternative Elementary
- Martha Gaskins Elementary
- Glen Iris Elementary School
- Hemphill Elementary School
- Huffman Academy
- Minor Elementary School
- Norwood Elementary School
- Henry J. Oliver Elementary School
- Oxmoor Valley Elementary School
- Princeton Alternative Elementary School
- Robinson Elementary School
- Sun Valley Elementary School
- Tuggle Elementary School
- West End Academy
- Wylam Elementary School

== Former schools ==
- Banks High School (first class graduated 1961, converted to a middle school, closed in 2007)
- Central High School (1906-1918); also briefly called Birmingham High School until 1910; destroyed in fire in 1918.
- Ensley High School (founded 1901, joined Birmingham system in 1910, merged with Jackson Olin in 2006)
- Glenn Vocational High School
- Hayes High School (closed in 2008)
- J. H. Phillips High School (founded as Birmingham High School in 1923, merged into Carver in 2001, became John Herbert Phillips Academy in 2007)
- Thomas School (founded in 1910, long vacant, newly renovated for a homeless mission)
- Ullman High School (founded as a grammar school, became a high school in 1937, now part of the University of Alabama at Birmingham campus
- West End High School (closed in 2008)

== Failing schools ==
Statewide testing ranks the schools in Alabama. Those in the bottom six percent are considered to be failing. Fourteen of the forty-three schools in this district are on in this group:

- Barrett Elementary School
- Charles A Brown Elementary School
- George Washington Carver High School
- Hayes K-8
- Hemphill Elementary School
- Hudson K-EighSchool
- Huffman High School-Magnet
- Jackson-Olin High School
- Parker High School
- Smith Middle School
- Washington Elementary School
- Jones Valley Middle School
- Wenonah High School
- Woodlawn High School-Magnet

== Governance ==
As of 2014 the school board is composed of nine members elected from nine geographical districts within the city of Birmingham. Currently, the President is Randall Woodfin (District 5) and the Vice President is Sherman Collins Jr. (District 1). Five of the nine members are female and eight are African American.

2014 Birmingham Board of Education Trustees:

District 1: Mr. Sherman Collins Jr.
District 2: Mr. Lyord Watson
District 3: Mr. Brian Giattina
District 4: Ms. Daagye Hendricks
District 5: Mr. Randall Woodfin
District 6: Ms. Cheri Gardner
District 7: Mr. Walter Wilson, Sr.
District 8: Mrs. April M. Williams
District 9: Ms. Sandra Brown

== History ==
=== Founding ===
Birmingham's first public school was the Free School established in 1874 under the leadership of John T. Terry and James Powell. Despite its name, the trustees found it necessary to charge a nominal fee to students for a number of years in order to meet their budgets. That school, renamed "Powell School" became a high school when the next school were constructed in 1883. John H. Phillips became superintendent of schools that year and, two years later, oversaw the formation of the first Birmingham Board of Education, taking responsibility for schools out of the direct purview of the mayor and Board of Aldermen.

=== Superintendents (Partial List) ===
- John Herbert Phillips (1883-1921)
- Charles B. Glenn (1921-1942)
- L. Frazier Banks (1951-1959)
- Wilmer Cody (1973-1983)
- Cleveland Hammonds (1988-1994)
- Barbara Allen (2008-2010) Interim
- Craig Witherspoon (2010-2014)

=== Growth ===
Numerous surrounding suburbs and unincorporated areas, most poorly-served with public schools, were annexed into Greater Birmingham in 1910. The city issued $200,000 in bonds in 1915, and an additional $100,000 after Central High School was lost to fire in 1918. Those funds fueled a major campaign to construct new schools, which was interrupted by U.S. involvement in World War I. Once the program resumed in the early 1920s, the need for new schools was dire.

Consultant William Ittner of St Louis, Missouri worked with school officers and local architects to develop a "type" for the new schools to be constructed. The system moved from a "7–4" plan to a "6-3-3" model with elementary, middle and high schools. All of the schools were planned with "enriched facilities" which included space for physical education, domestic sciences, and laboratories and shops for science and manual education, along with libraries, theaters and cafeterias.

A 1923 study recommended a citywide network of neighborhood schools. The city approved an additional $500,000 in bonds and Superintendent Charles Glenn and board chairman Erskine Ramsay charted a building campaign which replaced existing frame structures and temporary rented facilities with massive red-brick school buildings, many of which were designed by noted architects David O. Whilldin and Warren, Knight & Davis. As the growth of the "Magic City" continued through the decade, the building program was expanded to try to keep pace. A second 1927 study led to another bond issue and more new schools. By then, Birmingham's segregation laws had been enacted, creating numerous discrete neighborhoods that soon had their own schools.

In 1952 an assessment of Birmingham's school resources found that 95% of children residing in the city attended one of the 70 schools in the system. The study suggested several new schools be built to accommodate the "baby boom" generation. By 1961 forty-one new buildings had been completed, including several new neighborhood schools as well as auditoria or gymnasiums at existing schools.

=== Desegregation ===
On September 9, 1957, three years after the U.S. Supreme Court had ruled segregated schools unconstitutional, Alabama Christian Movement for Human Rights president Fred Shuttlesworth accompanied a group of four black children and their parents to Phillips High School in an attempt to enroll them as the school's first black students. The group was met by a mob of Klansmen armed with chains, clubs and brass knuckles. Shuttlesworth's wife, Ruby, was stabbed in the hip and his daughter, Ruby Frederika, suffered a broken ankle in the melee. Badly beaten, Shuttlesworth himself spoke that same night to urge continued non-violence on the part of black protesters, even in the face of klan and police brutality.

The suspects charged in the beating saw their charges dropped, while the lawsuit against the city filed by Shuttlesworth failed all the way to the Supreme Court, which upheld Birmingham's rule giving discretion over pupil placement directly to school superintendents.

A lawsuit filed on June 17, 1960 by barber James Armstrong set the stage for court-ordered desegregation of Birmingham City Schools. The court issued a desegregation plan that went into effect in September 1963. Graymont Elementary School was the first white school to have a black student in attendance, on September 4. A bomb which exploded that night at the home of Civil Rights activist Arthur Shores provoked the school system to close temporarily. When schools reopened on September 9, Alabama state troopers acted under orders from Governor George Wallace to prevent the black children from entering the schools. President Kennedy responded by sending the National Guard to escort transfers into West End High School and Ramsay High School on September 10. Five days later, the 16th Street Baptist Church was bombed, killing four young girls.

The system's flagship, Phillips High School, finally admitted its first African American students, (Lillie Mae Jones, Minnie Lee Moore, and Patricia Patton) on September 3, 1964. The 1960s saw rapid white flight from Birmingham into the over the mountain suburbs and other independent municipalities, reducing overall enrollment from 70,000 to 43,000 in 20 years while the percentage of African America students in the system rose from 50 percent to 80 percent.

Armstrong's suit was finally dismissed in 1983 by U. S. District Court judge Junius Foy Guin Jr. He determined that the system had demonstrated that its magnet school programs had attracted enough black students to formerly white schools to achieve "racial mix goals" without forced busing.

=== Consolidation ===
The city school system has declined in enrollment since the 1970s when 60,000 to 70,000 students filled the halls. In Fall 2004 the system lost more than 2,000 students from the year previous, then another 1,565 in 2005, 1,080 in 2006, 1,343 for 2007 and 433 for 2008. The number of students determines, in large part, the amount of state funding given to the system.

Superintendent Mims initially said that approximately 10 schools would be recommended for closure before the Fall 2007 school year. In April 2007 it was proposed that L. Frazier Banks Middle School, Curry Elementary School and Kennedy Alternative School would close, along with the McCaw School for students with severe behavioral problems and the Eureka Center, housing the system's Family Literacy Center. Banks closed in December 2006 while Curry and Kennedy were closed during the summer of 2007. Mims said that he would wait until after Labor Day 2007 to make recommendations for further school closures.

In January 2008 Mims presented a revised school-reorganization plan to the board. Under that proposal a total of 18 schools would close over the following four years. Among the changes to the plan, Glenn Middle School and Norwood and Gibson Elementary Schools would remain open while Wilson Elementary School and Putnam and Center Street middle schools would close. Ramsay High School would be converted into a magnet middle school while an expanded Parker High School would accommodate students from Ramsay.

In February 2008 Mims was placed on leave and Barbara Allen took over as acting superintendent. She held further public meetings and then presented a consolidation plan to the board which was approved on February 26. Under the approved plan, Hayes and West End High Schools would close in the summer of 2008 along with Kingston K-8 School, McElwain, and Oliver Elementary Schools. In 2009 Kirby Middle School would close while a new Hudson K-8 School was created and Norwood Elementary School expanded to K-8. In 2010 Wilson, North Birmingham and Gibson Elementary Schools would close while a new K-8 school opened at the Hayes High School site. In 2011 Hill, Going, Arthur, Price, Powderly and Wenonah Elementary Schools would close, along with A. G. Gaston K-8 School. Meanwhile, new schools would be created in Oxmoor Valley, Wylam, and Jones Valley.

=== Recent construction ===
Despite the drop in enrollment and a shortage of revenues for school operations, the system has significant resources for capital projects. Based on its 2004 enrollment, Birmingham City Schools were given a $331 million share of the Jefferson County School Construction Fund, a $1.1 billion bond issue financed by a county-wide sales tax increase.

The Board voted on January 23, 2007 to contract with Volkert & Associates of Mobile to oversee construction management for all capital projects planned using those funds. On April 22 the Board approved a $283 million construction plan which would cover construction of 10 new schools and the renovation or expansion of 13 others. The plan would provide $27.8 million for athletic facilities. $82.5 million would be used for construction 6 new elementary schools. $46.25 would cover construction of three K-8 schools, and $54 million would be spent on a new campus for Huffman High School. On May 13 the Board approved architectural contracts for the projects.

In moving toward construction, the board is eager to settle some property disputes with the City of Birmingham. The city loaned the system $3 million in April 2007 as a bailout to fund teacher buyouts. In return certain unused school properties would be ceded to the city. Agreement on which properties would be transferred has not been reached. At the same time some schools are constructed on land to which the city holds the title and the board wants to take clear ownership before constructing new buildings.

In March 2011 Superintendent Craig Witherspoon outlined challenges and strategies for the upcoming years. At the time, the system was facing a $23 million deficit which he hoped to address with early retirements, cuts to central office staff, and additional school closures. At the same time, he planned to increase participation in Advanced Placement courses; pursue an International Baccalaureate program in the system; and establish career academies with special training in engineering, finance, information technology and teaching. Six of the city's seven high schools were designated as career academies beginning in Fall 2011.

Some of those initiatives paralleled goals of the Blueprint Birmingham regional economic development campaign and were supported by the Birmingham Education Foundation which raises funds for teacher and staff training, as well as programs for parents.

=== State takeover ===
In 2012 the Alabama Department of Education began investigating the operation of the school system, and specifically the leadership of the Birmingham Board of Education. They reported that the system was bloated with administrators, many of whom were hired by former superintendents and remained on when those superintendents were replaced while others had been promoted to the central office from tenured teaching positions.

On June 27 the State took over operation of the system following the Board's failure to approve a cost-cutting plan to comply with state law requiring systems to maintain cash reserves equal to one month's operating expenses.
