= Pernell Davis =

American football player (born 1976)

No. 93
- Position: Defensive tackle

Personal information
- Born: May 19, 1976 (age 50); Birmingham, Alabama, U.S.
- Listed height: 6 ft 2 in (1.88 m)
- Listed weight: 320 lb (145 kg)

Career information
- High school: West End (Birmingham)
- College: UAB
- NFL draft: 1999: 7th round, 251st overall pick

Career history
- Philadelphia Eagles (1999–2001); Frankfurt Galaxy (2000); Scottish Claymores (2002); Cincinnati Bengals (2002)*
- * Offseason or practice squad member only
- Stats at Pro Football Reference

Pernell Davis (born May 19, 1976) is an American former professional football player who was a defensive tackle for one season with the Philadelphia Eagles of the National Football League (NFL). He attended West End High School in Birmingham, Alabama. He recorded 80 tackles and eight sacks as a junior, and earned all-state honors. He suffered an ankle injury during his senior year, which hampered him throughout the season. Despite this, he earned Parade All-America honors in 1995. Following graduation, he played college football for the UAB Blazers on a scholarship.

Davis was selected by the Eagles in the seventh round of the 1999 NFL draft and played in two games for the team in 1999. He was allocated to the Frankfurt Galaxy of NFL Europa in 2000, but suffered a broken leg in the final regular season game against Berlin Thunder. Davis missed the entire 2000 season. He was released during final roster cuts prior to the 2001 season, but he was brought back on the Eagles' practice squad in December 2001. Davis played for the Scottish Claymores of NFL Europa in 2002, and was signed to a two-year contract by the Cincinnati Bengals in June 2002. He was waived by the Bengals in August 2002.
