= Jeff Herrod =

American football player (born 1966)

No. 54
- Position: Linebacker

Personal information
- Born: July 29, 1966 (age 60); Birmingham, Alabama, U.S.
- Listed height: 6 ft 0 in (1.83 m)
- Listed weight: 249 lb (113 kg)

Career information
- High school: Banks (Birmingham)
- College: Ole Miss
- NFL draft: 1988: 9th round, 243rd overall pick

Career history
- Indianapolis Colts (1988–1996); Philadelphia Eagles (1997); Indianapolis Colts (1998)

Awards and highlights
- NFL combined tackles leader (1994); 2× Second-team All-SEC (1986, 1987)

Career NFL statistics
- Sacks: 14.5
- Interceptions: 5
- Touchdowns: 2
- Stats at Pro Football Reference

Jeff Sylvester Herrod (born July 29, 1966) is an American former professional football player who was a linebacker in the National Football League (NFL) for the Indianapolis Colts and Philadelphia Eagles. He was selected by the Colts in the ninth round of the 1988 NFL draft. He played college football for the Ole Miss Rebels.

== Early life ==
Herrod grew up in a housing project in Birmingham, Alabama. He had to walk two miles to play in a youth football league that didn't charge a fee, and initially had to make do with hand-me-down shoulder pads that he found in a dumpster behind a community center.

== College career ==
Herrod initially planned to enlist in the United States Marine Corps after graduating from Banks High School, but decided instead to play at Ole Miss under head coach Billy Brewer, the only Division I program to offer him a scholarship.

In four years in Oxford, Herrod became one of the greatest defensive players in Southeastern Conference history. A four-year starter, Herrod set school records for tackles in a single game (28) and in a season (128). He was a first-team All-SEC selection in 1986, and was named a second-team All-American by The Associated Press in 1986 and 1987. His 528 tackles are still the most in Ole Miss history, and is second on the SEC's all-time tackles list behind only Tennessee's Andy Spiva. He was named to the Ole Miss Team of the Century in 1993, and was selected as an SEC Football Legend in 2013. He was inducted into the Alabama Sports Hall of Fame in 2017 and was inducted into the Mississippi Sports Hall of Fame in July 2023.

== Professional career ==
Herrod still planned on joining the Marines after college. However, Indianapolis Colts linebackers coach Rick Venturi happened to see footage from the 1987 Blue–Gray Football Classic and was intrigued by Herrod, who was the game's defensive MVP. Venturi had already planned to take a scouting trip to check out Mississippi Valley State's Vincent Brown, but decided to take a detour to Oxford in order to see Herrod, who hadn't been invited to the NFL Scouting Combine despite his sterling numbers at Ole Miss. Years later, Venturi recalled that while Herrod was small for a linebacker at 6 ft (1.8 m) and only ran a 4.8 in the 40-yard dash, he was so impressed with Herrod's heart that he wrote in his scouting report, "If we have a chance to draft this guy late, I guarantee he will make our team."

The Colts selected Herrod as their ninth-round pick (243rd overall), and he became the cornerstone of the Colts defense during the early 1990s. Although tackles were an unofficial statistic at the time, the Colts credited him with at least 131 tackles in eight consecutive seasons, including 200 in 1994. He led the Colts in tackles in seven out of eight seasons from 1989 to 1996. He described his playing style as "seek and destroy." Herrod was released by the Colts after the 1996 season. After one season with the Philadelphia Eagles, he returned to the Colts for the 1998 season before retiring. He was unofficially credited with 1,443 tackles as a Colt, the most in franchise history.

Although he was well respected in the locker room, he was largely unnoticed outside of Indianapolis because he played on teams that were mediocre at best and dreadful at worst. The Colts only made the playoffs twice during his two stints with the team, and only finished .500 or better four other times. According to Hall of Fame running back Eric Dickerson, who was Herrod's teammate during his first stint with the Colts, Herrod would have likely made "multiple Pro Bowls" had he played on a better team. Along similar lines, Venturi likened Herrod to Hall of Fame linebacker Mike Singletary.

In a 2022 interview with The Athletic, Herrod revealed that he is dealing with numerous health issues related to his football career. He believes he suffered hundreds of concussions, during his career, and one of his doctors estimated that those were sandwiched around "hundreds of thousands" of "sub-concussions" in which his brain crashed into his skull. Protective equipment (especially helmets) was inferior during his days at Ole Miss, and concussions were merely considered part of the game for much of his NFL career. He is certain that he has chronic traumatic encephalopathy (CTE), though that disease can only be definitively diagnosed in dead people; he has agreed to donate his brain to Boston University's CTE Center for study. He has dealt with migraines since at least 2007, and has chronic pain so severe that he needs assistance to wear dressy clothes and can't bear sitting down for long periods of time.
