= Marcus Dowdell =

American football player (born 1970)

No. 86, 80, 83, 84, 6, 8
- Position: Wide receiver

Personal information
- Born: May 22, 1970 (age 56); Birmingham, Alabama, U.S.
- Listed height: 5 ft 10 in (1.78 m)
- Listed weight: 179 lb (81 kg)

Career information
- High school: Banks (Birmingham, Alabama)
- College: Tennessee State
- NFL draft: 1992: 10th round, 276th overall pick

Career history
- New Orleans Saints (1992–1993); Sacramento Gold Miners (1994); Winnipeg Blue Bombers (1995); Arizona Cardinals (1995–1996); Kansas City Chiefs (1998)*; Edmonton Eskimos (1998); Calgary Stampeders (1999)
- * Offseason or practice squad member only

Career NFL statistics
- Receptions: 37
- Receiving yards: 466
- Touchdowns: 3
- Stats at Pro Football Reference

Marcus Llewellyn Dowdell (born May 22, 1970) is an American former professional football player who was a wide receiver in the National Football League (NFL) for the New Orleans Saints and Arizona Cardinals. He was selected by the Saints in the tenth round of the 1992 NFL draft with the 276th overall pick. He played college football for the Tennessee State Tigers. He also had a career in the Canadian Football League (CFL) for the Sacramento Gold Miners, Winnipeg Blue Bombers, Edmonton Eskimos, and Calgary Stampeders. He is now a Coach at a 6a school in bama
