= Ralph Cook =

American judge (born 1944)

Associate Justice of the Supreme Court of Alabama
- In office 1993–2001
- Appointed by: Jim Folsom
- Preceded by: Oscar W. Adams Jr.
- Succeeded by: Lyn Stuart

Personal details
- Born: Ralph Delano Cook; April 29, 1944 (age 82)
- Party: Democratic
- Spouse: Charlsie Davis
- Children: 3
- Parent(s): Joe Cook; Nannie Cook
- Education: Tennessee State University (BS); Howard University School of Law (JD)
- Profession: Judge

Ralph Delano Cook (born April 29, 1944) is an American judge who served as an associate justice of the Supreme Court of Alabama from 1993 to 2001. Governor Jim Folsom Jr. appointed Cook to finish the term of Oscar W. Adams Jr. upon Adams' retirement.

== Early life, education, and career ==
Raised in Jefferson County, Alabama, Cook was "the second of three children of Joe and Nannie Cook", who owned and operated a cleaning service in Bessemer. Cook received his B.S. from Tennessee State University and his J.D. from Howard University School of Law. He thereafter moved to California, where he taught at San Jose State University and at Cabrillo College. He was an administrative analyst for the city of Berkeley, California, from 1971 to 1973, leaving at the end of 1973 to take a position as a deputy district attorney in Alabama.

After returning to Alabama, he also taught at Miles Law School, and was named the dean of the law school in September 1976, serving in that capacity until 1990.

== Judicial career ==
Cook was the first black person to be elected to a state district judgeship in Jefferson County, Alabama, the largest county in the state, where he served for four and a half years. He thereafter became the first black person to be elected to the circuit court for the same county.

Cook was sworn in as a justice of the state supreme court in November 1993. In November 1994, Cook, running as a Democrat defeated Republican challenger Mark Montiel to win election to a full term on the court. In his 2000 bid for reelection to the court, however, Cook was defeated by Republican challenger Lyn Stuart.

== Personal life ==
Cook married Charlsie Davis, also of Jefferson County, with whom he had two daughters and a son.

Political offices
Preceded by Oscar W. Adams Jr.	Justice of the Supreme Court of Alabama; 1993–2001	Succeeded by Lyn Stuart
