= Oscar W. Adams Sr. =

American journalist (1882–1946)

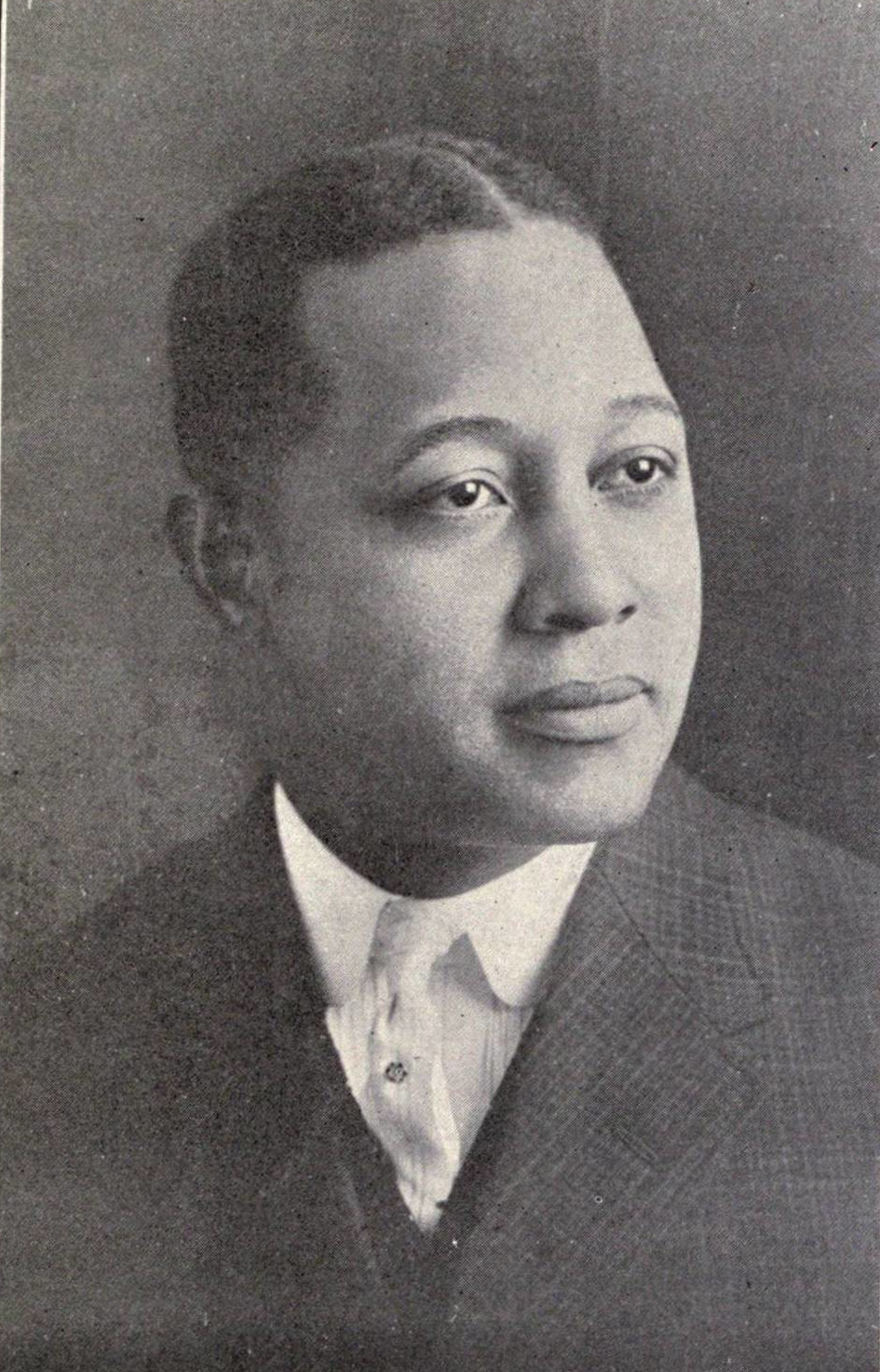
- Born: Oscar William Adams Sr. October 24, 1882
- Died: May 14, 1946 (aged 63)
- Education: Normal A&M College
- Occupation: Journalist

Oscar William Adams Sr. (October 24, 1882 – May 14, 1946) was a journalist and publisher in the United States. He published the Birmingham Reporter. His son Oscar William Adams Jr. became an Alabama Supreme Court Justice.

He was from Gulfcrest, Alabama. Adams and his brother Frank were members of the Knights of Pythias of North America, South America, Europe, Asia, Africa and Australia.

He graduated from Normal A&M College in Normal, Alabama.

== Birmingham Reporter ==
The Birmingham Reporter newspaper in Birmingham, Alabama served the African American community. It was the official newspaper of various fraternal organizations. Oscar W. Adams was its editor.
