= Oscar W. Adams Jr. =

American judge

Justice of the Alabama Supreme Court
- In office October 10, 1980 – October 31, 1993
- Appointed by: Fob James
- Preceded by: James N. Bloodworth
- Succeeded by: Ralph Cook

Personal details
- Born: Oscar William Adams, Jr. February 7, 1925 Birmingham, Alabama, U.S.
- Died: February 15, 1997 (aged 72) Birmingham, Alabama, U.S.
- Spouses: Willa Ingersoll (m. 1949; died 1982); Anne-Marie Bradford
- Children: Gail Adams; Oscar Adams III; Frank Adams
- Parents: Oscar William Adams Sr.; Ella Virginia Eaton
- Education: Talladega College (BA); Howard University (JD)
- Known for: First African-American justice of Alabama Supreme Court

Oscar William Adams Jr. (February 7, 1925 – February 15, 1997) was the first African-American Alabama Supreme Court justice and the first African American elected to statewide office in Alabama (including the Reconstruction era).

== Early life, education, and career ==
Adams was born in Birmingham, Alabama to Oscar William Adams Sr. (editor of the Birmingham Reporter) and Ella Virginia Eaton. Adams was a 1940 graduate of A. H. Parker High School. He went on to earn a bachelor's degree in philosophy at Talladega College in 1944, and a Juris Doctor degree at Howard University in Washington D. C. in 1947. He was admitted to the Alabama Bar that year and launched a private practice, specializing in civil rights cases, often on behalf of Fred Shuttlesworth's Alabama Christian Movement for Human Rights based in Birmingham. During 1963's Birmingham Campaign, Adams was a member of the Central Committee that met at the A. G. Gaston Motel to plan demonstrations.

In 1966, Adams was the first African American to join the Birmingham Bar Association. In 1967, he partnered with white attorney Harvey Burg to form the state's first integrated legal practice. The firm he later founded with James Baker and U. W. Clemon (Adams, Baker and Clemon) was one of the foremost law firms to litigate Civil Rights cases in the 1960s and 1970s.

== Judicial service ==
Adams was appointed to the Alabama Supreme Court on October 10, 1980, by Governor Fob James. He became the first African American to serve on any appellate court in the State of Alabama. He won re-election in 1982 and 1988, becoming the first African American to be elected to a state-wide constitutional office in the history of Alabama.

He taught classes in appellate and trial advocacy at Samford University's Cumberland School of Law. He retired from the bench on October 31, 1993, in order to spend time writing a memoir. Governor Folsom appointed Ralph Cook to finish Adams' term.

== Personal life and death ==
Adams married Willa Ingersoll in 1949, with whom he fathered three children (Gail, Oscar III and Frank). Willa died in 1982 of breast cancer, and Adams later remarried.

Adams died from an infection related to cancer at Baptist Medical Center in Birmingham at age 72. He was survived by his children, ten grandchildren, and his second wife Anne-Marie.

F. H. Threatt (died 1931), who held various public offices in North Carolina, was Adams great-grandfather.

== Honors ==
Oscar W. Adams Elementary School in Gadsden, Alabama was named in his honor in 1983. He was inducted into the Alabama Lawyers Hall of Fame in 2005. He was also inducted into the Birmingham Gallery of Distinguished Citizens in 2008.

== See also ==
- List of African-American jurists
