= Óscar Eyraud Adams =

Mexican activist (c.1986–2020)

- Born: 1986; Tecate, Baja California, Mexico
- Died: 24 September 2020 (aged 33–34); Tecate, Baja California, Mexico
- Occupation: Indigenous rights activist

Óscar Eyraud Adams (c. 1986 – 24 September 2020) was a Mexican indigenous activist known for campaigning in favour of water rights for the Kumeyaay tribe in Baja California and against the dispossession of water supplies by international companies.

== Personal life ==
Eyraud was born in Tecate, Baja California. He was a member of the Kumeyaay community of Juntas de Neji. Eyraud's cousin, Zulema Adams Pereyra, served as the mayor of Tecate.

== Activism ==
In 2020, Eyraud received local press attention after a video of him showing how his crops had dried up following the community water source's diversion was released. Eyraud was critical of the National Water Commission's (CONAGUA) refusal to grant the Kumeyaay community in Juntas de Neji use of a well, while at the same time granting wells to local businesses, including at least twelve to a local Heineken factory. In addition to his work on water rights, Eyraud was also a proponent of increased rights for Mexico's indigenous groups, including the right to self-determination.

Outside of his advocacy for the Kumeyaay, Eyraud also spoke out in favour of the Coordinadora Nacional de Trabajadores de la Educación (CNTE) and their protests against educational reforms being put forward during the presidency of Enrique Peña Nieto. Eyraud also spoke out against forced disappearances.

== Murder ==
On 24 September 2020 Eyraud was chased down his street and shot dead outside his home in Tecate by multiple assassins driving two vehicles with tinted windscreens. Eyraud was among 30 activists killed in Mexico in 2020. It was reported that his killers had links to the narco-state. Following Eyraud's murder, the Northwest National Indigenous Congress and the Northwest Regional Network of Resistance and Rebellions paid tribute to him, calling him "a social fighter for the rights of indigenous people".

The day after Eyraud's death, his brother-in-law was shot dead in a shop in Tecate.
