= John Mason Martin =

American politician and lawyer (1837–1898)

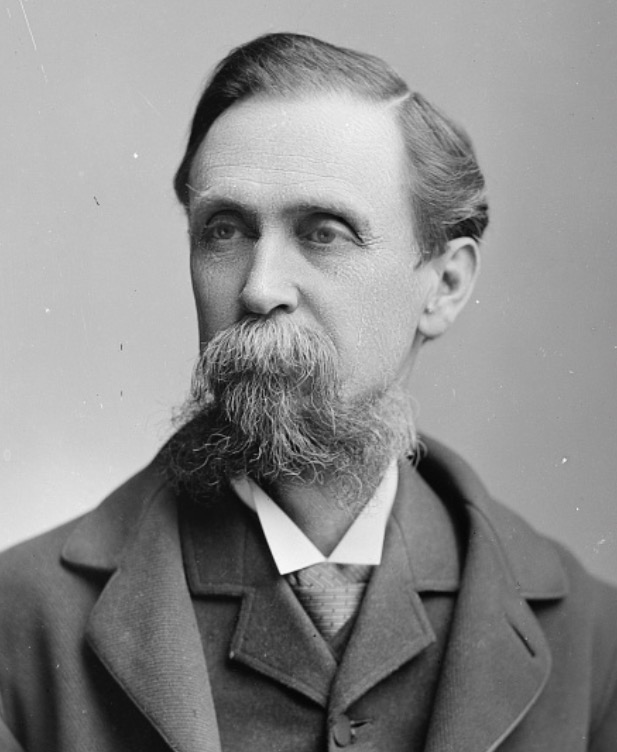
- Portrait of Martin by Charles Milton Bell, taken between 1873 and 1890

Member of the U.S. House of Representatives from Alabama's 6th district
- In office March 4, 1885 – March 3, 1887
- Preceded by: Goldsmith W. Hewitt
- Succeeded by: John H. Bankhead

President pro tempore of the Alabama Senate
- In office 1873–1876

Member of the Alabama Senate
- In office 1871–1876

Personal details
- Born: John Mason Martin; January 20, 1837 Athens, Alabama, US
- Died: June 16, 1898 (aged 61) Bowling Green, Kentucky, US
- Party: Democratic
- Relations: John Y. Mason (uncle); Elisha Wolsey Peck (father-in-law); Samuel Minturn Peck (brother-in-law)
- Parent: Joshua L. Martin (father)
- Occupation: Politician, lawyer

John Mason Martin (January 20, 1837 – June 16, 1898) was an American politician and lawyer. A Democrat, he was a member of the United States House of Representatives from Alabama. He served from 1885 to 1887, representing the state's 6th district.

== Early life and education ==
Martin was born on January 20, 1837, in Athens, Alabama, though The National Cyclopaedia of American Biography states he was born in Athens, Pennsylvania. He was the son of politician Joshua L. Martin and Mary G. (née Mason) Martin. His uncle – his mother's brother – was politician John Y. Mason.

Educated at common schools, Martin studied under Henry Tutwiler. He furthered his education at the University of Alabama and Centre College, graduating from the latter in 1856. He was a member of Phi Gamma Delta. He later received honorary degrees from Auburn University, Centre College, the Central University of Kentucky, Georgetown University, and the University of Alabama. He read law under Elisha Wolsey Peck.

== Career ==
In 1858, Martin was admitted to the bar, after which he began practicing law in Tuscaloosa. By 1860, he owned three slaves. During the American Civil War, he was an officer in the Confederate States Army. From 1875 to 1886, he was a professor of jurisprudence at the University of Alabama.

Martin was a Democrat. From 1871 to 1876, he was a member of the Alabama Senate, serving as its president pro tempore from 1873 to 1876. He was a member of the United States House of Representatives from March 4, 1885, to March 3, 1887, representing Alabama's 6th district. While serving, he was a member of the Committees on Elections and on Patents.

Martin was not nominated for re-election, with his defeat stemming from his support of a tariff. He supported a bill regulating work hours. He was a delegate to the 1856 Democratic National Convention. Politically, he was liberal.

== Personal life and death ==
After serving in Congress, Martin continued practicing law in Birmingham. In 1857, he married Lucy Peck, the daughter of judge Elisha Peck; they had seven children together, four surviving to adulthood. He died on June 16, 1898, in Bowling Green, Kentucky, and was buried at Greenwood Cemetery, in Tuscaloosa.

U.S. House of Representatives
Preceded by Goldsmith W. Hewitt	Member of the U.S. House of Representatives from Alabama's 6th congressional district 1885–1887	Succeeded by John H. Bankhead
