= Jennifer Horne =

Jennifer Horn or Horne may refer to:

- Jennifer F. M. Horne (1931-2008), Kenyan ornithologist and bioacoustician
- Jennifer Horn (born 1964), American politician from New Hampshire
- Jenny Horne (born 1972), American politician from South Carolina
- Jennifer Horne (poet), American writer and former Poet Laureate of Alabama
