= Mary Behrendsen Ward =

Alabama Poet Laureate

Mary Behrendsen Ward (January 21, 1894 – May 13, 1985) was an American Poet and Fiction writer who was the first female Poet Laureate of Alabama from 1954 to 1959. She published over 600 poems in her professional career, in places such as The Birmingham News, and The New York Times, and won the top poetry award, The Century of Progress lyric prize, at the Chicago World's Fair in 1933.

== Life ==
Mary Behrendsen was born on January 21, 1894, in Selma, Alabama to parents, Henry Jorgen Behrendsen, a German immigrant, and Mary Elizabeth Smitherman. Mary's father, Henry, was a Baker by trade and owned a business that the family worked in together.

She married Herbert Jackson Ward in Montgomery, Alabama on July 3, 1918. Mary was a school teacher at the time and Herbert J. Ward was a prominent attorney in Birmingham, Alabama.

During World War II, She reconditioned houses for defense workers and completed the civil service examination for an editorial position covering all state news and when the applicants were rated, Mary was notified that she had made the highest grade and received the rating of No.1.

== Education ==
She graduated from Autauga County High School in Prattville, Alabama in May 1912 and was enrolled in The University of Alabama that same year.

== Career ==
At 12 years old, one of her very first poems was penned in church. It concerned a tiny bug crawling up a lady's shoulder towards her neck. She was the first Poet Laureate since the death of Samuel Minturn Peck, being sworn in on November 21, 1954, by Gov. Gordon Sessions.

"Experts have compared her poems to that of Robert Frost, particularly those in which people are talking"

The Mary B. Ward “Silver Loving Cup”. This cup was offered to the society by Mrs. Ward to be presented to the member of the Poetry Society of Alabama who should contribute the best lyric poem not exceeding 18 lines.

She wrote under several pen names, some of which are; Mary B. Ward, Linn Latham, Amy Atchison and Jack Ordway.

=== Positions held ===
- School Teacher
- President of PTA in Birmingham City Schools
- Principal for the Brent Grammar School
- Editor for the magazine Gammadion, 1925-1927
- Contributing editor to Yankee Humor, 1926-1927
- Associate editor to Poetry Forum, 1930-1931
- Feature writer for The Birmingham News, 1932-1933
- Member, editorial staff, Alabama Federation of Women’s Clubs Magazine, 1935-1936
- Poet Laureate of Alabama, 1954-1959

=== Clubs ===
- Alabama Writers Conclave-Member, President
- National League of American Pen Women-Member, President, 2nd Vice-president
- Poetry Society of Alabama-Member, President
- Birmingham Quill Club-Member, President
- The Birmingham Branch-Member, President
- Alabama Writers' Conclave-Member, President
- League of Women Voters-Member
- Alabama Federation of Women's Clubs-State chairman of the writers division

=== Publications ===
A few of the publications in which Mary B. Ward was featured:

- The Birmingham News
- The Birmingham Post-Herald
- The Birmingham Post
- The Saturday Evening Post
- The Saturday Review of Literature
- Sewanee Quarterly
- The New York Times
- The Washington Star
- Judge
- Fun-Shop

== Poems ==
A brief list of some of the poems that Mary B. Ward had published in various sources.

- “Friendship is Planted”
- “Birmingham”
- “For all of our leaders” Inauguration prayer poem
- “Teachers” Illustration and Poem
- “An Alabama Travelog-Alabama through the eyes of her poets”
- “The Bug who came to church”
- “The Hen who Sang Dixie”
- “Hester Kane Passes”
- “When Autumn Goes”
- “Aftermath of the Armistice”
- “After all these years”
- “In a South Carolina Garden”
- “Black Belt Lullaby”
- “Alchemy”
- “Old Hands”
- "Sunset Rehearsal"
- "Fragment from a Sea Libretto"

== Advertisements ==
- W.G. Patterson Cigar Co. Birmingham Distributors Ala.
- The Alabama National Life Insurance Company

== News Articles ==
- "Seaport has many spots of Interest"
- "Formation of First Clubs in State Told"
- "Body would have kiddies healthier as schools open"

== Death ==
Mary B. Ward died at the age of 91, on May 13, 1985, in Birmingham, Alabama. She was buried next to her husband in Elmwood Cemetery, in Birmingham, Alabama.
