= Alabama School of Fine Arts =

Public school in Birmingham, Alabama, United States

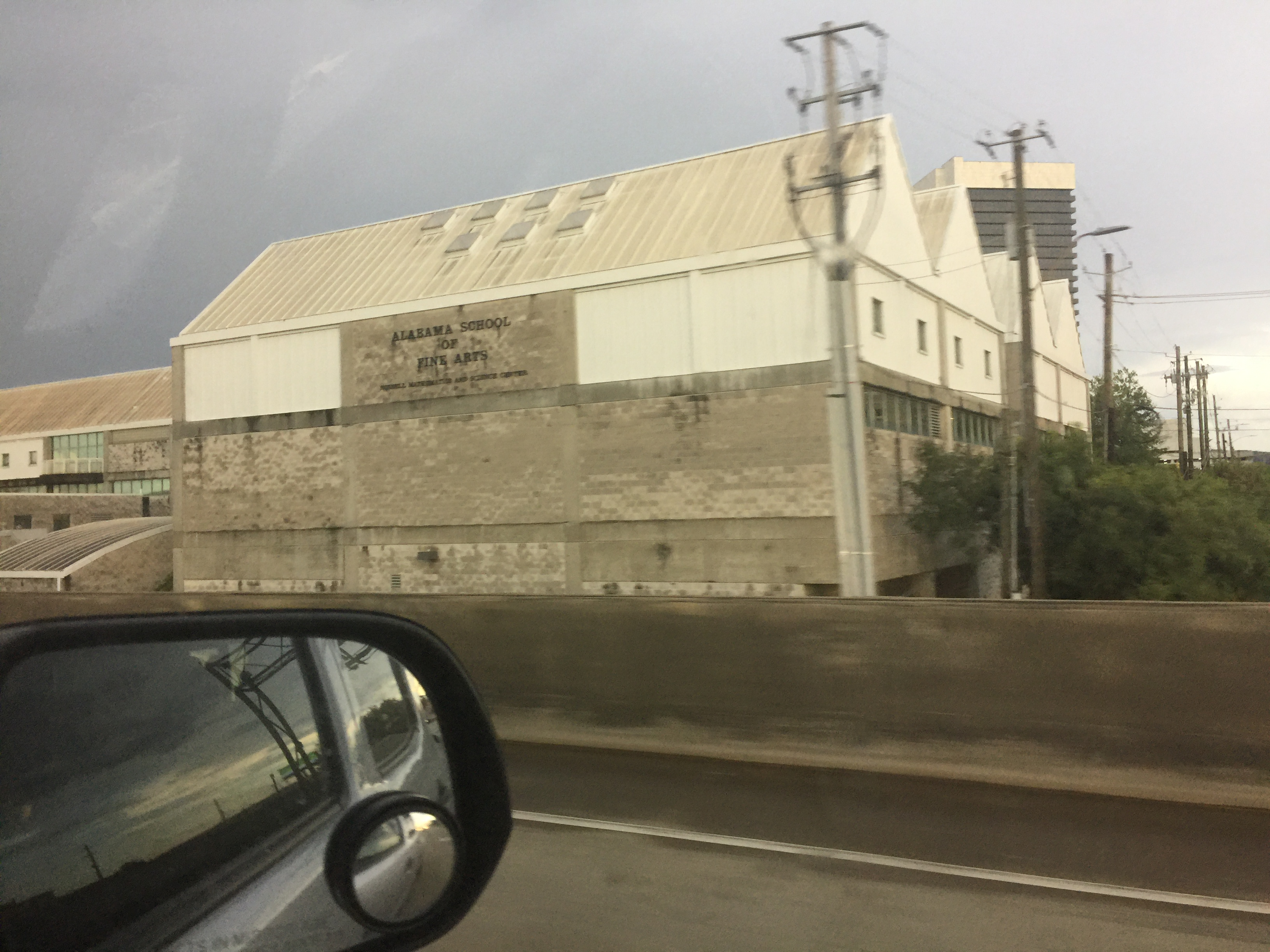

Location
- 1800 Reverend Abraham Woods Jr. Blvd; Birmingham, Alabama 35203; United States; 33.5211°N 86.8129°W

Information
- School type: Public; Partially residential
- Motto: Public Education with Passion
- Founded: 1971 (55 years ago)
- CEEB code: 010326
- President: Tim Mitchell
- Grades: 7–12
- Enrollment: 326 (2019)
- Language: English
- Website: www.asfa.k12.al.us

The Alabama School of Fine Arts (ASFA) is a public, tuition-free partially boarding state magnet middle and high school located in downtown Birmingham, Alabama, United States. It provides conservatory style and college-preparatory education to students in grades 7–12.

== Specialties ==
The six specialties of the school are music, visual arts, theatre arts, creative writing, math and science, and dance. The largest of these is math and science with an enrollment of around 100 students, with the other departments being smaller portions of the student body.

== History ==
The school began in 1968 with a group of Birmingham arts community leaders, James Hatcher and Peggy Beddow Cook, who acquired funding from Governor Lurleen Wallace to support instructional programs based in community arts agencies after school. The Alabama Legislature formally created the school with a resolution in 1971. The school was located at Samford University, with the dance program being located at UAB, but moved to Birmingham–Southern College in 1974. While there it was consolidated into five arts programs and a core academic program, staffed in part by the Birmingham City Schools.

The school moved to its own temporary downtown Birmingham campus in 1976. At this time the private, non-profit Alabama School of Fine Arts Foundation was established to raise funding to build an all-new campus complex.

A new law was approved by the Legislature in 1992 to provide for authorization for the school. The school moved into its new $10 million facility in the heart of Birmingham's cultural district the following year. A theater was added to the campus in 1995, followed by a mathematics and science wing in 1996. A creative writing wing was added in 1999. The ASFA Foundation began a new capital campaign in 2006 to raise money for the construction of a new theatre complex. The fundraising took many years, with construction lasting 17 months and costing $8.5 million. The new 500-seat theater, named in honor of Dorothy Jemison Day, was opened on March 30, 2012, with an ASFA theatre department production of Thornton Wilder's Our Town.

The ASFA theatre department was named as one of the nation's outstanding high school theatre programs by Stage Directions magazine in 2011.

According to Newsweek, it was #4 on its list of The Top High Schools in 2003.

== Admittance ==
Admission into the school is competitive. Prospective students must submit an application with test scores, transcripts, essays, and three letters of recommendation. Selected students then audition for their chosen department. For the arts departments, audition is through performance, portfolios, and interview. For the math and science department, audition is through interview and two rounds of testing.

With the school funded by the Alabama Legislature, in-state students pay no tuition. Students from outside the state are charged tuition.

== Campus ==
It includes dormitory facilities for students aged 11–18.

== Notable alumni ==
- Ajiona Alexus, actress
- Abigail Barlow, singer-songwriter and actress
- Emma Camp, journalist
- Suzanne Collins, writer; author of The Hunger Games
- Laverne Cox, actress and transgender activist
- Michael Dulin, pianist and composer
- Orenda Fink, musician
- Jennifer Hale, voice actress
- Brent Hinds, guitarist
- Robert Hoffman, actor
- Ashley M. Jones, poet
- Mitski Miyawaki, singer
- Erica Oyama, television writer and producer
- India Ramey, singer-songwriter
- Azure Ray, musicians
- Matt Slocum, keyboardist
- Ryan Swain, actor; most recently, Pose
- Maria Taylor, singer
