= Greenhaw =

Greenhaw is a surname. Notable people with the surname include:

- Art Greenhaw (born 1954), American musician
- Wayne Greenhaw (1940–2011), American writer and journalist
