= Andrew Glaze =

American writer (1920–2016)

- Born: April 21, 1920; Nashville, Tennessee, U.S.
- Died: February 7, 2016 (aged 95); Birmingham, Alabama, U.S.
- Occupations: Poet; playwright; novelist
- Spouse(s): Dorothy Elliott Shari, Adriana Keathley

Andrew Glaze (April 21, 1920 – February 7, 2016) was an American poet, playwright and novelist. Much of Glaze's poetry reflects his coming of age in the American South, and his eventual return there. He also lived and wrote in New York City for 31 years.

In New York City he became part of a circle of poets that included Oscar Williams, Norman Rosten, John Ciardi and William Packard.

== Personal history ==
Andrew Louis Glaze was born in Nashville, Tennessee, to Mildred Ezell Glaze and Dr. Andrew Louis Glaze M.D., a dermatologist. He grew up in Birmingham, Alabama, with a younger sister and brother, and attended Ramsay High School. He has been called both Andrew L. Glaze III, and Junior. His grandfather, Andrew Lewis Glaze, was a Confederate doctor during the Civil War.

After graduating from the Webb School in Bell Buckle, Tennessee, Glaze went on to major in English at Harvard College. Immediately after graduating from Harvard in 1942, Glaze enlisted in the United States Air Force to serve during World War II. He sailed to Europe on the RMS Queen Mary, which had been converted into a troop transport ship that could carry 15,000 men. "The American poet Andrew Glaze, then an Air Force lieutenant, stood on the foredeck and looked down on 'a quarter of a mile of human circles shooting craps'." When the war was over, while waiting his turn to be shipped back home, he attended the University of Grenoble. He died on February 7, 2016, in Birmingham, Alabama.

== Author ==
Glaze began to have success with his writing and between May 1950, and February 1956, Poetry magazine published seven of his poems. In 1951, Karl Shapiro, the editor of Poetry at the time, awarded him the magazine's Eunice Tietjens Memorial Prize At the same time, The New Yorker accepted one poem in 1950, and a second in 1955. He also had a short fiction piece appear in the 1953 4th Edition of New World Writing, and a poem in the 9th Edition in 1956. By January 19, 1957, The Saturday Review had accepted and published a poem titled Suwanee River.

In 1957, Glaze moved with wife and daughter to Greenwich Village in New York City. Glaze wrote a poem entitled As I walk mornings down Bleecker Street (later retitled, "Alleluia"), and another poem, Village Parade, which appeared in his first book. A son was born, but by 1961 the couple had divorced. The move to Manhattan, and subsequent divorce were later incorporated into Glaze's poem and book titled A City. Glaze's ex-wife later became Dorothy Elliott Shari, and went on to join The Living Theatre, for a six-year tour of Europe.

The move to New York may have been for many reasons, but it was hastened by a fear of reprisal for articles that Glaze had written as a reporter for the Birmingham Post-Herald. This was the dawn of the Civil rights movement, when racial segregation and Jim Crow laws were an everyday part of life in Birmingham. Glaze had testified against a deputy sheriff in defence of two black men. He also wrote about police brutality against demonstrators.

In 1962, Glaze married his second wife, dancer and actress, Adriana Keathley. At the time they met, she was in the original Broadway cast of Camelot. She later danced in the original cast of Michael Bennett's Broadway show Ballroom. In Andrew Glaze's Greatest Hits 1964–2004, Glaze notes that his poem Night Walk to a Country Theater (originally in The New Yorker) was written on a visit to Connecticut where his wife was performing. The couple settled into an apartment on the West side of Manhattan, and for many years Glaze bicycled across town to the British Tourist Authority office on 5th Avenue and 54th Street, where he worked as a Press Officer, writing travel stories. His morning bicycle journey to work, heading East along 54th Street, inspired the poem Reality Street which was published in the magazine The Atlantic. The evening trip home, going West on 53rd Street, resulted in the matching poem Fantasy Street, which appeared in The New Yorker. Glaze referred to them as "Two Odes, after the fashion of Milton's L'Allego and Il Penseroso". In 1978, Glaze did a reading and interview on WNYC radio, and stated that before The New Yorker published Fantasy Street, they sent a fact checker out to follow the entire route of the poem and check every location mentioned in it for accuracy. That same year, the reviewer in New York Times described Glaze's poetry as "wonderful company. I would like to just quote and quote."

Glaze's first poetry book, Damned Ugly Children was published in 1966. The book was well received in a review in The New York Times by Richard Eberhart, "... Glaze's poems are refreshing in the intellectual health they show ... He possesses a true richness of psychic perception". That same year the American Library Association named the book, "One of the most notable books of 1966". On the wave of this acclaim, Glaze was invited to participate in the 1967 Morris Gray Lecture Series at Harvard, and to sign their historic Morris Gray Lecture Signature Book. A few months later, in June 1968, Robert Mazzocco reviewed the book, together with one by poet Robert Bly, in The New York Review of Books. The header for the dual review was "Jeremiads at Half-Mast". The following summer of 1969, Glaze returned to the Bread Loaf Writers' Conference, this time as a guest faculty member.

In 1974, with the assistance of producer Joseph Papp, Glaze had a play, Kleinhoff Demonstrates tonight, produced at the Cricket Theatre in Minneapolis. Seven theatre groups performed the play between 1971 and 1988, and The Public Theater/New York Shakespeare Festival did a production with the rock star, Meat Loaf, in a leading role. A second play, The Man-Tree, had a staged reading in 1974 by Joseph Papp's The Public Theater. Two years later, The American Repertory Company of London, performed Glaze's play The Man-Tree in London.

Glaze's book I Am The Jefferson County Courthouse appeared in 1981 and was published and chosen by Library Journal as one of the best small press titles of that year. In the title poem, Glaze describes a busy Southern courthouse of the 1950s; and compares the Prosecutor to a bull frog on a lillypad, addressing a pond of "obedient" followers who wait for a signal "to sing".

Two of his plays were produced in 1983, Love is Nothing to Laugh At and Uneasy Lies. The latter was reviewed in the New York Post by William A. Raidy.

Between 1988 and 2002, Glaze prepared four new books of poetry for publication. The first to be published, in 1991, was Reality Street. In 1997, the second, a collection of Glaze's poems titled Carnal Blessings was a finalist for the T.S. Eliot poetry prize. A third book of poems went to print in 1998 with the title, Someone Will Go On Owing, selected poems, 1966–1992, and won the SIBA Award.

In 2002, the fourth book, Remembering Thunder was released, after which Glaze and his wife moved to his hometown of Birmingham, Alabama. This time Maxine Kumin commented, "His original and unsettling voice makes these poems a real triumph". Once he'd resettled in Birmingham, Glaze continued to write, and in 2004 his book Andrew Glaze: Greatest Hits 1964–2004 was published.

In 2012 the Alabama Writers' Conclave announced Glaze's appointment as the 11th Poet Laureate of Alabama, beginning in 2013. On November 5, 2012, he was officially commissioned by the Governor of Alabama in a ceremony at the State Capitol building in Montgomery.

On June 8, 2015, Glaze was an inaugural inductee into the Alabama Writer's Hall of Fame, along with Helen Keller, Harper Lee, and nine other writers with roots in Alabama.

In August 2015, his ninth book of poetry, a collection of previously unpublished poems titled Overheard in a Drugstore and other poems was released by NewSouth Books.

== Works ==
=== Poetry books ===
- Damned Ugly Children. Trident Press. 1966.
- The Trash Dragon of Shensi. Copper Beech Press. 1978.
- I Am the Jefferson County Courthouse and Other Poems. Thunder City Press. 1981. ISBN 9780918644114.
- Earth That Sings: On the Poetry of Andrew Glaze. Ford-Brown & Co. 1985. ISBN 9780918644169.
- Reality Street. St. Andrews Press. 1991. ISBN 9780932662972.
- Someone Will Go On Owing; Selected Poems, 1966–1992. Blackbelt Press. 1998. ISBN 9781881320913.
- Remembering Thunder. NewSouth Books. 2002. ISBN 9781588380777.
- Andrew Glaze: Greatest Hits 1964–2004. Pudding House Publications. 2005. ISBN 9781589983243.
- Overheard in a Drug Store and Other Poems. NewSouth Books. 2015. ISBN 9781603063999.

=== Poetry booklets ===
- The Token, a selection of verse. Birmingham Festival of the Arts. Winter, March 25, 1963. Volume 1 number 3. Library of Congress A618838,
- A Masque of Surgery. Menard Press, 1974. ISBN 9780903400121
- A City. Swamp Press. 1982. ISBN 9780934714181.

=== Artisan oversized folio ===
- LINES; Poems & Lithographs. Andrew Glaze and Umaña. Editions Heraclita. 1964.

=== Recordings, audio tape, videotape ===
- Poets Reading Their Poems; Andrew Glaze and Galway Kinnell. Poseidon Society Recording. Record # 1003. 1970.
- The Poets Corner. Interview by Steven Ford Brown and Philip Shirley. WBHM-FM Public Radio. April 11, 1982.
- A Journey. Music by Ned Rorem. The American Song Series. Volume 1 as Rosalind Rees Sings Ned Rorem. GSS Record 104. 1984.
- A Journey. Music by Ned Rorem. Hearing 32 Songs of Ned Rorem. Premier Recordings. 1995.
- A Journey. Music by Ned Rorem. Susan Graham Sings Ned Rorem. Erato. 2000.
- I Am the Jefferson County Courthouse & Other Poems, (April 12, 1982), Birmingham Festival Theatre.
- Andrew Glaze. WNYC Radio, June 2, 1978. He discusses his poems and reads some poems ... including "Lights," "Choir," "Becoming,"and "Fantasy Street."

=== Interviews with, quotes from, and discussions of, Andrew Glaze ===
- Companion to Southern Literature: Themes, Genres, Places, People ... , (reference to Andrew Glaze).
- Geniuses and Other Eccentrics: Photographing My Friends, (a reference to Andrew Glaze accompanied by a photo and his poem "A Choice").
- The Great American Poetry Bake-off, fourth series, Volume 4, (a discussion of Glaze's poetry).
- John Ciardi: A Biography, (Glaze interviewed about Ciardi).
- The Journal 12, "A Fierce White Light: One Perspective on the Poetry of Andrew Glaze", (interview with Andrew Glaze by Steven D. Conkle, Fall/Winter 1988–89).
- Light Quarterly, "A clear and bottomless well: the poetry of Andrew Glaze.(Interview)" (#48 pg. 55, Spring, 2005, ISSN 1064-8186).
- MENU 1, "An Interview with Andrew Glaze" by Steven Ford Brown (Winter 1985).
- The Poet's Dictionary: a handbook of prosody and poetic devices, (uses Glaze's poem "A Letter to David Matzke" as an example).
- The Reader, (interview with Andrew Glaze).
- Speak Truth to Power: the story of Charles Patrick, a Civil Rights Pioneer, (quotes from an interview, and newspaper articles).
- Walt Whitman Quarterly Review, (cites Glaze's poem "Whitman Saw it Crazily Shining").

=== Play productions and readings ===
- Kleinhoff Demonstrates Tonight. The Changing Scene Theatre, Denver, Colorado (1988). Public Theater/New York Shakespeare Festival, New York, New York (1974). Cricket Theatre, Minneapolis, MN (1974). Metropolitan Repertory Company, NY, NY (1984). Warren Robertson Studio (Revised version reading), NY, NY (1982). American Theatre for Actors, NY, NY (1982). Texas Drama Festival, Austin, TX (1971).
- Love is Nothing to Laugh At. American theatre for Actors (reading). NY, NY. 1983.
- The Man-tree. American Repertory Company of London, England. 1976. Public Theater/New York Shakespeare Festival (staged reading), NY, NY. 1974.
- Miss Pete. The American Place Theatre. New York City. 1966. The Players (club). New York City.
- Uneasy Lies. Southhill Productions. Gene Frankel Theatre. NY, NY. 1983.
