= Harper Lee Award =

Award for Alabama writers

- Description: Alabama's Distinguished Writer of the Year
- Location: Alabama
- Country: United States
- Presented by: Alabama Writers' Forum
- Website: www.writersforum.org/programs/harper-lee-award/

The Harper Lee Award for Alabama's Distinguished Writer of the Year is an annual award recognizing a writer who was born in Alabama or has spent their formative years there. It is named after Harper Lee, whose To Kill A Mockingbird has sold over 30 million copies.

The Harper Lee Award was established in 1998 and was first awarded to Albert Murray.

== Recipients ==
- 1998 — Albert Murray
- 1999 — Madison Jones
- 2000 — Helen Norris
- 2001 — Sena Jeter Naslund
- 2002 — Mary Ward Brown
- 2003 — Rodney Jones
- 2004 — Sonia Sanchez
- 2005 — Andrew Highway
- 2006 — Wayne Greenhaw
- 2007 — William Cobb
- 2008 — Rebecca Gilman
- 2009 — Rick Bragg
- 2010 — Carolyn Haines
- 2011 — Winston Groom
- 2012 — Fannie Flagg
- 2013 — Gay Talese
- 2014 — Mark Childress
- 2015 — Hank Lazer
- 2016 — E. O. Wilson
- 2017 — Brad Watson
- 2018 — Honorée Fanonne Jeffers
- 2019 — Daniel Wallace
- 2020 — Patti Callahan Henry
- 2021 — Angela Johnson
- 2022 — Cynthia Tucker
- 2023 — Joy Harjo
- 2024 — Tom Franklin
- 2025 — Cassandra King
