= Cassandra King =

American writer (born 1944)

Cassandra King (born 18 February 1944) is an American writer. She has written five novels: Making Waves in Zion (1995), The Sunday Wife (2002), The Same Sweet Girls (2005), Queen of Broken Hearts (2007), and Moonrise (2013).

King grew up in Pinckard, Alabama, and attended Alabama College (BA, 1967). She later returned to the same institution (now called the University of Montevallo) and obtained an MFA in 1988. She has taught at Jefferson State Community College, Gadsden State Community College, and the University of Montevallo.

King was married to a pastor, and then divorced. She based her novel The Sunday Wife on her experience. She then married writer Pat Conroy in 1998. After his death in 2016, King wrote a memoir, Tell Me a Story: My Life With Pat Conroy (2019), which was awarded the 2020 Southern Book Prize for nonfiction.

King won Troy University's Hall-Waters Prize in 2017, and the 2025 Harper Lee Award for Alabama's Distinguished Writer of the Year.
