= Ashley M. Jones =

American poet (born 1990)

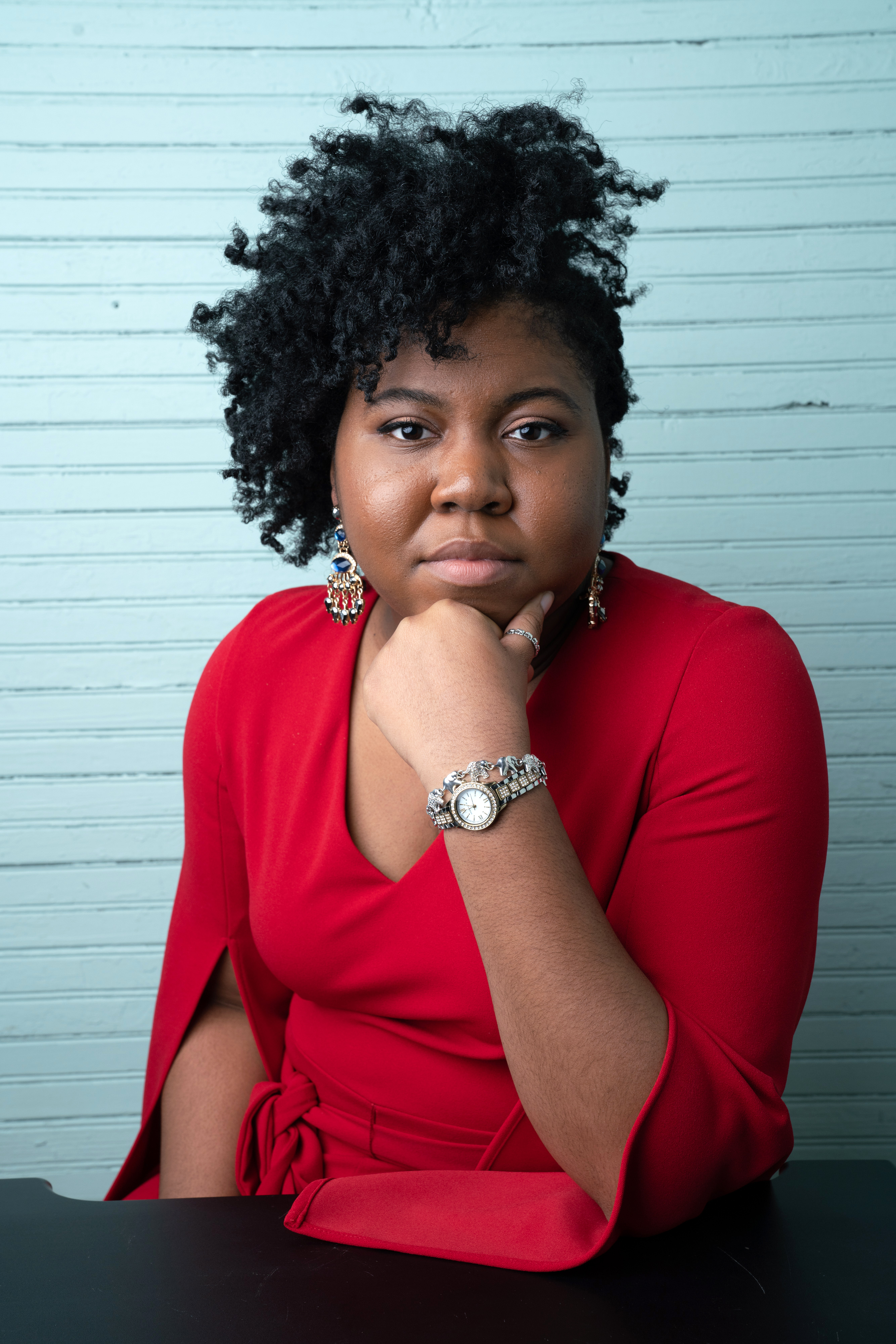
- Ashley M Jones at the 2019 Winter Symposium hosted by Southern Foodways Alliance
- Born: Ashley Michelle Jones; Birmingham, Alabama, US
- Occupation: Poet
- Website: ashleymjonespoetry.com

Ashley Michelle Jones (born 1990) is an American poet and activist. She is the first Black Poet Laureate of Alabama (2022–2026) and the youngest person to hold this position. She is the Associate Director of the University Honors Program at UAB and a Core faculty member at Converse University's MFA Program. Her poetry explores the impact the Deep South has on Black individuals and aspires to expose Black stories that were left behind due to Alabama's historical enslavement of Black men and women. She is the author of three books: Magic City Gospel, dark//thing, and Reparations Now!.

== Biography ==
=== Early life ===
Ashley M Jones was born in Birmingham, Alabama, to parents Donald and Jennifer Jones. Her father, John, was the chief of the Midfield Fire & Rescue Service and mother, Jennifer, worked as a social worker. Jones is the second eldest of four children, and they were raised in the Birmingham-area neighborhoods of Midfield and Roebuck. Jones's mother taught her to read and write by the age of three, and she began writing books by the time she was in second grade. At age eight, Jones found her love for poetry through poets such as Eloise Greenfield and began experimenting with poetry writing. In the sixth grade, the poem she wrote for a class caused her teacher to recommend that she apply to the Alabama School of Fine Arts. While in the Creative Writing program at the Alabama School of Fine Arts, Jones continued to study poetry and became particularly fascinated with Rita Dove's work, which inspired her to use her poetry as a medium to say important things. In high school, for her senior thesis, she modeled hers after Rita Dove's Thomas and Beulah, which allowed her to recognize that poetry was going to be her medium for storytelling. While growing up in Birmingham, Alabama, Jones struggled with recognizing her hometown as a place that was worthy of her love. She loathed the history of her home as well as the societal expectations that are associated with being from the South. However, as Jones matured, her view of the South as her home changed and she recognized the voice her Black Southern identity gave her.

=== Education ===
As a young child, Jones attended the EPIC Alternative Elementary school in Birmingham, Alabama, followed by the W.J. Christian Middle School. She was accepted into the creative writing program at the Alabama School of Fine Arts for her seventh-grade year and studied there until she graduated. Upon graduation, she obtained her bachelor's degree from the University of Alabama at Birmingham in 2012. Her bachelor's degree summa cum laude was in Creative Writing, with a Spanish minor (2012). Following her bachelor's degree, Jones decided to continue her education and received her M.F.A in poetry from Florida International University in 2017, where she was a John S. and James L. Knight Foundation Fellow.

=== Career ===
From 2013–2015, she served as the Official Poet for the City of Sunrise, Florida's Free Little Libraries Initiative .

Jones has been a faculty member in the Creative Writing Department of the Alabama School of Fine Arts since 2015. She also serves as a faculty member for Converse University's Low Residency MFA Program in Spartanburg, South Carolina.

On December 1, 2021, Jones was named Alabama's Poet Laureate for 2022–2026. She is the youngest individual to ever receive this honor, as well as the only black person.

Jones has published three books of poetry, Magic City Gospel (2017), dark//thing (2019), and Reparations Now!(2021).

Jones serves as a board member for the Alabama Writer's Cooperative and the Alabama Writers Forum. She is also a co-director of the PEN American chapter in Birmingham. She is also the founder of a nonprofit organization called Magic City Poetry Festival. In 2022 Jones started the Alabama Poetry Delegation to allow poets in Alabama to share their work with others in the state.

=== Activism ===
Jones is a dedicated activist that focuses on social justice initiatives. She worked with a worldwide program called One Hundred Thousand Poets for Change, which sponsored an event where people across the globe shared their work that focused on social justice. In her hometown of Birmingham, Alabama, she helped turn this event into a fundraiser that benefitted multiple organizations. She worked with immigrant justice, where inmates within the Etowah County Detention Center wrote letters that were read. At this event, Jones helped this organization raise over one thousand dollars, and since then she has used her art to raise money to enact social change. Jones also started a nonprofit organization called Magic City Poetry Festival, which raised money by writing poems for people if they had proof of donation. She uses her art form to raise money to help people within her community.

== Poetic style and influences ==
Jones's main mission is to make poetry something that everyone can enjoy. She said, "For too long, poetry has been deemed a purely academic pursuit, and it has been kept behind an ivory gate, but where the heartbeat of poetry has always lived is in the souls of poets. I hope to celebrate that soul work for the next four years and beyond." Her poetry covers various different subject matters. She has written both celebrations of love and family and deeper works exploring the atrocities that Black men and women face in America. She has written sonnets that are based in love, but explore darker realities such as lynchings and violent acts toward the Black population in America. Although she recognizes the traumatic past the South possesses for Black people, her poetry now serves as a celebration of the region she calls home. Growing up, she struggled to take ownership of her southern identity; however, she has now found a way to recognize this part of herself through her poetry. She said, "So for me, loving my hometown and my home state includes a knowledge and a desire to investigate and interrogate our history and all of our failures and setbacks." Through self-reflection, Jones recognized that her poetry detailing the Black experience in the South is the most authentic reflection of herself as an author.

Jones found poetic inspiration from writers such as Lucille Clifton, Gwendolyn Brooks, Audre Lorde, and Kevin Young. She is also inspired by musicians including John Legend, Jill Scott, Marc Anthony, Stevie Wonder, and Usher.

== Selected works ==
=== Poetry collections ===
==== Magic City Gospel ====
This is Jones' first collection of poetry, and it was published in January 2017. This work received a silver medal in poetry in the 2017 Independent Publisher Book Awards. Magic City Gospel explores blackness, history, and identity through Jones's personal lens. She examines historical and personal accounts of the history of her home state, Alabama, and explores her life experiences as a native Southerner. She believes this collection serves as a "Love letter to Birmingham, Alabama," and showcases her conflicting affection for the region she calls home. Throughout this book of poetry she uses her poetic voice to create works that examine the violent past of the Southern region while also discussing the present-day nature of the South, and how this intersection personally affects her.

- Jones, Ashley M. (2017). Magic city gospel: poems. Spartanburg, SC. ISBN 978-1-938235-26-9. OCLC 945355149.

==== dark//thing ====
Jones's second book is dark//thing which was published in February 2019. This work won the Lena-Miles Wever Todd Prize for Poetry. This collection of poetry seeks to explore the way our society perceives different aspects of Blackness, but does not truly see them. This book, at its core, is an exploration of what it truly means to be Black in America, and the impact that has on human experience. Jones seeks to examine what allows Black people to be seen as less than whole, and the racist ideologies that uphold this sense of otherness. She affirms elements of Blackness and condemns the ideals that have and continue to allow Black people to be treated as lesser than.

- Jones, Ashley M. (2019). dark // thing. Warrensburg, Missouri. ISBN 978-0-8071-7060-1. OCLC 1053863377.

==== Reparations Now! ====
Reparations Now! is Jones's third published collection of poetry, which was released in September 2021. At the very heart of this book, Jones is asking for what is owed to the descendants of enslaved people throughout America. Jones offers depictions of the atrocities Black people still face in America: violence, police brutality, and white silence, all while still celebrating the Black culture and joy that has made her who she is. She is offering an exploration of a violent past while still showcasing glimmers of a hopeful future for Black men and women across not only the South but America as a whole.

- Jones, Ashley M. (2021). Reparations now! : poems (First ed.). Spartanburg, SC. ISBN 978-1-938235-86-3. OCLC 1237649189.

=== Essays ===
- "When God Calls My Name" (Scalawag Magazine)
- "A Haiku for Sister Sonia Sanchez" (Poetry Birmingham Literary Journal)
- "Anything She Didn't Want to Do, She Don't Have To: Finding Voice, Agency, and Blackness in the Life and Poems of Lucille Clifton" (Mentor and Muse)
- "KKK Editorial is America's Problem, Not Just Alabama's" (CNN)
- "Heaven is a Black Woman's Smile" (River Mouth Review)
- "Amanda Gorman Reminded America What Poetry Can Do" (CNN)

== Awards and honors ==
Jones has received multiple awards throughout her career. They include:

- The 2015 Rona Jaffe Foundation Writer's Award.
- The 2018 Lucille Clifton Poetry Prize from Backbone Press
- Finalist in the Ruth Lilly Dorothy Sargent Rosenburg Fellowship.
- The Lucille Clifton Legacy Award from St. Mary's College in Maryland
- Poetry fellowship from the Alabama State Council of the Arts
- The 2020 Alabama Library Association Author Award
