= Poet Laureate of Alabama =

- Incumbent; Ashley M. Jones since 2021
- Type: Poet Laureate
- Formation: 1930
- First holder: Samuel Minturn Peck

The poet laureate of Alabama is the poet laureate for the U.S. state of Alabama. The position was established in 1931 by an act of the Alabama Legislature. Poets laureate, who must have been Alabama residents for at least 15 years, are chosen by the governor, and serve 4-year terms.

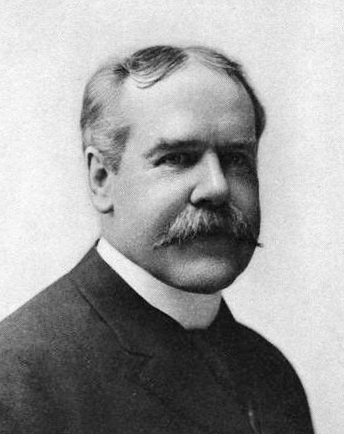
Samuel Minturn Peck was the first poet laureate.

== List of poets laureate ==
#	Poet laureate	Term began	Term ended	Appointed by	Notes
1	Samuel Minturn Peck (died 1938)	12 June 1930	3 May 1938 (death)	Gov. Bibb Graves	
2	Mary B. Ward	21 November 1954	1958	Gov. Gordon Persons	
3	Elbert Calvin Henderson (1903–1974)	21 December 1959	15 September 1974 (death)	Gov. John Patterson	
4	William Young Elliott (1902–1997)	August 1975	1982	Gov. George Wallace	
5	Carl Patrick Morton (1920–1994)	1983	1987	Lt. Gov. William Baxley	
6	Morton Dennison Prouty, Jr. (died 1992)	1988	1991	Gov. H. Guy Hunt	
7	Ralph Hammond	1992	1995	Gov. H. Guy Hunt	
8	Helen Friedman Blackshear (1911–2003)	1 January 1995	1999	Gov. Jim Folsom, Jr.	
9	Helen Norris	1999	2003	Gov. Don Siegelman	
10	Sue Walker	August 2003	December 2012	Gov. Bob Riley	
11	Andrew Glaze	2013	7 February 2016 (death)	Gov. Robert J. Bentley	
12	Jennifer Horne	2017	2021	Gov. Kay Ivey	
13	Ashley M. Jones	2022	2026	Gov. Kay Ivey	
14	Jacqueline Allen Trimble	2026	Present	Gov. Kay Ivey	

== See also ==
- List of U.S. state poets laureate
- United States Poet Laureate
- Poet laureate
