= Don Noble =

American poet

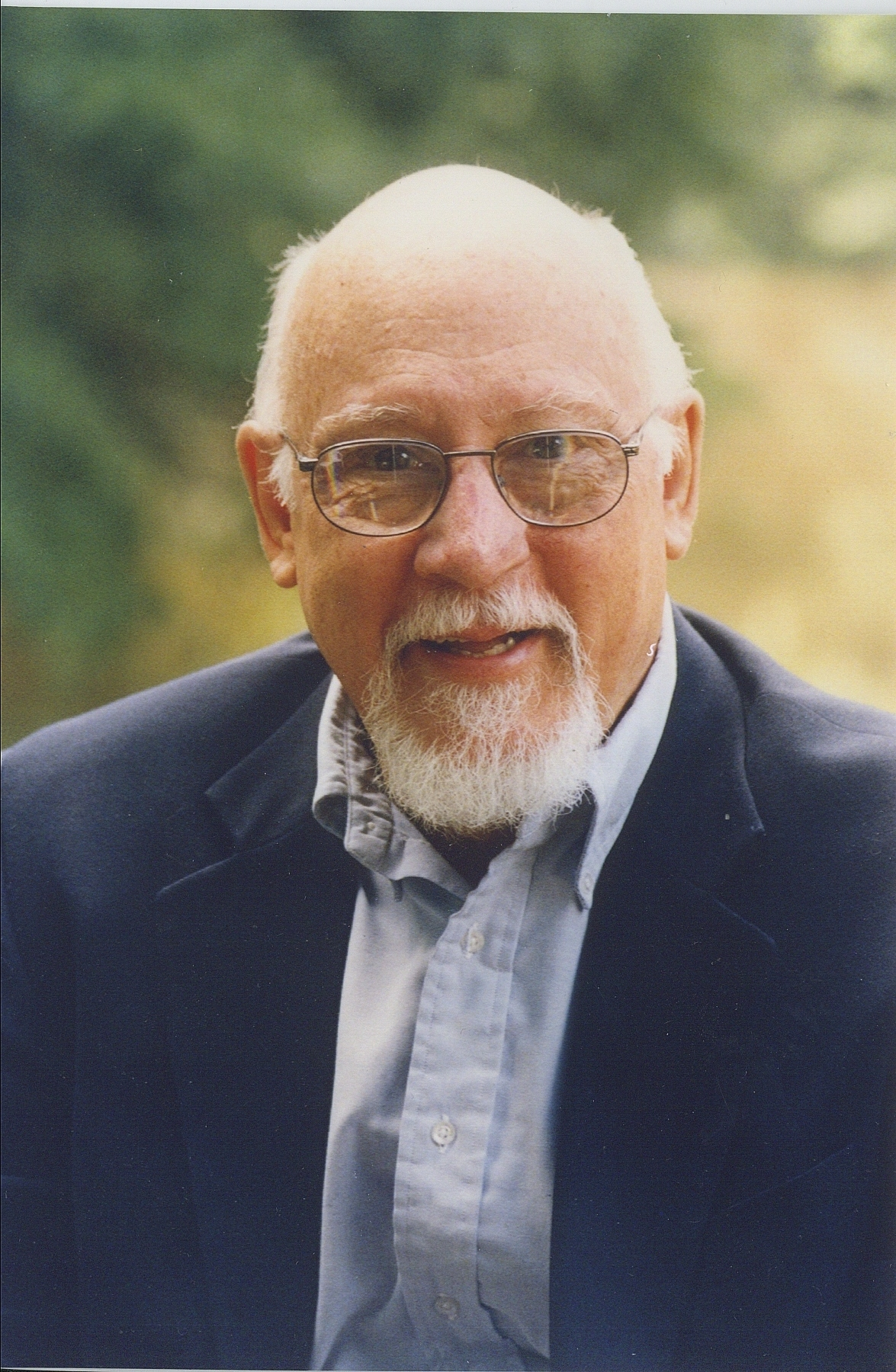
- Don Noble in 2022
- Born: December 11, 1941 Portsmouth, Virginia, U.S.
- Occupation: journalist, essayist, literary critic
- Education: University at Albany, SUNY; University of North Carolina at Chapel Hill
- Spouse: Jennifer Horne

Don Noble is an Alabama writer and literary critic. He is host of the long-running Alabama Public Television author interview program Bookmark, the book reviewer for Alabama Public Radio, and a professor emeritus of English at the University of Alabama.

== Education and career ==
Noble earned bachelor’s and master’s in English at University at Albany, SUNY. He then earned a doctorate in Southern literature at the UNC Chapel Hill. He relocated to Tuscaloosa in 1969 and taught American literature at the University of Alabama until 2001.

In addition to his teaching career, Noble is the author of numerous works of literary criticism, including books about Harper Lee's To Kill a Mockingbird, John Steinbeck, and F. Scott Fitzgerald. He has also edited anthologies of fiction, including one with his wife Jennifer Horne, a past Poet Laureate of Alabama. In 2023, he began a podcast titled "Alabama Aloud" that presents humorous short fiction by writers from the state.

Noble has served on the boards of the Alabama Humanities Alliance, the Alabama Writers' Forum, and the Alabama School for the Fine Arts.

== Awards ==
His awards include a regional Emmy for Achievement in Screenwriting with Brent Davis for a documentary on Alabama writer William Bradford Huie. Noble was the recipient of the 2000 Eugene Current-Garcia Award, the 2013 Wayne Greenhaw Service Award from the Alabama Humanities Alliance, and the 2017 Governor’s Arts Award given by the Alabama State Council on the Arts.

== Personal life ==
Horne is married to poet and writer Jennifer Horne, a former Poet Laureate of Alabama. They live in Cottondale, Alabama.

== Published works ==
- Noble (Ed.), Don (2004). Climbing Mt. Cheaha: Emerging Alabama Writers. Livingston: Livingston Press. ISBN 9781931982399.
- Noble (Ed.), Don with Jennifer Horne (2017). Belles' Letters 2: Contemporary Stories by Alabama Women. Livingston: Livingston Press. ISBN 9781604891836.
- Noble (Ed.), Don (2008). A State of Laughter: Comic Fiction from Alabama. Livingston: Livingston Press. ISBN 9781604890044.
- Noble (Ed.), Don (2009). Zelda and Scott/Scott and Zelda: New Essays on the Fitzgeralds’ Life, Work and Times. Albany: Whitston Publishing Co. ISBN 9780878755165.
- Noble, Don (2009). Critical Insights: To Kill a Mockingbird. Amenia: Salem Press. ISBN 9781587656187.
- Noble (Ed.), Don (2009). Alabama Noir. Brooklyn: Akashic Books. ISBN 9781617758089.
- Noble, Don (2010). Critical Insights: John Steinbeck. Amenia: Salem Press. ISBN 9781587657030.
- Noble, Don (2010). Critical Insights: F. Scott Fitzgerald. Amenia: Salem Press. ISBN 9781587656934.
