= Jennifer Horne (poet) =

American poet

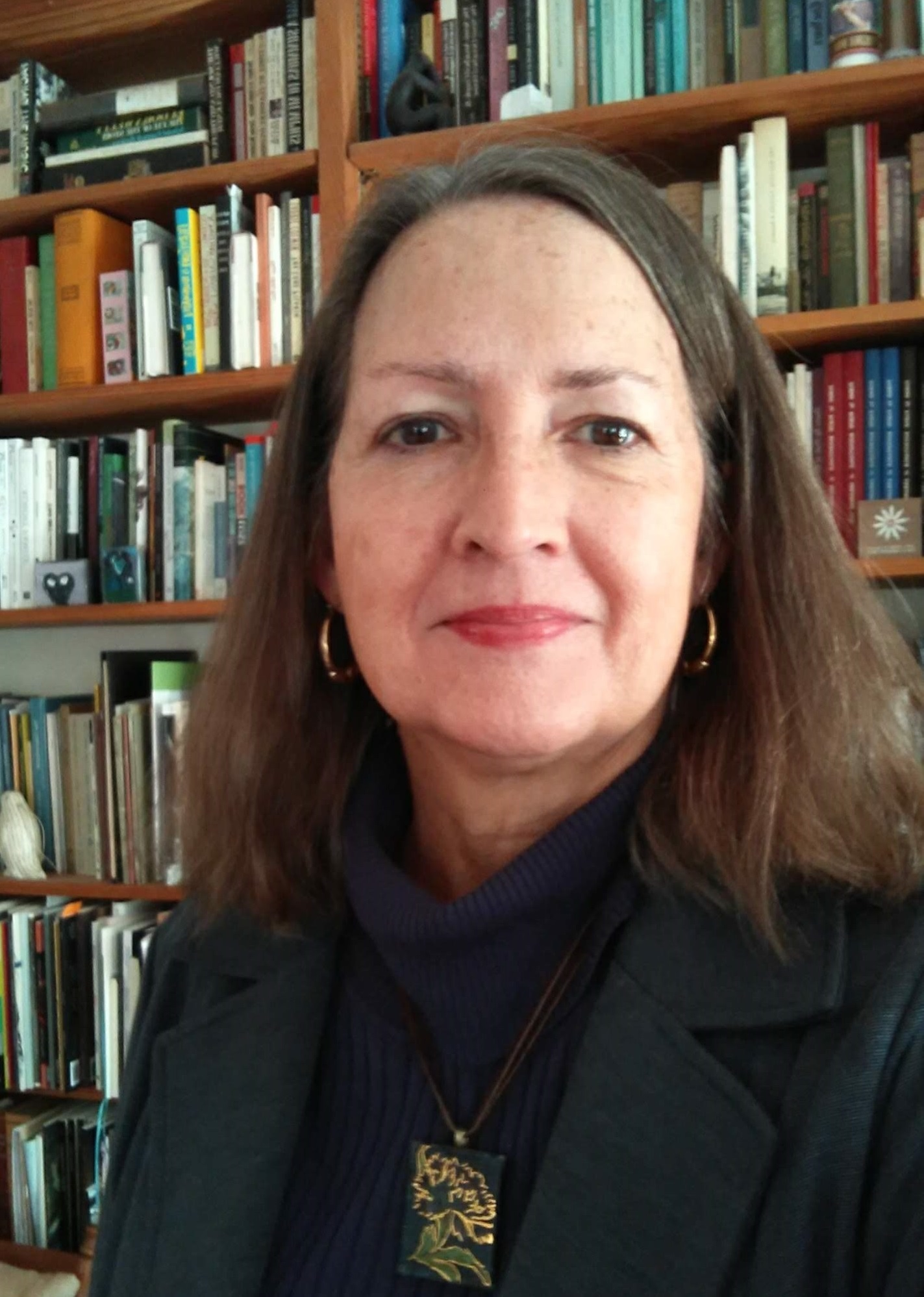
- Jennifer Horne in 2022
- Born: Arkansas, U.S.
- Occupation: writer, poet
- Education: Hendrix College (BA); University of Alabama (MA, MFA)
- Genre: poetry; creative non-fiction; fiction; essay
- Spouse: Don Noble

Jennifer Horne is an American writer of poetry, fiction, and non-fiction who served as the Poet Laureate of Alabama from 2017 to 2021.

== Early life and education ==
Horne was born in Little Rock, Arkansas. She received a BA in the Humanities from Hendrix College. At the University of Alabama, Horne has received an MA in English, an MFA in Creative Writing, and an MA in Community Counseling.

== Career ==
Horne has published three collections of poetry: Bottle Tree, Little Wanderer, and Borrowed Light. In 2014, she published the short story collection Tell the World You’re a Wildfower. She has edited or co-edited four volumes of poetry, essays, and stories. This includes a collection of her mother's poetry Root & Plant & Bloom: Poems by Dodie Walton Horne, which she co-edited with her sister. In 2024, she published a full-length biography of Sara Mayfield, who wrote biographies of H. L. Mencken and his wife Sara Haardt and of F. Scott and Zelda Fitzgerald. Publishers Weekly wrote: "Well-researched and compassionately written, this beguiling tale of madness and literature shines."

Her work has appeared in the journals Amaryllis, Arkansas Literary Forum, the Birmingham Arts Journal, Carolina Quarterly, Fan magazine, Lonzie's Fried Chicken, the Mars Hill Review, the New Delta Review, Noccalula, Old Red Kimono, Poets On, Sycamore Review, Thicket, and Voices International.

In 2018, she was the Visiting Writer-in-Residence at Lenoir-Rhyne College. Alabama governor Kay Ivey named Horne the state's poet laureate on November 1, 2017, a post Horne held until 2022. During the months of COVID-19 lockdowns, Horne posted a "mid-week poetry break" every Wednesday as part of her service as poet laureate.

== Awards ==
Horne has received fellowships from the Alabama State Council on the Arts and from the Seaside Institute in Florida. In 2015 she delivered the Rhoda Ellison Lecture at Huntingdon College in Montgomery, Alabama. She has also been the recipient of the Tuscaloosa Arts Council's Druid City Literary Arts Award. In 2021 she was named the Poet of the Year by the Alabama State Poetry Society.

== Personal life ==
Horne is married to writer and book critic Don Noble. They live in Cottondale, Alabama.

== Published works ==
- Horne (Ed.), Jennifer (2003). Working the Dirt: An Anthology of Southern Poets. Montgomery: NewSouth Books. ISBN 978-1588381316.
- Horne, Jennifer (2010). Bottle Tree. Cincinnati: WordTech Editions. ISBN 9781934999868.
- Horne, Jennifer (2014). Tell the World You're a Wildflower: Short Stories. Tuscaloosa: University of Alabama Press. ISBN 9780817318451.
- Horne, Jennifer (2016). Little Wanderer: Poems. Ennistymon, Ireland: Salmon Poetry. ISBN 9781910669334.
- Horne (Ed.), Jennifer and Don Noble (2017). Belles' Letters 2: Contemporary Stories by Alabama Women. Livingston: Livingston Press. ISBN 9781604891836.
- Horne, Jennifer (2024). Odyssey of a Wandering Mind: The Strange Tale of Sara Mayfield, Author. Tuscaloosa: University of Alabama Press. ISBN 9780817361365.
