= The Sunday Wife =

2002 novel by Cassandra King

- Author: Cassandra King
- Language: English
- Publisher: Hyperion Books
- Publication date: 2002
- Publication place: United States

The Sunday Wife is a 2002 novel by Cassandra King, published by Hyperion Books. The title character (and narrator) is Dean Lynch, married to Ben Lynch, a Methodist minister in the Florida panhandle. It is semi-autobiographical, based on King's own failed marriage to a preacher.

The Sunday Wife was a Book Sense pick and a Salt Lake Libraries Readers’ Choice Award nominee.
