= Michael Dulin =

American pianist and composer

- Born: Birmingham, Alabama
- Genres: Classical, Neo-Classical, Contemporary Instrumental, New Age, Smooth Jazz
- Occupations: Composer, Pianist, Recording Artist
- Years active: 1998 – present
- Labels: Equity Digital, Equity Music Group
- Website: MichaelDulin.com

Michael Dulin is an American pianist and composer. In addition to performing his original music, Dulin has appeared both solo and with orchestra in performances of classical music. He has also toured as keyboardist with the Motown group, the Temptations.

Four of Dulin's albums The One I Waited For, Atmospheres, Follow The River and Timeless II have reached the #1 spot on the Zone Music Reporter (formerly New Age Reporter or NAR) Top 100 Radio Airplay Chart. Two of his albums have been awarded the New Age Reporter's NAR Lifestyle Music Award in 2004, its inaugural year for Atmospheres (Best Instrumental Album – Piano), and again in 2005 for Timeless (Best Neo-Classical Album). Dulin was also a finalist in the Carnegie Hall International Piano Competition in 1985, and was awarded the Silver Medal in the Second Annual International Audio-Video Competition in New York.

It has been noted that while Dulin has a strong classical music background, his music is reminiscent of New Age. Dulin has cited Philip Aaberg, David Lanz, Keiko Matsui and Clara Ponty as some of the artists whose work he has admired. Dulin and his business partner, Dan Whiteside, own and operate Equity Digital, a music label, and PSI Digital, a digital recording facility both located in Birmingham, Alabama.

== Early life ==
Dan Michael Dulin was born in Birmingham, Alabama, where he still resides. Mike's dad worked for US Steel, and his mom worked in her father's furniture store and then in a doctor's office filing insurance claims. Mike has one sister, Brenda, who is three years older. In an early interview Dulin has stated that in his formative years as an instrumentalist, he would play the piano by ear and learned to sight read at a much later date. He had started improvising on the piano when he was 8–9 years old. He has also credited his accomplishments to his parents who had made a lot of sacrifices to help him follow his dreams, including a gift of a Steinway grand piano on his 15th birthday.

Dulin is a graduate of the Alabama School of Fine Arts. He studied piano performance at Birmingham-Southern College where he was twice awarded the Alys Robinson Stephens Piano Prize. Subsequently, he has studied at The Juilliard School in New York with concert pianist Adele Marcus.

== Music career ==
In 1998, Dulin made his debut with Beethoven, Mendelssohn & Debussy, a solo piano performance of the works of classical composers Ludwig van Beethoven, Felix Mendelssohn and Claude Debussy. This was followed up by A Nice Boy From Brooklyn in 1999, a collection of songs by composer George Gershwin.

In 2002, Dulin released his third album The One I Waited For, a debut of Dulin's original piano compositions. The music on the contemporary instrumental music featured Dulin's solo piano performance with the usage of occasional synth work. The album peaked at #1 in May 2003 on the ZMR Top 100 Radio Airplay Chart, where it stayed for 3 months The album was #3 on the ZMR Top 100 Airplay Chart for 2003.

Dulin continued to explore the New Age genre on his 2003 release Atmospheres, his second release of original piano based compositions. The album peaked at #1 in September 2003 on the ZMR Top 100 Radio Airplay Chart and was #9 on the ZMR Top 100 Airplay Chart for 2003.

Later in the same year, Dulin collaborated with Chuck Offutt on Balance of Nature. The album featured Offutt on Native American flutes and Dulin on piano and keyboards. The inspiration for the album came from a week Dulin spent in the mountains of North Carolina. Dulin has stated that the music was not intended to be representative of Native American culture, but the wooden flutes were the perfect medium to express the beauty of the untouched world.

In 2004, Dulin released Timeless, a collection of classics. He has taken familiar melodies from the 19th and 20th century piano repertoire and gives them a new age styled interpretation. In an interview, Dulin had expressed his views that classical music was dying, and needs to be brought back to the attention of the general public. By updating some of these easily accessible pieces, he has made a step in that direction without compromising the integrity of the music in any way. The album peaked at #12 on ZMR in Dec 2004 on the ZMR Top 100 Radio Airplay Chart, and was #86 on the ZMR Top 100 Airplay Chart for 2005.

Dulin released an album of Christmas standards in 2005 with Christmas at Our House. The album peaked at #9 in Dec 2005 on the ZMR Top 100 Radio Airplay Chart.

In 2008, Dulin released his fourth album of original material, and his third as a solo recording artist, on Follow The River. In an interview Dulin has stated that the inspiration for the album came from his observation that the journey of life is like a river. The main melody on the title track that opens the album also came to Dulin when he was sitting on a rock looking down at the river. It has been noted that while there are elements of classical music, the album exhibits a much wider range of influences including contemporary instrumental, new age and smooth jazz. Dulin has also dedicated a song each to his mother and to the late recording artist and pianist Laurie Z. The album peaked at #1 in June 2008 on the ZMR Top 100 Radio Airplay Chart, and was ranked #10 on the ZMR Top 100 Airplay Chart for 2008.

In 2011, Dulin released Timeless II, the follow-up to his 2004 release, Timeless. On this album, Dulin has moved away from the New Age genre, back to his Classical music roots with interpretations of works by Bach, Beethoven, Rachmaninoff, Chopin, and Saint- Saens. The instrumentation is based on the piano with strings, organ, and other non-piano sounds complementing with subtle accents. The album peaked at #1 in April 2011 on the ZMR Top 100 Radio Airplay Chart, and was ranked #8 on the ZMR Top 100 Airplay Chart for 2011.

Dulin released These Are the Moments in 2012, a collection of his original music and arrangements from six of his releases from 2002 to 2012. The album is a collection of Dulin's contemporary instrumentals and his performances of classical music. The album has been featured in the Best New Age Albums in 2012.

Dulin's arrangement of Erik Satie's Gymnopedie #3, Simply Satie, was featured in the soundtrack of 2014's Magician: The Astonishing Life and Work of Orson Welles by Academy Award-winning director Chuck Workman.

In 2015, Dulin released My Beloved, another album of original compositions dedicated to his wife, Jan. It was named 2015's Best Solo Piano Album by Enlightened Piano Radio.

His music has also been heard in an episode of the final season of NBC's hit sitcom Parks and Recreation.

== Discography ==
Title	Album details	Role	Release date	Label
Beethoven, Mendelssohn & Debussy	Solo	Primary Artist	1998	Equity Music Group
A Nice Boy from Brooklyn	Solo	Primary Artist	1999	Equity Digital
The One I Waited For	Solo	Primary Artist	2002	Equity Digital
Atmospheres	Solo	Primary Artist	2003	Equity Digital
Balance of Nature	with Chuck Offutt	Primary Artist	2003	Equity Digital
Timeless	Solo	Primary Artist	2004	Equity Digital
Christmas at Our House	Solo	Primary Artist	2005	Equity Digital
Follow the River	Solo	Primary Artist	2008	Equity Digital
Timeless II	Solo	Primary Artist	2011	Equity Digital
These Are the Moments	Solo	Primary Artist	2012	Equity Digital
My Beloved	Solo	Primary Artist	2015	Equity Digital
