= Patti Callahan Henry =

American novelist

- File:PattiHenryPortrait.jpg
- Occupation: Novelist
- Alma Mater: Auburn University; Georgia State University
- Genre: Fiction, historic fiction

Website

Patti Callahan Henry is a New York Times, Globe and Mail, and USA Today bestselling author of eighteen novels, including her most recent, The Secret Book of Flora Lea. She is also a podcast host and public speaker. Her novels often explore themes of love, loss, personal transformation, and the power of storytelling.

== Early life and education ==
Henry attended Auburn University, earning a Bachelor of Science in Nursing, and later obtained a Master of Science in Nursing from Georgia State University. She worked as a Pediatric Clinical Nurse Specialist before becoming a full-time writer.

== Career ==
Henry's writing career began with her debut novel Losing the Moon, which marked the start of her career in fiction. She has since authored eighteen additional novels, including The Secret Book of Flora Lea (2023), Surviving Savannah (2021), and Becoming Mrs. Lewis (2018). Her books have also been translated into numerous languages.

Henry's work in historical fiction is notable for its in-depth exploration of lesser-known stories and figures. For example, Surviving Savannah is based on the true story of the Steamship Pulaski, often referred to as "The Titanic of the South." Her novel Becoming Mrs. Lewis explores the love story between C.S. Lewis and Joy Davidman, offering a fictionalized account of their relationship.

In addition to her fiction, Henry has contributed essays and short stories to various anthologies and publications, including Southern Living, PINK, Writer's Digest, and Garden and Gun. She has also written an Audible Original, Wild Swan, which is a novella about Florence Nightingale, narrated by Tony Award winner Cynthia Erivo.

== Podcasting and public speaking ==
Patti Callahan Henry is the co-host and co-creator of the weekly online show and podcast Friends and Fiction, which features New York Times bestselling authors Mary Kay Andrews, Kristy Woodson Harvey, and Kristin Harmel. The show, which airs live every Wednesday evening at 7:00 PM EST, provides insights into the world of writing and publishing and has featured numerous guest authors such as Amor Towles, Kristin Hannah, Jodi Picoult, Elin Hilderbrand and William Kent Krueger.

Henry has also hosted podcast series that complement her novels, such as "The Untold Story Behind Surviving Savannah" and "Behind the Scenes of Becoming Mrs. Lewis," where she explores the real-life stories and research behind her books.

== Awards and recognition ==
Henry has received several awards for her contributions to literature, including:

- The Christy Award for Book of the Year (2019)
- The Alabama Library Association Book of the Year (2019)
- The Harper Lee Distinguished Writer of the Year (2020)

== Bibliography ==
1. Losing the Moon (2004) ISBN 9780451211958
2. Where the River Runs (2005) ISBN 9780451215055
3. When Light Breaks (2006) ISBN 9780451218346
4. Between the Tides (2007) ISBN 9780451221148
5. The Art of Keeping Secrets (2008)
6. Driftwood Summer (2009)
7. Coming Up for Air (2011)
8. And Then I Found You (2013)
9. The Stories We Tell (2014)
10. The Idea of Love (2015)
11. The Bookshop at Water's End (2017)
12. Becoming Mrs. Lewis (2018)
13. The Favorite Daughter (2019)
14. The Perfect Love Song: A Christmas Story (2019)
15. Wild Swan (2020)
16. Surviving Savannah (2021)
17. Once Upon a Wardrobe (2021)
18. The Secret Book of Flora Lea (2023)
19. The Story She Left Behind (2025)
