= Wayne Greenhaw =

American journalist

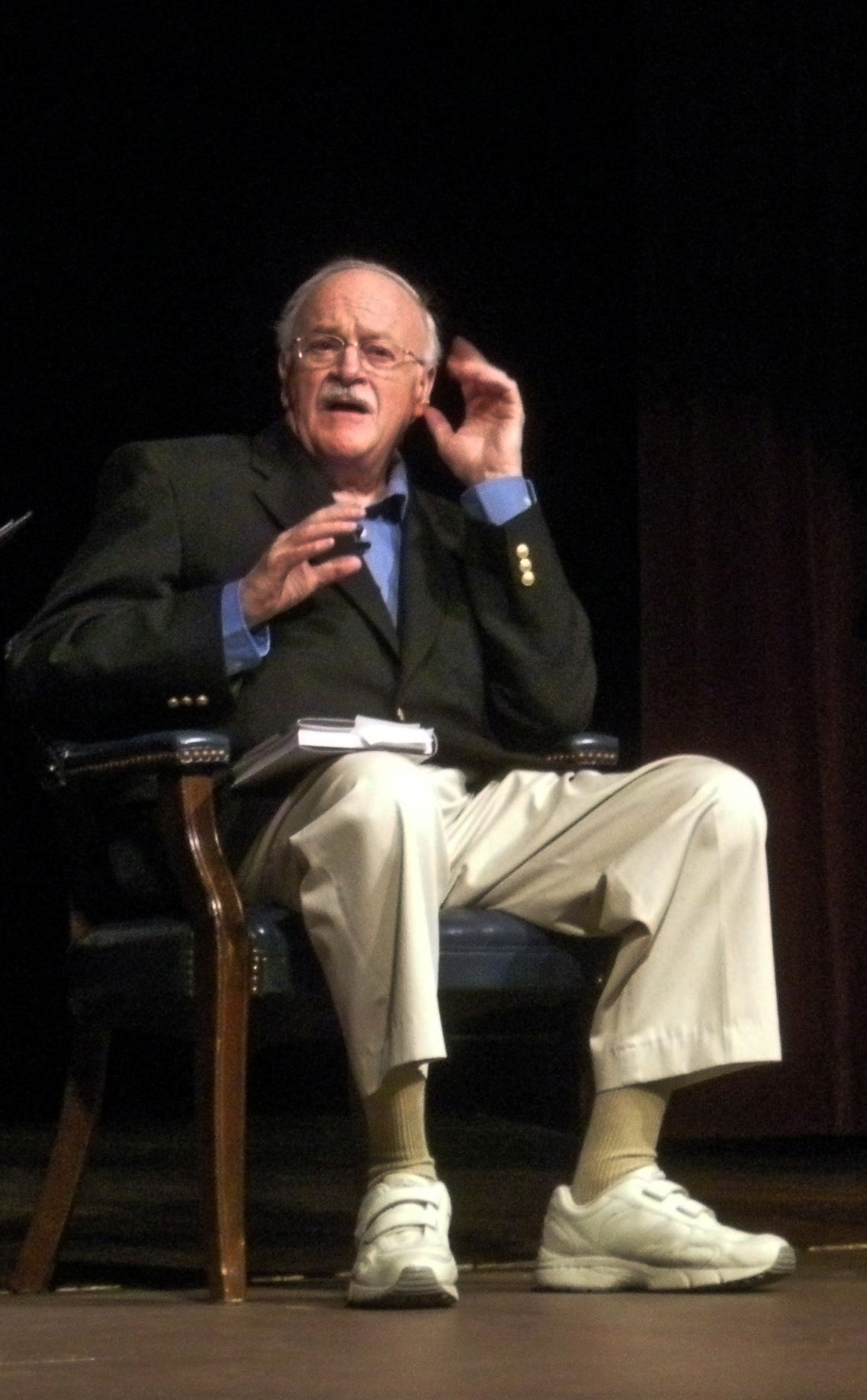
Greenhaw visiting Snead State on February 23, 2011

Harold Wayne Greenhaw (February 17, 1940 – May 31, 2011) was an American writer and journalist. The author of 22 books who chronicled changes in the American South from the civil rights movement to the rise of a competitive Republican Party, he is known for his works on the Ku Klux Klan and the exposition of the My Lai Massacre of 1968. Greenhaw wrote for various Alabamian newspapers and magazines, worked as the state's tourism director, and was considered "a strong voice for his native state".

== Biography ==
Born in Sheffield, Alabama, Greenhaw and his family moved to Tuscaloosa when he was ten. He attended Tuscaloosa High School, and at age fourteen contracted polio and spent the better part of a year in a body cast. During this time he read Ernest Hemingway and William Faulkner and decided to become a writer. He enrolled at the University of Alabama at Tuscaloosa and studied under the creative writing professor Hudson Strode. He wrote for The Montgomery Journal (which was later incorporated into the Montgomery Advertiser) and helped break the story of the indictment of William Calley for murder on September 12, 1969; Greenhaw was one of only a few people who spent time with Calley in that time, having him over at his house in Montgomery, Alabama. The story earned him a Nieman Fellowship at Harvard University in 1973.

He wrote for and edited the Alabama Magazine in the 1980s, and wrote for The New York Times and Time. From 1993 to 1994, he served as Alabama's state tourism director under Democratic Governor James Folsom Jr., and was awarded the Harper Lee Award for Alabama's Distinguished Writer in 2006. His papers are held in Auburn Montgomery's library.

Greenhaw died on May 31, 2011, in Birmingham from complications during heart surgery.

== Work ==
His book Fighting the Devil in Dixie: How Civil Rights Activists Took on the Ku Klux Klan in Alabama was hailed as "an important addition to the civil rights record"; the book is "a scholarly account based on interviews, court records, and newspaper articles" that has "readability and poignancy".

Greenhaw navigates through the explosive events that spurred a sea change in race relations, encompassing both the villains-e.g., Robert "Dynamite Bob" Chambliss, who supplied the explosives responsible for many of the bombings, including the Sixteenth Street Baptist Church in 1963-and the numerous heroes, such as the sole early black lawyers in Selma, J.L. Chestnut Jr., and Orzell Billingsley; attorney Charles Morgan in Birmingham; the intrepid Freedom Fighters, demonstrators and student writers for the Southern Courier; and Morris "Bubba" Dees Jr., who moved from representing racists to ardent civil-rights lawyer and co-founder of the Southern Poverty Law Center. The author skillfully weaves a rich historical tapestry from his deeply engaged, firsthand observations.

He co-wrote with Donnie Williams The Thunder of Angels: The Montgomery Bus Boycott and the People Who Broke the Back of Jim Crow. Williams and Greenhaw "expose the reader to lesser-known figures" of the Montgomery bus boycott, "bring[ing] to life the boycott that catapulted the nation into the civil rights era, portraying the personal sacrifices and heroism of ordinary people". Among his friends were a number of notables who were active in the civil rights movement, including Judge Frank M. Johnson, and notable Alabama professors and writers such as William Bradford Huie, Harper Lee, Don Noble, Rick Bragg, and Truman Capote.

In his book on George Wallace, George Wallace and the Defeat of the American Left, "Greenhaw portrays Wallace as a surprisingly intelligent man whose worst flaw is not racism (or even cynicism) but egocentricity".

== Select bibliography ==
- The Making of a Hero: A Behind-the-Scenes View of the Lt William Calley Affair (Louisville: Touchstone, 1971)
- Elephants in the cottonfields: Ronald Reagan and the new Republican South (New York City: Macmillan, 1982)
- Fighting the Devil in Dixie: How Civil Rights Activists Took on the Ku Klux Klan in Alabama (Chicago: Lawrence Hill Books, 2011)
