= Elisha Wolsey Peck =

American judge (1799–1888)

Elisha Wolsey Peck (1799–1888) was the chief justice of the Alabama Supreme Court from 1869 to 1873 and the president of the 1867 Alabama State Constitutional Convention. He owned slaves. He defended successfully a free "woman of color" who was enslaved.

== Background ==
Peck was born on August 7, 1799, in Blenheim, New York. David and Christiana Minturn Peck were his parents. He began to study law in 1819. In 1824 he was admitted to practice in Superior Court at Albany, New York. The following year he was admitted to the bar in Syracuse, New York.

He moved to Elyton, Alabama where he practiced law. A few years later moved to Tuscaloosa, Alabama.

Peck served from 1839 to 1841 as chancellor of the Middle Division Chancery Court. Peck was an opponent of secession but did not actively aid the cause of the Union during the Civil War.

He was a candidate for representative to the Alabama Constitutional Convention of 1865 but was defeated. In 1867, he moved to Sycamore, Illinois then to Rockford, Illinois and then back to Tuscaloosa, Alabama. He was elected chairman of the Military Reconstruction Convention of 1867. Later that year, Peck, a member of the Republican Party, was chosen as chief justice of the Alabama Supreme Court, where he served until retiring in 1874. He died at his home in Tuscaloosa, Alabama on February 13, 1888. He married Lucy Lamb Randall and had seven children. One of his children was poet Samuel Minturn Peck.

== Sources ==
- Delegates to the Constitutional Convention held at Montgomery, November 5-December 6, 1867
- Elisha Wolsey Peck papers, W.S. Hoole Special Collections Library, The University of Alabama.
