= Emma Camp (journalist) =

American journalist

Emma Camp is an American journalist and senior newsletter editor at the Wall Street Journal. She was an associate editor at Reason magazine and her pieces have previously appeared in The New York Times, The Atlantic, and Slate magazine. She has appeared as a guest on several news outlets including CNN's Smerconish, Making Money with Charles Payne and Rising on Hill TV.

== Early life and education ==
Emma Camp grew up in Homewood, Alabama. She went on to attend the Alabama School of Fine Arts in Birmingham. She attended the University of Virginia where she was selected as a Jefferson Scholar, one of the most prestigious undergraduate selections in the country. During her time at UVA she was a regular opinion columnist for The Cavalier Daily. While at UVA Camp featured in the film Common Grounds, an Emmy-nominated film focused on bringing students together to talk out their political differences. She graduated from the University of Virginia in 2022 with High distinction with degrees in philosophy and English literature.

== Career ==
Emma Camp has spent much of her career arguing for free speech, diversity of thought, and free enterprise.

=== University of Virginia ===
Camp garnered national attention with her New York Times opinion piece titled, “I Came to College Eager for Debate. I Found Self-Censorship Instead.” The piece argues that while she came to college to debate, she found herself self-censoring. Camp's piece was published around the time Mike Pence was invited by Young Americans for Freedom. Amid protests from left-wing groups on grounds, school president Jim Ryan and Dean of students Ian Baucom echoed Camp's position in their support for Pence's visit. In regards to Pence's visit, Camp argued that students have to learn ideological resilience and not learned helplessness. Critics have argued Camp's position makes room for intolerable ideas or those that students find harmful. Camp received further criticism from further left opponents that argued free-speech was not a protection from social consequence. The Foundation for Individual Rights in Education, which Emma interned for defended her position by arguing that crosstabs of their studies show a tendency for students to self-censor regardless of race or orientation. Polarization has been found to limit the ability for people to express themselves and have open discourse. Camp received the Exceptional Student Award from Heterodox Academy for her opinion piece and freelance writing for Reason magazine.

Camp has described herself as a liberal and has been described as a Good Biden Democrat by those who have written about her.

=== Wall Street Journal ===
Camp received significant notoriety for a series of videos she did on free enterprise and issues specifically affecting New York City, including rent control. She argued that rent control disincentivized the building of new housing and prevented landlords from making a proper profit on the current holdings, delaying repairs. She has gone on Fox Business and other platforms to discuss benefits of capitalism including grocery stores. Much of the viral short form content has been found on Twitter drawing praise and criticism for its quick-witted responses to left-wing policy and criticism.
