= Grey House Publishing =

- Founded: 1981
- Founder: Richard Gottlieb and Leslie Mackenzie
- Country of origin: United States
- Headquarters location: Amenia, New York
- Distribution: self-distributed (US and Canada); Eurospan Group (Europe)
- Publication types: books, directories, databases
- Official website: www.greyhouse.com

Grey House Publishing is an American publisher of directories and other reference books in business, health, education and other areas.

Its corporate headquarters are in Amenia, New York. It also has a Canadian office in Toronto.

In 2013, Grey House Publishing became the licensed publisher of the print editions of the Salem Press product line, in an agreement with EBSCO Publishing. Grey House Publishing publishes print editions of the H.W. Wilson product line.
