= William A. Raidy =

American journalist

William A. Raidy (c. 1923 – September 4, 1993, New York City) was an American journalist who was longtime theatre critic of both Broadway and Off-Broadway productions in New York.

== Life and career ==
Born in Manhattan, Raidy earned degrees from Georgetown University, New York University, and the Sorbonne. He also took theatre courses at the Yale School of Drama. He began his career in journalism in the mid 1940s as a features writer for the Long Island Press. In the mid 1960s he became the theatre critic for Newhouse News Service and The Star-Ledger, a position he remained in until his death three decades later. In 1966 he succeeded Ward Morehouse as the syndicated theatre columnist for the General Features corporation. He died in 1993 at New York University Medical Center at the age of 70.

In his book The Critics' Canon: Standards of Theatrical Reviewing in America, Richard H. Palmer uses critiques by Raidy to discuss ways in when theatre critics deliberate about the strengths and weaknesses of plot development, analyze dialogue, and review choreography.
