= NewSouth Books =

American publishing imprint

- Parent company: University of Georgia Press
- Founded: 2000
- Founder: H. Randall Williams and Suzanne LaRosa
- Country of origin: United States
- Headquarters location: Athens, Georgia
- Distribution: Longleaf Services
- Publication types: books
- Official website: www.ugapress.org/imprint/newsouth-books/

NewSouth Books is an academic publishing imprint of University of Georgia Press. The house was founded in Montgomery, Alabama, as an independent press in 2000 by editor H. Randall Williams and publisher Suzanne La Rosa. It was acquired by University of Georgia Press in 2022. Williams was the founder of Black Belt Press, working there from 1986 to 1999, and La Rosa worked in magazine and book publishing in New York City, before moving south. The publishing house is unrelated to NewSouth Books or NewSouth Publishing, imprints of UNSW Press based in Sydney, New South Wales, Australia.

NewSouth Books publishes nonfiction, fiction and poetry, as well as children's books. They have published works of fiction by Hans Koning and Gerald Duff; books of poetry by Andrew Glaze, John Beecher, Jorge Carrera Andrade, and Tom House; biographies of famous Alabamians like Sen. Howell Heflin, Gov. John Malcolm Patterson, and U.S. Supreme Court Chief Justice Hugo Black; and memoirs by Civil Rights figures Attorney Fred Gray and Rev. Robert Graetz.

The company received media attention in January 2011 for publishing an expurgated edition of Mark Twain's Adventures of Huckleberry Finn that censored the words "nigger" and "Injun." An argument to censor the edition was voiced by Alan Gribben, a professor at Auburn University at Montgomery, who said the version would be more friendly to teachers and students at schools which currently ban the book. NewSouth's version was met with criticism, with some saying the censorship failed to adequately convey the original connotations of Twain's text.
