= Helen Norris =

American poet

Helen Norris Bell (June 22, 1916 – November 18, 2013) was an American novelist and short story author who was Poet Laureate of Alabama from 1999 to 2003. Although most of Norris' work can be considered southern literature she also wrote many stories set in many places around the world, often preferring to write what she imagined to what she knew.

== Life ==
She began writing as a child and graduated from University of Alabama in 1938. Her first novel, Something More Than Earth, was published in 1940. The book, though launched with a party attended by Margaret Mitchell, was not a commercial success. Norris stopped writing after the birth of her children but began again in the 1950s with one novel unpublished until the 1980s and another, For the Glory of God, that was published in 1958. In 1966 she began teaching English at Huntington College in Montgomery, Alabama until her retirement in 1979.

Following her retirement, Norris actively pursued her writing career with several published books. Her short stories have appeared in Southern Review, Sewanee Review, Virginia Quarterly Review, and The Gettysburg Review, among other literary journals. Her honors include O. Henry Awards, a Pushcart Prize, and the PEN Women's Biennial Award for best novel.

Two of her stories have been made into television films. "The Christmas Wife" was filmed in 1988 starring Julie Harris and Jason Robards for HBO and was broadcast for several Christmas seasons. "The Cracker Man" was filmed for PBS stations in 1999.

In 2015 she was inducted into the inaugural class of the Alabama Writers' Hall of Fame.

== Books ==
Novels

- Something More Than Earth. Atlantic/Little, Brown, 1940.
- For the Glory of God. McMillan, 1958.
- More Than Seven Watchmen, Zondervan, 1985 (written in the 1950s).
- Walk With the Sickle Moon. Birch Lane Press, 1985.

Short story collections

- The Christmas Wife: Stories. University of Illinois Press, 1985
- Water Into Wine. University of Illinois Press, 1988.
- The Burning Glass: Stories. LSU Press, 1992.
- One Day in the Life of a Born Again Loser, and Other Stories. University of Alabama, 2000.

Poetry collections

- Whatever Is Round. Curbow Publications, 1994.
- Rain Pulse. Timberline Press, 1997.
