= Samuel Minturn Peck =

American poet (1854–1938)

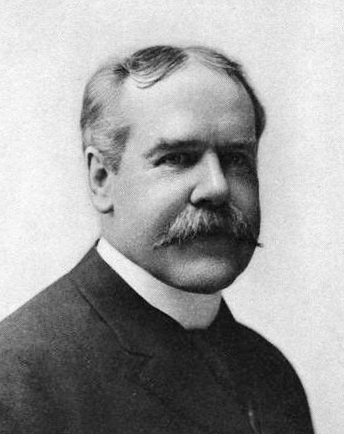
Samuel Minturn Peck, c. 1910

Samuel Minturn Peck (November 4, 1854 – May 3, 1938) was an American poet, named first poet laureate of the state of Alabama.

== Biography ==
Samuel Minturn Peck was born in Tuscaloosa, Alabama on November 4, 1854, the youngest of nine children of Elisha Wolsey Peck and Lucy Lamb Randall. In 1865, the family moved to Illinois before returning to Tuscaloosa two years later, where his father became a justice for the state Supreme Court. Peck earned a master's degree from the University of Alabama in 1871 and went on to get a medical degree in 1879 from Bellevue Hospital Medical College in order to please his parents, despite his literary ambitions.

It was while he was a medical student that, in 1878, he published his first poem, "The Orange Tree", in the New York Post. His first book, Cap and Bells, was published in 1886. His father died two years later and, with his inheritance, he traveled to Europe. He published several more books of verse, earning him a reputation as an unpretentious author of vers de société. In 1930, he was given the honorary position of Poet Laureate of Alabama, the first to hold the title, which he held until his death in 1938. The title was made specifically in his honor and was not again filled until 1954.

Peck died May 3, 1938.

== Poetic style and response ==
Between 1886 and 1925, he published seven volumes of poetry in addition to various poems published in newspapers like the Boston Transcript. Among his most famous poems is "The Grapevine Swing" (1892), which was frequently recited by schoolchildren. Upon the publication of his second book, one critic praised his "light verse, admirably written" and his "simple melodies" that were "rhythmically smooth".

As Peck himself noted, "In the making of my verses I have striven for simplicity, grace, and beauty. I have felt that sublimity was beyond my power to achieve." Peck showed an obvious dislike of less traditional poetic forms and privately noted his dislike for more Avant Garde poets including Amy Lowell, Ezra Pound, Harriet Monroe, and fellow Alabama writer Clement Wood, whom he satirized in his poem "The Poet and the Pixie". After the turn of the century, even Peck admitted he had become "somewhat passé".

Less often, Peck experimented with writing prose. In the 1890s, he attempted to replicate the success of local color stories by writers like Mary Noailles Murfree, Thomas Nelson Page, and Joel Chandler Harris, and published 25 such works in Alabama Sketches (1902). During interviews in his later years, he rarely referred to his attempts at prose and considered himself first and foremost a poet. At his death, however, he left behind four unfinished novels. A Birmingham, Alabama newspaper reported on his death by noting, "Peck was not a great poet. But he was a wholesome influence upon Alabama letters."

== Published works ==
- Cap and Bells (1886)
- Rings and Love-Knots (1892)
- Rhymes and Roses (1895)
- Fair Women of Today (1895)
- The Golf Girl (1899)
- Alabama Sketches (1902)
- Maybloom and Myrtle (1910)
- The Autumn Trail (1925)

== Bibliography ==
- Going, William T. (Summer 1954). "Samuel Minturn Peck, Late Laureate of Alabama: A Fin de Siécle Study". The Georgia Review. 8 (2): 190–200. JSTOR 41398024.
- Williams, Benjamin Buford (1979) A Literary History of Alabama: The Nineteenth Century. Farleigh Dickinson University Press, ISBN 083862054X
