= Religion in the United States =

Religious affiliation of adults in the United States, per Gallup (2020–2024)
1. Protestantism (44.8%)
2. Catholicism (21.8%)
3. Other Christians (2.40%)
4. Judaism (2.20%)
5. Other non-Christian (2.00%)
6. No religion (21.4%)
7. Other responses/no answer (5.60%)

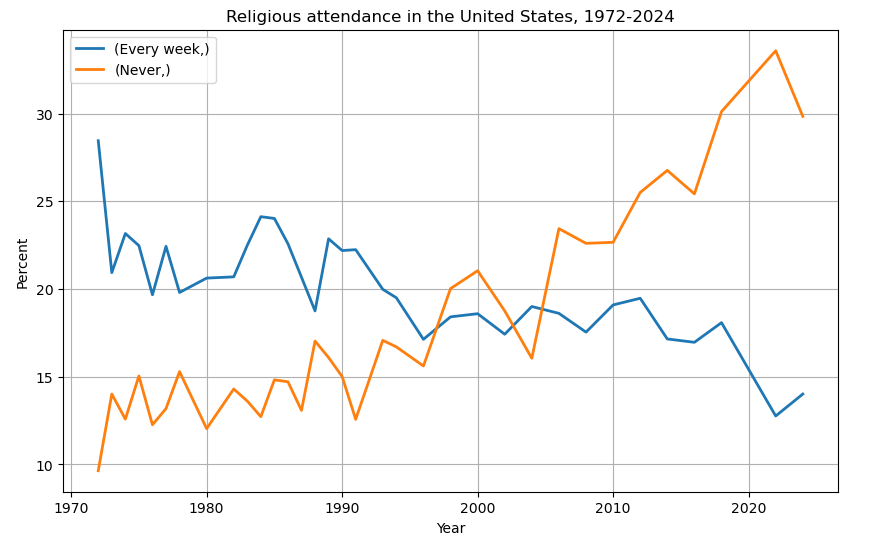
Religious attendance in the United States, 1972–2024

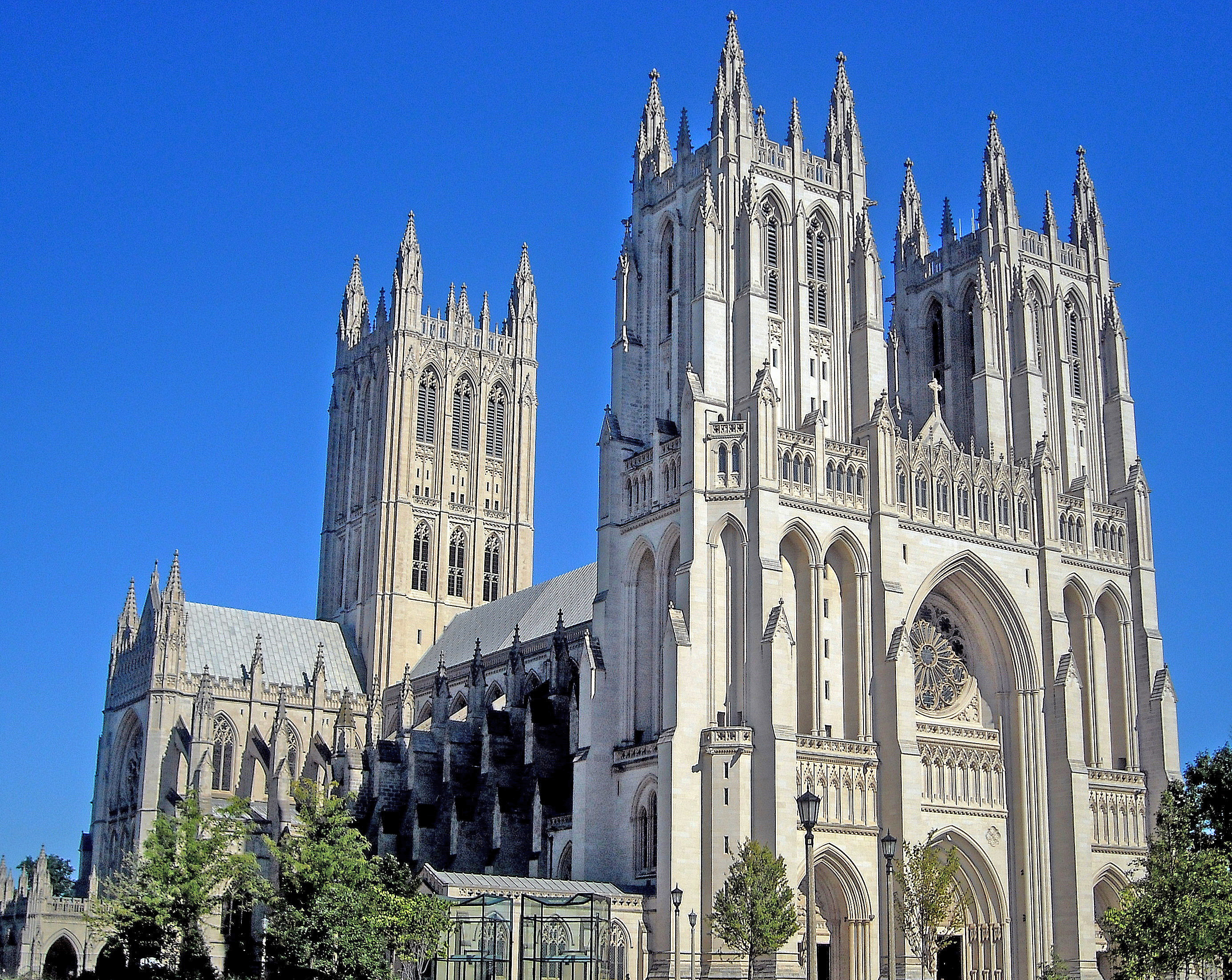
The Washington National Cathedral.

Religion in the United States is both widespread and diverse, with higher reported levels of belief than other wealthy Western nations. Polls indicate that an overwhelming majority of Americans believe in a higher power (2021), engage in spiritual practices (2022), and consider themselves religious or spiritual (2017).

Christianity is the most widely professed religion, with the majority of Americans being evangelicals, mainline Protestants, or Catholics, although its dominance has declined in recent decades, and as of 2012 Protestants no longer formed a majority in the US. The United States has the largest Christian and Protestant population in the world. Judaism is the second-largest religion in the US, practiced by 2% of the population, followed by Hinduism, Buddhism, and Islam, each with 1% of the population. States vary in religiosity from Mississippi, where 63% of adults self-describe as very religious, to New Hampshire where 20% do. The elected legislators of Congress overwhelmingly identify as religious and Christian; with few exceptions, both the Republican and Democratic parties nominate those who are.

Among the historical and social characteristics of the United States that some scholars of religion credit for the country's high level of religiousness include its Constitutional guarantees of freedom of religion and legal tradition of separation of church and state; the early immigration of religious dissenters from Northwestern Europe (Anglicans, Quakers, Mennonites, and other mainline Protestants); the religious revivalism of the first (1730s and 1740s), and second (1790s and 1840s) Great Awakenings, which led to an enormous growth in Christian congregations—from 10% of Americans being members before the Awakenings, to 80% belonging after.

The aftermath led to what historian Martin Marty calls the "Evangelical Empire", a period in which evangelicals dominated US cultural institutions. They influenced measures to abolish slavery, further women's rights, enact prohibition, and reform education and criminal justice. New denominations were formed (Adventism, Jehovah's Witnesses, the Latter Day Saint movement (Mormonism), Churches of Christ and Church of Christ, Scientist, Unitarian and Universalist, Pentecostalism). Outside of Protestantism, an unprecedented number of Catholic and Jewish immigrants arrived in the United States during the immigrant waves of the mid to late 19th and 20th century.

Social scientists have noted that beginning in the early 1990s, the percentage of Americans professing no religious affiliation began to rise from 6% in 1991 to 29% in 2021—with younger people having higher rates of unaffiliation. Similarly, polling indicated a decline in church attendance, and the number of people agreeing with the statement that religion is "very important" in their lives. Explanations for this trend include lack of trust in numerous institutions, backlash against the religious right in the 1980s, sexual abuse scandals in established religions, the end of the Cold War (and its connection of religiosity with patriotism), and the September 11 attacks (by religious Jihadists). Many of the "Nones" (those without a religious affiliation) have belief in a god or higher power and spiritual forces beyond the natural world. As of 2024, Christianity's decline may have leveled off or slowed, according to the Pew Research Center and Gallup, though according to the Public Religion Research Institute it has continued to decline.

== History ==
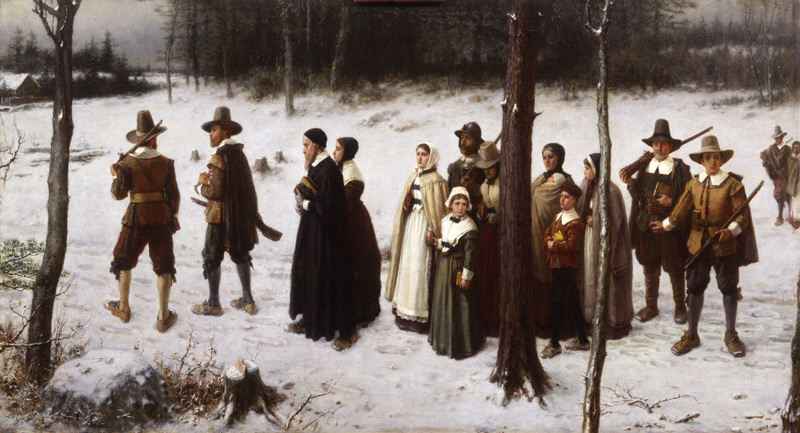
Pilgrims Going to Church by George Henry Boughton (1867)

Ever since its early colonial days, when some Protestant dissenter English and German settlers moved in search of religious freedom, America has been profoundly influenced by religion. Throughout its history, religious involvement among American citizens has grown since 1776 from 17% of the US population to 62% in 2000. Approximately 35-40 percent of Americans regularly attended religious services from eighteenth-century colonial America up to 1940. That influence continues in American culture, social life, and politics. Several of the original Thirteen Colonies were established by settlers who wished to practice their own religion within a community of like-minded people: the Massachusetts Bay Colony was established by English Puritans (Congregationalists), Pennsylvania by British Quakers, Maryland by English Catholics, and Virginia by English Anglicans. Despite these, and as a result of intervening religious strife and preference in England the Plantation Act 1740 would set official policy for new immigrants coming to British America until the American Revolution. While most settlers and colonists during this time were Protestant, a few early Catholic and Jewish settlers also arrived from Northwestern Europe into the colonies; however, their numbers were very slight compared to the Protestant majority. Even in the "Catholic Proprietary" or colony of Maryland, the vast majority of Maryland colonists were Protestant by 1670.

The text of the First Amendment in the US Constitution states that "Congress shall make no law respecting an establishment of religion, or prohibiting the free exercise thereof; or abridging the freedom of speech, or of the press; or the right of the people peaceably to assemble, and to petition the Government for a redress of grievances." It guarantees the free exercise of religion while also preventing the government from establishing a state religion. However, the states were not bound by the provision, and as late as the 1830s Massachusetts provided tax money to local Congregational churches. Since the 1940s, the Supreme Court has interpreted the Fourteenth Amendment as applying the First Amendment to state and local governments.

President John Adams and a unanimous Senate endorsed the Treaty of Tripoli in 1797 that stated: "the Government of the United States of America is not, in any sense, founded on the Christian religion."

Expert researchers and authors have referred to the United States as a "Protestant nation" or "founded on Protestant principles", specifically emphasizing its Calvinist heritage.

The modern official motto of the United States of America, as established in a 1956 law signed by President Dwight D. Eisenhower, is "In God We Trust". The phrase first appeared on US coins in 1864.

According to a 2002 survey by the Pew Research Center, nearly 6 in 10 Americans said that religion plays an important role in their lives, compared to 33% in Great Britain, 27% in Italy, 21% in Germany, 12% in Japan, and 11% in France. The survey report stated that the results showed America having a greater similarity to developing nations (where higher percentages say that religion plays an important role) than to other wealthy nations, where religion plays a minor role.

In 1963, 90% of US adults claimed to be Christians while only 2% professed no religious identity. In 2016, 73.7% identified as Christians while 18.2% claimed no religious affiliation. In 2019, a Pew Research Center survey report concluded that "the religiously unaffiliated share of the population, consisting of people who describe their religious identity as atheist, agnostic or 'nothing in particular,' now stands at 26%, up from 17% in 2009" and that "both Protestantism and Catholicism are experiencing losses of population share." Many of the unaffiliated retain religious beliefs or practices without affiliating. There have been variant proposed explanations for secularization including lack of trust in the labor market, with government, in marriage and in other aspects of life, backlash against the religious right in the 1980s, sexual abuse scandals, particularly those within the Southern Baptist Convention and Catholic Church.

Other signs of a decline in religiosity include a decline in the percentage of respondents who say religion is "very important" in their lives compared to those who say it is not (the answer "very important" falling from 70% in 1965 to 45% in 2023, and "not very important" rising from 7 to 28% over the same period in Gallup polls), and a decline in church attendance (those who report attending church monthly or more often having declined from 52% to 45% from 2007 to 2018, according to a Pew Research Center survey). Still other sources insist Americans are becoming more religious, and surveys showing otherwise suffer from methodological deficiencies.

A 2022 study by Pew Research Center estimated that the religiously unaffiliated had reached 30% of the population by 2020. It predicted that in the "most plausible" scenario, accounting for observed acceleration of religious switching, this would increase to 42% by 2050.

== Freedom of religion ==
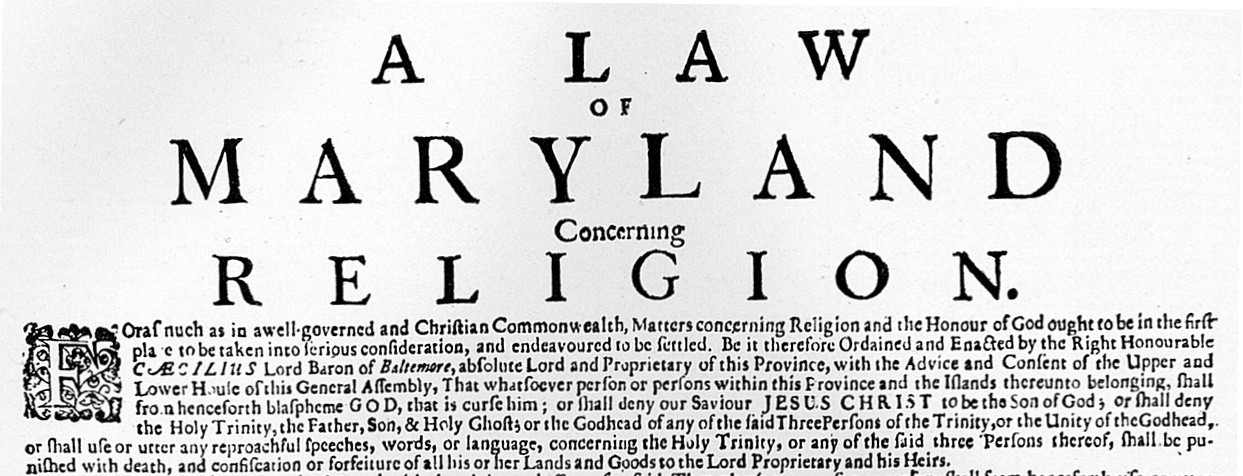
The Maryland Toleration Act secured religious liberty in the English colony of Maryland. Similar laws were passed in the Rhode Island and Providence Plantations, Connecticut and Pennsylvania. These laws stood in direct contrast with the Puritan theocratic rule in the Plymouth and Massachusetts Bay colonies.

According to the American legal scholar and academic Noah Feldman, the United States federal government was the first government to be designed with no established religion at all. However, some states had established religions within their borders until the 1830s.

Modeling the provisions concerning religion within the Virginia Statute for Religious Freedom, the framers of the Constitution rejected any religious test for office, and the First Amendment specifically denied the federal government any power to enact any law respecting either an establishment of religion or prohibiting its free exercise, thus protecting any religious organization, institution, or denomination from government interference. The decision was mainly influenced by European Rationalist and Protestant ideals, but was also a consequence of the pragmatic concerns of minority religious groups and small states that did not want to be under the power or influence of a national religion that did not represent them.

== Christianity ==
The most popular religion in the United States is Christianity, comprising the majority of the population (73.7% of adults in 2016), with the majority of American Christians belonging to a Protestant denomination or a Protestant offshoot (such as the Latter Day Saint movement or the Jehovah's Witnesses). According to the Association of Statisticians of American Religious Bodies newsletter published March 2017, based on data from 2010, Christians were the largest religious population in all 3,143 counties in the country. Roughly 48.9% of Americans are Protestants, 23.0% are Catholics, 1.8% are Mormons (members of the Church of Jesus Christ of Latter-day Saints). Christianity was introduced during the period of European colonization. The United States has the world's largest Christian population.

According to membership statistics from current reports and official web sites, the five largest Christian denominations are:

- The Catholic Church in the United States, 71,000,000 members
- The Southern Baptist Convention, 13,680,493 members
- The National Baptist Convention, USA, Inc., 8,415,100 members
- The Church of Jesus Christ of Latter-day Saints, 6,920,086 members
- The United Methodist Church, 5,714,815 members

The Southern Baptist Convention, with over 13 million adherents, is the largest of more than 200 distinctly named Protestant denominations. In 2007, members of evangelical churches comprised 26% of the American population, while another 18% belonged to mainline Protestant churches, and 7% belonged to historically black churches.

A 2015 study estimates some 450,000 Christian believers from a Muslim background in the country, most of them belonging to some form of Protestantism.

=== Protestant denominations ===
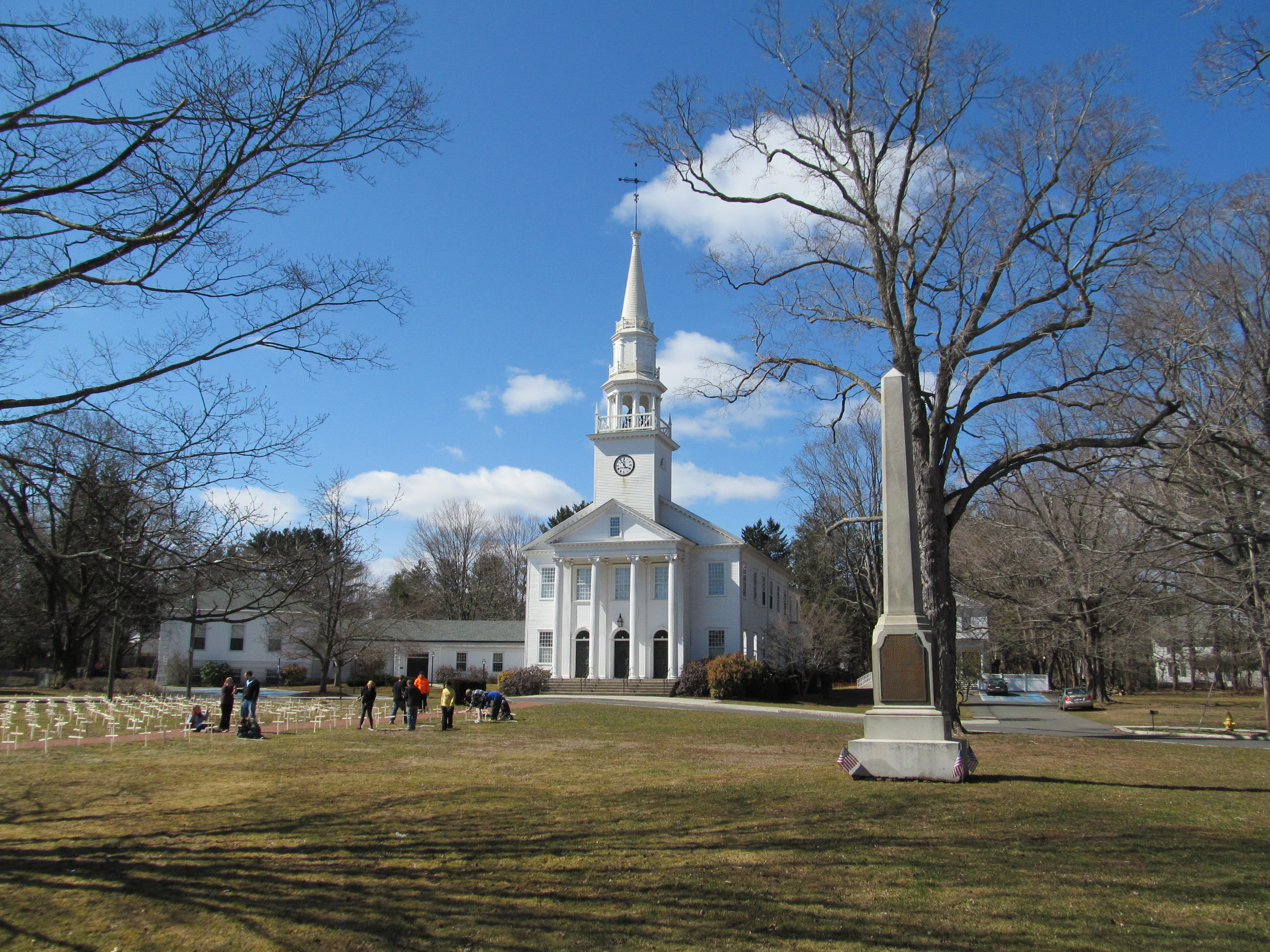
A Congregational church in Cheshire, Connecticut

Beginning around 1600, Northwestern European settlers introduced the Anglican and Puritan religion, as well as Baptist, Presbyterian, Lutheran, Quaker, and Moravian denominations. Historians agree that members of mainline Protestant denominations have played leadership roles in many aspects of American life, including politics, business, science, the arts, and education. They founded most of the country's leading institutes of higher education. According to Harriet Zuckerman, 72% of American Nobel Prize laureates between 1901 and 1972, have identified from Protestant background.

Traditionally Episcopalians and Presbyterians tended to be wealthier and better educated than most other religious groups, and numbers of the most wealthy and affluent American families as the Vanderbilts and Astors, Rockefeller, Du Pont, Roosevelt, Forbes, Fords, Whitneys, Morgans and Harrimans were Mainline Protestant families, although 2015/2016 (Pew) studies found households affiliated with Judaism and Hinduism to be more likely to have incomes over $100,000 per year than those in the mainline tradition Protestants, with other American religious groups having lower median incomes.

Some of the first colleges and universities in America, including Harvard, Yale, Princeton, Columbia, Dartmouth, Pennsylvania, Duke, Boston, Williams, Bowdoin, Middlebury, and Amherst, all were founded by mainline Protestant denominations. By the 1920s most had weakened or dropped their formal connection with a denomination. James Hunter argues:

The private schools and colleges established by the mainline Protestant denominations, as a rule, still want to be known as places that foster values, but few will go so far as to identify those values as Christian.... Overall, the distinctiveness of mainline Protestant identity has largely dissolved since the 1960s.

=== Great Awakenings and other Protestant descendants ===
Several Christian groups were founded in America during the Great Awakenings. Interdenominational evangelicalism and Pentecostalism emerged; new Protestant denominations such as Adventism; non-denominational movements such as the Restoration Movement (which over time separated into the Churches of Christ, the Christian churches and churches of Christ, and the Christian Church (Disciples of Christ)); Jehovah's Witnesses (called "Bible Students" in the latter part of the 19th century); and the Church of Jesus Christ of Latter-day Saints (Mormonism).

=== Catholicism ===
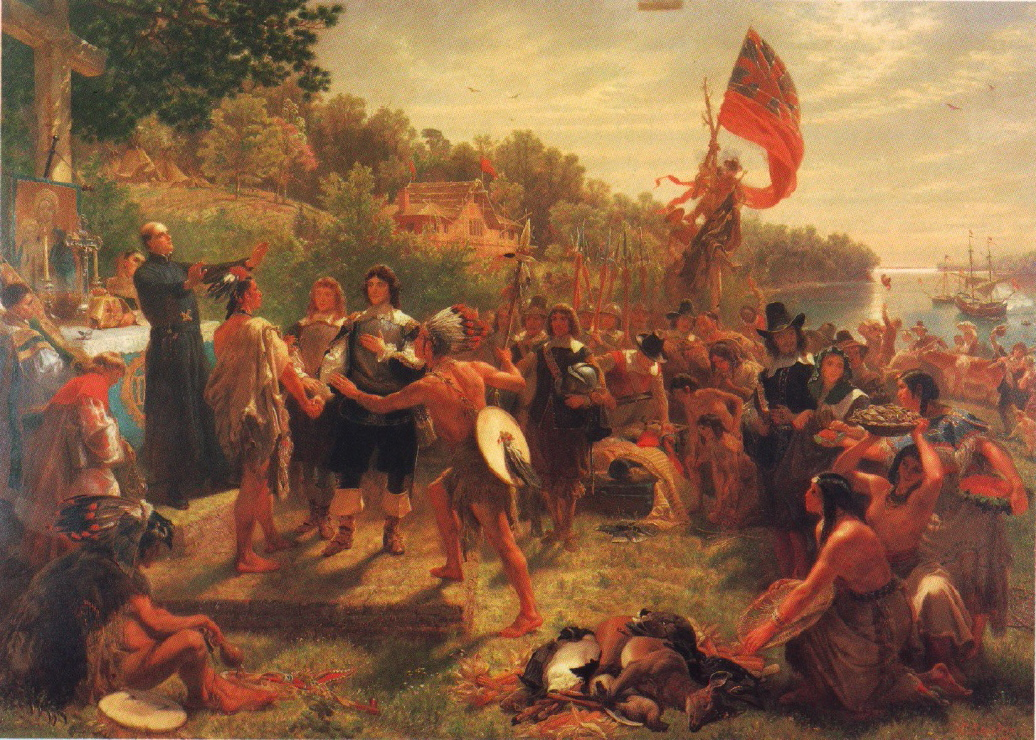
The Founding of Maryland (1634) depicts Father Andrew White, a Jesuit missionary in the left and colonists meeting the people of the Yaocomico branch of the Piscatawy Indian Nation in St. Mary's City, Maryland, the site of Maryland's first colonial settlement.

Catholicism first came to the territories now forming the United States by way of Spanish colonists in the present-day Virgin Islands (1493), Puerto Rico (1508), Florida (1513), South Carolina (1566), Georgia (1568–1684), and the southwest. The first known Catholic Mass held in what would become the United States was in 1526 by Dominican friars Antonio de Montesinos and Anthony de Cervantes, who ministered to the San Miguel de Gualdape colonists for the 3 months the colony existed. The influence of the Alta California missions (1769 and onwards) forms a lasting memorial to part of this heritage. Until the 19th century, the Franciscans and other religious orders had to operate their missions under the Spanish and Portuguese governments and military.

While the Puritans were securing their Commonwealth, members of the Catholic Church in England were also planning a refuge, "for they too were being persecuted on account of their religion." Among those interested in providing a refuge for Catholics was the second Lord of Baltimore, George Calvert, who established Maryland, a "Catholic Proprietary", in 1634, more than sixty years after the founding of the Spanish Florida mission of St. Augustine. The first US Catholic university, Georgetown University, was founded in 1789. Though small in number in the beginning, Catholicism grew over the centuries to become the largest single denomination in the United States, primarily through immigration, but also through the acquisition of continental territories under the jurisdiction of French and Spanish Catholic powers. Though the European Catholic and indigenous population of these former territories were small, the material cultures there, the original mission foundations with their canonical Catholic names, are still recognized today (as they were formerly known) in any number of cities in California, New Mexico and Louisiana. (The most recognizable cities of California, for example, are named after Catholic saints.)

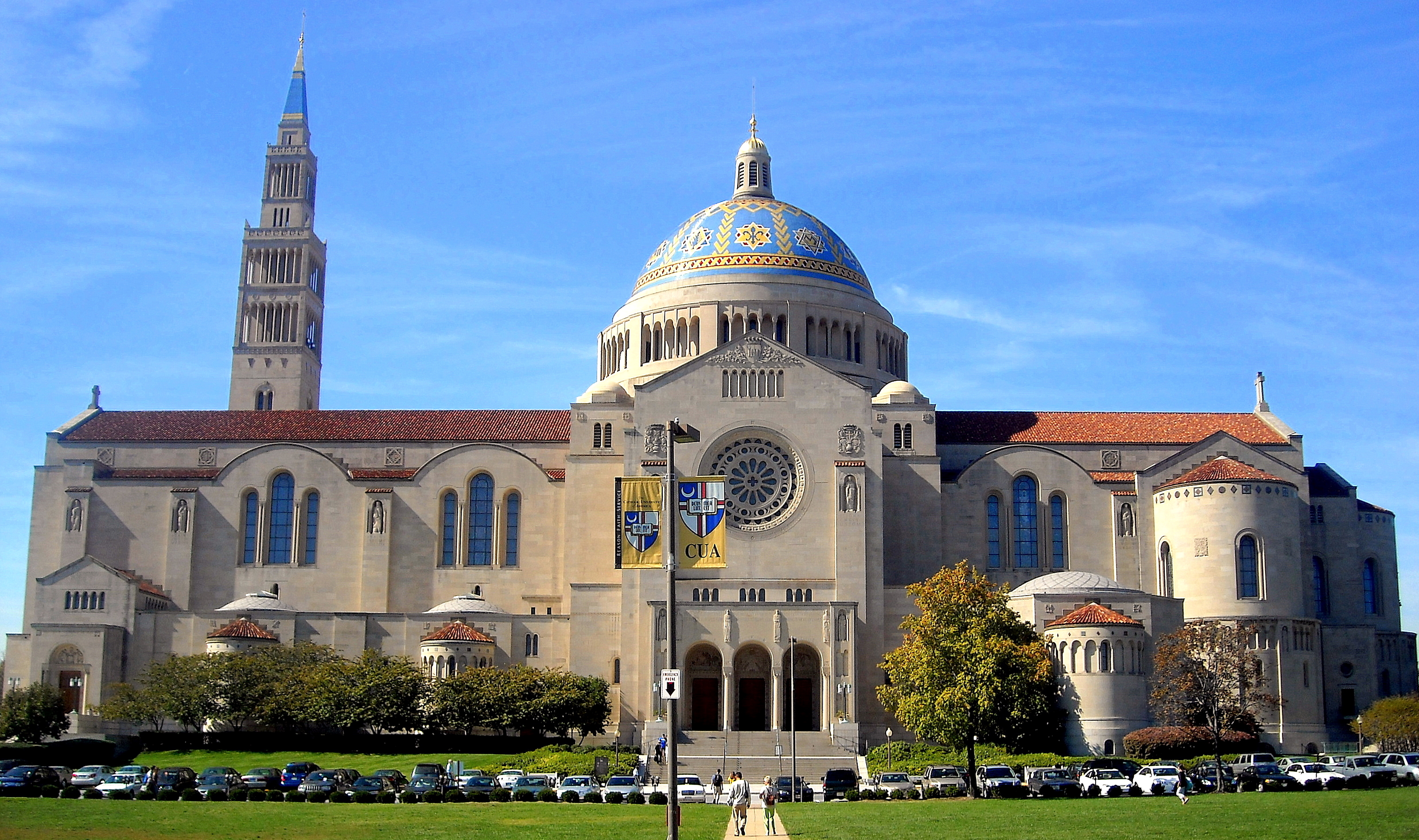
The Basilica of the National Shrine of the Immaculate Conception in Washington, D.C., is the largest Catholic church in the United States.

While Catholic Americans were present in small numbers early in United States history, both in Maryland and in the former French and Spanish colonies that were eventually absorbed into the United States, the vast majority of Catholics in the United States today derive from unprecedented waves of immigration from primarily Catholic countries and regions (Ireland was still part of the United Kingdom until 1921 and German unification didn't officially occur until 1871) during the mid-to-late 19th and 20th century. Irish, Hispanic, Italian, Portuguese, French Canadian, Polish, German, Lebanese (Maronite), and Syrian (Syriac Catholic) immigrants largely contributed to the growth in the number of Catholics in the United States. Irish and German Catholics, by far, provided the greatest number of Catholic immigrants before 1900. From 1815 until the close of the Civil War in 1865, 1,683,791 Irish Catholics immigrated to the US. The German states followed, providing "the second largest immigration of Catholics, clergy and lay, some 606,791 in the period 1815-1865, and another 680,000 between 1865 and 1900, while the Irish immigration in the latter period amounted to only 520,000." Of the four major national groups of clergy (early and mid-19th century)—Irish, German, Anglo-American, and French—"the French emigre priests may be said to have been the outstanding men, intellectually." As the number of Catholics increased in the late 19th and 20th century, they built up a vast system of schools (from primary schools to universities) and hospitals. Since then, the Catholic Church has founded hundreds of other colleges and universities, along with thousands of primary and secondary schools. Schools like the University of Notre Dame is ranked best in its state (Indiana), as Georgetown University is ranked best in the District of Columbia. The following 10 Catholic universities are also ranked among the top 100 universities in the US: University of Notre Dame, Georgetown University, Boston College, Santa Clara University, Villanova University, Marquette University, Fordham University, Gonzaga University, Loyola Marymount University, and the University of San Diego. Leo XIV has been pope since 2025 and is the first pope from the United States.

=== Eastern Orthodoxy and Oriental Orthodoxy ===
Eastern Orthodoxy was present in North America since the Russian colonization of Alaska; however, Alaska would not become a United States territory until 1867, and most Eastern Orthodox Russian settlers in Alaska returned to Russia after the American acquisition of the Alaskan territory. The native converts and a few priests remained behind.

Most Eastern Orthodoxes arrived in the contiguous United States as immigrants beginning in the late 19th century and throughout the 20th century. Two major groups brought Eastern Orthodoxy to America, one were Eastern Europeans like Russians, Greeks, Ukrainians, Serbians and others. The second major group were from Levant like Lebanese, Syrians, Palestinians and others.

Armenians, Indians, Copts and Assyrians, also brought Oriental Orthodoxy to America.

=== Demographics of various Christian groups ===
The strength of various sects varies greatly in different regions of the country, with rural parts of the South having many evangelicals but very few Catholics (except Louisiana and the Gulf Coast, and from among the Hispanic community, both of which consist mainly of Catholics), while urbanized areas of the north Atlantic states and Great Lakes, as well as many industrial and mining towns, are heavily Catholic, though still quite mixed, especially due to the heavily Protestant African-American communities. In 1990, nearly 72% of the population of Utah was Mormon, as well as 26% of neighboring Idaho. Lutheranism is most prominent in the Upper Midwest, with North Dakota having the highest percentage of Lutherans (35% according to a 2001 survey).

The largest religion, Christianity, has proportionately diminished since 1990. While the absolute number of Christians rose from 1990 to 2008, the percentage of Christians dropped from 86% to 76%. A nationwide telephone interview of 1,002 adults conducted by The Barna Group found that 70% of American adults believe that God is "the all-powerful, all-knowing creator of the universe who still rules it today", and that 9% of all American adults and 0.5% young adults hold to what the survey defined as a "biblical worldview".

Episcopalian, Presbyterian, Eastern Orthodox and United Church of Christ members have the highest number of graduate and post-graduate degrees per capita of all Christian denominations in the United States, as well as the most high-income earners. However, owing to the sheer size or demographic head count of Catholics, more individual Catholics have graduate degrees and are in the highest income brackets than have or are individuals of any other religious community.

== Religious minorities ==
=== Judaism ===
After Christianity, Judaism is the next largest religious affiliation in the United States, though this identification is not necessarily indicative of religious beliefs or practices. The Jewish population in the United States was approximately 6 million in 2010. A significant number of people identify themselves as American Jews on ethnic and cultural grounds rather than religious observance. For example, 19% of self-identified American Jews do not believe God exists. The 2001 ARIS study projected from its sample that there are about 5.3 million adults in the American Jewish population: 2.83 million adults (1.4% of the US adult population) are estimated to be adherents of Judaism; 1.08 million are estimated to be adherents of no religion; and 1.36 million are estimated to be adherents of a religion other than Judaism. ARIS 2008 estimated about 2.68 million adults (1.2%) in the country identify Judaism as their faith. According to a 2017 study, Judaism is the religion of approximately 2% of the American population. According to a 2020 study by the Pew Research Center, the core American Jewish population is estimated at 7.5 million people, this includes 5.8 million Jewish adults. According to a study by the Steinhardt Social Research Institute, as of 2020, the core American Jewish population is estimated at 7.6 million people; this includes 4.9 million adults who identify their religion as Jewish, 1.2 million Jewish adults who identify with no religion, and 1.6 million Jewish children.

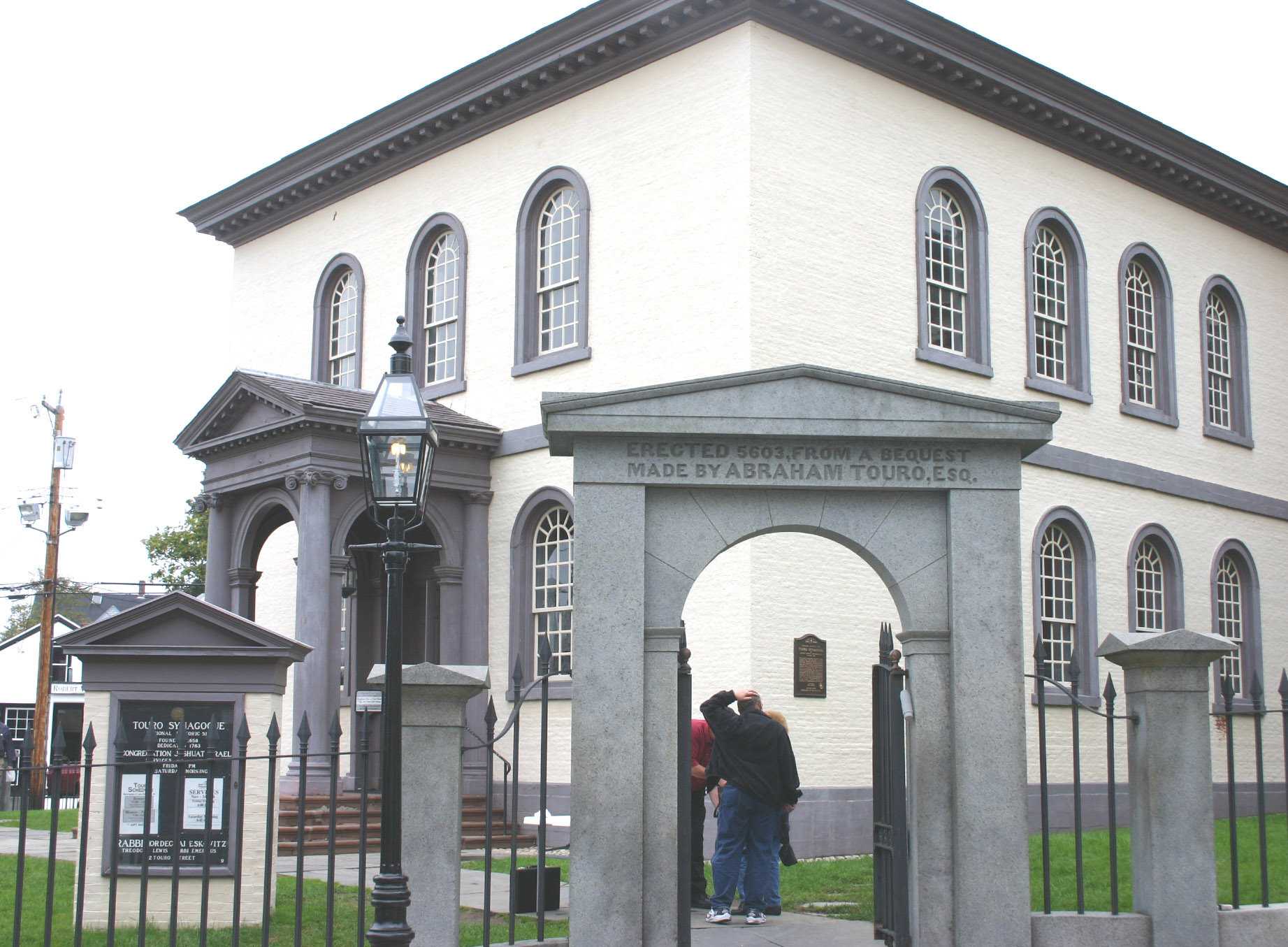
Touro Synagogue, (built 1759) in Newport, Rhode Island, has the oldest still existing synagogue building in the United States.

Jews have been present in what is now the United States since the 17th century and allowed explicitly since the British colonial Plantation Act 1740. Although small Western European communities initially developed and grew, large-scale immigration did not occur until the late 19th century, mainly due to persecution in parts of Eastern Europe. The Jewish community in the United States is composed predominantly of Ashkenazi Jews whose ancestors emigrated from Central and Eastern Europe. There are, however, small numbers of older (and some recently arrived) communities of Sephardi Jews with roots tracing back to 15th-century Iberia (Spain, Portugal, and North Africa). There are also Mizrahi Jews (from the Middle East, Caucasia and Central Asia), as well as much smaller numbers of Ethiopian Jews, Indian Jews, and others from various smaller Jewish ethnic divisions. Approximately 25% of the Jewish American population lives in New York City.

According to the Association of Statisticians of American Religious Bodies newsletter published in March 2017, based on data from 2010, Jews were the largest minority religion in 231 counties out of the 3143 counties in the country. According to a 2014 survey conducted by the Pew Forum on Religion and Public Life, 1.7% of adults in the U.S. identified Judaism as their religion. Among those surveyed, 44% said they were Reform Jews, 22% said they were Conservative Jews, and 14% said they were Orthodox Jews. According to the 1990 National Jewish Population Survey, 38% of Jews were affiliated with the Reform tradition, 35% were Conservative, 6% were Orthodox, 1% were Reconstructionists, 10% linked themselves to some other tradition, and 10% said they are "just Jewish".

Thus, the majority of American Jews affiliated themselves with the major Jewish movements: Conservative, Orthodox and Reform Judaism. Already in the 1980s, 20–30% of members of the largest Jewish communities, such as of New York City, Chicago, and Miami, rejected a denominational label.

According to the 2001 National Jewish Population Survey, 4.3 million American Jewish adults have some sort of strong connection to the Jewish community, whether religious or cultural. Jewishness is generally considered an ethnic identity as well as a religious one. Among the 4.3 million American Jews described as "strongly connected" to Judaism, over 80% have some sort of active engagement with Judaism, ranging from attendance at daily prayer services on one end of the spectrum to attending Passover Seders or lighting Hanukkah candles on the other. The survey also discovered that Jews in the Northeast and Midwest are generally more observant than Jews in the South or West.

The Jewish American community has higher household incomes than average and is one of the best-educated religious communities in the United States.

=== Islam ===
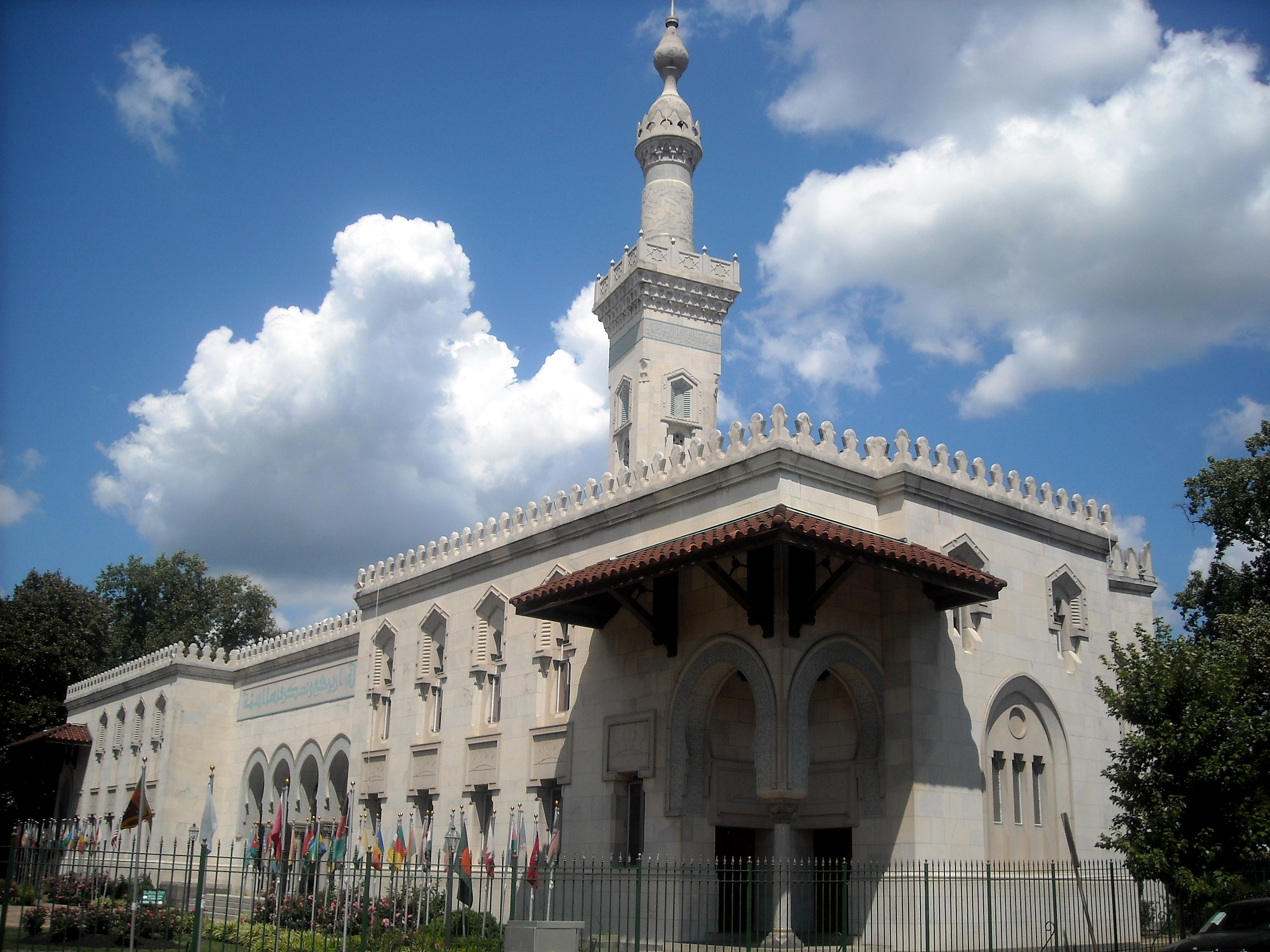
The Islamic Center of Washington in the nation's capital is a leading American Islamic Center.

Pew Research Center estimates that there are about 5.5 million Muslims of all ages living in the United States in 2026, making up roughly 1.6% of the total U.S. population. According to the Institute for Social Policy and Understanding (ISPU) in 2018, approximately 3.45 million Muslims are living in the United States, including 2.05 million adults. Compared to other faith groups surveyed (Jewish, Catholic, Protestant, Non-Affiliated), ISPU found in 2017 that Muslims were most likely to be born outside of the US (50%), with 36% having undergone naturalization, and the most racially diverse group (Black or African American 25%; White 24%; Arab 18%; Asian/Chinese/Japanese 18%; Mixed 7%; Hispanic 5%; Native American/American Indian/Alaska Native 1%; Other 2%). In addition to diversity, Americans Muslims are most likely to report being low income, and among those who identify as middle class, the majority are Muslim women, not men. Although American Muslim education levels are similar to other religious communities, namely Christians, within the Muslim American population, Muslim women surpass Muslim men in education, with 31% of Muslim women having graduated from a four-year university. 90% of Muslim Americans identify as straight.

Islam in America effectively began with the arrival of African slaves. It is estimated that about 10% of African slaves transported to the United States were Muslim. Most, however, became Christians, and the United States did not have a significant Muslim population until the arrival of immigrants from Arab and East Asian Muslim areas. According to some experts, Islam later gained a higher profile through the Nation of Islam, a religious group that appealed to black Americans after the 1940s; its prominent converts included Malcolm X and Muhammad Ali. The first Muslim elected to Congress was Keith Ellison in 2006, followed by André Carson in 2008.

Out of all religious groups surveyed by ISPU, Muslims were found to be the most likely to report experiences of religious discrimination (61%). That can also be broken down when looking at gender (with Muslim women more likely than Muslim men to experience racial discrimination), age (with young people more likely to report experiencing racial discrimination than older people), and race (with Arab Muslims the most likely to report experiencing religious discrimination). Muslims born in the United States are more likely to experience all three forms of discrimination: gender, religious, and racial.

Research indicates that Muslims in the United States are generally more assimilated and prosperous than their counterparts in Europe. Like other subcultural and religious communities, the Islamic community has generated its own political organizations and charity organizations.

=== Buddhism ===
Services at the Hompa Hongwanji Buddhist Temple, Los Angeles, around 1925

Buddhism entered the United States during the 19th century with the arrival of the first immigrants from East Asia. The first Buddhist temple was established in San Francisco in 1853 by Chinese Americans. The first prominent US citizen to publicly convert to Buddhism was Colonel Henry Steel Olcott in 1880, who is still honored in Sri Lanka for his Buddhist revival efforts. An event that contributed to the strengthening of Buddhism in the United States was the Parliament of the World's Religions in 1893, which was attended by many Buddhist delegates sent from India, China, Japan, Vietnam, Thailand and Sri Lanka.

In the late 19th century, Buddhist missionaries from Japan traveled to the US, and during the same time period, US intellectuals started to take an interest in Buddhism.

The early 20th century was characterized by continuing tendencies rooted in the 19th century. The second half, by contrast, saw the emergence of new approaches and the move of Buddhism into the mainstream, making itself a mass and social-religious phenomenon.

According to a 2016 study, Buddhists are approximately 1% of the American population. According to the Association of Statisticians of American Religious Bodies newsletter published in March 2017, based on data from 2010, Buddhists were the largest minority religion in 186 counties out of the 3143 counties in the country.

=== Hinduism ===
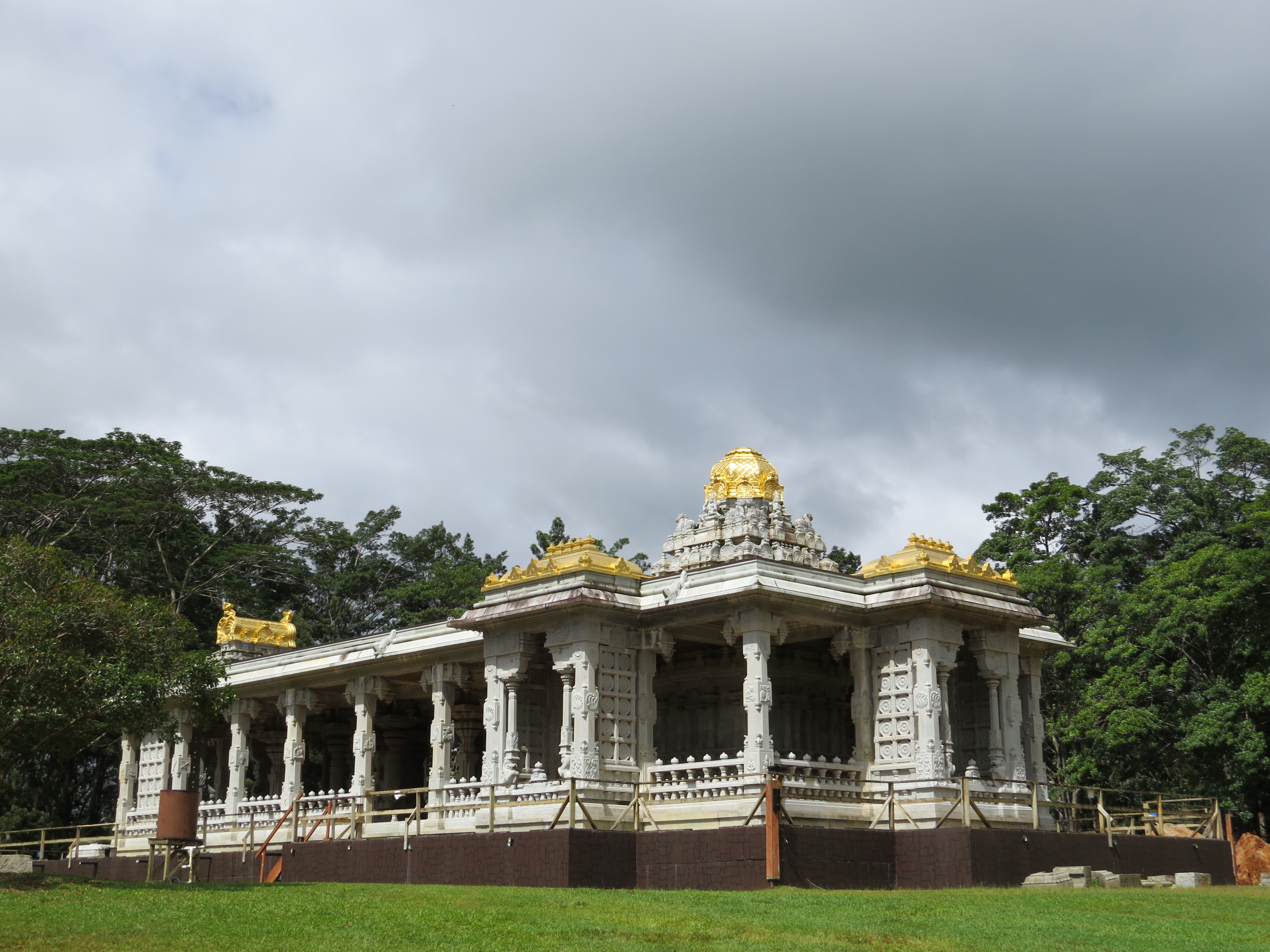
Saiva Siddhanta Temple on Kauaʻi Island in Hawaii is the only Hindu monastery in the United States

Hinduism represents approximately 1% of the U.S. population in 2010s. In 2001, there were an estimated 766,000 Hindus in the US, about 0.2% of the total population.

The first time Hinduism entered the United States is not clearly identifiable. However, large groups of Hindus have immigrated from India, Sri Lanka, Nepal, Pakistan, Bangladesh, Guyana, Trinidad and Tobago, other parts of the Caribbean, southern Africa, eastern Africa, Singapore, Malaysia, Indonesia, Mauritius, Fiji, Europe, Australia, New Zealand, and other regions and countries since the enactment of the Immigration and Nationality Act of 1965. During the 1960s and 1970s, Hinduism exercised fascination and contributed to the development of New Age thought. During the same decades, the International Society for Krishna Consciousness (ISKCON), a Vaishnavite Hindu reform organization, was founded in the US by A. C. Bhaktivedanta Swami Prabhupada. In 2003, the Hindu American Foundation—a national institution protecting the rights of the Hindu community of the US—was founded.

According to the Association of Statisticians of American Religious Bodies newsletter published in March 2017, based on data from 2010, Hindus were the largest minority religion in 92 counties out of the 3143 counties in the country.

American Hindus have one of the highest rates of educational attainment and household income among all religious communities and tend to have lower divorce rates. Hindus also have higher acceptance towards homosexuality (71%), which is higher than the general public (62%).

=== Sikhism ===
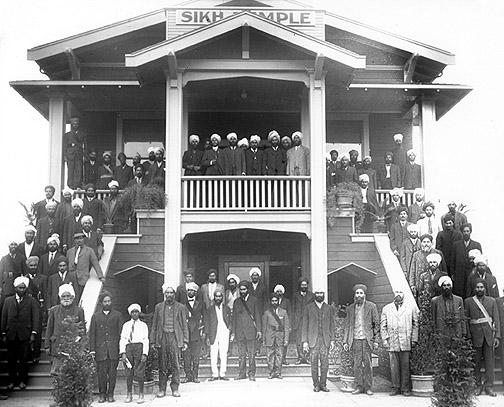
Front of the Stockton Sikh Temple, circa 1915. This wooden structure was replaced with a new building in 1929.

Sikhism is a religion originating from the Indian subcontinent which was introduced into the United States when, around the turn of the 20th century, Sikhs started emigrating to the United States in significant numbers to work on farms in California. They were the first community to come from India to the US in large numbers. The first Sikh Gurdwara in America was built in Stockton, California, in 1912. In 2007, there were estimated to be between 250,000 and 500,000 Sikhs living in the United States, with the largest populations living on the East and West Coasts, with additional populations in Detroit, Chicago, and Austin.

The United States also has a number of non-Punjabi converts to Sikhism.

=== Bahá'í Faith ===
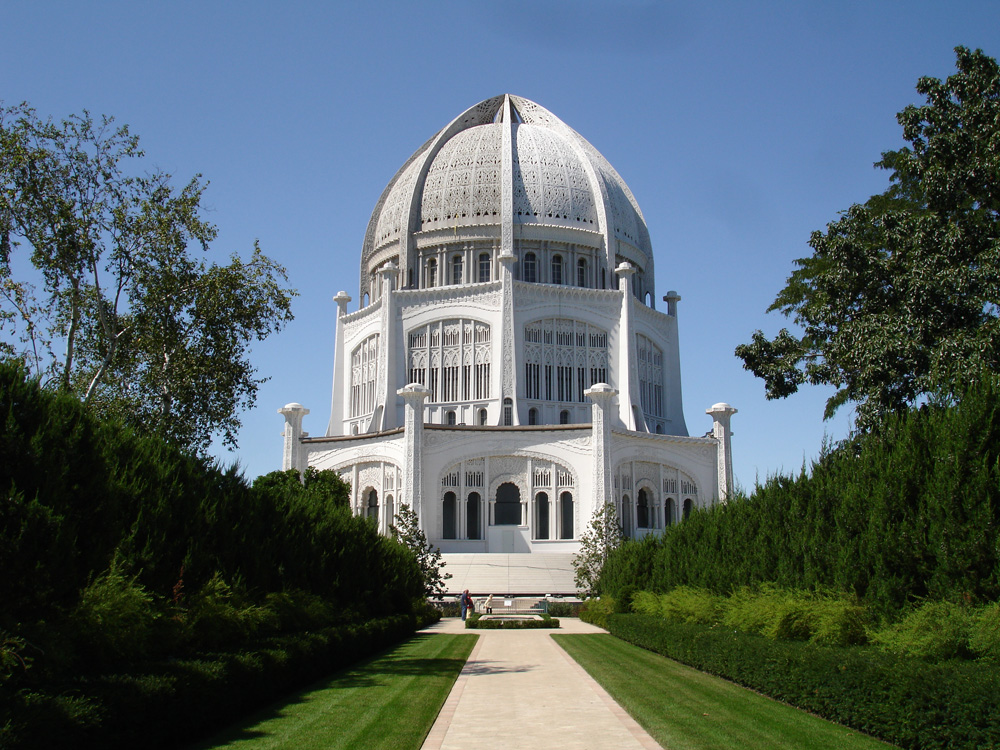
Bahá'í House of Worship (built 1953) in Wilmette, Illinois, is the oldest extant Bahá'í house of worship in the world and the only one in the United States.

The Baháʼí Faith was first mentioned in the United States in 1893 at the World Parliament of Religions in Chicago. Soon after, early American converts began embracing the new religion. Thornton Chase was the first American Baháʼí, dating from 1894. One of the first Baháʼí institutions in the US was established in Chicago to facilitate the establishment of the first Baháʼí House of Worship in the West, which was eventually built in Wilmette, Illinois and dedicated in 1953.

Worldwide, the religion has grown faster than the rate of population growth over the 20th century, and has been recognized since the 1980s as the most widespread minority religion in the countries of the world. Similarly, by 2020, the religion was the largest minority religion in about half of the counties. Since about 1970 the state with the single largest Baháʼí population was South Carolina. From 2010 data the largest populations of Baháʼís at the county-by-county level are in Los Angeles, CA, Palm Beach, FL, Harris County, TX, and Cook County, IL. However, estimates of the total number of Baháʼís varies widely from around 175,000 to 500,000.

=== Jainism ===
Adherents of Jainism first arrived in the United States in the 20th century. The most significant time of Jain immigration was in the early 1970s. The United States has since become a center of the Jain Diaspora. The Federation of Jain Associations in North America is an umbrella organization of local American and Canadian Jain congregations to preserve, practice, and promote Jainism and the Jain way of life.

=== Druze Faith ===
Druze began migrating to the United States in the late 1800s from the Levant (Syria and Lebanon). Druze emigration to the Americas increased at the outset of the 20th century due to the famine during World War I that killed an estimated one third to one half of the population, the 1860 Mount Lebanon civil war, and the Lebanese Civil War between 1975 and 1990. The United States is the second-largest home of Druze communities outside the Middle East after Venezuela (60,000). According to some estimates there are about 30,000 to 50,000 Druzes in the United States, with the largest concentration in Southern California. American Druze are mostly of Lebanese and Syrian descent.

Members of the Druze faith face the difficulty of finding a Druze partner and practicing endogamy; marriage outside the Druze faith is strongly discouraged according to the Druze doctrine. They also face the pressure of keeping the religion alive because many Druze immigrants to the United States converted to Protestantism, becoming communicants of the Presbyterian or Methodist churches.

=== Taoism ===
Taoism was popularized throughout the world by the writings and teachings of Laozi and other Taoists, as well as the practice of qigong, tai chi, and other Chinese martial arts. The first Taoists in the United States were immigrants from China during the mid-nineteenth century. They settled mainly in California, where they built the first Taoist temples in the country, including the Tin How Temple in San Francisco's Chinatown and the Joss House in Weaverville. Currently, the Temple of Original Simplicity is outside Boston, Massachusetts.

In 2004, there were an estimated 56,000 Taoists in the United States.

=== Rastafari ===
Rastafarians began migrating to the United States in the 1950s, '60s and '70s from the religion's 1930s birthplace, Jamaica.

Marcus Garvey, who is considered a prophet by many Rastafarians, rose to prominence and cultivated many of his ideas in the United States.

=== Native American religions ===
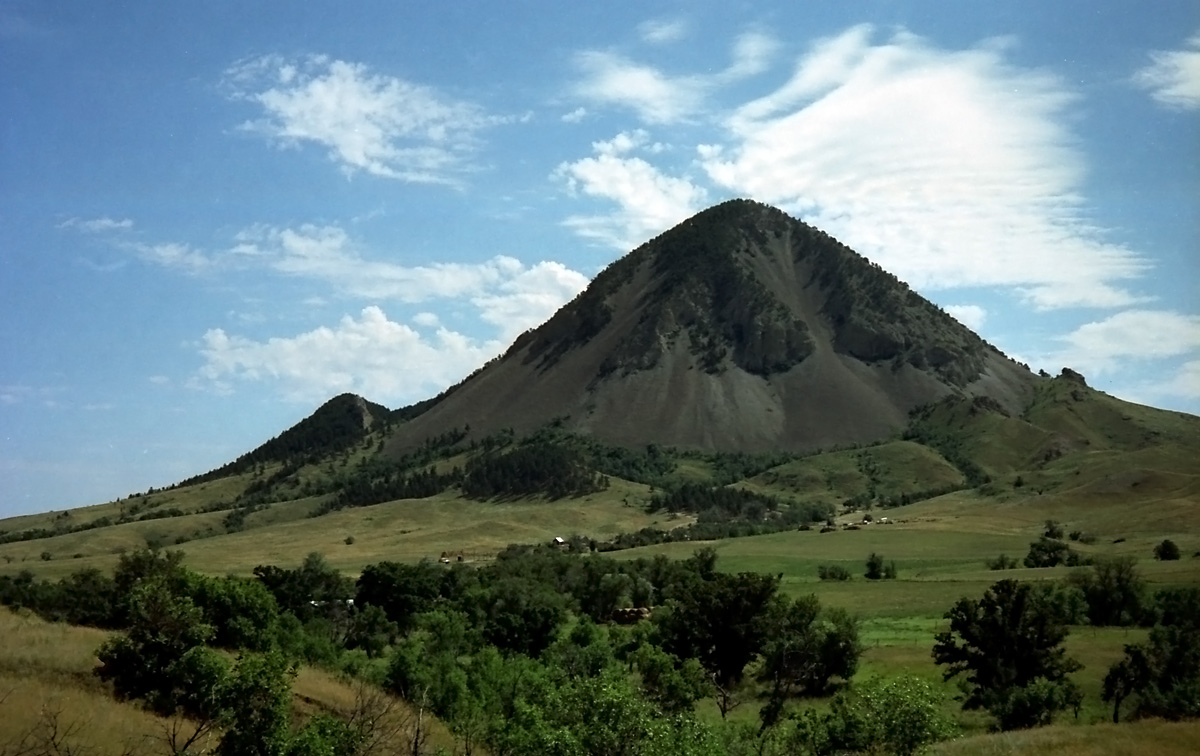
Bear Butte, in South Dakota, is a sacred site for over 30 Plains tribes.

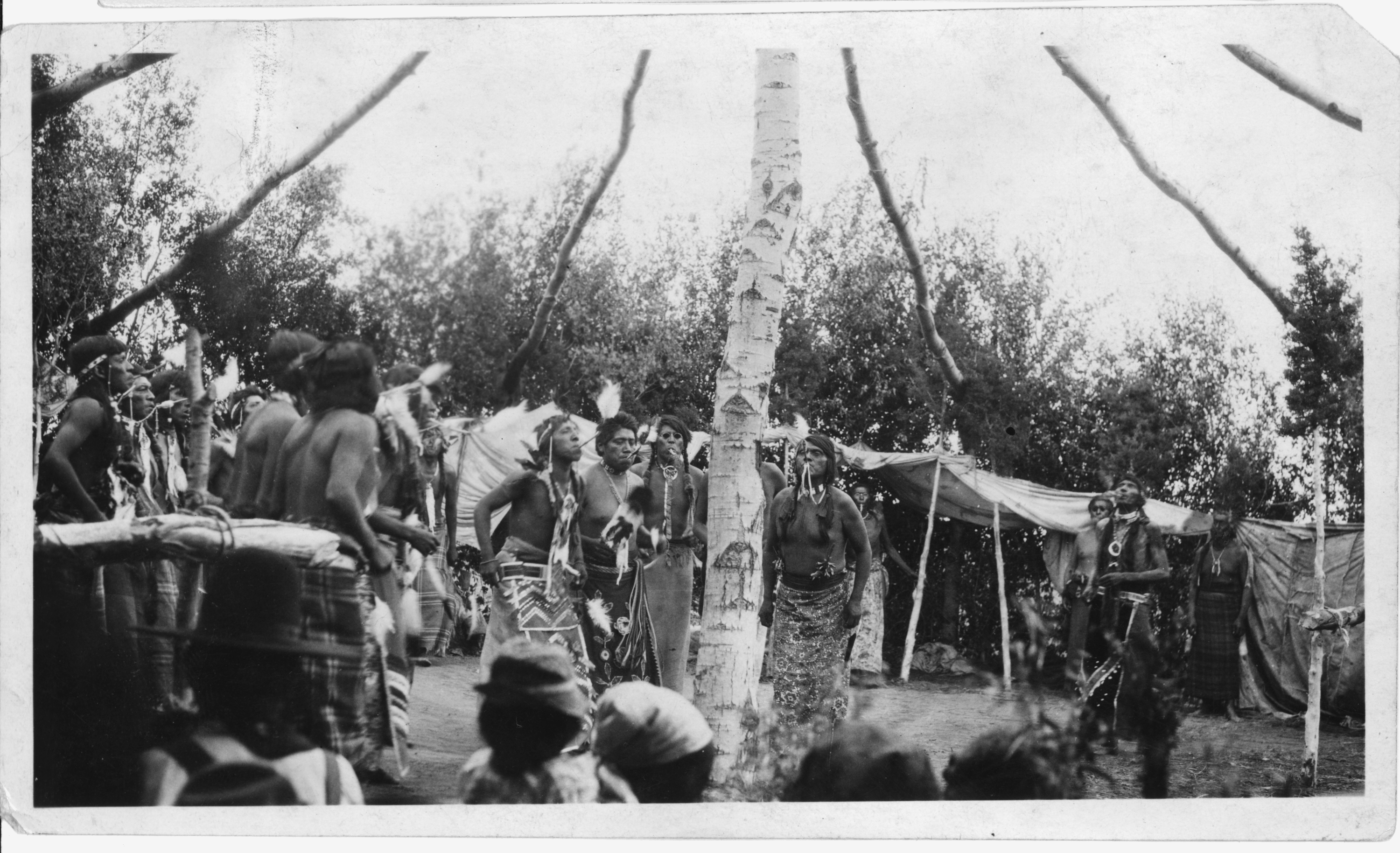
Shoshone Sun Dance at Fort Hall, 1925.

Native American ethnic and indigenous faiths historically exhibited much diversity, and are often characterized by animism or panentheism and shamanism. Common concept is the supernatural world of deities, spirits and wonders, such as the Algonquian manitou or the Lakota's wakan. In most areas, without Christian influence, was known a supreme Great Spirit or sky deity. Their great creation myths and sacred oral tradition in whole, as anthropologists note, are comparable to the Christian Bible.

The membership of Native American religions in the 21st century comprises about 9,000 people. Since Native Americans practicing traditional ceremonies do not usually have public organizations or membership rolls, these "members" estimates are likely substantially lower than the actual numbers of people who participate in traditional ceremonies.

The following is a list of Indigenous American religions those still survive to some degree at the beginning of the 21st century: Alaska Native religions, Abenaki, Anishinaabe (Ojibwe, Midewiwin society), Apache, Blackfoot, Californian (Kuksu religion, Miwok, Ohlone and Pomo), Choctaw, Crow, Haida, Ho-Chunk, Iroquoian (Cherokee, Mohawk, Muscogee Creek, Onondaga, Seneca, Wendat religion and Wyandot), Jivaroan, Kwakwakaʼwakw, Lenape, Mapuche, Navajo, Nuu-chah-nulth, Pawnee, Pueblo (Acoma Pueblo, Hopi and Zuni), Sioux (Assiniboine, Dakota and Lakota), Tsimshian, Ute, and Yaqui beliefs.

There are also numerous indigenist revitalization movements within them that are divided into fundamentalist and reform.

Generally fundamentalist movements include the Pueblo Revolt (1680s), the Shawnee Prophet movement (1805–1811), the Cherokee Prophet movement (1811–1813), the Red Stick War (1813–1814), White Path's Rebellion (1826), the Winnebago Prophet movement (1830–1832), the first Ghost Dance (1869–1870) and the second Ghost Dance (1889–1890), and the Snake movements among the Cherokee, Choctaw, and Muscogee Creek peoples during the 1890s.

Generally syncretic reform movements include the Yaqui religion (1500–present), the Longhouse religion (1797–present), the Munsee Prophetess movement (1804–1805), the Kickapoo Prophet movement (1815–present), the Cherokee Keetoowah Society (1858–present), the Washat Dreamers religion (1850–present), the Indian Shakers (1881–present), the Native American Church (1800s–present), the Shoshoni Sun Dance (1890–present), the New Tidings religion or Wocekiye of the Canadian Sioux (1900–present), and Ojibwe Drummer movement (contemporary).

Thus, the Longhouse Religion combines and reinterprets elements of traditional Iroquois beliefs with a revised code such as must refrain from drinking, selling off land, intensive animal farming, and witchcraft, meant to revive traditional consciousness after a long period of cultural disintegration following colonization. It was founded in 1797 by the Seneca prophet Handsome Lake (Sganyodaiyoˀ). The movement had about 5,000 practicing members as of 1969.

Since 1889, in accordance with the millenarian teachings of the Northern Paiute spiritual leader Wovoka, the Ghost Dance ceremony was incorporated into numerous native belief systems.

The Sun Dance is a prominent living ceremony and movement, the Shoshone by origin in 1890, practiced by a number of peoples, primarily those of the Plains Nations. Many of the ceremonies have features in common, such as specific dances and songs, the use of drums, the ceremonial pipe, praying, fasting, and, in some cases, the piercing of the skin as a sacrifice. At most ceremonies, other participants stay in the surrounding camp and pray to support the dancers.

The Native American Church is a 19th-century origin syncretistic religious tradition involving the ceremonial and sacred use of Lophophora williamsii (peyote).

=== Neopaganism ===
Neopaganism in the United States is represented by widely different movements and organizations. The largest Neopagan religion is Wicca, followed by Neo-Druidism. Other neopagan movements include Germanic Neopaganism, Celtic Reconstructionist Paganism, Hellenic Polytheistic Reconstructionism, and Semitic neopaganism.

==== Wicca ====
Wicca advanced in North America in the 1960s by Raymond Buckland, an expatriate Briton who visited Gardner's Isle of Man coven to gain initiation. Universal Eclectic Wicca was popularized in 1969 for a diverse membership drawing from both Dianic and British Traditional Wiccan backgrounds.

==== Druidry ====
According to the American Religious Identification Survey (ARIS), there are approximately 30,000 druids in the United States. Modern Druidism arrived in North America first in the form of fraternal Druidic organizations in the nineteenth century, and orders such as the Ancient Order of Druids in America were founded as distinct American groups as early as 1912. In 1963, the Reformed Druids of North America (RDNA) was established by students at Carleton College, Northfield, Minnesota. They adopted elements of Neopaganism into their practices, for instance, celebrating the festivals of the Wheel of the Year.

=== New Thought Movement ===
A group of churches that started in the 1830s in the United States is known under the banner of "New Thought." These churches share a spiritual, metaphysical and mystical predisposition and understanding of the Bible and were strongly influenced by the Transcendentalist movement, particularly the work of Ralph Waldo Emerson. Another antecedent of this movement was Swedenborgianism, founded on the writings of Emanuel Swedenborg in 1787. The New Thought concept was named by Emma Curtis Hopkins ("teacher of teachers") after Hopkins broke off from Mary Baker Eddy's Church of Christ, Scientist. The movement had been previously known as the Mental Sciences or the Christian Sciences. The three major branches are Religious Science, Unity Church, and Divine Science.

=== Unitarian Universalism ===
Unitarian Universalists (UUs) are among the most liberal of all religious denominations in America. The shared creed includes beliefs in inherent dignity, a common search for truth, respect for beliefs of others, compassion, and social action. They are unified by their shared search for spiritual growth and by the understanding that an individual's theology is a result of that search and not obedience to an authoritarian requirement. UUs have historical ties to anti-war, civil rights, and LGBTQ rights movements, as well as providing inclusive church services for the broad spectrum of liberal Christians, liberal Jews, secular humanists, LGBTQ people, Jewish-Christian parents and partners, Earth-centered/Wicca, and Buddhist meditation adherents. In fact, many UUs also identify as belonging to another religious group, including atheism and agnosticism.

== No religion ==
In 2024, approximately 21.4% of Americans declared themselves to be not religiously affiliated.

=== Agnosticism, atheism, and humanism ===
A 2001 survey directed by Dr. Ariela Keysar for the City University of New York indicated that, amongst the more than 100 categories of response, "no religious identification" had the greatest increase in population in both absolute and percentage terms. This category included atheists, agnostics, humanists, and others with no stated religious preferences. Figures are up from 14.3 million in 1990 to 34.2 million in 2008, representing an increase from 8% of the total population in 1990 to 15% in 2008. A nationwide Pew Research study published in 2008 put the figure of unaffiliated persons at 16.1%, while another Pew study published in 2012 was described as placing the proportion at about 20% overall and roughly 33% for the 18–29-year-old demographic. It is unknown why the number of self-identified "nones" is rising, although it may relate to a general decline of trust in institutions, the September 11 attacks, rise of the religious right, and sexual abuse scandals, particularly those within the Southern Baptist Convention and Catholic Church. The majority of "nones" have religion-like beliefs and believe in some conception of a higher power.

In a 2006 nationwide poll, University of Minnesota researchers found that despite an increasing acceptance of religious diversity, atheists were generally distrusted by other Americans, who trusted them less than Muslims, recent immigrants and other minority groups in "sharing their vision of American society". They also associated atheists with undesirable attributes such as amorality, criminal behavior, rampant materialism and cultural elitism. However, the same study also reported that "The researchers also found acceptance or rejection of atheists is related not only to personal religiosity, but also to one's exposure to diversity, education and political orientation – with more educated, East and West Coast Americans more accepting of atheists than their Midwestern counterparts." Some surveys have indicated that doubts about the existence of the divine were growing quickly among Americans under 30.

On March 24, 2012, American atheists sponsored the Reason Rally in Washington, D.C., followed by the American Atheist Convention in Bethesda, Maryland. Organizers called the estimated crowd of 8,000–10,000 the largest-ever US gathering of atheists in one place.

Secular people in the United States, such as atheist and agnostics, have a distinctive secular tradition that can be traced for at least hundreds of years. They sometimes create religion-like institutions and communities, create rituals, and debate aspects of their shared beliefs.

==== Belief in the existence of a god ====
Various polls have been conducted to determine Americans' actual beliefs regarding a god. (Different wording of the poll question gives significantly different results.):

- A 2021 Pew Research Center Survey found that 91% of American believe in a higher power.
- A 2018 Pew Research Center Survey found that 90% of American believe in a higher power.
- In 2014 the Pew Research Center's Religious Landscape Study showed 63% of Americans believed in God and were "absolutely certain" in their view, while the figure rose to 89% including those who were agnostic.
- A 2012 WIN-Gallup International poll showed that 5% of Americans considered themselves "convinced" atheists, which was a fivefold increase from the last time the survey was taken in 2005, and 5% said they did not know or else did not respond.
- A 2012 Pew Research Center survey found that doubts about the existence of a god had grown among younger Americans, with 68% telling Pew they never doubt God's existence, a 15-point drop in five years. In 2007, 83% of American millennials said they never doubted God's existence.
- A 2011 Gallup poll found 92% of Americans said yes to the basic question "Do you believe in God?", while 7% said no and 1% had no opinion.
- A 2010 Gallup poll found 80% of Americans believe in a god, 12% believe in a universal spirit, 6% don't believe in either, 1% chose "other", and 1% had no opinion. 80% is a decrease from the 1940s, when Gallup first asked this question.
- A late 2009 online Harris poll of 2,303 US adults (18 and older) found that "82% of adult Americans believe in God", the same number as in two earlier polls in 2005 and 2007. Another 9% said they did not believe in God, and 9% said that they were not sure. It further concluded, "Large majorities also believe in miracles (76%), heaven (75%), that Jesus is God or the Son of God (73%), in angels (72%), the survival of the soul after death (71%), and in the resurrection of Jesus (70%). Less than half (45%) of adults believe in Darwin's theory of evolution but this is more than the 40% who believe in creationism..... Many people consider themselves Christians without necessarily believing in some of the key beliefs of Christianity. However, this is not true of born-again Christians. In addition to their religious beliefs, large minorities of adults, including many Christians, have "pagan" or pre-Christian beliefs such as a belief in ghosts, astrology, witches and reincarnation.... Because the sample is based on those who agreed to participate in the Harris Interactive panel, no estimates of theoretical sampling error can be calculated."
- A 2008 survey of 1,000 people concluded that, based on their stated beliefs rather than their religious identification, 69.5% of Americans believe in a personal God, roughly 12.3% of Americans are atheist or agnostic, and another 12.1% are deistic (believing in a higher power/non-personal God, but no personal God).
- Mark Chaves, a Duke University professor of sociology, religion and divinity, found that 92% of Americans believed in God in 2008, but that significantly fewer Americans have great confidence in their religious leaders than a generation ago.
- According to a 2008 ARIS survey, belief in God varies considerably by region. The lowest rate is in the West with 59% reporting a belief in God, and the highest rate is in the South at 86%.

=== Spiritual but not religious ===
"Spiritual but not religious" (SBNR) is self-identified stance of spirituality that takes issue with organized religion as the sole or most valuable means of furthering spiritual growth. Spirituality places an emphasis upon the wellbeing of the "mind-body-spirit", so holistic activities such as tai chi, reiki, and yoga are common within the SBNR movement. In contrast to religion, spirituality has often been associated with the interior life of the individual.

One fifth of the US public and a third of adults under the age of 30 are reportedly unaffiliated with any religion, however they identify as being spiritual in some way. Of these religiously unaffiliated Americans, 37% classify themselves as spiritual but not religious.

According to some sociologists, perceptions of religious decline are a popular misconception. They state that surveys showing so suffer from methodological deficiencies, that Americans are becoming more religious, and that Atheists and Agnostics make up a small and stable percentage of the population. "Religious belief and interest" has remained relatively stable in recent years; "organizational participation", in contrast, has decreased.

== Major US-origin movements ==
=== Christian ===
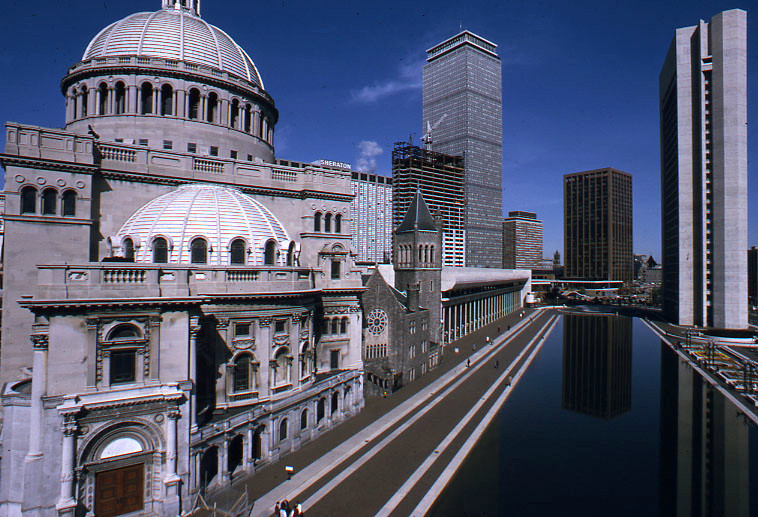
The First Church of Christ, Scientist in Boston, Massachusetts

- Adventism — began as an inter-denominational movement during the Second Great Awakening (1790–1840). Its most vocal leader was William Miller, who in the 1830s in New York became convinced of an imminent Second Coming of Jesus. The most prominent modern group to emerge from this is the Seventh-day Adventists.
- Charismatic movement — a broad movement within mainstream Christian denominations to adopt beliefs and practices of Charismatic Christianity and similar to Pentecostalism, with an emphasis on baptism with the Holy Spirit, and the use of spiritual gifts (charismata). Since 1960, it has affected most denominations in the US, and has spread widely across the world.
- Christian Science — a faith healing movement associated with the Church of Christ, Scientist that founded in 1879 in New England by Mary Baker Eddy.
- Holiness movement — a movement that emerged chiefly within 19th-century American Methodism with the belief that the Christian life should be free of sin.
- Jehovah's Witnesses — originated with the nontrinitarian movement known as Bible Students, which was founded in Pennsylvania in the late 1870s by Charles Taze Russell. In their early years, the Bible Students were loosely connected with Adventism, and the Jehovah's Witnesses still share some similarities with it.
- Latter Day Saint movement, a.k.a. Mormonism, founded in 1830 by Joseph Smith in upstate New York — a product of the Christian revivalist movement of the Second Great Awakening and based in Christian primitivism. Multiple Latter Day Saint denominations can be found throughout the United States. The Church of Jesus Christ of Latter-day Saints (LDS Church), the largest denomination, is headquartered in Salt Lake City, Utah, while The Community of Christ (also known as the Reorganised Church of Jesus Christ of Latter Day Saints), the second-largest denomination, is headquartered in Independence, Missouri.
- Messianic Judaism — a movement of the Jews and non-Jews, which arose in the 1960s within Evangelical Protestantism and absorbed elements of the Jewish Christian traditions.
- Pentecostalism — a large movement which emphasizes the role of the baptism with the Holy Spirit and the use of spiritual gifts, finds its historic roots in the Azusa Street Revival in Los Angeles from 1904 to 1906, sparked by Charles Parham.
- Oneness Pentecostalism — a nontrinitarian, namely "Jesus Only", movement within Pentecostalism that began in 1913.
- Restoration Movement, a.k.a. Campbellism — groups that began during the Second Great Awakening (1790–1840) and idealized early Christianity.
- Universalist Church of America's first regional conference was founded in 1793.

=== Other ===
- Black Hebrew Israelites movement originated at the end of the 19th century, when Frank Cherry and William Saunders Crowdy both claimed to have received visions that African Americans are descendants of the Bible Hebrews. They practice blend of both Christianity and Judaism.
- Goddess movement is a widespread non-centralized trend in modern Paganism with the Goddess veneration, which emerged in the late 1960s. Its belief systems range from monotheistic to polytheistic. Only in the US, it was estimated to have 500,000 members.
- Eckankar is new religious movement founded in Las Vegas in 1965 by Paul Twitchell and drawing from the Radha Soami new Indian movement.
- Humanistic Judaism is a nontheistic worldwide movement that emphasizes Jewish culture and history as the sources of Jewish identity. Originated in Detroit, Michigan in 1963 with the founding figure, Reform rabbi Sherwin Wine, in 1969 was established the Society for Humanistic Judaism.
- "I AM" Activity is a neo-Theosophical movement founded in the early 1930s by Guy Ballard and his wife Edna Anne Wheeler Ballard in Chicago, Illinois. It was a major precursor of several New Age religions. The movement had up to a million followers in 1938 and is still active today on a smaller scale.
- International Society for Krishna Consciousness (ISKCON) or Hare Krishna movement, which founded in 1966 in New York City by A. C. Bhaktivedanta Swami Prabhupada. It preaches Gaudiya Vaishnavism, a sect of Hinduism
- Nation of Islam is a non-orthodox new Islamic movement founded by Wallace Fard Muhammad in 1930 that focuses its attention on the African Americans. It was estimated to have 50,000 members.
- Native American Church, also known as Peyotism and Peyote Religion, formed by Quanah Parker but beginning in 1800 and incorporating in 1918. Today it is the most widespread indigenous religion among Native Americans in the United States (except Alaska Natives and Native Hawaiians), with an estimated 250,000 followers.
- Neoshamanism, the origin of this broad movement has been traced to the second half of the 20th century, especially to two American anthropologists who are seen as promoting and spreading neoshamanic ideas and associated with them teachings and movements, namely Carlos Castaneda's Tensegrity and Michael Harner's Core Shamanism.
- New Thought Movement—two of the early proponents of New Thought beliefs during the mid to late 19th century were Phineas Parkhurst Quimby and the Mother of New Thought, Emma Curtis Hopkins. The three major branches are Religious Science, Unity Church and Divine Science.
- Reconstructionist Judaism, which founded by Mordecai Kaplan and started in the 1920s.
- Self-Realization Fellowship is a neo-Hindu movement founded in Los Angeles by Paramahansa Yogananda in 1920.
- Spiritualism is a movement developed and reached its largest following, accomplishing mediums and through various spiritualist churches, from the 1840s to the 1920s, especially in English-speaking countries, and beliefs that contact with spirits is possible, and that spirits are more advanced than humans.
- Theosophy is an influential esoteric religion established during the late 19th century by Helena Blavatsky.
- Unitarian Universalist Association was founded in 1961 from the consolidation of the American Unitarian Association and the Universalist Church of America. Historically Christian denominations, the UUA is no longer Christian and is the largest Unitarian Universalist denomination in the world.
- 3HO is a sect of Sikhism, founded in Los Angeles in 1971 by Yogi Bhajan and followed mostly by White Americans.

== Statistics and measuring religion ==
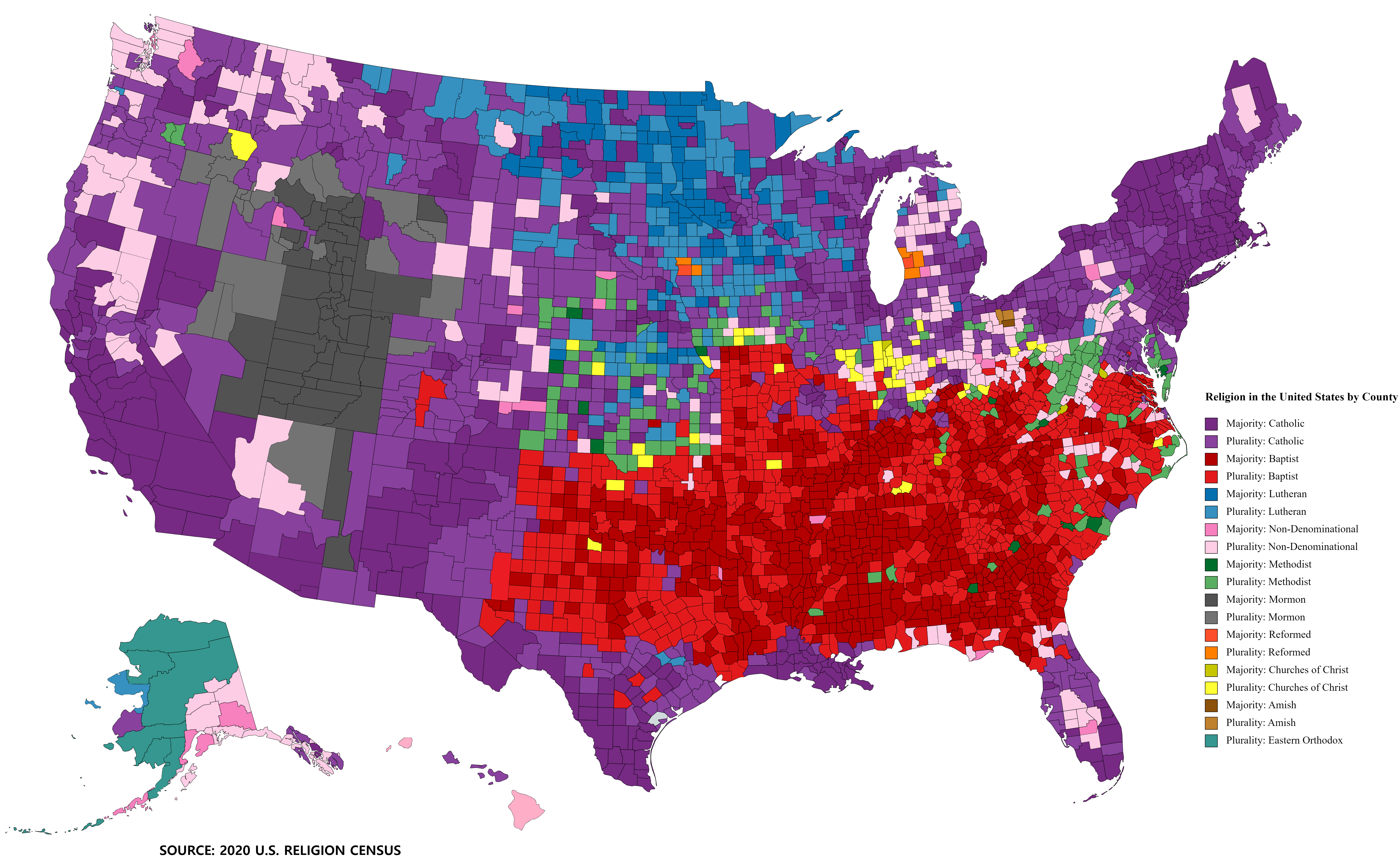
Largest religious dominant in the United States by county, according to the 2020 Religion Census (not to be confused with government-run 2020 census)

Self-identified religiosity (2023 The Wall Street Journal-NORC poll)
1. Very religious (17%)
2. Moderately religious (31%)
3. Slightly religious (23%)
4. Not religious at all (29%)

The US census does not ask about religion. Various groups have conducted surveys to determine approximate percentages of those affiliated with each religious group.

=== Census and independent polling ===
Since the first American census in 1790, census forms have never asked the religion of participants, with Vincent P. Barabba, former head of the United States Census Bureau, stating in April 1976 that "asking such a question in the decennial census, in which replies are mandatory, would appear to infringe upon the traditional separation of church and state" and "could affect public cooperation in the census". Data on religious affiliation comes from independent pollsters by the Pew Research Center and other agencies or, on membership, from religious associations, such as the Yearbook of American and Canadian Churches of the National Council of Churches.

=== Problems measuring religion ===
==== Inaccuracies of independent polling ====
Independent polling results on religion are questionable due to numerous factors:

- polls consistently fail to predict political election outcomes, signifying consistent failure to capture the actual views of the population
- very low response rates for all polls since the 1990s
- biases in wording or topic affect how people respond to polls
- polls categorize people based on limited choices
- polls often generalize broadly
- polls have shallow or superficial choices, which complicate capturing complexity of religious beliefs and practices
- poll interviewer and respondent fatigue is very common

Researchers note that an estimated 20-40% of the population changes their self-reported religious affiliation/identity over time due to numerous factors and that usually it is their answers on surveys that change, not necessarily their religious practices or beliefs.

Researchers advise caution when looking at the "Nones" demographics on surveys because different surveys systematically have discrepancies that amount to 8% and growing of estimates, part of it being that the respondents on surveys are not consistent and also the questions asked are worded differently, generating consistent discrepancies in responses.

According to Gallup there are variations on the responses based on how they ask questions. They routinely ask on complex things like belief in God since the early 2000s in 3 different wordings and they constantly receive 3 different percentages in responses.

=== The Association of Religion Data Archives (1900-2050) ===
Major Religions
Year	All Christians	Non-Religious	Jewish	Muslim	Buddhists
1900	97.0	1.3	1.4		
1950	93.1	3.3	3.1	0.1	
1970	91.3	5.2	2.6	0.4	0.1
2000	82.0	12.0	1.9	1.2	1.2
2020	74.2	19.7	1.7	1.4	1.3
2050(P)	66.3	25.8	1.3	2.6	1.8

Major Christian Denominations
Year	Protestant	Independents	Unaffiliated Christian	Catholic	Orthodox
1900	48.7	8.8	24.8	14.2	0.5
1950	37.0	15.1	20.1	19.2	1.7
1970	28.8	17.8	19.6	23.1	2.1
2000	21.0	20.2	16.4	22.4	2.0
2020	16.3	19.3	14.1	22.3	2.2
2050(P)	15.8	19.1	8.0	21.1	2.3

=== Religious affiliation in the United States by state (Pew Research Center, 2023-2024) ===
Data source: Pew Research Center, Religious Landscape Study, 2023-2024
State	Evangelical Protestant	Mainline Protestant	Historically Black Protestant	Catholic	Latter-day Saint (Mormon)	Orthodox Christian	Jehovah Witness	Other Christian	Jewish	Muslim	Buddhist	Hindu	Other world religions	Something else	Atheist	Agnostic	Nothing in particular
United States	23	11	5	19	2	1	<1	1	2	1	1	1	<1	2	5	6	19
Alabama	43	10	13	6	<1	<1	<1	1	<1	1	1	<1	<1	1	3	2	18
Alaska	26	9	1	15	3	1	<1	2	1	<1	1	<1	1	4	3	9	21
Arizona	19	10	1	21	5	<1	1	1	1	1	2	2	<1	2	3	5	22
Arkansas	50	13	8	5	<1	1	<1	1	<1	<1	<1	<1	1	1	2	4	12
California	16	8	2	25	1	1	1	1	2	1	2	2	1	1	6	7	20
Colorado	17	13	<1	14	3	1	1	2	2	<1	1	<1	1	3	8	10	22
Connecticut	6	11	2	35	<1	2	1	<1	3	4	1	1	<1	1	4	5	21
Delaware	19	16	15	19	<1	<1	<1	1	2	<1	<1	2	<1	2	3	6	15
Florida	22	9	7	22	1	1	1	1	3	1	2	1	<1	2	4	5	18
Georgia	33	10	14	8	1	1	<1	<1	1	1	1	2	<1	2	3	3	20
Hawaii	20	14	4	16	4	1	<1	1	<1	<1	5	<1	2	2	3	5	22
Idaho	31	7	<1	9	14	<1	<1	<1	<1	2	<1	<1	<1	2	6	6	22
Illinois	16	13	7	23	<1	2	<1	<1	2	3	1	1	<1	2	5	5	19
Indiana	32	11	3	16	1	<1	1	<1	<1	1	1	<1	<1	2	5	4	21
Iowa	21	25	1	15	1	<1	<1	1	<1	<1	<1	<1	<1	4	3	6	22
Kansas	27	18	3	19	2	1	<1	1	<1	<1	<1	<1	<1	<1	3	4	21
Kentucky	46	11	2	11	1	<1	<1	<1	<1	1	<1	<1	<1	2	3	6	15
Louisiana	33	6	11	23	1	<1	1	<1	<1	<1	2	<1	<1	2	4	1	17
Maine	22	13	1	14	1	<1	<1	1	1	<1	2	<1	<1	6	5	9	25
Maryland	15	13	15	12	<1	2	<1	1	<1	3	4	<1	1	1	6	7	19
Massachusetts	8	10	3	29	<1	2	<1	<1	2	2	1	<1	<1	2	8	5	25
Michigan	21	14	5	19	1	<1	<1	1	1	1	1	<1	<1	2	4	5	22
Minnesota	20	22	1	18	<1	<1	<1	1	<1	3	<1	<1	1	2	5	9	15
Mississippi	42	9	20	5	<1	<1	1	<1	<1	<1	<1	<1	<1	1	4	2	13
Missouri	31	10	5	14	1	<1	<1	1	<1	<1	<1	<1	<1	3	5	8	20
Montana	28	11	<1	12	3	<1	<1	<1	<1	<1	2	<1	<1	4	8	12	19
Nebraska	31	22	<1	20	<1	<1	<1	1	<1	1	1	<1	<1	1	2	4	16
Nevada	18	9	6	21	5	<1	<1	1	1	1	1	<1	<1	1	3	8	24
New Hampshire	10	13	1	20	1	1	<1	<1	1	<1	<1	<1	<1	4	11	8	29
New Jersey	9	10	5	33	<1	1	<1	<1	1	5	2	<1	3	1	5	6	17
New Mexico	25	6	1	27	1	<1	<1	2	<1	<1	<1	1	<1	3	6	5	20
New York	10	10	5	29	1	1	<1	1	6	3	1	1	<1	2	5	5	17
North Carolina	35	13	11	7	1	1	<1	1	1	1	<1	<1	<1	3	4	5	17
North Dakota	21	25	3	23	1	<1	<1	<1	<1	<1	1	<1	<1	1	3	3	17
Ohio	26	16	4	16	<1	1	<1	1	1	1	1	<1	<1	2	5	5	19
Oklahoma	47	11	4	8	1	<1	<1	<1	1	<1	<1	<1	<1	2	5	9	12
Oregon	25	8	<1	8	1	<1	<1	<1	2	<1	<1	1	1	5	8	12	23
Pennsylvania	19	15	5	22	1	<1	<1	<1	2	1	<1	1	<1	1	5	5	20
Rhode Island	12	7	3	39	<1	1	<1	1	1	<1	<1	2	<1	2	3	6	22
South Carolina	39	13	17	7	<1	<1	<1	1	<1	2	<1	<1	<1	3	3	3	9
South Dakota	34	25	2	16	<1	1	1	1	<1	<1	1	<1	<1	1	1	4	13
Tennessee	45	12	6	7	1	1	<1	1	<1	<1	1	<1	<1	1	4	5	15
Texas	27	10	5	22	1	<1	1	<1	<1	2	<1	1	<1	1	4	5	18
Utah	3	5	<1	4	50	<1	<1	<1	<1	1	<1	<1	<1	1	4	10	20
Vermont	8	17	<1	18	1	<1	<1	1	2	<1	<1	1	1	5	8	8	29
Virginia	25	14	10	10	1	1	<1	<1	2	1	<1	<1	1	1	6	6	16
Washington	23	9	1	14	3	<1	<1	<1	1	2	3	1	1	3	9	11	17
West Virginia	37	21	2	3	1	<1	<1	<1	<1	<1	1	<1	<1	2	4	4	24
Wisconsin	19	18	2	20	<1	1	<1	1	1	<1	1	1	<1	2	5	9	20
Wyoming	23	19	<1	12	6	1	<1	<1	<1	<1	<1	<1	<1	3	5	5	24

=== Public Religion Research Institute data (2020) ===
The Public Religion Research Institute (PRRI) has made annual estimates about religious adherence in the United States every year since 2013, and they most recently updated their data in 2020. Their data can be broken down to the state level, and data has also been made available of several large metro areas. Data is collected from roughly 50,000 telephone interviews conducted every year.

Their most recent data shows that approximately 70% of Americans are Christians (down from 71% in 2013), with about 46% of the population professing belief in Protestant Christianity, and another 22% adhering to Catholicism. About 23% of the population adheres to no religion, and 7% more of the population professes a Non-Christian religion (such as Judaism, Islam, or Hinduism).

Religion in the United States according to the American Values Atlas published by the PRRI (2020)
Religious Affiliation	National %	South %	West %	Midwest %	Northeast %
Christian	69.7	74	65	72	67
Protestant	45.6	53	36	50	39
White Evangelical	14.5	18	10	18	9
White Mainline Protestant	16.4	17	14	21	15
Black Protestant	7.3	10	3	6	8
Hispanic Protestant	3.9	4	5	2	4
Other non-white Protestant	3.5	4	4	3	3
Catholic	21.8	19	24	21	26
White Catholic	11.7	9	9	15	16
Hispanic Catholic	8.2	8	13	4	8
Other non-white Catholic	1.9	2	2	2	2
Mormon	1.3	1	4	1	1
Jehovah's Witness	0.5	1	1	0	0
Orthodox Christian	0.5	0	0	0	1
Unaffiliated	23.3	21	27	22	24
Non-Christian	7.0	5	8	6	9
Jewish	1.4	1	1	1	3
Muslim	0.8	1	1	1	1
Buddhist	0.8	1	1	1	1
Hindu	0.5	0	1	0	1
Other non-Christian	3.5	2	4	3	3
Total	100	100	100	100	100

=== 2014 Pew Research Center data ===
A map showing plurality religious denominations by state as of 2023 to 2024, according to the Pew Research Center. Protestant 70 – 79% 60 – 69% 50 – 59% 40 – 49% Under 40% Catholic 40 – 49% Under 40% Mormon 50 - 59% Unaffiliated 40 - 49% Under 40%

Religion in the United States according to the Pew Research Center (2014)
Affiliation	% of US population
Christian	70.6
Protestant	46.5
Evangelical Protestant	25.4
Mainline Protestant	14.7
Black church	6.5
Catholic	20.8
Mormon	1.6
Jehovah's Witnesses	0.8
Eastern Orthodox	0.5
Other Christian	0.4
Unaffiliated	22.8
Nothing in particular	15.8
Agnostic	4.0
Atheist	3.1
Non-Christian	5.9
Jewish	1.9
Muslim	0.9
Buddhist	0.7
Hindu	0.7
Other non-Christian	1.8
Don't know/refused answer	0.6
Total	100

=== 2010 ASARB data ===
The map above shows plurality religious denomination by state as of 2010 according to a survey of religious denominations. Protestantism 60%+ 50 - 59% 40 - 49% 30 - 49% Catholicism 60%+ 50 - 59% 40 - 49% 30 - 39% Mormonism 60%+ 30 - 39%

The Association of Statisticians of American Religious Bodies (ASARB) surveyed congregations for their memberships. Churches were asked for their membership numbers. Adjustments were made for those congregations that did not respond and for religious groups that reported only adult membership. ASARB estimates that most of the churches not responding were black Protestant congregations. Significant difference in results from other databases include the lower representation of adherents of (1) all kinds (62.7%), (2) Christians (59.9%), (3) Protestants (less than 36%); and the greater number of unaffiliated (37.3%).

Percentage of religion against average, 2001 Major | >10% | >20% Catholic Baptist Lutheran Methodist No religion Mormonism Protestant Pentecostal Christian (unspecified/other)

Plurality of religious preference by state in 2014.: <20% / <30% / <40% / <50% / >50%; / / / / / Baptist; / / / / / Catholic; / / / / / Mormon; / / / / / Lutheran

Religious groups
Religious group	Number in year 2010	% in year 2010
Total US pop year 2010	308,745,538	100.0%
Evangelical Protestant	50,013,107	16.2%
Mainline Protestant	22,568,258	7.3%
Black Protestant	4,877,067	1.6%
Protestant total	77,458,432	25.1%
Catholic	58,934,906	19.1%
Orthodox	1,056,535	0.3%
adherents (unadjusted)	150,596,792	48.8%
unclaimed	158,148,746	51.2%
other – including Mormon & Christ Scientist	13,146,919	4.3%
The Church of Jesus Christ of Latter Day Saints (Mormon, LDS)	6,144,582	2.0%
other – excluding Mormon	7,002,337	2.3%
Jewish estimate	6,141,325	2.0%
Buddhist estimate	2,000,000	0.7%
Muslim estimate	2,600,082	0.8%
Hindu estimate	400,000	0.4%
Source: ASARB

=== Ethnicity ===
The table below shows the religious affiliations among the ethnicities in the United States, according to the Pew Forum 2014 survey. People of Black ethnicity were most likely to be part of a formal religion, with 80% percent being Christians. Protestant denominations make up the majority of the Christians in the ethnicities.

Religion	Non-Hispanic White (62%)	Black (13%)	Hispanic (17%)	Other/mixed (8%)
Christian	70%	79%	77%	49%
Protestant	48%	71%	26%	33%
Catholic	19%	5%	48%	13%
Mormon	2%	<0.5%	1%	1%
Jehovah's Witness	<0.5%	2%	1%	1%
Orthodox	1%	<0.5%	<0.5%	1%
Other	<0.5%	1%	<0.5%	1%
Non-Christian faiths	5%	3%	2%	21%
Jewish	3%	<0.5%	1%	1%
Muslim	<0.5%	2%	<0.5%	3%
Buddhist	<0.5%	<0.5%	1%	4%
Hindu	<0.5%	<0.5%	<0.5%	8%
Other world religions	<0.5%	<0.5%	<0.5%	2%
Other faiths	2%	1%	1%	2%
Unaffiliated (including atheist and agnostic)	24%	18%	20%	29%

=== ARIS findings regarding self-identification ===
The United States government does not collect religious data in its census. The survey below, the American Religious Identification Survey (ARIS) of 2008, was a random digit-dialed telephone survey of 54,461 American residential households in the contiguous United States. The 1990 sample size was 113,723; 2001 sample size was 50,281.

Adult respondents were asked the open-ended question, "What is your religion, if any?" Interviewers did not prompt or offer a suggested list of potential answers. The religion of the spouse or partner was also asked. If the initial answer was "Protestant" or "Christian" further questions were asked to probe which particular denomination. About one third of the sample was asked more detailed demographic questions.

Religious Self-Identification of the US Adult Population: 1990, 2001, 2008
Figures are not adjusted for refusals to reply; investigators suspect refusals are possibly more representative of "no religion" than any other group.

Source: ARIS 2008
Group	1990 adults x 1,000	2001 adults x 1,000	2008 adults x 1,000	Numerical Change 1990– 2008 as % of 1990	1990 % of adults	2001 % of adults	2008 % of adults	change in % of total adults 1990– 2008
Adult population, total	175,440	207,983	228,182	30.1%				
Adult population, responded	171,409	196,683	216,367	26.2%	97.7%	94.6%	94.8%	−2.9%
Total Christian	151,225	159,514	173,402	14.7%	86.2%	76.7%	76.0%	−10.2%
Catholic	46,004	50,873	57,199	24.3%	26.2%	24.5%	25.1%	−1.2%
non-Catholic Christian	105,221	108,641	116,203	10.4%	60.0%	52.2%	50.9%	−9.0%
Baptist	33,964	33,820	36,148	6.4%	19.4%	16.3%	15.8%	−3.5%
Mainline Christian	32,784	35,788	29,375	−10.4%	18.7%	17.2%	12.9%	−5.8%
Methodist	14,174	14,039	11,366	−19.8%	8.1%	6.8%	5.0%	−3.1%
Lutheran	9,110	9,580	8,674	−4.8%	5.2%	4.6%	3.8%	−1.4%
Presbyterian	4,985	5,596	4,723	−5.3%	2.8%	2.7%	2.1%	−0.8%
Episcopal/Anglican	3,043	3,451	2,405	−21.0%	1.7%	1.7%	1.1%	−0.7%
United Church of Christ	438	1,378	736	68.0%	0.2%	0.7%	0.3%	0.1%
Christian Generic	25,980	22,546	32,441	24.9%	14.8%	10.8%	14.2%	−0.6%
Christian Unspecified	8,073	14,190	16,384	102.9%	4.6%	6.8%	7.2%	2.6%
Non-denominational Christian	194	2,489	8,032	4040.2%	0.1%	1.2%	3.5%	3.4%
Protestant – Unspecified	17,214	4,647	5,187	−69.9%	9.8%	2.2%	2.3%	−7.5%
Evangelical/Born Again	546	1,088	2,154	294.5%	0.3%	0.5%	0.9%	0.6%
Pentecostal/Charismatic	5,647	7,831	7,948	40.7%	3.2%	3.8%	3.5%	0.3%
Pentecostal – Unspecified	3,116	4,407	5,416	73.8%	1.8%	2.1%	2.4%	0.6%
Assemblies of God	617	1,105	810	31.3%	0.4%	0.5%	0.4%	0.0%
Church of God	590	943	663	12.4%	0.3%	0.5%	0.3%	0.0%
Other Protestant Denominations	4,630	5,949	7,131	54.0%	2.6%	2.9%	3.1%	0.5%
Churches of Christ	1,769	2,593	1,921	8.6%	1.0%	1.2%	0.8%	−0.2%
Jehovah's Witness	1,381	1,331	1,914	38.6%	0.8%	0.6%	0.8%	0.1%
Seventh-Day Adventist	668	724	938	40.4%	0.4%	0.3%	0.4%	0.0%
Mormon/Latter Day Saints	2,487	2,697	3,158	27.0%	1.4%	1.3%	1.4%	0.0%
Total non-Christian religions	5,853	7,740	8,796	50.3%	3.3%	3.7%	3.9%	0.5%
Jewish	3,137	2,837	2,680	−14.6%	1.8%	1.4%	1.2%	−0.6%
Eastern Religions	687	2,020	1,961	185.4%	0.4%	1.0%	0.9%	0.5%
Buddhist	404	1,082	1,189	194.3%	0.2%	0.5%	0.5%	0.3%
Muslim	527	1,104	1,349	156.0%	0.3%	0.5%	0.6%	0.3%
New Religious Movements & Others	1,296	1,770	2,804	116.4%	0.7%	0.9%	1.2%	0.5%
None/No religion, total	14,331	29,481	34,169	138.4%	8.2%	14.2%	15.0%	6.8%
Agnostic+Atheist	1,186	1,893	3,606	204.0%	0.7%	0.9%	1.6%	0.9%
Did Not Know/Refused to reply	4,031	11,300	11,815	193.1%	2.3%	5.4%	5.2%	2.9%

Highlights:

1. The ARIS 2008 survey was carried out during February–November 2008 and collected answers from 54,461 respondents who were questioned in English or Spanish.
2. The American population self-identifies as predominantly Christian, but Americans are slowly becoming less Christian.
  - 86% of American adults identified as Christians in 1990 and 76% in 2008.
  - The historic mainline churches and denominations have experienced the steepest declines, while the non-denominational Christian identity has been trending upward, particularly since 2001.
  - The challenge to Christianity in the US does not come from other religions but rather from a rejection of all forms of organized religion.
3. 34% of American adults considered themselves "Born Again or Evangelical Christians" in 2008.
4. The US population continues to show signs of becoming less religious, with one out of every seven Americans failing to indicate a religious identity in 2008.
  - The "Nones" (no stated religious preference, atheist, or agnostic) continue to grow, though at a much slower pace than in the 1990s, from 8.2% in 1990, to 14.1% in 2001, to 15.0% in 2008.
  - Asian Americans are substantially more likely to indicate no religious identity than other racial or ethnic groups.
5. One sign of the lack of attachment of Americans to religion is that 27% do not expect a religious funeral at their death.
6. Based on their stated beliefs rather than their religious identification in 2008, 70% of Americans believe in a personal God, roughly 12% of Americans are atheist (no God) or agnostic (unknowable or unsure), and another 12% are deistic (a higher power but no personal God).
7. America's religious geography has been transformed since 1990. Religious switching along with Hispanic immigration has significantly changed the religious profile of some states and regions. Between 1990 and 2008, the Catholic population proportion of the New England states fell from 50% to 36% and in New York fell from 44% to 37%, while it rose in California from 29% to 37% and in Texas from 23% to 32%.
8. Overall the 1990–2008 ARIS time series shows that changes in religious self-identification in the first decade of the 21st century have been moderate in comparison to the 1990s, which was a period of significant shifts in the religious composition of the United States.

=== 2024 Barna Group findings ===
The media estimates of the number of adult US citizens who consider themselves evangelicals is too high according to 2024 data from the American Worldview Inventory 2024 (AWVI 2024, organized by the Cultural Research Center located at the Arizona Christian University, under the leadership of researcher George Barna). Rather than the conventional estimate of 25% to 40%, only 10% of adult US citizens consider themselves evangelicals, and of that 10% self-identifying as evangelicals, roughly two thirds do not follow major points of Christian Evangelical doctrine.

=== Attendance ===
Church, synagogue, or mosque attendance by state (2014) ≥50% attending weekly 45-49% attending weekly 40-44% attending weekly 35-39% attending weekly 30-34% attending weekly 25-29% attending weekly 20-24% attending weekly 15-19% attending weekly

Gallup survey data found that 73% of Americans were members of a church, synagogue or mosque in 1937, peaking at 76% shortly after World War II, before trending slightly downward to 70% by 2000. The percentage declined steadily during the first two decades of the 21st century, reaching 47% in 2020. Gallup attributed the decline to increasing numbers of Americans expressing no religious preference.

A 2013 Public Religion Research Institute survey reported that 31% of Americans attend religious services at least weekly. According to a 2022 Gallup poll, 75% of Americans report praying often or sometimes and religion plays a very (46%) or fairly (26%) important role in their lives.

In a 2009 Gallup survey, 41.6% of American residents stated that they attended a church, synagogue, or mosque once a week or almost every week. This percentage is higher than other surveyed Western countries. Church attendance varies considerably by state and region. The figures, updated to 2014, ranged from 51% in Utah to 17% in Vermont.

When it comes to mosque attendance specifically, data collected by a 2017 poll by the Institute for Social Policy and Understanding (ISPU) shows that American Muslim women and men attend the mosque at similar rates (45% for men and 35% for women). Additionally, when compared to the general public looking at the attendance of religious services, young Muslim Americans attend the mosque at closer rates to older Muslim Americans. Muslim Americans who regularly attend mosques are more likely to work with their neighbors to solve community problems (49 vs. 30 percent), be registered to vote (74 vs. 49 percent), and plan to vote (92 vs. 81 percent). Overall, "there is no correlation between Muslim attitudes toward violence and their frequency of mosque attendance".

== Religion and politics ==
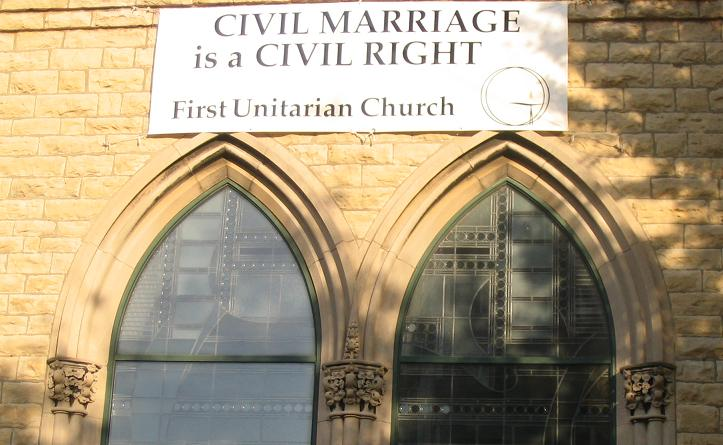
The US guarantees freedom of religion, and some churches in the US take strong stances on political subjects.

In August 2010, 67% of Americans said religion was losing influence, compared with 59% who said this in 2006. Majorities of white evangelical Protestants (79%), white mainline Protestants (67%), black Protestants (56%), Catholics (71%), and the religiously unaffiliated (62%) all agreed that religion was losing influence on American life; 53% of the total public said this was a bad thing, while just 10% see it as a good thing.

Politicians frequently discuss their religion when campaigning, and fundamentalists and black Protestants are highly politically active. However, to keep their status as tax-exempt organizations they must not officially endorse a candidate. Historically Catholics were heavily Democratic before the 1970s, while mainline Protestants comprised the core of the Republican Party. Those patterns have faded away—Catholics, for example, now split about 50–50. However, white evangelicals since 1980 have made up a solidly Republican group that favors conservative candidates. Secular voters are increasingly Democratic.

Only four presidential candidates for major parties have been Catholics, all for the Democratic party:

- Alfred E. Smith in presidential election of 1928 was subjected to anti-Catholic rhetoric, which seriously hurt him in the Baptist areas of the South and Lutheran areas of the Midwest, but he did well in the Catholic urban strongholds of the Northeast.
- John F. Kennedy secured the Democratic presidential nomination in 1960. In the 1960 election, Kennedy faced accusations that as a Catholic president he would do as the Pope would tell him to do, a charge that Kennedy refuted in a famous address to Protestant ministers.
- John Kerry, a Catholic, won the Democratic presidential nomination in 2004. In the 2004 election religion was hardly an issue, and most Catholics voted for his Protestant opponent George W. Bush.
- Joe Biden, a Catholic, won the Democratic presidential nomination in 2020, and then won the 2020 presidential election, becoming the second Catholic president, after John F. Kennedy. Biden was also the first Catholic vice president.

Joe Lieberman was the first major presidential candidate that was Jewish, on the Gore–Lieberman campaign of 2000 (although John Kerry and Barry Goldwater both had Jewish ancestry, they were practicing Christians). Bernie Sanders ran against Hillary Clinton in the Democratic primary of 2016. He was the first major Jewish candidate to compete in the presidential primary process. However, Sanders noted during the campaign that he does not actively practice any religion.

In 2006 Keith Ellison of Minnesota became the first Muslim elected to Congress; when re-enacting his swearing-in for photos, he used the copy of the Qur'an once owned by Thomas Jefferson. André Carson is the second Muslim to serve in Congress.

A Gallup poll released in 2007 indicated that 53% of Americans would refuse to vote for an atheist as president, up from 48% in 1987 and 1999. But then the number started to drop again and reached record low 43% in 2012 and 40% in 2015.

Mitt Romney, the Republican presidential nominee in 2012, is Mormon and a member of the Church of Jesus Christ of Latter-day Saints. He is the former governor of the state of Massachusetts, and his father George Romney was the governor of the state of Michigan.

On January 3, 2013, Tulsi Gabbard became the first Hindu member of Congress, using a copy of the Bhagavad Gita while swearing-in.

== By age ==
=== Adults ===
==== Religious affiliation ====
Self-identified religious affiliation among 18-29 year olds (Spring 2023 Harvard Youth Poll)
1. Unaffiliated (33%)
2. Catholicism (19%)
3. Evangelical Christian (14%)
4. Mainline Protestant (8%)
5. LDS/Mormon (2%)
6. Judaism (2%)
7. Muslim (2%)
8. Other religion (7%)
9. Not sure (6%)
10. Decline to answer/Refuse (7%)

Religious affiliation according to Religious Landscape Study in 2023–2024 by age group
Religion	18-29	30-49	50-64	65+
Christianity	45%	54%	72%	78%
Judaism	2%	2%	1%	2%
Islam	2%	1%	1%	<1%
Buddhism	1%	1%	1%	1%
Hinduism	1%	1%	1%	<1%
Other world religions	<1%	<1%	<1%	<1%
"Something else"	3%	2%	1%	1%
Unaffiliated	44%	37%	22%	15%
No answer	1%	1%	2%	2%

==== Frequency of prayer ====
Prayer frequency by age group in 2023-2024 Religious Landscape Study
Reported frequency	18-29	30-49	50-64	65+
"At least daily"	28%	39%	52%	55%
Weekly or monthly	28%	24%	22%	20%
Seldom or never	44%	37%	25%	24%
No answer	0%	1%	1%	1%

=== Teenagers (13-17 years old) ===
The Pew Research Center in 2020 reported that teenagers have lower levels of affiliation with Christianity than their parents and have higher levels of non-affiliation. The gender gap among teenagers was not significant in the poll; comparatively among adults women tend to be more religious than men.

Religious affiliations among teenagers (13–17 years old) compared to their parents
Religion	Teenagers	Parents of teenagers
Christianity	63%	72%
Judaism	1%	1%
Islam	1%	1%
Buddhism	1%	1%
Hinduism	1%	1%
Other world religions	<1	<1
"Something else"	<1	<1
Unaffiliated	32%	24%
No answer	1%	<1%

== By gender ==
According to the 2023-2024 Religious Landscape Study done by Pew Research Center, women are more likely to be religious than men in terms of affiliation.

=== Religious affiliation ===
Year	2023-2024		2014	
Religion	Men	Women	Men	Women
Christianity	59%	66%	66%	75%
Judaism	2%	1%	2%	2%
Islam	1%	1%	1%	1%
Buddhism	1%	1%	1%	1%
Hinduism	1%	<1%	1%	<1%
Other world religions	<1%	<1%	<1%	<1%
"Something else"	2%	2%	2%	1%
Unaffiliated	31%	27%	27%	19%
No answer	1%	1%	1%	1%

=== Frequency of prayer ===
Reported prayer frequency	Men	Women
"At least daily"	37%	50%
Weekly or monthly	23%	23%
Seldom or never	39%	26%
No answer	1%	1%

== Theism, religion, morality, and politics ==
=== Pew Research Center ===
The Pew Research Center has routinely conducted surveys surrounding theism, religion, and morality since 2002, asking:

Which of the following statements comes closest to your opinion?

And whether they feel like:

[Option #1:] It is not necessary to believe in God in order to be moral and have good values.

Or:

[Option #2:] It is necessary to believe in God in order to be moral and have good values.

Online survey trends: Is it necessary to believe in God to be a good person?

Polling Date	Necessary	Not necessary	Unsure/Refused/Other
Spring 2022	34	65	1
January 2020	35	65	1
September 2019	36	63	1
December 2017	33	66	>0
July 2014	44	55	1

Telephone trends: Is it necessary to believe in God to be a good person?

Is it necessary to believe in God to be a good person?	Necessary	Not necessary	Don't Know/Unsure/other
Spring 2019	44	54	2
Spring 2011	53	46	2
Spring 2007	57	41	2
Summer 2002	58	40	2

=== YouGov America ===
==== Is it necessary to believe in God to be a good person? ====
Survey Polling Date	Necessary	Not Necessary	Don't Know/Unsure/Other
November 17–21, 2022	32	53	15

==== Effect of churches and religious organizations on morality ====
Survey Polling Date	Strengthen morality in society	Don't make much difference to morality in society	Don't Know	Weaken morality in society
November 17–21, 2022	47	26	14	13

== See also ==
- American civil religion
- Christianity in the United States
- Confucianism in the United States
- Church property disputes in the United States
- Freedom of religion in the United States
- Historical religious demographics of the United States
- List of religious movements that began in the United States
- List of U.S. states and territories by religiosity
- Protestantism in the United States
- Relationship between religion and science
- Religion in United States prisons
- School prayer in the United States
- Separation of church and state in the United States
- Televangelism

== Bibliography ==
The following list of selected printed bibliographies on the topic includes both cited works and further reading.

- Aberle, David F. (1991) [1982]. The Peyote Religion among the Navajo. With Harvey C. Moore and Denis F. Johnston (2nd ed.). Norman, Ok; London: University of Oklahoma Press. ISBN 0-8061-2382-6.
- Adler, Margot (2006) [1979]. Drawing Down the Moon: Witches, Druids, Goddess-Worshippers, and Other Pagans in America Today (Reprint rev. and expand. ed.). New York: Penguin/Arcana. ISBN 0-14-019536-X. | at Archive.org
- Ahlstrom, Sydney E. (2004) [1972]. A Religious History of the American People (2nd ed.). New Haven, Conn: Yale University Press. ISBN 0-30010-012-4.
- Alba, Richard; Raboteau, Albert; DeWind, Josh, eds. (2008). Immigration and Religion in America: Comparative and Historical Perspectives. American Journal of Sociology. New York: New York University Press. ISBN 9780814705049.
- Albanese, Catherine L. (2007). A Republic of Mind and Spirit: A Cultural History of American Metaphysical Religion. New Haven, Conn; London: Yale University Press. ISBN 9780300136159.
- Alexander, Estrelda Y., ed. (2018). The Dictionary of Pan-African Pentecostalism. Volume One: North America. Eugene, Or: Cascade Books. ISBN 978-1-4982-8477-6.
- Ammerman, Nancy T. (1991). "North American Protestant Fundamentalism". In Marty, Martin E.; Appleby, R. Scott (eds.). Fundamentalisms Observed. The Fundamentalism Project, 1. Chicago, Il; London: University of Chicago Press. pp. 1–65. ISBN 0-226-50878-1.
- Anderson, Owanah (1988). Jamestown Commitment: the Episcopal Church and the American Indian. Cincinnati, Ohio: Forward Movement Pub. ISBN 0-88028-082-4.
- Ariel, Yaakov (2000). Evangelizing the Chosen People: Missions to the Jews in America, 1880–2000. Chapel Hill, NC; London: University of North Carolina Press. ISBN 0-8078-2566-2. OCLC 43708450.
- Askew, Thomas A.; Spellman, Peter W. (1984). The Churches and the American Experiment: Ideals and Institutions.
- Backman, Milton V. Jr. (1983). Christian Churches of America: Origins and Beliefs (2nd, rev. ed.). New York: Charles Scribner's Sons. ISBN 0-02-305090-X.
- Balmer, Randall Herbert; Winner, Lauren F. (2002). Protestantism in America. New York: Columbia University Press. ISBN 9780231111300.
- Baltzell, E. Digby (1964). The Protestant Establishment: Aristocracy and Caste in America. New York: Random House.
- Beale, David (2021). Christian Fundamentalism in America: The Story of the Rest from 1857 to 2020.
- Best, Felton O., ed. (1998). Black Religious Leadership from the Slave Community to the Million Man March; flames of fire. Lewiston, NY: Edwin Mellen Press.
- Blankholm, Joseph (2022). The Secular Paradox: On the Religiosity of the Not Religious. New York: New York University Press. ISBN 9781479809509.
- Blankman, Drew; Augustine, Todd (2004). Pocket Dictionary of North American Denominations. Lisle, Il: InterVarsity Press. ISBN 9780830814596.
- Blau, Joseph Leon (1976). Judaism in America. From Curiosity to Third Faith. Chicago, Il: University of Chicago Press. ISBN 0-22605-727-5.
- Bloom, Harold (1992). The American Religion: The Emergence of the Post-Christian Nation. New York: Simon & Schuster. ISBN 0-671-67997-X. | at Archive.org
- Bonomi, Patricia U. (2003) [1986]. Under the Cope of Heaven: Religion, Society, and Politics in Colonial America (updated ed.). New York: Oxford University Press. ISBN 0-19-516217-X. Archived 2012-07-21 at the Wayback Machine
- Bowman, Matthew (2012). The Mormon People: The Making of an American Faith. New York: Random House. ISBN 978-0-679-64490-3.
- Brackney, William H. (2006). Baptists in North America: An Historical Perspective. Blackwell Pub. ISBN 1-4051-1865-2.
- Brown, Brian Edward (1999). Religion, Law, and the Land: Native Americans and the Judicial Interpretations of Sacred Land. Westport, Conn: Greenwood Press. ISBN 978-0-313-30972-4.
- Brown, Joseph Epes (1982). The Spiritual Legacy of the American Indian. New York: Crossroad Pub. Co. ISBN 0-8245-0489-5.
- Brown, Joseph Epes; Cousins, Emily (2001). Teaching Spirits: Understanding Native American Religious Traditions. Oxford; New York: Oxford University Press. ISBN 0-19-513875-9.
- Brown, Michael F. (1997). The Channeling Zone: American Spirituality in an Anxious Age. Cambridge, Ma: Harvard University Press. ISBN 9780674108820.
- Buck, Christopher (2009). Religious myths and visions of America: how minority faiths redefined America's world role. Westport, Conn: Praeger Pub. ISBN 978-0-313-35959-0.
- Burgan, Michael (2003). Buddhist Faith in America. Faith in America. J. Gordon Melton, series editor. New York: Facts On File. ISBN 0-8160-4988-2.
- Burgess, Stanley M.; Maas, Eduard M. van der, eds. (2002a). "Bibliography and Historiography of Pentecostalism in United States". The New International Dictionary of Pentecostal and Charismatic Movements (Rev. and exp. ed.). Grand Rapids, Mi: Zondervan. pp. 382–405. ISBN 978-0-310-22481-5.
- Burgess, Stanley M.; Maas, Eduard M. van der, eds. (2002b). "United States of America". The New International Dictionary of Pentecostal and Charismatic Movements (Rev. and exp. ed.). Grand Rapids, Mi: Zondervan. p. 277. ISBN 978-0-310-22481-5.
- Butler, Diana Hochstedt (1995). Standing Against the Whirlwind: Evangelical Episcopalians in Nineteenth-Century America. Religion in America. New York: Oxford University Press. ISBN 978-0-19-508542-6.
- Butler, Jon, et al. (2011). Religion in American Life: A Short History.
- Buxbaum, Shelley M.; Karesh, Sara E. (2003). Jewish Faith in America. Faith in America. J. Gordon Melton, series editor. New York: Facts On File. ISBN 0-8160-4986-6.
- Calins, Earle Edwin (1964). Christianity in the United States. Chicago, Il: Moody Press.
- Campbell, David; Layman, Geoffrey; Green, John Clifford (2020). Secular Surge: A New Fault Line in American Politics. Cambridge University Press. ISBN 978-1-108-92334-7. OCLC 1237630231.
- Carroll, Bret E. (1997). Spiritualism in Antebellum America. Religion in North America. Bloomington, In: Indiana University Press. ISBN 9780253333155.
- Champagne, Duane (2005). "North American Indian Religions: New Religious Movements". In Lindsay Jones (ed.). Encyclopedia of Religion: 15-volume Set. Vol. 10 (2nd ed.). Farmington Hills, Mi: Macmillan Reference USA – via Encyclopedia.com.
- Chapman, Mark L. (2006). Christianity on trial: African-American religious thought before and after Black power.
- Chaves, Mark (2017). American Religion: Contemporary Trends. Princeton, NJ; London: Princeton University Press. ISBN 9780691177564.
- Chireau, Yvonne Patricia; Deutsch, Nathaniel, eds. (2000). Black Zion: African American Religious Encounters with Judaism. New York: Oxford University Press. ISBN 0-19-511257-1.
- Chryssides, George D. (2016). Jehovah's Witnesses Continuity and Change. Ashgate new religions. Farnham, Surrey: Ashgate Pub. ISBN 978-1-4094-5608-7.
- Clifton, Chas S. (2006). Her Hidden Children: The Rise of Wicca and Paganism in America. Lanham, Md: AltaMira Press. ISBN 978-0-7591-0202-6.
- Collier-Thomas, Bettye (2010). Jesus, jobs, and justice: African American women and religion.
- Curtis, Edward E. (2005). "African-American Islamization Reconsidered: Black history Narratives and Muslim identity." Journal of the American Academy of Religion. Vol. 73. Issue 3. pp. 659–84.
- Davis, Cyprian (1990). The History of Black Catholics in the United States.
- Davis, Derek H.; Hankins, Barry, eds. (2002). New Religious Movements and Religious Liberty in America. Waco, Tx: J. M. Dawson Institute of Church-State Studies; Baylor University Press.
- Dawkins, Richard (2007). "Secularism, the Founding Fathers and the religion of America", in The God Delusion. Black Swan. ISBN 978-0-552-77429-1.
- De La Torre, Miguel A. (2009). Encyclopedia on Hispanic American Religious Culture. 2-volume Set. Santa Barbara, Ca: ABC-Clio.
- Dinges, William D.; Hitchcock, James (1991). "Roman Catholic Traditionalism and Activist Conservatism in the United States". In Marty, Martin E.; Appleby, R. Scott (eds.). Fundamentalisms Observed. The Fundamentalism Project, 1. Chicago, Il; London: University of Chicago Press. pp. 66–141. ISBN 0-226-50878-1.
- Dolan, Jay P. (1992). The American Catholic Experience.
- Drescher, Elizabeth (2016). Choosing our Religion: The Spiritual Lives of America's Nones. New York. ISBN 9780199341221.
- DuPree, Sherry Sherrod (1996). African-American Holiness Pentecostal Movement: An Annotated Bibliography. Religious Information Systems, 4. New York; London: Garland Pub. ISBN 0-8240-1449-9.
- Eck, Diana L. (2001). A New Religious America: How a "Christian Country" Has Now Become the World's Most Religiously Diverse Nation. San Francisco: HarperSanFrancisco. ISBN 0-06-062158-3.
- Eddy, Richard (1884). Universalism in America. New York: Universalist Pub. House.
- Ellwood, Robert S., Jr. (1979). Alternative Altars: Unconventional and Eastern Spirituality in America. Chicago, Il: University of Chicago Press. ISBN 0226206181.
- Ellwood, Robert S. (2000). 1950: Crossroads of American Religious Life. Louisville, Ky: Westminster John Knox Press. ISBN 0664258131.
- Finke, Roger; Stark, Rodney (2005). The Churching of America, 1776–2005: Winners and Losers in Our Religious Economy. New Brunswick, NJ; London: Rutgers University Press. ISBN 0-8135-3553-0.
- FitzGerald, Thomas (2007). "Eastern Christianity in the United States". The Blackwell Companion to Eastern Christianity. Malden, Ma: Blackwell Press. pp. 269–279. ISBN 9780470766392.
- Forsthoefel, Thomas A.; Humes, Cynthia A., eds. (2005). Gurus in America. SUNY Series in Hindu Studies. Albany, NY: SUNY Press. ISBN 0791465748.
- French, Rebecca Redwood (Spring 1999). "From Yoder to Yoda: Models of Traditional, Modern, and Postmodern Religion in U.S. Constitutional Law". Arizona Law Review. 41 (49).
- Froese, Paul; Uecker, Jeremy E. (September 2022). "Prayer in America: A Detailed Analysis of the Various Dimensions of Prayer". Journal for the Scientific Study of Religion. 61 (3–4): 663–689. doi:10.1111/jssr.12810. ISSN 0021-8294. S2CID 253439298.
- Fulop, Timothy Earl; Raboteau, Albert J., eds. (1997). African American Religion: Interpretive Essays in History and Culture Archived March 7, 2016, at the Wayback Machine. London; New York: Routledge. ISBN 0-415-91458-2.
- Gallagher, Eugene V.; Ashcraft, W. Michael, eds. (2006). Jewish and Christian Traditions. Introduction to New and Alternative Religions in America, 2. Westport, Conn: Greenwood Pub. ISBN 978-0-275-98714-5. LCCN 2006022954. OCLC 315689134.
- Garrett, Leroy (2002). The Stone-Campbell Movement: The Story of the American Restoration Movement. College Press. ISBN 978-0-89900-909-4.
- Garrett, Michael; Garrett, J. T. (2003). Native American Faith in America. Faith in America. J. Gordon Melton, series editor. New York: Facts On File. ISBN 0-8160-4989-0.
- Garvey, John H. (1993). "Fundamentalism and American Law". In Marty, Martin E.; Appleby, R. Scott (eds.). Fundamentalisms and the State: Remaking Polities, Economies, and Militance. The Fundamentalism Project, 3. Chicago, Il; London: University of Chicago Press. pp. 28–49. ISBN 0-226-50883-8.
- Gaustad, Edwin (1962). Historical atlas of religion in America. Harper & Row.
- Gibson, Lynne (2002). Modern World Religions: Hinduism – Pupil Book Core (Modern World Religions). Oxford: Heinemann Educational Pub. ISBN 0-435-33619-3.
- Gill, Sam D. (1982). Native American Religions: An Introduction. Religious Life in History. Belmont, Ca: Wadsworth Pub. Co. ISBN 0-5340-0973-5.
- Gillis, Chester (2012) [2003]. Catholic Faith in America. Faith in America. J. Gordon Melton, series editor (2nd ed.). New York: Chelsea House/Infobase Learning. ISBN 978-1-4381-4034-6.
- Goff, Philip, ed. (2010). The Blackwell Companion to Religion in America. Malden, Ma; Oxford: Wiley-Blackwell. ISBN 978-1-4051-6936-3. (43 essays by scholars)
- Gooren, Henri, ed. (2015). Encyclopedia of Latin American Religions. Springer International Pub. doi:10.1007/978-3-319-08956-0_49-1. ISBN 978-3-319-08956-0. S2CID 239249964.
- Griffiths, Christopher N., ed. (2013). Indian sacred sites: balancing protection issues with federal management. America in the 21st century: political and economic issues. New York: Nova Science Pub. ISBN 978-1628082845.
- Hall, D. D. (2019). The Puritans: A transatlantic history. Princeton, NJ: Princeton University Press.
- Harper, Matthew (2016). The End of Days: African American Religion and Politics in the Age of Emancipation. University of North Carolina Press.
- Harris, Fredrick C. (1999). Something within: Religion in African-American political activism.
- al-Hibri, Azizah; Elshtain, Jean Bethke; Haynes, Charles C. (2001). Religion in American Public Life: Living with Our Deepest Differences. New York: W.W. Norton. ISBN 9780393322064.
- Higginbotham, Evelyn Brooks (1993). Righteous Discontent: The Woman's Movement in the Black Baptist Church, 1880–1920.
- Hill, Samuel S.; Lippy, Charles H.; Wilson, Charles Reagan, eds. (2005). Encyclopedia of Religion in the South.
- Hillerbrand, Hans J., ed. (2014) [2004]. "United States of America". Encyclopedia of Protestantism. Vol. 4 (Reprint ed.). London; New York: Routledge. ISBN 978-0-415-92472-6. Archived from the original on May 23, 2020.
- Hirschfelder, Arlene; Molin, Paulette (2000) [1992]. Encyclopedia of Native American Religions: An Introduction. Foreword by Walter R. Echo-Hawk (Updated ed.). New York: Checkmark Books. ISBN 0-8160-3949-6.
- Hout, Michael (November 2017). "American Religion, All or Nothing at All". Contexts. 16 (4): 78–80. doi:10.1177/1536504217742401. S2CID 67327797.
- Hout, Michael; Fischer, Claude (2014). "Explaining Why More Americans Have No Religious Preference: Political Backlash and Generational Succession, 1987–2012". Sociological Science. 1: 423–447. doi:10.15195/v1.a24. ISSN 2330-6696.
- Hudson, Winthrop Still (1987). Religion in America: An Historical Account of the Development of American Religious Life (4th ed.). New York: Macmillan. ISBN 0-0235-7820-3.
- Hultkrantz, Åke (1987). "North American Indian Religions: An Overview". In Mircea Eliade (ed.). The Encyclopedia of Religion. Vol. 10. New York: Macmillan. ISBN 0-02-909810-6 – via Encyclopedia.com.
- Ingersoll, Julie (2003). Baptist and Methodist Faiths in America. Faith in America. J. Gordon Melton, series editor. New York: Facts On File. ISBN 0-8160-4992-0.
- Jenkins, Philip (2000). Mystics and Messiahs: Cults and New Religions in American History, New York: Oxford University Press.
- Johnson, Paul E., ed. (1994). African-American Christianity: Essays in History.
- Kehoe, Alice Beck (2006) [1989]. The Ghost Dance: Ethnohistory and Revitalization (2nd ed.). Long Grove, Il: Waveland Press. ISBN 1-57766-453-1.
- Keller, Rosemary Skinner; Ruether, Rosemary Radford, eds. (2006). Encyclopedia of Women and Religion in North America. Vol. 1–3.
- Koester, Nancy (2007). Fortress Introduction to the History of Christianity in the United States. Minneapolis, Mn: Fortress Press. ISBN 978-0800632779. (2015 rev. and expand. ed.)
- Kostlevy, William C. (2010). Holy Jumpers: Evangelicals and Radicals in Progressive Era America.
- Landing, James E. (2002). Black Judaism: Story of an American Movement. Durham, NC: Carolina Academic Press. ISBN 978-0-89089-820-8.
- Landis, Benson Young (1965). Religion in the United States. New York: Burnes & Noble.
- Lazerwitz, Bernard Melvin; Winter, J. Alan; Dashefsky, Arnold; Tabory, Ephram (1998). Jewish Choices: American Jewish Denominationalism. SUNY series in American Jewish Society in the 1990s. Albany, NY: SUNY Press. ISBN 978-0-7914-3581-6.
- Lindner, Eileen W., ed. (February 14, 2011). Yearbook of American & Canadian Churches. National Council of Churches. (overview Archived January 19, 2012, at the Wayback Machine)
- Lippy, Charles H., ed. Encyclopedia of the American Religious Experience (3 vol. Scribners, 1988).
- Magid, Shaul (2013). American Post-Judaism: Identity and Renewal in a Postethnic Society. Religion in North America. Bloomington, In: Indiana University Press. ISBN 9780253008022.
- Mandryk, Jason (2010). "United States of America". Operation World: The Definitive Prayer Guide to Every Nation (7th rev. ed.). Downers Grove, Il: InterVarsity Press. ISBN 978-0-8308-5724-1.
- Manseau, Peter (2015). One Nation, Under Gods: A New American History. New York: Little, Brown & Co. ISBN 9780316100038.
- Marsden, George M. (1980). Fundamentalism and American Culture: The Shaping of Twentieth Century Evangelicalism, 1870–1925. Oxford University Press.
- Marty, Martin E. (1986) [1970]. Protestantism in the United States: Righteous Empire (Rev. ed.). New York; London: Charles Scribner's Sons; Collier Macmillan Pub. ISBN 0-02-376500-3.
- Marty, Martin E. (1984). Pilgrims in Their Own Land: 500 Years of Religion in America. New York: Penguin. ISBN 0-14-00-8268-9.
- Marty, Martin E. (1986–1996). Modern American Religion. Chicago, Il: University of Chicago Press. Vol. 1–3.
- Marty, Martin E. (1987). Religion and Republic: The American Circumstance. Boston, Ma: Beacon Press. ISBN 0-8070-1206-8.
- Marty, Martin E. (2004). The Protestant Voice in American Pluralism. Aphens, Ga; London: University of Georgia Press. ISBN 0-8203-2580-5.
- Mauss, Armand L. (1994). The Angel and the Beehive: The Mormon Struggle with Assimilation. Urbana, Il; Chicago: University of Illinois Press. ISBN 0-252-02071-5.
- Melton, J. Gordon (1988). The Encyclopedia of American Religions: Religious Creeds: A Compilation of More Than 450 Creeds, Confessions, Statements of Faith, and Summaries of Doctrine of Religious and Spiritual Groups in the United States and Canada. Vol. 1–2. Detroit, Mi: Gale Research. ISBN 0810321327
- Melton, J. Gordon (1992). Religious Bodies in the U.S.: A Dictionary. Religious Information Systems, 1. New York; London: Garland Publ. ISBN 978-0-8153-0806-5.
- Melton, J. Gordon (1992) [1986]. Encyclopedic Handbook of Cults in America. Religious Information Series, 7 (Rev. and updated ed.). New York; London: Garland Pub. ISBN 0-8153-0502-8.
- Melton, J. Gordon (1999) [1991]. Religious Leaders of America: A Biographical Guide to Founders and Leaders of Religious Bodies, Churches, and Spiritual Groups in North America (2nd ed.). Detroit, Mi: Gale Group. ISBN 0-8103-8878-2.
- Melton, J. Gordon (2000). American Religions: An Illustrated History. Santa Barbara, Ca: ABC-Clio.
- Melton, J. Gordon, ed. (2005). Encyclopedia of Protestantism. Encyclopedia of World Religions. New York: Facts On File. ISBN 0-8160-5456-8.
- Melton, J. Gordon (2007). A Will to Choose: The Origins of African American Methodism. Lanham, Md: Rowman & Littlefield Pub. ISBN 978-0-7425-5264-7.
- Melton, J. Gordon (2012) [2003]. Protestant Faith in America (2nd ed.). New York: Chelsea House/Infobase Learning. ISBN 978-1-4381-4039-1.
- Melton, J. Gordon; et al., eds. (2016) [1978]. Melton's Encyclopedia of American Religions. 2 Volume Set. Vol. 1: United States (9th exp. ed.). Detroit, Mi: Gale Research. ISBN 978-1-4144-0687-9.
- Melton, J. Gordon; Koszegi, Michael A., eds. (1992). Islam in North America: A Sourcebook. New York; London: Garland Pub.
- Miller, Timothy, ed. (1995). America's Alternative Religions. Albany, NY: SUNY Press. ISBN 978-0-7914-2397-4. Archived from the original on July 24, 2020.
- Mittleman, Alan L.; Licht, Robert A.; Sarna, Jonathan D., eds. (2002). Jewish Polity and American Civil Society: Communal Agencies and Religious Movements in the American Public Sphere. Rowman & Littlefield. ISBN 9780742521223.
- Mooney, James (1896). The Ghost Dance Religion and Wounded Knee. New York: Dover Pub.
- Morgan, Douglas (2001). Adventism and the American Republic: The Public Involvement of a Major Apocalyptic Movement. University of Tennessee Press. ISBN 1-57233-111-9.
- Murphy, Larry G.; Melton, J. Gordon; Ward, Gary L., eds. (2011) [1993]. Encyclopedia of African American Religions. Religious Information Systems, 9 (Reprint ed.). New York; London: Routledge. ISBN 978-0-8153-0500-2.
- Neusner, Jacob (1978) [1972]. American Judaism, Adventure in Modernity: An Anthological Essay. New York: KTAV Pub. House. ISBN 0-87068-681-X.
- Neusner, Jacob, ed. (1994). World Religions in America: An Introduction. Louisville, Kentucky: Westminster/John Knox Press. ISBN 0664253008. (2nd rev. ed., 2000. 3rd ed., 2003. 4th ed., 2009.)
- Noll, Mark A., ed. (1983). Eerdmans' handbook to Christianity in America. Grand Rapids, Mi: Wm. B. Eerdmans Pub. ISBN 978-0-8028-3582-6.
- Noll, Mark A. (1988). One Nation Under God: Christian Faith and Political Action in America. HarperCollins. ISBN 9780060663032.
- Noll, Mark A. (2009). The New Shape of World Christianity: How American Experience Reflects Global Faith. InterVarsity Press.
- Noll, Mark A. (2019) [1992]. A History of Christianity in the United States and Canada (2nd updated ed.). Grand Rapids, Mi: Wm. B. Eerdmans Pub. ISBN 978-0-8028-7490-0.
- Olmstead, Clifton E. (1960). A History of Religion in the United States. Englewood Cliffs, NJ: Prentice-Hall.
- Olmstead, Clifton E. (1961). Religion in America Past and Present (5th ed.). Englewood Cliffs, NJ: Prentice-Hall.
- Olson, Roger E.; Mead, Frank S.; Hill, Samuel S.; Atwood, Craig D. (2018) [1951]. Handbook of Denominations in the United States (14th [updated] ed.). Nashville, Tn: Abingdon Press. ISBN 9781501822513.
- Paper, Jordan (2007). Native North American Religious Traditions: Dancing For Life. Westport, Conn; London: Praeger. ISBN 0-2759-9097-4.
- Pasquier, Michael (2023) [2016]. Religion in America: The Basics (2nd ed.). London; New York: Routledge. ISBN 9780367691806.
- Patterson, Eric; Rybarczyk, Edmund (2007). The Future of Pentecostalism in the United States. New York: Lexington Books. ISBN 978-0-7391-2102-3.
- Payne, Wardell J., ed. (1991). Directory of African American Relugious Bodies. Washington, DC: Howard University Press. ISBN 0882581740.
- Pearce, Lisa D.; Gilliland, Claire C. (2020). Religion in America. Sociology in the Twenty-First Century, 6. Oakland, Ca: University of California Press. ISBN 9780520296411.
- Petro, Anthony Michael (2015). After the Wrath of God: AIDS, Sexuality, and American Religion. Oxford University Press. ISBN 978-0-19-939128-8.
- Piepkorn, Arthur Carl (1977). Profiles in Belief: The Religious Bodies of the United States and Canada. New York: Harper & Row. ISBN 978-0-06-066580-7.
- Putnam, Robert D.; Campbell, David E. (2010). American Grace: How Religion Divides and Unites Us.
- Queen, Edward L.; Prothero, Stephen R.; Shattuck, Gardener H. (2009) [1996]. Encyclopedia of American Religious History. Vol. 1–3 (3rd ed.). New York: Facts On File.
- Raboteau, Albert J. (1999). Canaan Land: A Religious History of African Americans. New York: Oxford University Press. ISBN 0-19-514585-2.
- Raboteau, Albert J. (2002). A Sorrowful Joy: A Spiritual Journey of an African-American Man in Late Twentieth-Century America. New York: Paulist Press. ISBN 0-8091-4093-4.
- Raboteau, Albert J. (2016). American Prophets: Seven Religious Radicals and Their Struggle for Social and Political Justice. Princeton, NJ; London: Princeton University Press. ISBN 978-0691164304.
- Raphael, Marc Lee (2003). Judaism in America. New York: Columbia University Press. ISBN 0-231-12060-5.
- Rebhum, Uzi (2016). Jews and the American Religious Landscape. New York: Columbia University Press. ISBN 9780231178266.
- Reid, Daniel G.; Linder, Robert Dean; Shelley, Bruce Leon; Stout, Harry S., eds. (1990). Dictionary of Christianity in America. Downers Grove, Il: InterVarsity Press. ISBN 0-8308-1776-X.
- Robeck, Cecil M. (2006). The Azusa Street Mission and Revival: The Birth of The Global Pentecostal Movement. Thomas Nelson. ISBN 978-0-7852-1693-3.
- Robert, J. Wallis (2003). Shamans/neo-Shamans: Ecstasy, Alternative Archaeologies and Contemporary Pagans. London; New York: Routledge. ISBN 0-415-30203-X.
- Roof, Wade Clark (1999). Spiritual Marketplace: Baby Boomers and the Remaking of American Religion. Princeton, NJ: Princeton University Press. ISBN 1-4008-0672-0.
- Roof, Wade Clark; McKinney, William (1987). American Mainline Religion: Its Changing Shape and Future. New Brunswick, NJ: Rutgers University Press. ISBN 0-8135-1215-8.
- Roozen, David A.; Nieman, James R., eds. (2005). Church, Identity, and Change: Theology and Denominational Structures in Unsettled Times. Grand Rapids, Mi: Wm. B. Eerdmans Pub. ISBN 978-0-8028-2819-4.
- Rosenblum, Nancy L. (2000). Obligations of Citizenship and Demands of Faith: Religious Accommodation in Pluralist Democracies. Princeton, NJ: Princeton University Press.
- Rowe, Henry Kalloch (1924). The History of Religion in the United States. New York: Macmillan.
- Ryan, Charles J. (1975). H.P. Blavatsky and the Theosophical Movement. San Diego, Ca: Point Loma Publications. ISBN 0-913004-25-1.
- Salvatore, Nick (2005). Singing in a Strange Land: C. L. Franklin, the Black Church, and the Transformation of America.
- Sarna, Jonathan D. (2004). American Judaism: A History. New Haven, Conn: Yale University Press. ISBN 978-0-300-10197-3.
- Sarna, Jonathan D., ed. (1998). Minority Faiths and the American Protestant Mainstream. Urbana; Chicago, Il: University of Illinois Press. ISBN 0-252-02293-9.
- Schofield, Charles E., ed. (1933). The Church Looks Ahead: American Protestant Christianity, an Analysis and a Forecast. New York: Macmillan Co. OCLC 02829092.
- Schultz, Kevin M. Tri-Faith America: How Catholics and Jews Held Postwar America to Its Protestant Promise.
- Sensbach, Jon F. (2005). Rebecca's Revival: Creating Black Christianity in the Atlantic World.
- Smith, John Howard (2014). The First Great Awakening: Redefining Religion in British America, 1725–1775. London: Fairleigh Dickinson University Press.
- Smith, R. Drew, ed. (2004). Long March ahead: African American churches and public policy in post-civil rights America.
- Stewart, Omer C. (1987). Peyote Religion: A History. Norman, Ok; London: University of Oklahoma Press. ISBN 978-0-8061-2068-3.
- Tooker, Elisabeth, ed. (1979). Native North American Spirituality of the Eastern Woodlands: sacred myths, dreams, visions, speeches, healing formulas, rituals, and ceremonials. Mahwah, NJ: Paulist Press. ISBN 0-8091-2256-1.
- Underhill, Ruth M. (1965). Red Man's Religion: Beliefs and Practices of the Indians North of Mexico. Chicago, Il; London: University of Chicago Press. ISBN 0-226-84167-7.
- Urban, Hugh B. (2015). New Age, Neopagan, and New Religious Movements: Alternative Spirituality in Contemporary America. Berkeley, Ca: University of California Press. ISBN 978-0-520-28117-2.
- Utter, Jack (2001). American Indians: Answers to Today's Questions (2nd ed.). Norman, Ok; London: University of Oklahoma Press. ISBN 978-0-8061-3313-3.
- Wallace, Anthony F. C. (2010) [1970]. Death and Rebirth of the Seneca. With the assistance of Sheila C. Steen. New York; Toronto: Random House. ISBN 978-0-394-71699-2.
- Wertheimer, Jack (1991). "Recent Trends in American Judaism". In Neusner, Jacob (ed.). An Introduction to Judaism: A Textbook and Reader. Louisville, Kentucky: Westminster/John Knox Press. pp. 85–116. ISBN 0-664-25348-2.
- Wertheimer, Jack, ed. (2002). Jews in the Center: Conservative Synagogues and Their Members. New Brunswick, NJ: Rutgers University Press. ISBN 0-8135-2821-6.
- Wertheimer, Jack (2018). The New American Judaism: How Jews Practice Their Religion Today. Princeton, NJ; Oxford: Princeton University Press. ISBN 978-0-691-18129-5.
- Wigger, John H.; Hatch, Nathan O. (2001). Methodism and the Shaping of American Culture.
- Williams, Peter M. (1989) [1980]. Popular Religion in America: Symbolic Change and the Modernization Process in Historical Perspective (Reprint ed.). Urbana; Chicago, Il: University of Illinois Press. ISBN 0-252-06073-3.
- Williams, Peter W. (2016). Religion, Art, and Money: Episcopalians and American Culture from the Civil War to the Great Depression. Chapel Hill, NC: University of North Carolina Press. ISBN 9781469626987.
- Wills, Daxid W. (2005). Christianity in the United States: A Historical Survey and Interpretation. Notre Dame, In: University of Notre Dame Press.
- Wills, Garry (1990). Under God: Religion and American Politics. ISBN 0-671-65705-4.
- Wills, Garry (2007). Head and Heart: American Christianities. New York: Penguin Press. ISBN 978-1-59420-146-2.
- Willsky-Ciollo, Lydia (2015). American Unitarianism and the Protestant Dilemma: The Conundrum of Biblical Authority. Lanham, Md: Lexington Books. ISBN 9780739188927.
- Wolfe, Alan (2003). The Transformation of American Religion: How We Actually Live Our Faith. New York: Free Press. ISBN 0-7432-2839-1.
- Woodson, Carter G. (1921). The History of the Negro Church. Washington, DC: Associated Pub. hdl:2027/emu.010002643732. OCLC 506124215.
- Zeller, Benjamin E. (2010). Prophets and Protons: New Religious Movements and Science in Late Twentieth-Century America. The New and Alternative Religions Series. New York; London: New York University Press. ISBN 0814797210.
