= Irreligion in the United States =

Religion in the United States by personal self-identification (2023 The Economist/YouGov survey)
1. Protestant (30.0%)
2. Catholic (21.0%)
3. Unaffiliated ("Nothing in particular") (20.0%)
4. Atheist (7.00%)
5. Agnostic (4.00%)
6. Mormon (2.00%)
7. Eastern Orthodox (1.00%)
8. Jewish (2.00%)
9. Muslim (2.00%)
10. Buddhist (1.00%)
11. Other (10.0%)

In the United States, between 6% and 11% of the population demonstrated nonreligious attitudes and naturalistic worldviews, namely atheists or agnostics. Other given answers are: "Nothing in particular", "Agnostics", "Christians", "Jewish", "Buddhists", "Other religions" and "Don't know/Refused". Atheists are between 4% and 7% of American adults. Agnostics make up between 4 and 5% of the adult population.

A growing proportion of people appear to be reporting no religious affiliation on surveys. The percentage of Americans without religious affiliation, often labeled as "Nones", is between 22 and 31%. "No answer" is between 2 and 3%. According to Gallup, the "None" answer to "religious preference" has grown from 2% in 1948 to 22% in 2023. "Other" and "No answer" have been somewhat stable. According to Pew, all three subgroups that together make up the religious "nones" have grown over time: in 2021, atheists were 4% (up from 2% in 2011), 5% agnostics (3% a decade before) and 20% "nothing in particular" (14% ten years before). In 2023, atheists are still 4%. However, an Interdisciplinary Journal of Research on Religion article says atheists were already about 4% around 2008 and that had been the case since at least the 1940s. Most of the increase in the unaffiliated comes from people who had weak or no commitment to religion in the first place, not from people who had a religious commitment. The decrease in strong belief was slower. Still, "Nones" is an unclear category. It is a heterogenous group of the not religious and intermittently religious.

For Robert C. Fuller, there are three types of unchurched: some who are not religious at all ("secular humanists"), those whose relationships with organized religion are ambiguous and those who are religious but unaffiliated with a church. Researchers argue that most of the "Nones" should be considered "unchurched", rather than objectively nonreligious; especially since most "Nones" do hold some religious-spiritual beliefs and a notable amount participate in such behaviors. For example, 72% of American "Nones" believe in God or a higher power and a majority believe in spiritual forces beyond the natural world, and the existence of souls. Even 23% of self-identified atheists believe in a higher power, but not a god as described in the bible. The majority of the "Nones" are not nonbelievers. The "None" response is more of an indicator for lacking affiliation than an active measure for irreligiosity, and a majority of the "Nones" can either be conventionally religious or "spiritual". Americans may be becoming more "spiritual" and less "religious". Some do appear to be spiritual but not religious. Their numbers may be growing.

The 2024 Meaning Making Survey focused on "religiously unaffiliated" respondents and noted that only 19% of this group held atheistic beliefs. In terms of supernatural beliefs, belief in ghosts was held by 36% of agnostics and 26% of atheists, belief in reincarnation was held by 24% of agnostics and 20% of atheists, belief in an afterlife was held by 25% of agnostics and 15% of atheists.

Social scientists observe that nonreligious Americans are characterized by indifference. Very few incorporate active irreligion as part of their identity, and only about 1-2% join groups promoting such values. Nonetheless, secular congregations have emerged. Secular Americans are complex and not always devoid of religious or spiritual things.

== Demographics ==
At the beginning of the 21st century, about one in every seven Americans was completely indifferent to religion. Between 38 to 40 percent of the adult population in the United States had no formal religious affiliation. Nearly 20% of all Americans considered themselves interested in spiritual issues.

A 2007 Barna group poll found that about 20 million people say they are atheist, have no religious faith, or are agnostic, with 5 million of that number claiming to be atheists. The study also found that "[t]hey tend to be more educated, more affluent and more likely to be male and unmarried than those with active faith" and that "only 6 percent of people over 60 have no faith in God, and one in four adults ages 18 to 22 describe themselves as having no faith."

In the 2008 American Religious Identification Survey (ARIS) report, 15% of the US population identified as having "no religion", almost double the 1990 figure.

Irreligiosity is often under-reported in American surveys; many more express lack of faith in God or have alternative views on God (e.g. deism), than those who self-identify as atheists, agnostics and the like. In 2012, 23% of religious affiliates did not consider themselves to be "religious", though this is subjective. The number of atheists and agnostics found in common surveys tends to be quite low since, for instance, according to the 2019 Pew survey they were 4 and 5% respectively and according to the 2014 General Social Survey they were 4% and 5% respectively. In a 2007 Pew Forum U.S. Religious Landscape Survey, self-identification and actual views on God differed: out of all the adults who did not believe in God or a universal spirit, 24% self-identified as "Atheists". The others answered: "Nothing in particular" (35%), "Agnostics" (15%), one of five Christian choices (14%), "Jewish" (4%), "Buddhists" (3%), "Other religions" (4%) and "Don't know/Refused" (2%). In one 2018 research paper using indirect probabilistic methods with considerable uncertainty estimated that 26% of Americans are atheists, which is much higher than the 3%-11% rates that are consistently found in surveys.

A 2012 study by Pew reported that, of the U.S. adult population, 19.6% had no religious affiliation and an additional 16% identified as "neither spiritual nor religious". Furthermore, atheists made up 2.4% and agnostics made up 3.3% of the US population. It also notes that a third of adults under the age of 30 are religiously unaffiliated. However, out of the religiously unaffiliated demographic: the majority describe themselves either as a religious (18%) or as spiritual but not religious (37%) while a significant minority (42%) considers themselves neither spiritual nor religious. Additionally, out of the unaffiliated: 68% believe in God, 12% are atheists, 17% are agnostics and overall 21% of the religiously unaffiliated pray every day.

The Pew Religious Landscape survey reported that as of 2014, 22.8% of the U.S. population is religiously unaffiliated, atheists made up 3.1% and agnostics made up 4% of the U.S. population. Out of all Americans who identify as unaffiliated including atheists and agnostics, 41% were raised Protestant and 28% were raised Catholic according to the 2014 Pew Religious Landscape survey. The 2022 General Social Survey found that of Americans with no religion, 40% were raised Protestant and 25% were raised Catholic. A 2023 PRRI survey found that 51% of unaffiliated Americans were formerly Protestant while 35% were formerly Catholic.

The 2014 General Social Survey reported that 21% of Americans had no religion with 3% being atheist and 5% being agnostic.

Some 20% of Americans considered themselves neither religious nor spiritual. Irreligiousness is highest among young, white, unmarried, educated males.

When asked, around a third (24%-34% in different years) answered they were "not religious", and another 8% as atheist. Many of these identify/affiliate themselves with established religious groups and most believe in God. In one survey, 88% considered themselves as at least moderately spiritual.

According to the 2014 General Social Survey the percentages of the US population that identified as no religion were 21% in 2014, 20% in 2012, just 14% in 2000, and only 8 percent in 1990. Furthermore, the number of atheists and agnostics in the US has remained relatively flat in the past 23 years since in 1991 only 2% identified as atheist and 4% identified as agnostic while in 2014 only 3% identified as atheist and 5% identified as agnostic.

According to the 2008 Pew Religious Landscape report, as 2007, 16.1% of the US population identified as "no religion", atheists made up 1.6% and agnostics made up 2.4% of the US population.

According to a 2012 Pew Report on the "Nones", 19.6% of the population identified as "no religion", atheists made up 2.4% and agnostics made up 3.3% of the US population.

The Pew Religious Landscape survey reported that as of 2014, 22.8% of the American population is religiously unaffiliated, atheists made up 3.1% and agnostics made up 4% of the US population.

A 2010 Pew Research Center study comparing Millennials to other generations showed that of those between 18 and 29 years old, only 3% self-identified as "atheists" and only 4% as "agnostics". Overall, 25% of Millennials were "Nones" and 74% were religiously affiliated. Though Millennials are less religious than previous generations at the same age frame, they are also much less engaged in many social institutions in general than previous generations.

According to the American Values Atlas from PPRI, 24% of the US Population was unaffiliated with a religion in 2017.

According to the Cooperative Congressional Election Study, 31% were "nones" in 2016 and 29.5% were "nones" in 2018.

According to a Pew study, 7% of those raised Protestant are now unaffiliated whereas 4% of those raised Catholic are now unaffiliated.

In 2019, a Pew study found that 65% of American adults described themselves as Christians while the religiously unaffiliated, including atheist, agnostic or "nothing in particular", is 26%.

According to a 2018 Pew report, 72% of the "Nones" have belief in God, a higher power, or spiritual force. A 2024 Pew survey found that 28% of Americans are unaffiliated. Estimates of the population with no religion range to almost a hundred million.

Several groups promoting irreligion – including the Freedom From Religion Foundation, American Atheists, Camp Quest, and the Rational Response Squad – have witnessed large increases in membership numbers in recent years, and the number of nonreligious student organizations at American colleges and universities increased during the 2000s (decade). However, the growth of atheist groups is very limited and will possibly shrink due to atheists normally being non-joiners. The overwhelming majority of the nonreligious in the US do not express their convictions in any manner, and only a negligible percentage joins irreligious organizations. As such, the overwhelming majority on the nonreligious do not join secular groups. Only a very small minority of the nonreligious, around 1% to 2%, actually join these kinds of groups.

== Various explanations for trends ==
Some of the underlying factors in the increases in people identifying as "Nones" seem to not be that significant numbers of people are dropping religion, but rather that, in recent times, it has become more socially acceptable for younger and older generations to identify as a "None" than in previous decades, when identifying as having no religion carried negative stigmas. With young people usually having lower religious observance than older people and them feeling more comfortable identifying as a "None", generational replacement factors could play a role in the increment.

Other possible driving factors may be just broader general cultural changes in the American way of life. The growth of the internet and social media has altered the sense of community and spirituality and the growth of self-focused citizenry, as opposed to community-focused citizenry, has broadly led to less civic involvement and less loyalty to many public institutions.

Other possible driving forces could be political backlash. Young adults, in particular, have turned away from organized religion because they perceive it as deeply entangled with conservative politics and some seek to distance themselves from polarized systems.

Others have suggested that delays in marriage, settling down, and having children among younger people reduces or delays the number and commitment of people participating in traditional religions or religious activities.

Robert Fuller argues that the ascendency of science as a way of understanding the world makes it difficult for some people to believe in the supernatural or accept the "blind faith" that religion often requires. Additionally, modern biblical scholarship has illuminated the human authorship of the Bible as opposed to divine revelation, and most educated people are aware of the role that cultural conditioning plays in shaping beliefs and attitudes.

Younger generations as a whole have lost trust and belief in numerous institutions along with religion. For instance, Millennials, which make up about 1/3 the "Nones" demographic, tend to have less belief and trust in institutions such as the labor market, the economy, government and politics, marriage, the media, along with churches; than previous generations. The Nones tend to be more politically liberal and their growth has resulted in some increases in membership of secular organizations. However, the overwhelming majority of those without religion are not joining secular groups or even aligning with secularism.

Secular people in the United States, such as atheist and agnostics, have a distinctive belief system that can be traced for at least hundreds of years. They sometimes create religion-like institutions and communities, create rituals, and debate aspects of their shared beliefs. For these reasons, they are surprisingly religion-like despite often being opposed to religion.

== Tables ==
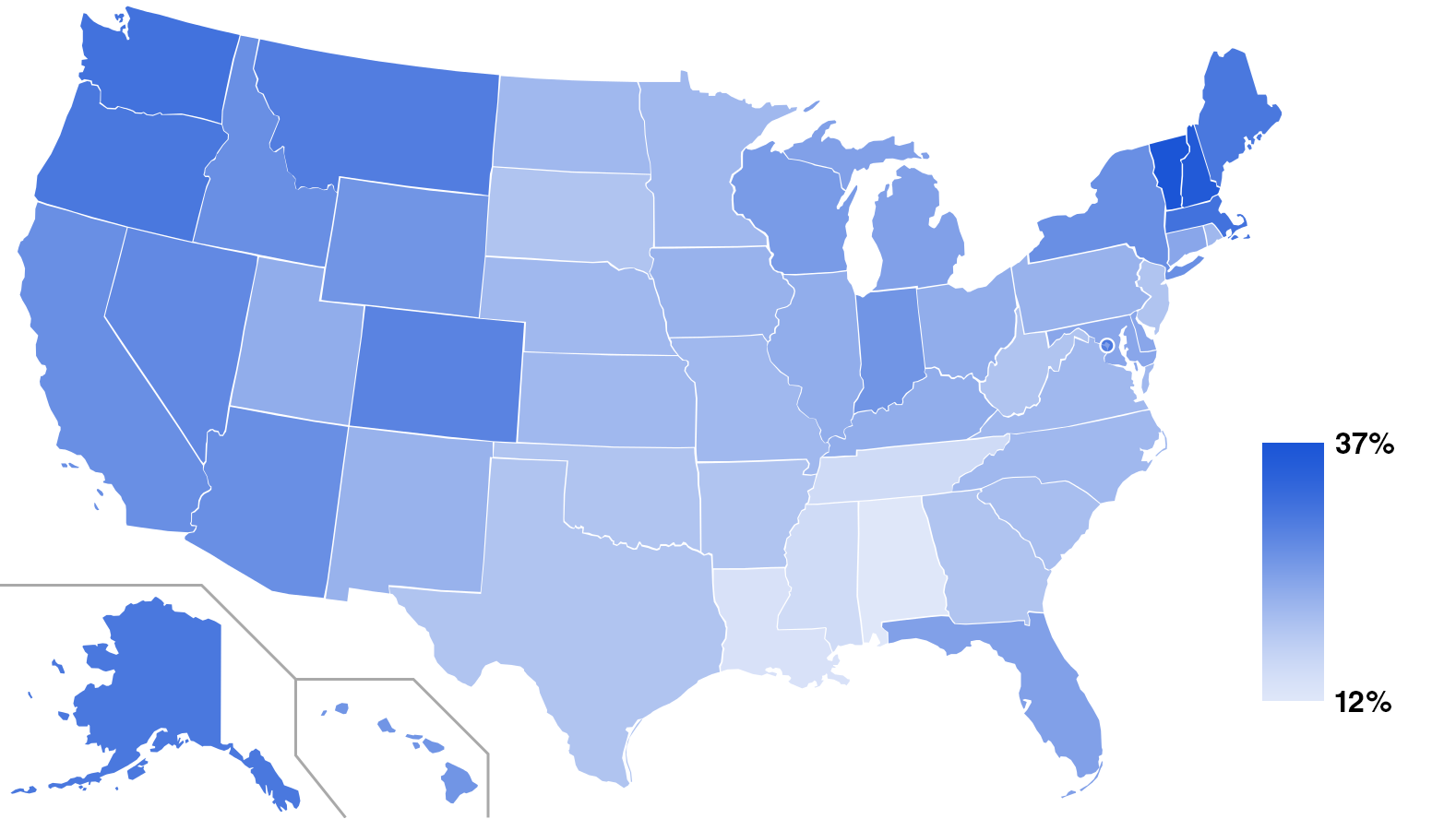
"Nones" by US state (2014)

Analyzing the 2014 map on the right, New England and the Western United States have the highest proportions of irreligious Americans, while the South and Great Plains have the lowest proportions.

=== Various beliefs ===
Various beliefs and practices of the "Nones" in 2012.

Traits	% Nones (2012)
Believe in God	68%
Consider themselves religious	18%
Consider themselves spiritual but not religious	37%
Consider themselves as neither spiritual nor religious	42%
Pray every day	21%
Pray once a month	21%

=== "Nones" by state ===
Rank	Jurisdiction	% "Nones" (2007)	% "Nones" (2014)
–	United States	16%	23%
01	Vermont	34%	37%
02	New Hampshire	29%	36%
03	Washington	23%	32%
04	Massachusetts	20%	32%
05	Alaska	27%	31%
06	Maine	25%	31%
07	Oregon	27%	31%
08	Montana	21%	30%
09	Colorado	25%	29%
10	Nevada	21%	28%
11	Idaho	18%	27%
12	California	21%	27%
13	Arizona	22%	27%
14	New York	17%	27%
15	Wyoming	28%	26%
16	Hawaii	18%	26%
17	Indiana	16%	26%
18	Wisconsin	16%	25%
19	District of Columbia	18%	24%
20	Michigan	17%	24%
21	Florida	16%	24%
22	Delaware	19%	23%
23	Connecticut	20%	23%
24	Maryland	16%	23%
25	Ohio	17%	22%
26	Utah	16%	22%
27	Illinois	15%	22%
28	Kentucky	12%	22%
29	New Mexico	21%	21%
30	Iowa	15%	21%
31	Pennsylvania	13%	21%
32	Rhode Island	23%	20%
33	Nebraska	16%	20%
34	Virginia	18%	20%
35	Missouri	16%	20%
36	Minnesota	13%	20%
37	Kansas	14%	20%
38	North Carolina	12%	20%
39	North Dakota	11%	20%
40	South Carolina	10%	19%
41	New Jersey	12%	18%
42	West Virginia	19%	18%
43	South Dakota	12%	18%
44	Texas	12%	18%
45	Oklahoma	12%	18%
46	(Georgia (U.S. state)) Georgia	13%	18%
47	Arkansas	13%	18%
48	Tennessee	12%	14%
49	Mississippi	6%	14%
50	Louisiana	8%	13%
51	Alabama	8%	12%

=== "Nones" by territory ===
Territories of the United States with percentage of population claiming no religion in 2010.

Territories	% Nones (2010)
U.S. Virgin Islands	3.8% or 3.7%
Puerto Rico	1.9%
Guam	1.7%
Northern Mariana Islands	1%
American Samoa	0.7%

=== "Nones" by region ===
A region of the western United States known as the "Unchurched Belt" is traditionally considered to contain the highest concentration of irreligious people, although this may have been surpassed by New England.

Regions of the United States ranked by percentage of population claiming no religion in 2014.

Region	% Nones (2014)
West	28%
Northeast	25%
Midwest	22%
South	19%

=== "None" demographics ===
Demographics of the religiously unaffiliated in 2012 (as fraction of the named groups).

Race	% Unaffiliated
White	20%
Hispanic	16%
Black	15%

Gender	% Unaffiliated
Men	23%
Women	17%

Generation (years of birth)	% Unaffiliated
Younger Millennials (1990–1994)	34%
Older Millennials (1981–1989)	30%
GenXers (1965–1980)	21%
Boomers (1946–1964)	15%
Silent (1928–1945)	9%
Greatest (1913–1927)	5%

== Politics ==
In the late 2010s, 21% of registered voters were religiously unaffiliated; they are considered to be the largest "religious" voting block.

More than six-in-ten religiously unaffiliated registered voters are Democrats (39%) or lean toward the Democratic Party (24%). They are about twice as likely to describe themselves as political liberals than as conservatives, and solid majorities support legal abortion (72%) and same-sex marriage (73%). In the last five years, the unaffiliated have risen from 17% to 24% of all registered voters who are Democrats or lean Democratic. According to a Pew Research exit poll 70% of those who were religiously unaffiliated voted for Barack Obama.

In January 2007, California Congressman Pete Stark became the first openly atheist member of Congress. In January 2013, Kyrsten Sinema became the first openly non-theist Congresswoman, representing the state of Arizona. The Congressional Freethought Caucus was founded in 2018 to defend the secular character of government.

== See also ==
- Discrimination against atheists in the United States
- Exvangelical
- First Amendment to the United States Constitution
- Religion in the United States § Agnosticism, atheism, and humanism

== Bibliography ==
- Richard Dawkins, "Secularism, the Founding Fathers and the religion of America", in The God Delusion, Black Swan, 2007 (ISBN 978-0-552-77429-1).
