= Texas rice production =

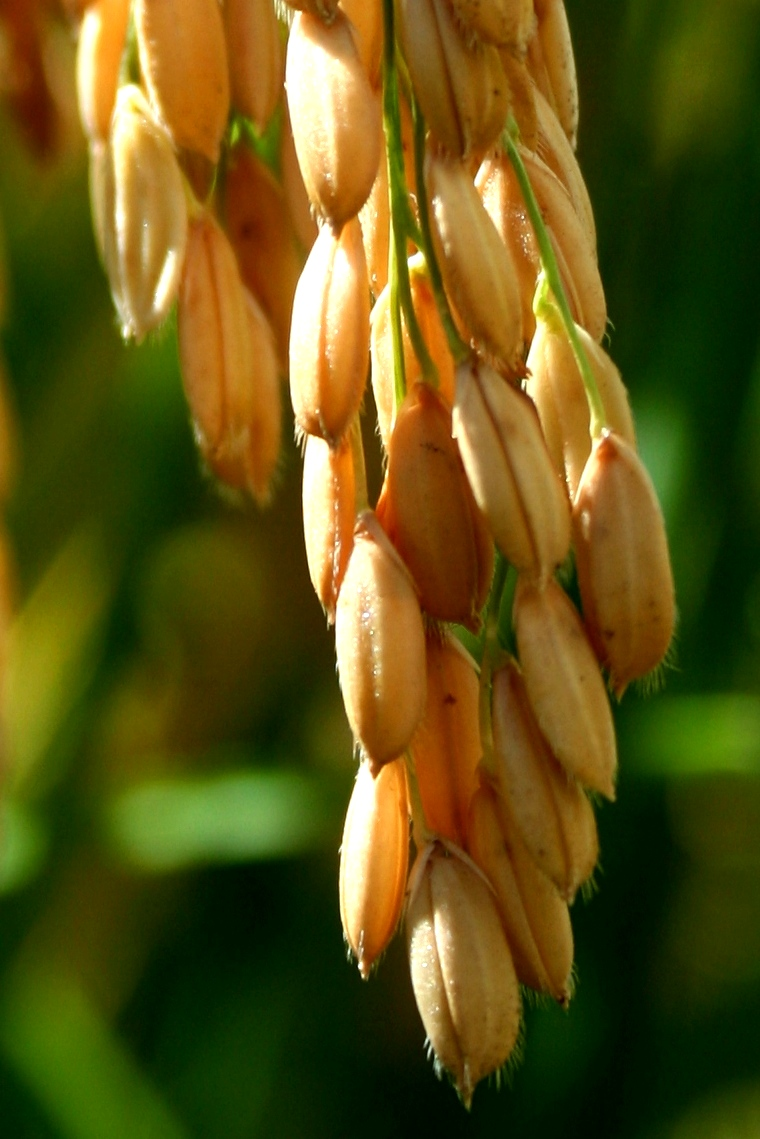
Grains of rice

Rice production in Texas began in 1853 in southeast Texas. By 1903, the acres of cultivated rice in Texas was second only to Louisiana and together accounted for 99 percent of rice production in United States. While other states have surpassed Texas in rice production, it remains a significant Texas crop into the foreseeable future.

== Early cultivation ==
The first large acreage cultivation of rice in Texas was in 1853 by William Goyens. David French was growing in such quantity by 1863 that he is considered to be the first to operate a major rice farm in Beaumont, Texas. By the 1880s, commercial rice production spread from southwest Louisiana and into southeast Texas. Transportation infrastructure fostered the growth of modern commercial rice production in Texas, primarily due to the full operation of the southern transcontinental railroad and its acquisition two years later by the Southern Pacific Railroad. Furthermore, readily available land at cheap prices and the construction of modern rice mills provided further encouragement for rice growing. Pumps and irrigation systems provided further means of expanded production as farmers cultivated rice by using water from the Colorado River, four decades before the chain of Texas Highland Lakes were created beginning in 1938.

== Twentieth-century cultivation ==
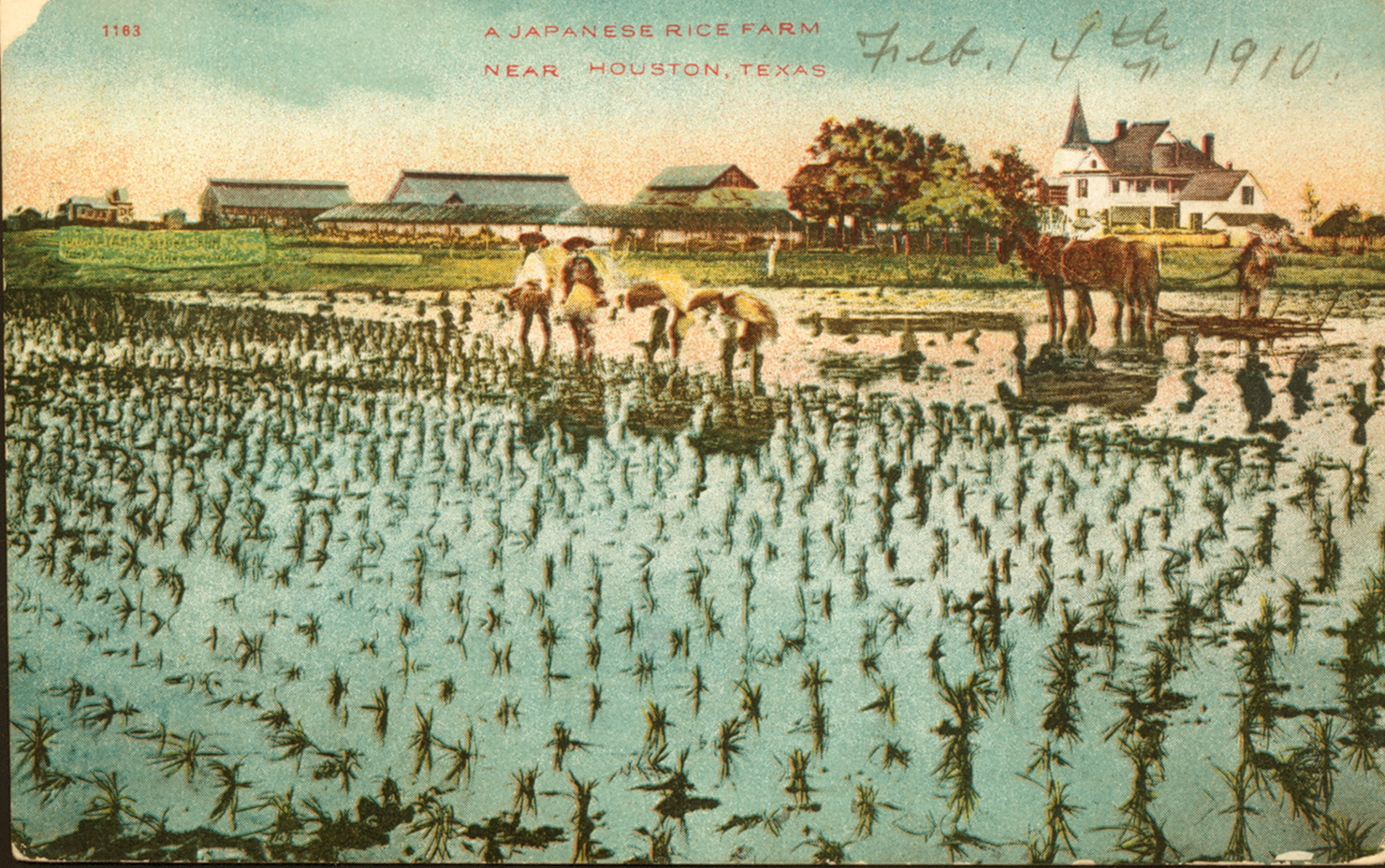
Postcard depicting a rice farm near Houston, 1910

By 1903, Texas cultivated 234,000 acres of rice. This was second to only Louisiana in rice cultivation which produced 376,000 acres of this crop. At this point, the two states accounted for 99 percent of the rice grown in the United States. Farmers in Arkansas, during 1904, began that state's moved toward major efforts in rice growing. California followed suit in 1912. Arkansas and California eventually became the two largest growers of rice in the nation.

Texas rice industry on the Gulf Coast was originally established in 1904 when seed was imported from Japan. Japanese farmers were invited to the region by the Southern Pacific Railroad and the Houston Chamber of Commerce. There they acted as consultants, advising the local farmers on rice cultivation. Seito Saibara, accompanied by his family and thirty Japanese colonists, oversaw the rice production which originated in Harris County at Webster. Their influence was such that the Saibara family was eventually credited with establishing the rice industry on the Texas Gulf Coast. In the first three years, the harvest averaged 34 barrels per acre of rice from Japanese seed, surpassing the average of 18 to 20 barrels per acre produced from the typical Texas seed.

World War I and the Great Depression resulted in a collapse of rice prices and brought hardship to Texas rice farmers. This resulted in the New Deal program, the Agricultural Adjustment Act which established price and production controls which still influence the rice industry today. Like other rice producing states, Texas rice farming depends on international markets. This along with increased rice consumption by the American public and an opening in new overseas markets indicate that the Texas rice market should remain strong into the foreseeable future.

== See also ==
- Rice Belt
- Rice production in the United States
- Rice cultivation in Arkansas
