= List of belt regions of the United States =

List of portions of the U.S. that share certain characteristics

The belt regions of the United States are portions of the country that share certain characteristics. The "belt" terminology was first applied to growing regions for various crops, which often follow lines of latitude because those are more likely to have similar climates. The allusion was to a long clothing belt, as seen on a map.

The usage has expanded to other climatic, economic, and cultural concentrations. These regions are not formally defined; they frequently overlap and have vague borders. The terminology is also used outside the U.S. (e.g. India's Hindi Belt).

== List of regions ==
- Banana belt, a term applied to several U.S. areas with milder climates than their surrounding regions
- Bible Belt, any collection of states more specifically in the American South where evangelical and fundamentalist Protestantism are prevalent
- Black Belt in the American South, the social history and politics, especially concerning slavery and black workers, of the geological region known as the Black Belt
- Black Belt (region of Alabama), a section of Alabama (and extending into Mississippi) having a particular concentration of African Americans
- Borscht Belt, a region of Jewish resorts in the Catskill Mountains
- Corn Belt, midwestern and southern states where corn is the primary crop
- Cotton Belt, southern states where cotton is or was a primary crop
- Fruit Belt, an area where fruit growing is prominent, specially oranges at the state of Florida and grapes at California
- Indiana Gas Belt, a region of Indiana that was the site of a natural gas boom in the late 19th century and early 20th century
- Jell-O Belt, also known as the Mormon corridor or Book of Mormon belt, western states with a large Mormon population
- Lead Belt, a district in southeastern Missouri that has a long history of mining for lead
- Pine Belt, a region of southern Mississippi where longleaf pine trees are abundant
- Pretzel Belt, a district of Pennsylvania associated with numerous regional and nationally distributed pretzel and snack food producers
- Rice Belt, southern states where rice is a major crop
- Rust Belt (in the past, commonly known as the Manufacturing Belt, Factory Belt, or Steel Belt), northeastern and central northern states where heavy industrialization—and some economic stagnation—is common
- Salt Belt, a region in the northeast and midwest states where large quantities of salt are applied to control snow and ice on roads during the winter season
- Snow Belt, areas around the Great Lakes prone to lake-effect snow and cold weather
- Stroke Belt, a region in the Southeast that has an unusually high incidence of stroke and other forms of cardiovascular disease
- Sun Belt, southern, hot-weather states stretching from coast to coast
- Unchurched Belt, a region in the far Northwestern United States that has low religious attendance
- Wheat Belt, northern midwestern states where most of North America's grain and soybeans are grown (cf. Breadbasket)

== Belt region by state ==
Name	Description	State																																																	
Name	Description	AL	AK	AZ	AR	CA	CO	CT	DE	FL	GA	HI	ID	IL	IN	IA	KS	KY	LA	ME	MD	MA	MI	MN	MS	MO	MT	NE	NV	NH	NJ	NM	NY	NC	ND	OH	OK	OR	PA	RI	SC	SD	TN	TX	UT	VT	VA	WA	WV	WI	WY
Corn Belt	Midwestern and southern states where corn is the primary crop													X	X	X	X	X						X	X	X		X							X	X						X								X	
Cotton Belt	Southern states where cotton is or was a primary crop	X			X						X								X						X									X			X				X		X	X							
Frost Belt/ Snow Belt	A region of cold weather in the north-central United States														X								X										X			X			X											X	
Rice Belt	Southern states where rice is a major crop				X														X						X																			X							
Rust Belt	Northeastern and central northern states where heavy industrialization—and some economic stagnation—is common													X	X						X		X								X		X			X			X											X	

== See also ==
- List of regions of the United States
