= Cotton Belt =

Cultural region of the United States

Coordinates: 32°N 83°W

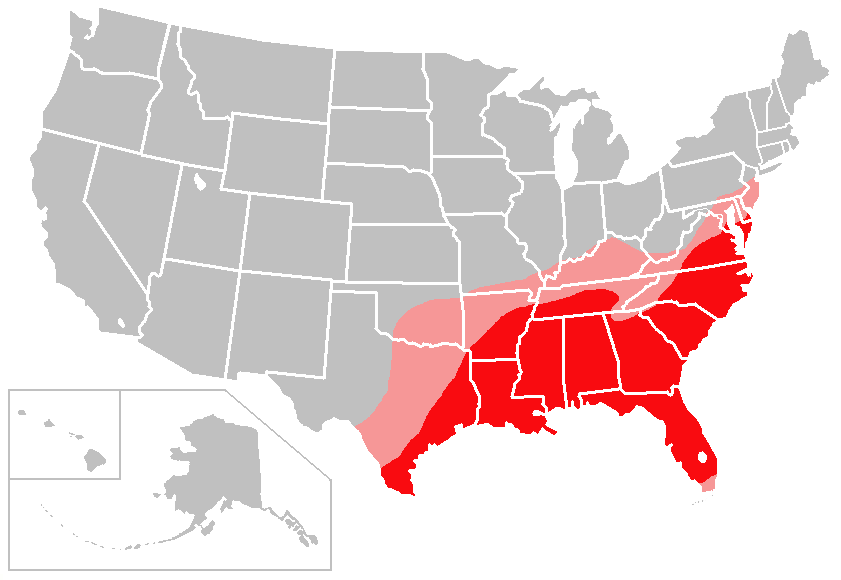
The Cotton Belt region in dark red, with cotton growing areas in pink

The Cotton Belt is a region of the Southern United States where cotton was the predominant cash crop from the late 19th century into the 20th century.

Before the invention of the cotton gin in 1793, cotton production was limited to coastal plain areas of North Carolina, South Carolina and Georgia, and, on a smaller scale, along the lower Mississippi River. The cotton gin allowed profitable processing of short-staple cotton, which could be grown in the upland regions of the Deep South. After 1793 the Natchez District rapidly became the leading cotton-producing region in Mississippi. Natchez planters developed new cotton plant hybrids and a mechanized system that fueled the spread of the cotton plantation system throughout the Old Southeast. The demand by European Americans for land to develop for upland cotton drove the removal of Native American tribes from the Southeast after 1830. The central part of this area, extending into Texas, became known as the Black Belt due to the color of the fertile soil and later the high proportion of slave population.

By the middle of the 19th century, the Cotton Belt extended from Southeast Virginia to East Texas. The most intensive cotton production occurred in Georgia, Tennessee, Alabama, Arkansas, and Mississippi, together with parts of Florida, Louisiana, and Texas. High productivity depended on the plantation system and slavery combined with fertile soils and a favorable climate.

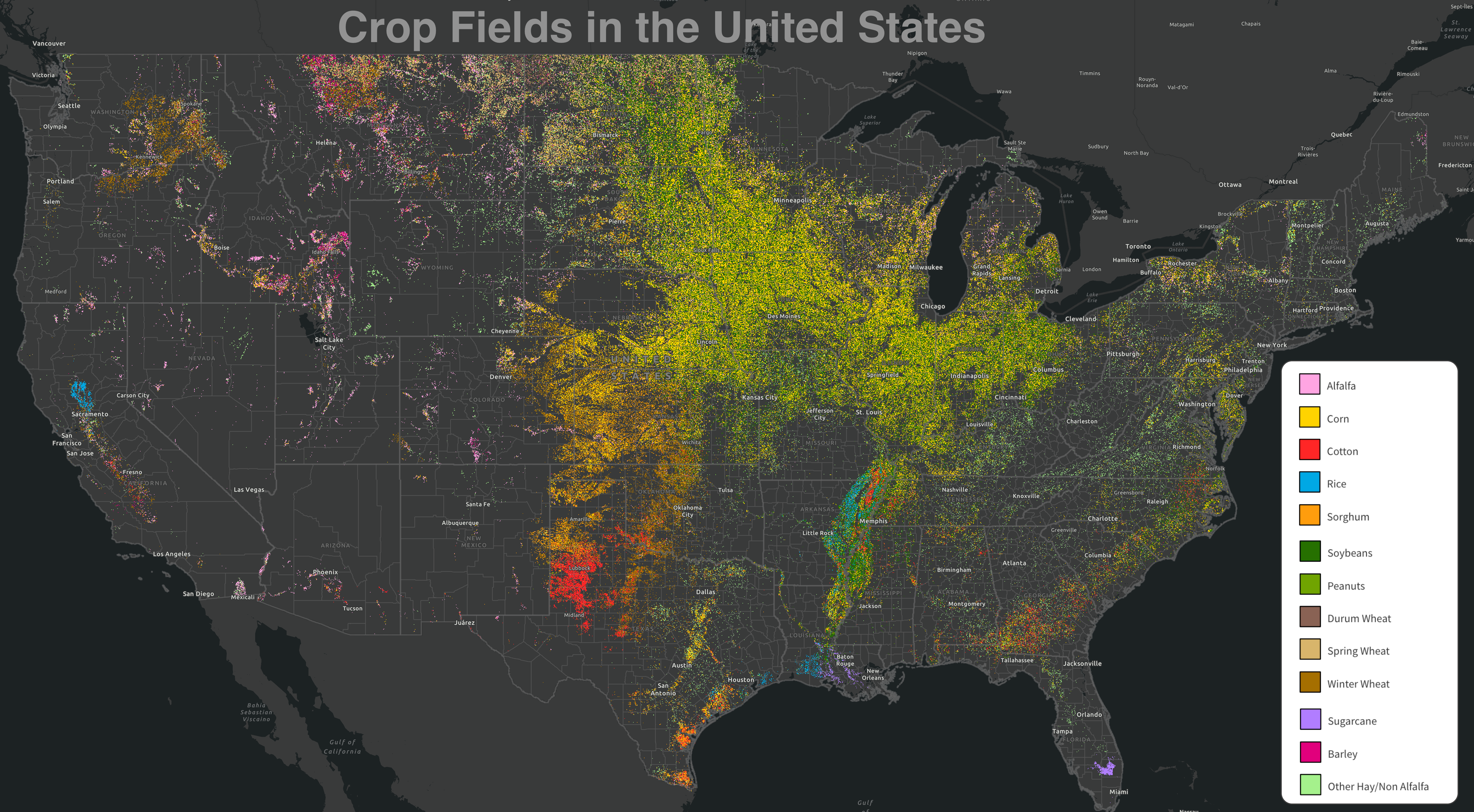
Crop fields in the United States in 2024

After the Civil War and the abolition of slavery, many freedman families worked as sharecroppers rather than hire out as laborers; this generally replaced slavery as the primary source of agricultural labor. Cotton production in the region declined in the 20th century due to soil depletion, invasion by the boll weevil, development of alternative markets, and social changes in the region as urban, industrial areas developed. Cotton is still grown in parts of the region, but agricultural land in the region is now used primarily for other commodity crops such as corn, wheat, soybeans, and livestock; and commercial timber production.

== See also ==
- Deep South
- List of belt regions of the United States
