= Rice cultivation in Arkansas =

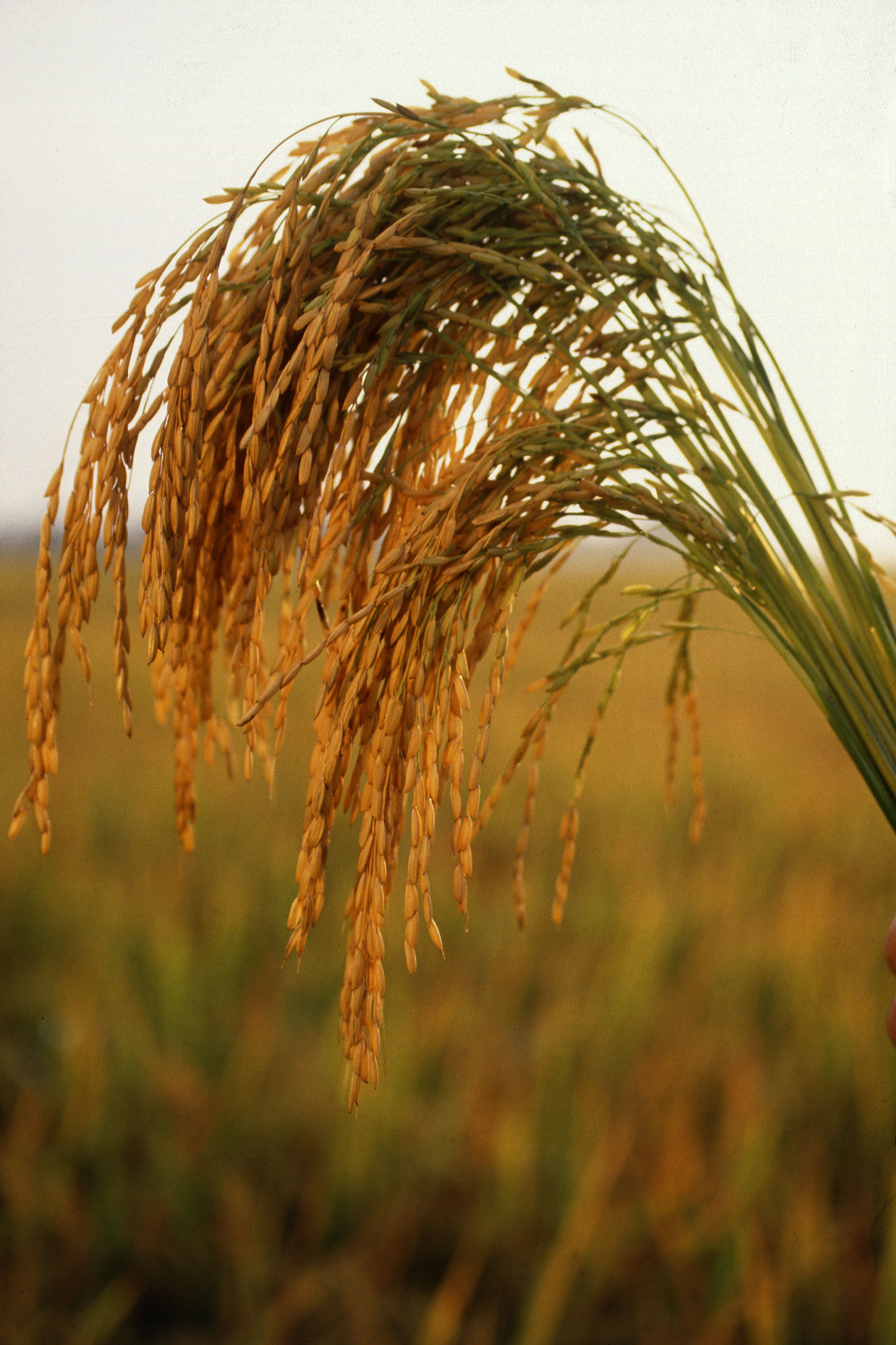
Long grain American rice variety, USDA Agricultural Research Service Photo Library

Large scale rice production in the state of Arkansas became a significant industry in the late 19th/early 20th century with its wide scale propagation within the state by entrepreneur W.H. Fuller around 1896. Arkansas has historically been the largest rice producer in the entire United States, and accounted for nearly 45% of U.S. rice production in 2001, as well as just less than half of the total number of acres of rice harvested nationwide. Much of Arkansas' rice is grown in the east-central portion of the state, where it requires nearly three times the amount of irrigation water than the average eleven inches the region receives during the growing season. In the areas of lowest precipitation, or where weedy red rice is a significant problem, farmers follow a three year, three phase "old rotation" of rice-soybean-soybean. However, most Arkansas rice producers follow a two year, two phase crop rotation of rice following soybeans.

== History ==
The origins of rice cultivation within the state of Arkansas, as well as within the entire Grand Prairie region, is typically attributed to Nebraskan entrepreneur W.H. Fuller's move to Lonoke County, Arkansas and subsequent planting of rice throughout the region. The idea to plant rice in Arkansas came to Fuller in August 1896, when he was travelling to Louisiana with companion Hewit Puryear for a hunting trip. Along their horse and wagon trip, the two men were especially captivated by a rice field in the southern Louisiana town of Crowley. It was in front of these fields that Fuller realized "...we had a good rice country if we had the water. At that time there were no wells [near Crowley] but they were talking of making wells, which gave me the idea of wells here." Fuller was initially successful, but later realized that he had yet to master the techniques of rice cultivation, and so in 1898 embarked with fellow Nebraskan farmer John Morris back to Louisiana to perfect these techniques. Fuller returned to Arkansas in 1903 a master of rice farming, sowing acres of it in 1904, from which he harvested over 5,000 bushels.

== Economics ==
The annual Arkansas rice crop is crucially integral to the state's economy, contributing more than $6 billion to the state's economy every year and accounts for over 25,000 jobs. Being such a large system with many interrelated factors, the factors that impact the profitability of Arkansas rice are diverse and numerous. For example, the Arkansas rice producers' profit margins are directly impacted by domestic farm prices, which are in turn firmly connected to global market prices. Along with this, government payments also directly impact Arkansas farm revenues, and in turn the quality of the crop/its profitability due to the programs and methods the government encourages (such as crop mixing as a way to manage risk). Economic return of rice crops within Arkansas vary markedly depending on variety cultivated, methods of crop rotation, region of the state it is grown in, methods of cultivation, etc. For example, "continuous rice produced the largest gross returns [from 2000-2001] per hectare on average, ranging from $936.94 ha^{−1} to $1195.83 ha^{−1}," whereas "the rice-corn rotation produced the smallest gross returns on average," only yielding $749.24 ha^{−1} to $1003.79 ha^{−1}.

== Geography ==
Rice production by county in the United States, showing majority of production is within Eastern Arkansas

Of all the rice producing states, Arkansas continues to be the largest in terms of acres of rice planted as well as production. In 2003, Arkansas had 1,466,600 acres planted with rice. California and Louisiana, the two states runner up to Arkansas in these categories, had only 509,000 and 455,000 acres of rice under cultivation in the same year, respectively. The five largest rice-producing counties in the state of Arkansas were Poinsett (134,944 harvested acreage), Arkansas (117,675 harvested acreage), Cross (106,254 harvested acreage), Jackson (101,762 harvested acreage), and Lawrence (99,480 harvested acreage) in the year 2003, which represented nearly 36% of the state's total land acreage under rice production.

== Methods ==
=== Technology (irrigation, tractors, etc.) ===
Rice is an extremely water intensive crop, and as a result requires quite a bit of irrigation "that must be secured from other sources." However, Arkansas rice growers have adopted water saving irrigation practices where natural slopes and soil depths can be utilized in order to retain water. One such method that is being adopted more and more by rice farmers in Arkansas is straight-levee rice cultivation. Other common methods of irrigation include flood/levees, of which 1,089,036 acres of rice (74.9% of total acreage) were irrigated with in the year 2003, as well as flood/multiple inlets, of which 361,168 (24.8% of total acreage) acres were irrigated with in the same year.

=== Preparation/Seeding ===
Arkansas rice is typically grown in drilled rows, which are flooded at the four to six leaf stage (usually four to five weeks after planting), under a dry seeded culture. Many Arkansas rice farmers still rely on conventional tillage methods for planting their rice, such as farmer Dow Brantley of England, Arkansas who reported in 2005 that he "still plants about 20 percent of his 1,200 acre rice crop in conventional tillage methods." Planting the majority of his rice with no till methods, Brantley has found that "reduced till rice...advantages include: lower production costs, more profit per acre, less labor demand (the same labor handles more acres), less wear on equipment, more residue (that helps with more cotton), and less red rice pressure, especially with continuous rice."

=== Fertilization ===
As with many issues pertinent to rice farming in Arkansas, the rates and methods of fertilization vary depending on a number of factors. Nitrogen fertilization, as with many crops grown in the United States, often plays a significant role in the growth of rice within Arkansas. The University of Arkansas Division of Agriculture (U.A.D.A.) suggests different amounts of Nitrogen addition to soil depending on such factors as soil type, rice variety being grown, crop rotation, etc. For example, the U.A.D.A. recommends 150 lb. N/acre ("this recommendation is for N applied in a 2 or 3-way split application where 90 lb N/acre is applied preflood and followed by 60 lb N/acre at midseason") for Wells rice grown in rotation with soybeans on silt/sandy-loam soils. However, a simple change in soil texture from silt/sandy-loam soil to a clay soil induces a 30 lb per acre increase in the recommended amount of nitrogen to be added to the soil.

== Varieties ==
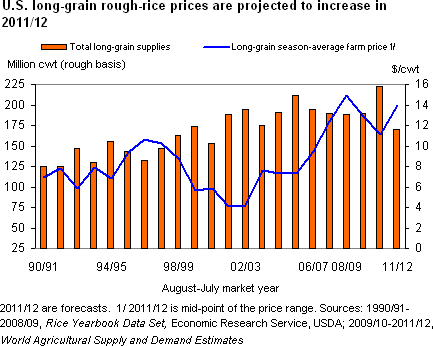
USDA Economic Research Service

The most prominent varieties of rice planted within Arkansas, with their respective percentages of acreage occupied of total area under rice cultivation are: Wells (45.2%), Cocodrie (21.8%), Bengal (11.2%), Francis (6.3%), CL 161 (4.7%), and LaGrue (2.6%). Wells, the most prominent variety of rice grown in Arkansas, is a long grain rice actually developed by the University of Arkansas Agricultural Experiment Station in February 1999 in order to increase yields of the crop. Though the long grained Wells variety essentially dominates the rice fields of Arkansas, "Bengal is a successful southern medium-grain released in 1993 and is still the leading medium-grain variety grown in Arkansas."

Yamada Nishiki is a specialty variety cultivated for sake production.

== Weeds/pests ==
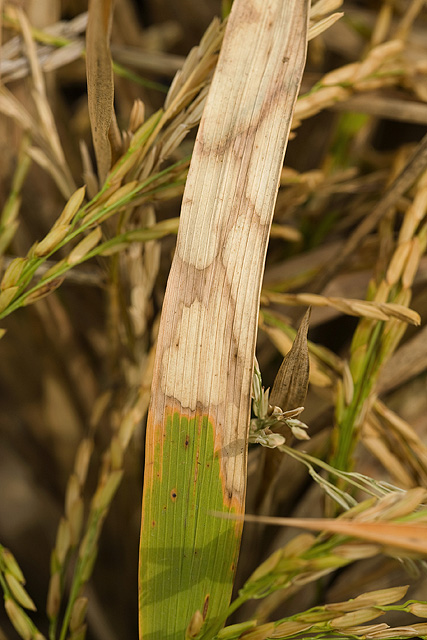
Sheath blight on a rice sheath

A number of diseases and pests pose threats to rice cultivation within the state of Arkansas. One such culprit, Pyricularia grisea, commonly known as rice blast, is an invasive fungus that spreads primarily through infected rice stubble from the prior year, related host species and even sometimes infected seed. Though epidemics of the fungus seem to be sporadic (infected seed most likely accounts for the randomness in distribution of the rice blast in Arkansas rice fields), "rice blast has caused significant yield losses in Arkansas." Another disease that is actually "second only to, and often rivals, rice blast in importance" is sheath blight, which is a soil borne pathogen the initial symptoms of which commonly begin with "lesions on the sheaths of lower leaves when plants are in the late tillering or early internode elongation stage of growth." The weed that poses perhaps the largest threat to Arkansas rice is barnyard grass, due to its "widespread resistance to propanil and quinclorac, two of the most frequently used herbicides." Along with this, "weedy red rice (Oryza sativa) is a problematic weed in cultivated rice," and of the rice fields in Arkansas that account for 50% of the nation's rice crop, "about 60% of these...have some red rice infestation." Weeds such as barnyard grass and weedy red rice can often have detrimental effects to rice fields throughout the state of Arkansas, accounting for over $22 million worth of crop yield losses in 1992.

== See also ==
- Rice Belt
- Rice production in the United States
