= Economy of Arkansas =

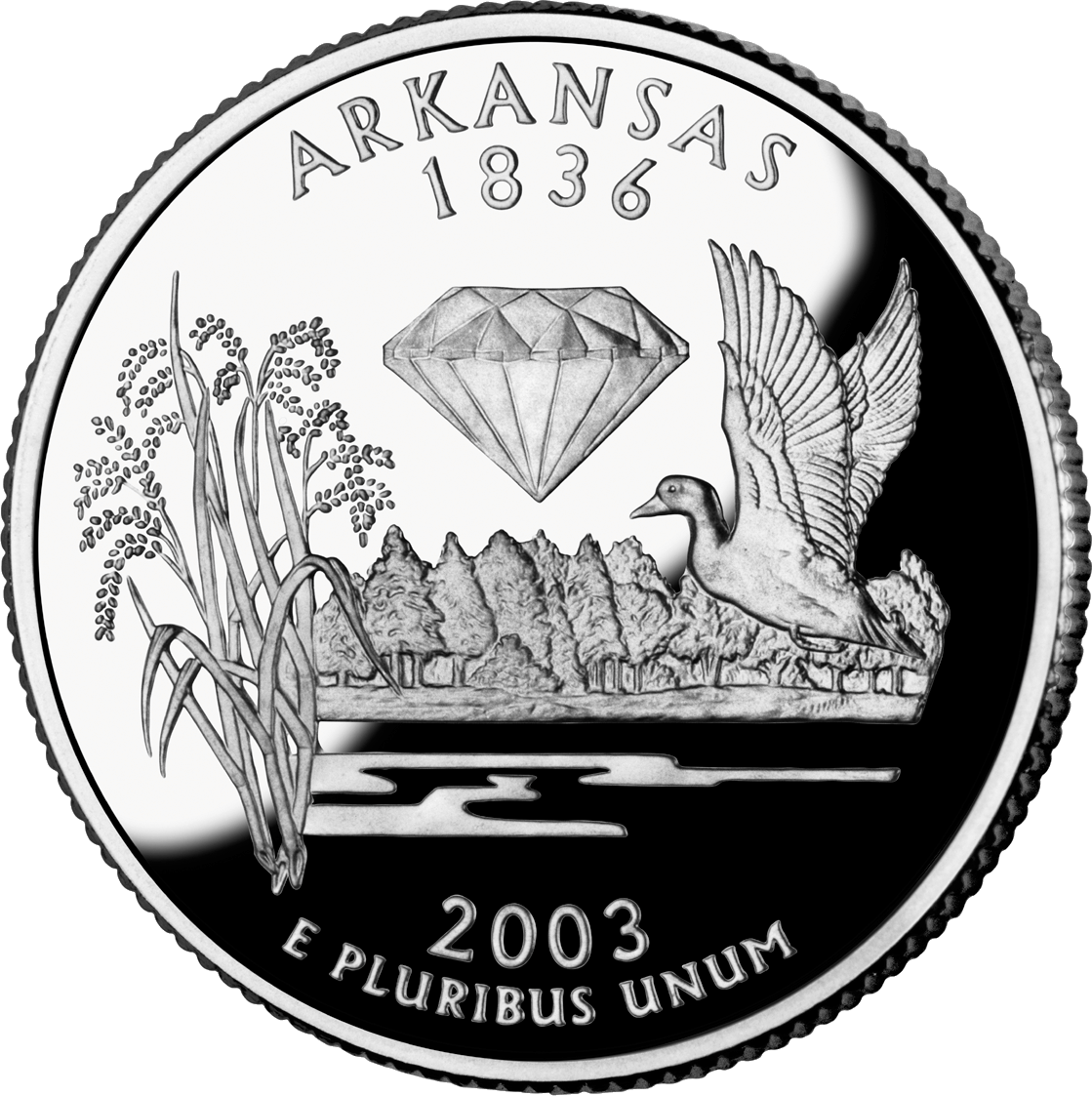
- State quarter

Statistics
- GDP: $188.7 billion (2024)
- GDP per capita: $54,347
- Population below national poverty line: 19.1%
- Gini coefficient: 0.4773
- Labor force: 1,349,512
- Unemployment: 4.0%

Public finance
- Revenue: $4,604 million
- Spending: $4,604 million

The economy of Arkansas produced $188.7 billion of gross domestic product in 2024, ranking 34th in the nation. Six Fortune 500 companies are based in Arkansas, including the world's #1 corporation by revenue, Walmart. Arkansas's per capita income for 2023 was $54,347, and the median household income was $55,432, which ranked 47th among U.S. states.

According to CNBC, Arkansas currently ranks as the 35th best state for business, with the 10th-lowest cost of doing business, 8th-lowest cost of living, 41st best workforce, 29th-best economic climate, 41st-best educated workforce, 41st-best infrastructure and the 32nd-friendliest regulatory environment. Arkansas gained twelve spots in the best state for business rankings since 2011.

Arkansas ranks as one of the top states for charitable giving. In 2011, Arkansans gave 6.3% of their discretionary income to charity, ranking it as the seventh-most generous state. The Pine Bluff metropolitan area ranked as the seventh-most charitable metro area in the nation during the same time period.

== Exports ==
The state's 2011 exports totaled $5.6 billion. Civilian aircraft was the primary export from Arkansas in 2011 in terms of market share, worth approximately half a billion dollars. Poultry, cotton, rice, graders, ammunition, organic chemicals, steel, and shock absorbers are also important exports from Arkansas. Dassault Falcon Jet Corporation in Little Rock is one of the largest foreign-owned corporations in Arkansas.

Arkansas's primary exporting partners in 2011 included Canada (24.9%), Mexico (12.1%), China (7.4%), Japan (3.8%), South Korea (3.5%), France (3.0%), and Singapore (3.0%).

The state also ranks third in terms of channel catfish aquaculture, with about 19,200 acres (78 km^{2}) under catfish farming in 2010. The peak of catfish farming in the state was in 2002, when 38,000 acres (150 km^{2}) were under farming. In 2007, the state's catfish producers generated sales of $71.5 million – 16 percent of the total U.S. market. Arkansas was the first state to develop commercial catfish farms in the late 1950s. The number of catfish farms in the state grew through the 1990s as farmers entered the catfish business as a way to provide additional income during a time of low prices for cotton and soybeans.

== Largest companies ==
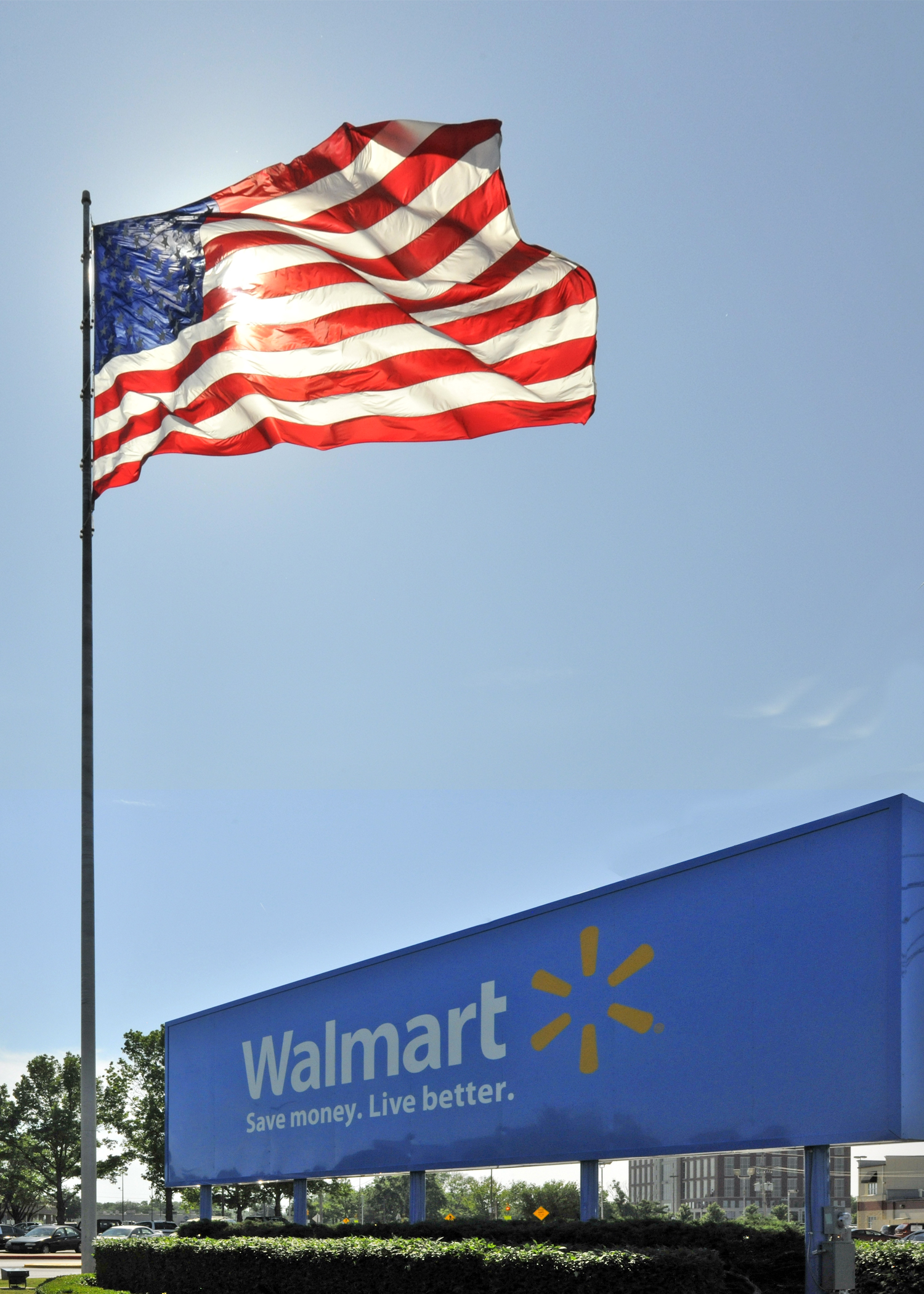
Walmart Home Office in Bentonville

=== Public companies ===
The following table lists the public companies headquartered in Arkansas with 2017 revenues placing them in the Fortune 1000 largest U.S. companies.

State Rank by Revenue	Company Name	National Rank	Revenue ($ billions) 2012 estimate	Headquarters City	NAICS sector
1	Walmart	1	500.3	Bentonville	Retail trade/warehouse clubs and supercenters
2	Tyson Foods	80	38.3	Springdale	All other miscellaneous food manufacturing
3	Murphy USA	279	10.9	El Dorado	Convenience stores
4	J. B. Hunt	395	7.2	Lowell	Freight transportation arrangement
5	Dillard's	439	6.4	Little Rock	Department stores
6	Windstream	474	5.8	Little Rock	Communication services, not elsewhere classified
7	ArcBest Corporation	763	2.8	Fort Smith	General freight trucking
8	Murphy Oil	902	2.2	El Dorado	Crude petroleum extraction

=== Private companies ===
The following table lists the only privately held companies headquartered in Arkansas with 2011 revenues over $1 billion.

State rank by revenue	Company name	National rank	Revenue ($ billions), 2007 estimate	Employees	Headquarters city	NAICS sector
1	Golden Living	154	2.73	42,000	Fort Smith	Other individual and family services

== Energy ==
=== Production ===
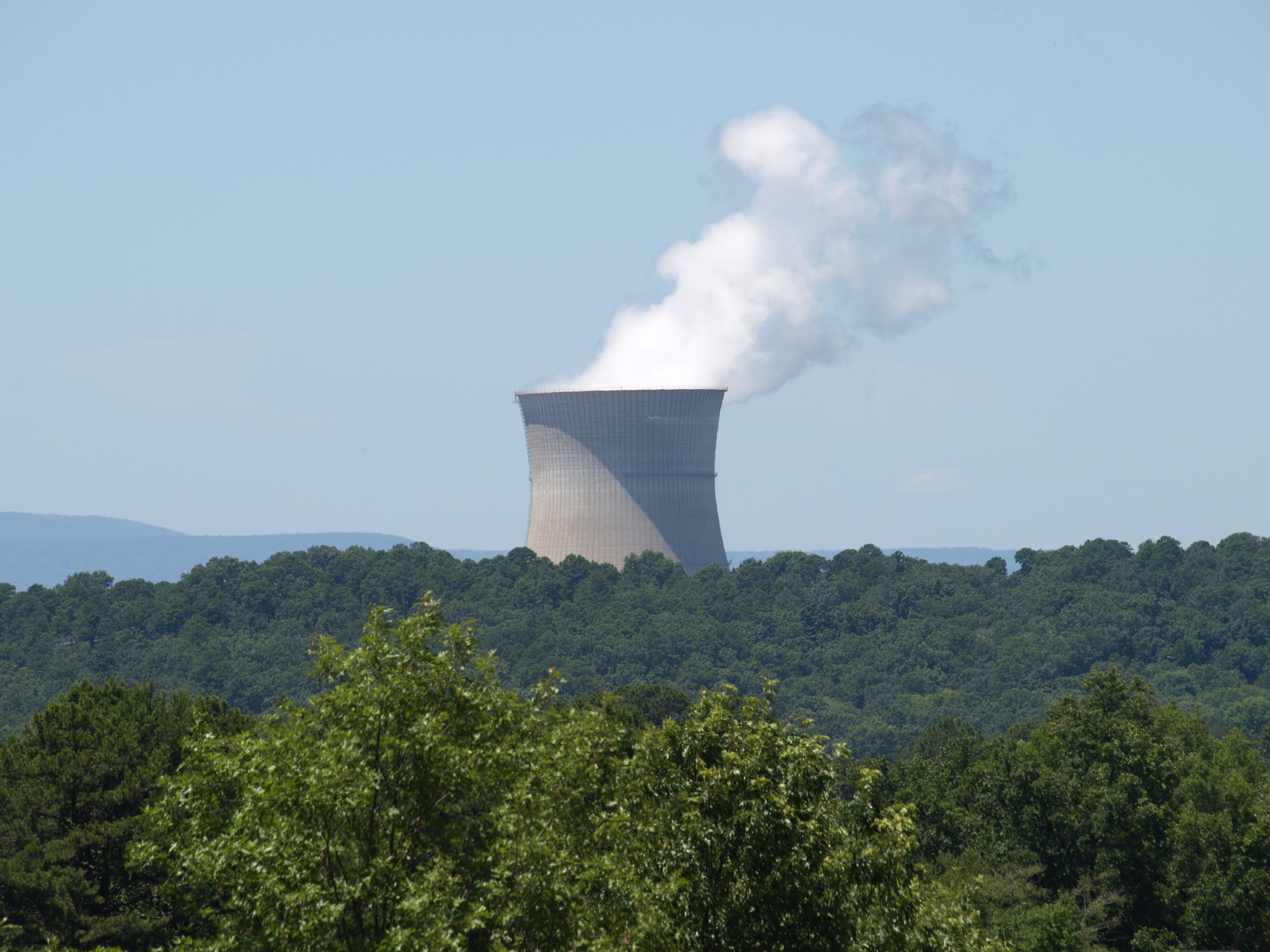
The nuclear reactors at Arkansas Nuclear One in Russellville provide the state of Missouri and other states with electricity.

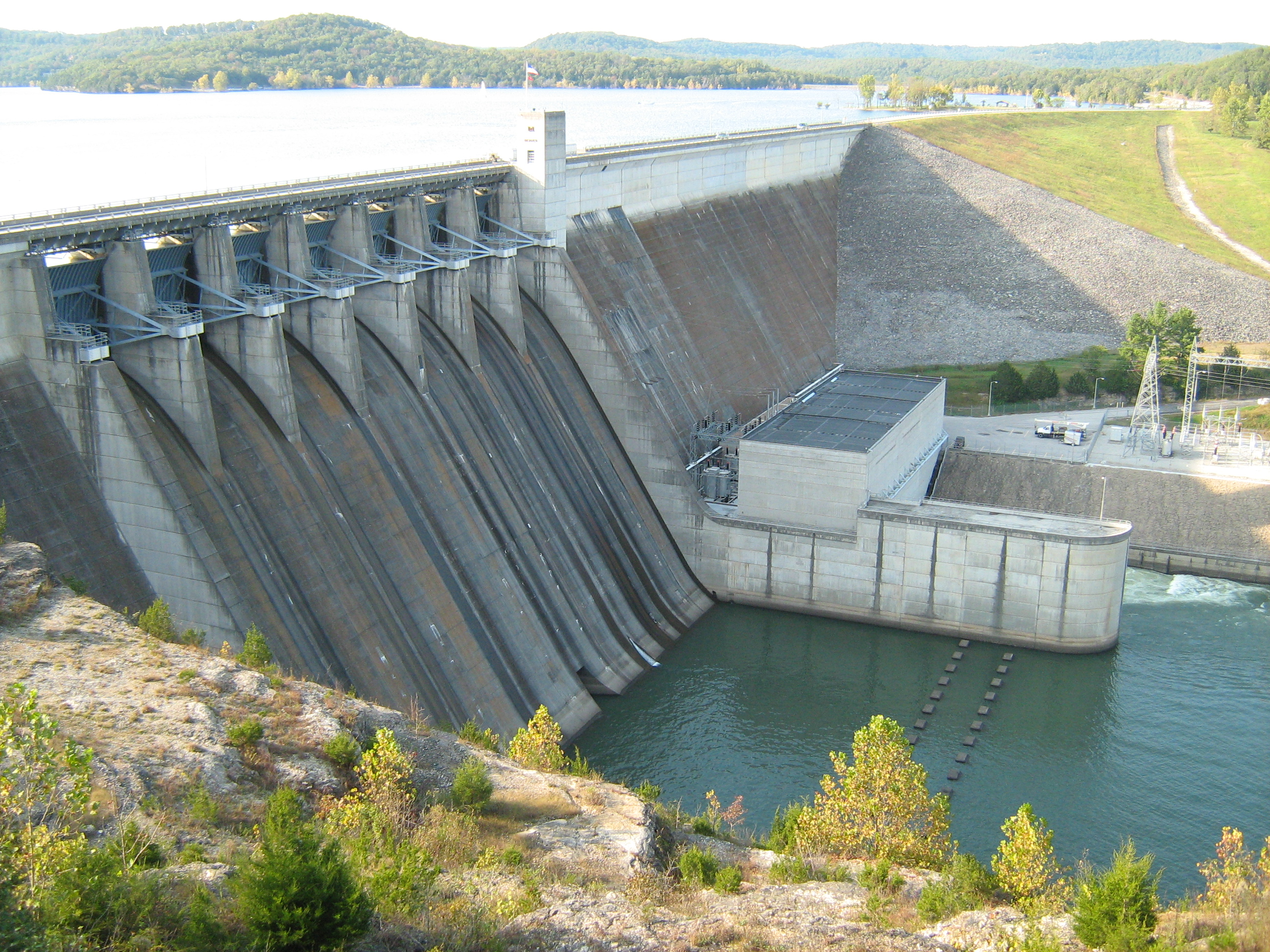
Beaver Dam in Carroll County is capable of producing 340 megawatts (460,000 hp) of energy at capacity.

Arkansas produced 588,700,000,000,000 British thermal units (1.725×10^{11} kWh) in 2007, mostly from coal, petroleum, nuclear, and renewable energy sources. In 2024, 38% of Arkansas's energy production was from natural gas, 26% from coal, 25% from nuclear, and 11% from renewables, mainly hydroelectricity, solar power, and biomass-fueled generating facilities. Arkansas imports petroleum for use in the transportation sector but is a net exporter of electric power, selling 20,400,000,000,000 British thermal units (6.0×10^{9} kWh) to the national electric grid in 2007. The industrial sector, which includes agriculture, accounts about two-fifths of the state's total energy use, the most of any end-use sector. The state's low population density results in higher electricity costs and more gallons of fuel used per vehicle. Arkansas consumes more natural gas and renewable energy and less fossil fuels than the national average.

Petroleum production in Arkansas began with a boom in the early 1920s in southern Arkansas. Largely produced by Union, Lafayette, Columbia, and Ouachita counties, the boom began when the Busey Well No. 1 was completed on January 10, 1921. The region, especially El Dorado and Smackover, oil production exploded into a large part of the Arkansas economy. Today, petroleum is a minor piece of the state economy and the state produces about 0.1% of the nation's total crude oil output. Today, remnants of the oil boom include Murphy Oil, a gasoline retailer and Arkansas Museum of Natural Resources, which informs visitors of the history of oil in the area. Arkansas has two oil refineries, the El Dorado Refinery and the Smackover Refinery, that have a combined processing capacity of almostf 91,000 bbl/d (14,500 m^{3}/d).

Natural gas has become an important source of energy and economic activity in north central Arkansas. Hydraulic fracturing in the Fayetteville Shale has impacted much of the region's economy, including Cleburne, Conway, Faulkner, Van Buren, and White counties. The state ranked 12th in terms of marketed production of natural gas in 2007. However, health and environmental concerns, including the possible responsibility for earthquakes called the Guy-Greenbrier earthquake swarm have slowed the continued development of activity in the region.

Although accounting for a small portion of Arkansas's energy production mixture, coal reserves are being mined in the state. Coal is mostly located in the Arkansas River Valley in western Arkansas. The state has significant lignite deposits as well. Arkansas coal has very low sulfur content compared to national averages.

Renewable energy plays an important role in Arkansas's energy production and consumption cycle. The state's energy mix included 10% renewables, compared to a national average of 5.7%, in 2007. Hydroelectric power is the state's largest source of renewable energy. Dams such as Beaver, Bull Shoals, Greers Ferry, and Dardanelle Lock and Dam all have capability of producing hydroelectric power. Although Arkansas ranks 27th nationally in wind energy potential, the state has few wind turbines installed. However, the world's largest turbine blade manufacturer, LM Wind Power and Nordex, a turbine component company have both added facilities in the state.

=== Oil and gas ===
Arkansas is ranked 43rd in oil production and 40th in natural gas production among the states in 2020. Oil and Gas production provides thousand of jobs in Arkansas. The jobs include including exploration, drilling, production, transportation, and refining.

== Agriculture ==
Agriculture is an important component of Arkansas's economy, the majority of agricultural production is of livestock. Rice cultivation in Arkansas is significant. Much of Arkansas's farmland is irrigated.

By employment, agriculture was the largest industry in Arkansas in 2023.

== State taxes ==
Arkansas imposes a state income tax with six brackets, ranging from 1.0% to 7.0%. The first $9,000 of military pay of enlisted personnel is exempt from Arkansas tax; officers do not have to pay state income tax on the first $6,000 of their military pay. Retirees pay no tax on Social Security, or on the first $6,000 in gain on their pensions along with recovery of cost basis. Residents of Texarkana, Arkansas are exempt from Arkansas income tax; wages and business income earned there by residents of Texarkana, Texas are also exempt. Arkansas's gross receipts (sales) tax and compensating (use) tax rate is currently 6%. The state has also mandated that various services be subject to sales tax collection. They include wrecker and towing services; for-hire transportation; dry cleaning and laundry; body piercing, tattooing and electrolysis; pest control; security and alarm monitoring; self-storage facilities; boat storage and docking; and pet grooming and kennel services.

Along with the state sales tax, there are more than 300 local taxes in Arkansas. Cities and counties have the authority to enact additional local sales and use taxes if they are passed by the voters in their area. These local taxes have a ceiling or cap; they cannot exceed $25 for each 1% of tax assessed. These additional taxes are collected by the state, which distributes the money back to the local jurisdictions monthly. Low-income taxpayers with a total annual household income of less than $12,000 are permitted a sales tax exemption for electricity usage.

Sales of alcoholic beverages account for added taxes. A 10% supplemental mixed drink tax is imposed on the sale of alcoholic beverages (excluding beer) at restaurants. A 4% tax is due on the sale of all mixed drinks (except beer and wine) sold for "on-premises" consumption. A 3% tax is due on beer sold for off-premises consumption.

Property taxes are assessed on real and personal property; only 20% of the value is used as the tax base.

== Incentives ==
Several interest groups, business owners, and policymakers are engaged in using government power to incentivize businesses to establish, relocate, or expand in Arkansas. Primary entities involved include the Arkansas Economic Development Commission, Arkansas Department of Commerce, Arkansas Development Finance Authority, United States Department of Agriculture Rural Development (USDA/RD), and local chambers of commerce.

Arkansas Act 9 of 1960 allow cities and counties to issue industrial revenue bonds, typically called "Act 9 bonds" in the state. They are often underwritten by AEDC or ADFA, typically tax exempt, and sometimes paired with payment in lieu of taxes (PILOT) agreements. Arkansas's tax increment financing (TIF) law was ruled unconstitutional by the Arkansas Supreme Court in 2013; a similar proposal enabling creation of economic development districts is scheduled to be on the November 2026 statewide ballot as Issue 3.
