= Unchurched Belt =

Region in the far Northwestern United States

Most common religious affiliations (or lack thereof) in the 48 contiguous U.S. states, based on the American Religious Identification Survey in 2001.: <30% / <40% / <50% / >50%; / / / / Catholic; / / / / Baptist; / / / / Methodist; / / / / Lutheran; / / / / Mormon; / / / / No religion

The Unchurched Belt is a fluid socio-geographic region of the Western United States characterized by relatively low rates of active religious, namely Christian, participation. The term Unchurched Belt is an informal designation primarily used in the context of the anthropological and sociological studies of American religion, American religious demographics, and American Christianity to describe areas with low church attendance, particularly within established and traditional Christian denominations.

The term derives from "Bible Belt" and the concept of the unchurched, the latter referring to populations of Christians whose adherence to and practice of the religion does not include regular attendance in church congregations or parishes or at church worship services. The belt was originally found in the West and Northwestern United States, but has moved over the decades. The term was first applied to the West Coast of the United States in 1985 by Rodney Stark and William Sims Bainbridge, who found that California, Oregon, and Washington had the lowest church membership rates in the U.S. in 1971, and that there was little change in this pattern between 1971 and 1980. Since 1980, however, California's church membership rate has increased; in 2000, the state had a higher percentage of church members than several states in the Northeast and Midwest. Some religious groups are undercounted in surveys of religious membership.

== 2000 ==
As of 2000, the five states reported to have the lowest rate of religious adherence in the United States were Oregon, Washington, Alaska, Nevada, and West Virginia. Although West Virginia was reported to have a low rate of religious adherence, it was above the national average rate of church attendance. Sociologist Samuel S. Hill, comparing data from the North American Religion Atlas and the American Religious Identity Survey, concluded that a "disproportionately large number of West Virginians" were not counted. In 2006, Gallup reported that the lowest rates of church attendance among the 48 contiguous states were in Nevada and the New England states of Connecticut, New Hampshire, Vermont, Rhode Island, Massachusetts, and Maine. Church attendance in the western states of Oregon, Washington, and California was only slightly higher. A 2008 Gallup poll comparing belief in God among U.S. regions found that only 59% of residents in the Western United States believe in God, compared to 80% in the East, 83% in the Midwest, and 86% in the South.

== 2010 ==
A 2011 Gallup poll showed that when it came to the number of people seeing religion as important in everyday life, New Hampshire and Vermont were the least religious, both with 23%, followed by 25% in Maine.

There has been debate as to whether the Western United States is still the most irreligious part of the U.S., due to New England surpassing it as the region with the highest percentage of residents unaffiliated with any religion. On a state level, it is not clear whether the least religious state resides in New England or the Western U.S., as the 2008 American Religious Identification Survey (ARIS) ranked Vermont as the state with the highest percentage of residents claiming no religion at 34%, but a 2009 Gallup poll ranked Oregon as the state with the highest percentage of residents identifying with "No religion, Atheist, or Agnostic", at 24.6%.

== 2020 ==
By 2020, it appeared that the Bible Belt was shrinking, and each year more states were reporting a higher level of non-participation in religion. In 2023, the Unchurched Belt had moved and covered Nevada, Washington, Oregon, and Alaska.

Figures in 2024 showed that 17 U.S. states reported having less than half their population being ‘highly religious’; those states ranged from Massachusetts and New Hampshire, to Hawaii and Montana.

== See also ==
- Irreligion in the United States
- List of belt regions of the United States
- Religion in the United States
