= Mansfield Plantation =

Historic house in South Carolina, United States

- U.S. National Register of Historic Places
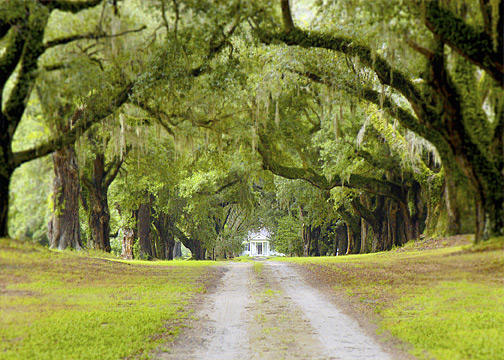
- The "Avenue of Oaks" approach to Mansfield Plantation

- Location within South Carolina Location within the United States
- Location: In Georgetown County, South Carolina. 5 miles north of Georgetown, off U.S. Route 701.
- Coordinates: 33°26′5″N 79°15′33″W
- Area: 55 acres (22 ha)
- NRHP reference No.: 77001223
- Added to NRHP: December 06, 1977

Mansfield Plantation is a well-preserved antebellum rice plantation, established in 1718 on the banks of the Black River in historic Georgetown County, South Carolina.

== History ==
Spanning nearly 1,000 acres (4.0 km^{2}) of pine forest, rice fields and cypress swamps, Mansfield Plantation was once one of the largest rice producing plantation in the country. Mansfield, along with adjacent rice plantations up and down the Black River, provided much of Europe with "Carolina Gold" rice during the late 18th and early 19th centuries.
Rice growing was made possible by:

1. perfecting irrigation techniques using tidal water and manmade dykes.
2. experimentation with natural fertilizers.
3. most notably, African American slave labor.

After the American Civil War, rice production became too expensive and soon the plantations fell into bankruptcy and were sold off to new owners.

== Present day ==
Today, Mansfield Plantation is preserved as an authentic rice plantation, complete with the original plantation home, a schoolhouse, live oak avenue ("oak allée"), chapel, guest house, and grounds. It also has the only remaining winnowing barn in Georgetown County, where rice grains were processed for shipment.

=== Restoration ===
In March 2005 a restoration of a slave village of 7 slave cabins and a chapel had begun, completed shortly thereafter.

=== Media ===
Mansfield Plantation has been featured in numerous films, documentaries and television shows. It served as the backdrop for scenes from Mel Gibson's 2000 film, The Patriot. In 2006, the Fox network filmed two segments of their primetime television series Treasure Hunters at Mansfield and the Fine Living Network filmed a documentary at Mansfield Plantation for their television series Windshield America.

== See also ==
- National Register of Historic Places listings in Georgetown County, South Carolina
- Plantations in South Carolina

== Gallery ==
Views of Mansfield Plantation

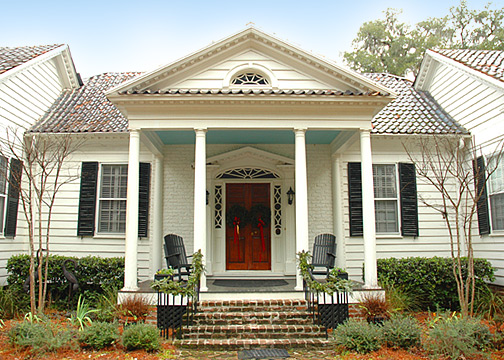
The main house decorated for the holidays

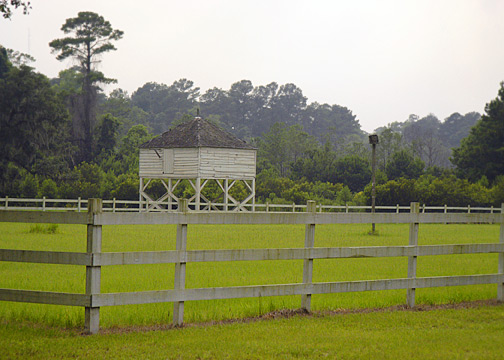
Mansfield's winnowing barn

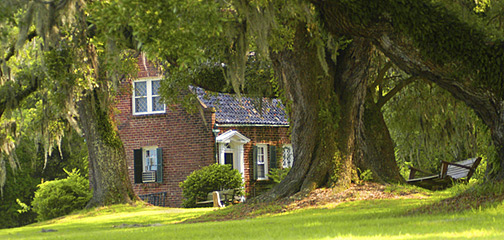
The Old Kitchen Guest House, now a bed and breakfast

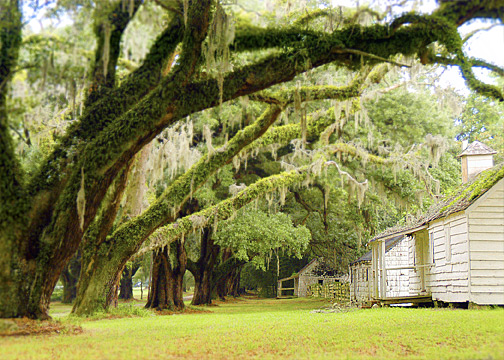
The old slave village, currently undergoing restoration
