= Robert C. Fuller =

Robert C. Fuller (born 1952) is the Caterpillar Professor of Religious Studies at Bradley University. Specializing in religion and psychology, and contemporary religion in America, Fuller is the author of 13 books, including Mesmerism and the American Cure of Souls (1982); Spiritual, But Not Religious: Understanding Unchurched America (2001); and The Body of Faith: A Biological History of Religion in America (2013).

== Education and career ==
After completing his BA in religious studies at Denison University (a former Baptist school), Fuller was awarded his MA and PhD, also in religious studies, by the University of Chicago. He joined the faculty at Bradley University in 1978 as assistant professor of religious studies. In 1983 he became an associate professor and in 1988 a full professor.

Fuller is particularly interested in "unchurched" spirituality in America and metaphysical healing, including mesmerism and homeopathy. Despite declining church membership in America, most Americans believe in some form of higher spiritual power. In Alternative Medicine and American Religious Life (1989), he explores whether the appeal of alternative medicine lies not in addressing ill health but in giving practitioners a sense of this spiritual plane. He argues in Spiritual, but not Religious: Understanding Unchurched America (2001) that "[a]lternative medicines almost invariably promulgate alternative worldviews." Most of those drawn to such systems—New Thought, spirit guides, Swedenborgianism, Theosophy, Transcendentalism—are middle class and physically healthy. In 2018 he wrote that 18–27 percent of Americans could be defined as "Spiritual but not Religious" (SBNR).

== Awards ==
In 1988 Bradley University awarded Fuller the Samuel Rothberg Professional Excellence Award, for outstanding achievements in research and creativity. He was awarded the Charles M. Putnam Award for Teaching Excellence in 1995 and the Caterpillar Professorship for Religious Studies in 2000.

== Personal life ==
Fuller and his wife, Kathy Fuller, married in 1974 and have two children.

== Selected works ==
- (2013) The Body of Faith: A Biological History of Religion in America, Chicago and London: University of Chicago Press.
- (2008) Spirituality in the Flesh: Bodily Sources of Religious Experiences, New York: Oxford University Press.
- (2006) Wonder: From Emotion to Spirituality, Chapel Hill: University of North Carolina Press.
- (2004) Religious Revolutionaries: The Rebels Who Reshaped American Religion, New York: Palgrave Macmillan.
- (2001) Spiritual, But Not Religious: Understanding Unchurched America, New York: Oxford University Press.
- (2000) Stairways to Heaven: Drugs in American Religious History, Boulder: Westview Press.
- (1996) Religion and Wine: A Cultural History of Wine Drinking in the United States, Knoxville: University of Tennessee Press.
- (1995) Naming the Antichrist: The History of an American Obsession, New York: Oxford University Press.
- (1992) Ecology of Care: An Interdisciplinary Analysis of the Self and Moral Obligation, Louisville: Westminster/John Knox Press.
- (1989) Alternative Medicine and American Religious Life, New York: Oxford University Press.
- (1988) Religion and the Life Cycle, Philadelphia: Fortress Press.
- (1986) Americans and the Unconscious, New York: Oxford University Press.
- (1982) Mesmerism and the American Cure of Souls, Philadelphia: University of Pennsylvania Press.

== See also ==
- Religion in the United States
