= Unchurched =

Christians unconnected with a church

"Unchurched" (alternatively, "The Unchurched" or "unchurched people") means, in the broad sense, people who are Christians but not connected with a church.

The term is not well-defined; different people understand it differently. In research on religious participation, it refers more specifically to people who do not attend worship services. In this sense it differs slightly from the term 'nones' which denotes an absence of affiliation with a religion and not an absence of attendance at religious services. The word will normally be used to describe a person who has come from a Christian background, but is no longer connected to a religious group. The Barna Group defines the term to mean "an adult (18 or older) who has not attended a Christian church service within the past six months" excluding special services such as Easter, Christmas, weddings or funerals. Edward L. Ericson, a former member of the Joint Washington Office for Social Concerns, defines "unchurched" as anyone who refuses to join a religious organization "out of principle".

Throughout history the word "unchurched" was a derogatory reference to people lacking access to culture or education or referred to inappropriate, improper or impolite behavior. It is no longer used this way.

It was estimated that there were 130 million "unchurched people" in the US in 2021.

== See also ==
- Church attendance
- Nominal Christian
- Unchurched Belt
