= Rice Belt =

Area of the United States that includes Arkansas, Louisiana, Mississippi, and Texas

Coordinates: 34°N 91°W

States of the Rice Belt, in green

Rice production by county in the United States in 2010

The Rice Belt of the United States includes Arkansas, Louisiana, Mississippi, and Texas, four southern U.S. states that grow a significant portion of the nation's rice crop. The name is in conformity with the Corn Belt of the Midwestern United States, in which much of the nation's corn is grown.

Arkansas is the nation's leading rice producer, followed by California (not part of the Rice Belt), Louisiana, Mississippi, Texas, and Missouri (bordering on, but not part of, the Rice Belt).

== See also ==
- Acadiana
- Arkansas Delta
- Mississippi Delta
- Missouri Bootheel
- Rice cultivation in Arkansas
- Rice production in the United States
- Texas rice production
