= Protestantism in the United States =

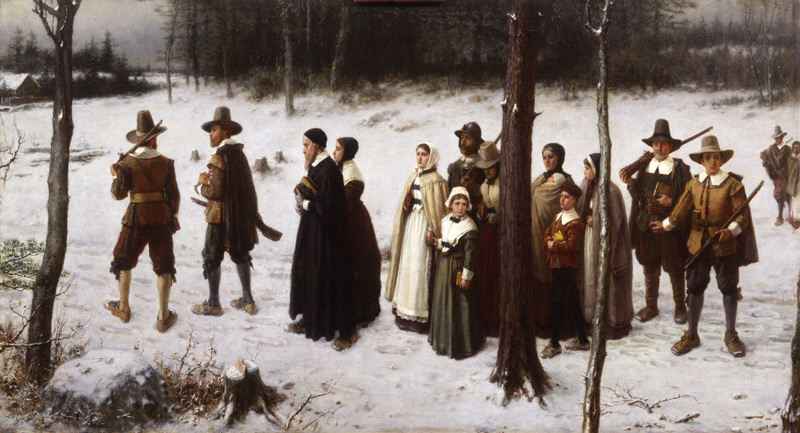
- Pilgrims Going to Church, an 1867 portrait of Puritans in the New England colonies by George Henry Boughton
- Orientation: Evangelicalism (predominantly)
- Polity: Various
- Associations: American Council of Christian Churches; Churches Uniting in Christ; National Association of Evangelicals; National Council of Churches
- Region: United States of America
- Origin: Since the 17th century
- Members: 43% of Americans (141 million as of 2019)

Protestantism is the largest grouping of Christians in the United States, with its combined denominations comprising about 43% of the country's population (or 141 million people) in 2019. Other estimates suggest that 48.5% of the U.S. population (or 157 million people) is Protestant. This is the largest Protestant population of any country, around 20% of the world's total Protestant population. Baptists comprise about one-third of American Protestants. The Southern Baptist Convention is the largest single Protestant denomination in the U.S., comprising one-tenth of American Protestants. Twelve of the original Thirteen Colonies were Protestant, with only Maryland having a sizable Catholic population due to Lord Baltimore's religious tolerance.

The country's history is often traced back to the Pilgrim Fathers whose Brownist beliefs motivated their move from England to the New World. These English Dissenters, who also happened to be Puritans—and therefore Calvinists—were first to settle in what was to become the Plymouth Colony. America's Calvinist heritage is often underlined by various experts, researchers and authors, prompting some to declare that the United States was "founded on Calvinism", while also underlining its exceptional foundation as a Protestant majority nation. American Protestantism has been diverse from the very beginning with large numbers of early immigrants being Anglican, various Reformed, Lutheran, and Anabaptist. In the next centuries, it diversified even more with the Great Awakenings throughout the country.

Protestants are divided into many different denominations, which are generally classified as either "mainline" or "evangelical", although some may not fit easily into either category. Some historically African-American denominations are also classified as Black churches. Protestantism had undergone an unprecedented development on American soil, diversifying into multiple branches, denominations, several interdenominational and related movements, as well as many other developments. All have since expanded on a worldwide scale mainly through missionary work.

== Statistics ==
The map above shows plurality religious denomination by state as of 2023 to 2024. In 35 out of the 50 states, Protestantism took a plurality of the state's population. Protestant 70–79% 60–69% 50–59% 40–49% Under 40% Catholic 40–49% Under 40% Mormon 50–59% Unaffiliated 40–49% Under 40%

Protestants in the United States by tradition according to the Pew Research Center (2014)
1. Evangelical Protestant (55.0%)
2. Mainline Protestant (32.0%)
3. Black church (14.0%)
Protestants in the United States by branch according to the Pew Research Center (2014)
1. Baptist (33.0%)
2. Nondenominational Protestant (13.0%)
3. Methodist (10.0%)
4. Pentecostal (10.0%)
5. Unspecified Protestant (8.00%)
6. Lutheran (8.00%)
7. Presbyterian (5.00%)
8. Restorationist (4.00%)
9. Episcopalian/Anglican (3.00%)
10. Holiness (2.00%)
11. Congregationalist (1.00%)
12. Adventist (1.00%)
13. Anabaptist (1.00%)
14. Other evangelical or fundamentalist, other Reformed, Pietist, Quaker (1.00%)
Protestants in the United States by denomination according to the Pew Research Center (2014)
1. Other denomination (55.0%)
2. Southern Baptist Convention (11.0%)
3. United Methodist Church (8.00%)
4. American Baptist Churches USA (3.00%)
5. Churches of Christ (3.00%)
6. Evangelical Lutheran Church in America (3.00%)
7. National Baptist Convention, USA, Inc. (3.00%)
8. Assemblies of God USA (3.00%)
9. Lutheran Church-Missouri Synod (2.00%)
10. Presbyterian Church (USA) (2.00%)
11. Episcopal Church (2.00%)
12. Church of God in Christ (1.00%)
13. Seventh-day Adventist Church (1.00%)
14. United Church of Christ (1.00%)
15. Presbyterian Church in America (1.00%)
16. Church of God (Cleveland, Tennessee) (1.00%)

By tradition: Protestantism in the United States according to the Pew Research Center (2014)
Affiliation	% of U.S. population
Protestant	46.5
Evangelical Protestant	25.4
Mainline Protestant	14.7
Black church	6.5

By identification as born-again or evangelical: Protestantism in the United States according to the Pew Research Center (2014)
Affiliation	% of U.S. population
Protestant	46.5
Born-again or evangelical	30
Not born-again or evangelical	16.5

By branch: Protestantism in the United States according to the Pew Research Center (2014)
Affiliation	% of U.S. population
Protestant	46.5
Baptist	15.4
Nondenominational Protestant	6.2
Methodist	4.6
Pentecostal	4.6
Unspecified Protestant	3.8
Lutheran	3.5
Presbyterian	2.2
Restorationist	1.9
Episcopalian/Anglican	1.3
Holiness	0.8
Congregationalist	0.6
Adventist	0.6
Anabaptist	0.3
Other evangelical/fundamentalist	0.3
other Reformed	0.3
Pietist	0.3
Quaker	0.3

By denomination: Protestantism in the United States according to the Pew Research Center (2014)
Affiliation	% of U.S. population
Protestant	46.5
Other denomination	25.2
Southern Baptist Convention	5.3
United Methodist Church	3.6
American Baptist Churches USA	1.5
Churches of Christ	1.5
Evangelical Lutheran Church in America	1.4
National Baptist Convention, USA, Inc.	1.4
Assemblies of God USA	1.4
Lutheran Church-Missouri Synod	1.1
Presbyterian Church (USA)	0.9
Episcopal Church	0.9
Church of God in Christ	0.6
Seventh-day Adventist Church	0.5
United Church of Christ	0.4
Presbyterian Church in America	0.4
Church of God (Cleveland, Tennessee)	0.4

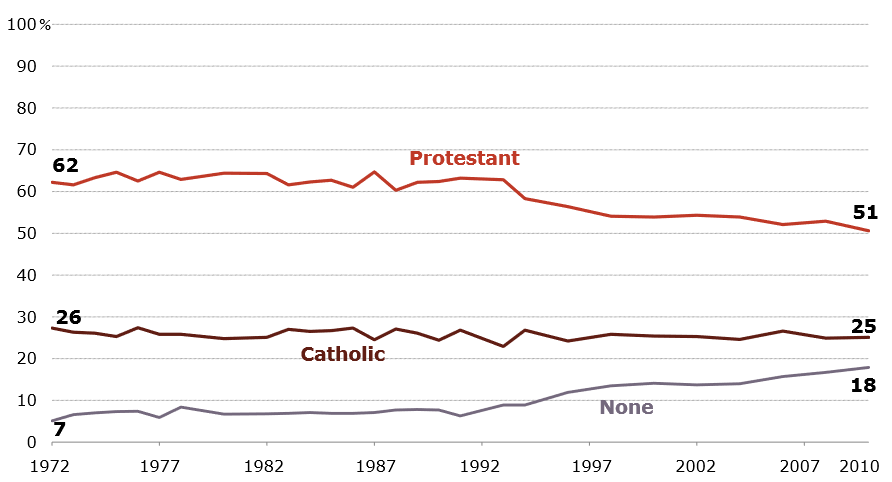
Chart showing dynamics of three main religious categories in the United States between 1972 and 2010.

== Branches ==
=== Baptists ===
Baptists are the largest Protestant grouping in the United States accounting for one-third of all American Protestants.

Baptist churches were organized, starting in 1814, as the Triennial Convention. In 1845, most southern congregations split, founding the Southern Baptist Convention, which is now the largest Protestant denomination in the U.S., with 12.3 million members as of 2025. The Triennial Convention was reorganized into what is now American Baptist Churches USA and includes 1.1 million members and 5,057 congregations.

African American Baptists, excluded from full participation in white Baptist organizations, have formed several denominations, of which the largest are the National Baptist Convention, and the more liberal Progressive National Baptist Convention.

There are numerous smaller bodies, some recently organized and others with long histories, such as the two original strands: the Particular Baptists and General Baptists, and the Free Will Baptists, Primitive Baptists, Strict Baptists, Old Regular Baptists, Two-Seed-in-the-Spirit Predestinarian Baptists, Independent Baptists, Seventh Day Baptists and others.

Baptists have been present in the part of North America that is now the United States since the early 17th century. Both Roger Williams and John Clarke, his compatriot in working for religious freedom, are credited with founding the Baptist faith in North America. In 1639, Williams established a Baptist church in Providence, Rhode Island (First Baptist Church in America) and Clarke began a Baptist church in Newport, Rhode Island (First Baptist Church in Newport). According to a Baptist historian who has researched the matter, "There is much debate over the centuries as to whether the Providence or Newport church deserved the place of 'first' Baptist congregation in America. Exact records for both congregations are lacking."

==== Largest Baptist denominations ====
The Handbook of Denominations in the United States identifies and describes 31 Baptist groups or conventions in the United States. A partial list follows. (Unless otherwise noted, statistics are taken from the Baptist World Alliance website, and reflect 2006 data.)

- Southern Baptist Convention: 46,608 congregations, 12.3 million members (2025)
- National Baptist Convention, USA, Inc.: 31,000 congregations, 7.5 million members (African-American) (2013)
- National Baptist Convention of America, Inc.: 12,000 congregations, 3.1 million members (African-American)
- Progressive National Baptist Convention: 1,200 congregations, 2.5 million members (African-American)
- Baptist General Convention of Texas: 4,200 congregations, 1.7 million members
- Baptist Bible Fellowship International: 3,400 congregations, 1.4 million members
- American Baptist Churches USA: 5,100 congregations, 1.1 million members

=== Presbyterian ===
Presbyterians largely came from Scotland or Ulster (Northern Ireland today) to the Middle Colonies, most commonly Pennsylvania. Princeton University was established in 1746 by Presbyterians (Particularly Jonathan Dickinson and Aaron Burr Sr.) to rigorously educate clergymen in alignment to the theology pioneered by William Tennent, and later went on to produce the "Princeton Theologians" such as Charles Hodge.

Under the influence of Scottish theologians like Samuel Rutherford and John Knox, Presbyterians largely believed in the idea that "Resistance to tyranny is obedience to God." Vastly in fervent support of the American Revolution, the Revolutionary War was dubbed the "Presbyterian Rebellion" by King George III and other loyalists.

The first ministers were recruited from Northern Ireland. While several Presbyterian churches had been established by the late 1600s, they were not yet organized into presbyteries and synods until the early 1700s.

- Presbyterian Church (U.S.A.) mainline church has approximately 1,019,000 members and 8,304 congregations. It adopted the Book of Confessions which include the Westminster Confession. Headquarters is in Louisville, Kentucky.
- Presbyterian Church in America Evangelical, Calvinist church, adheres to the Westminster Confession of Faith. The denomination has 374,000 members and 1912 congregations and several congregation outside the United States, in Germany, Japan, Cayman Islands, etc. Headquarters is located in Lawrenceville, Georgia.
- Evangelical Presbyterian Church (United States) has more than 600 congregations and 145,000 members. Adhere to the Westminster Confession.
- Evangelical Reformed Church in America
- Orthodox Presbyterian Church was formed in 1936 under the influence of John Gresham Machen, has 31,000 members.
- Evangelical Covenant Order, 60,000 members in 357 congregations.
- Bible Presbyterian Church
- Associate Reformed Presbyterian Church
- Free Presbyterian Church in North America
- Reformed Presbyterian Church in North America
- Cumberland Presbyterian Church
- Cumberland Presbyterian Church in America
- Free Reformed Church in North America
- Reformed Church in America
- Christian Reformed Church in North America
- Netherlands Reformed Congregations
- Hungarian Reformed Church in America

=== Lutheranism ===
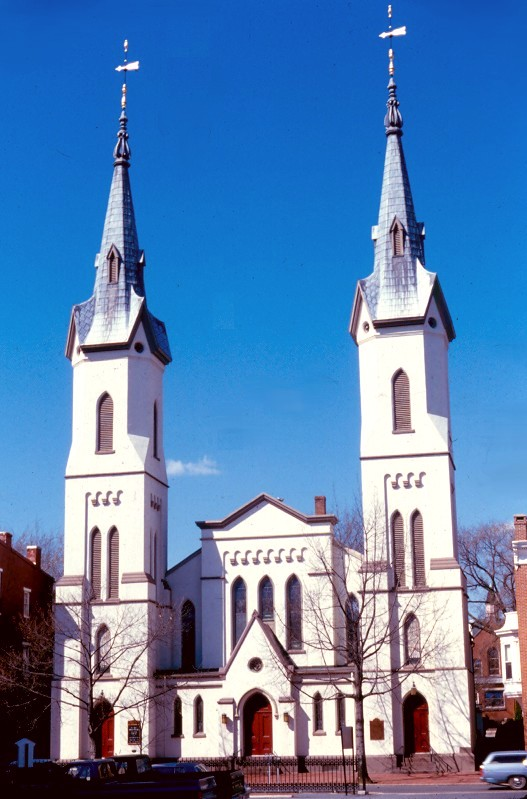
Evangelical Lutheran Church in Frederick, Maryland, built in 1752

With 2.6 million members, the Evangelical Lutheran Church in America (ELCA) is the largest American Lutheran denomination, followed by the Lutheran Church–Missouri Synod (LCMS) with 1.7 million members, and the Wisconsin Evangelical Lutheran Synod (WELS) with 344,000 members. The differences between the Evangelical Lutheran Church in America (ELCA) and the Lutheran Church–Missouri Synod (LCMS) largely arise from historical and cultural factors, although some are theological in character. The ELCA tends to be more involved in ecumenical endeavors than the LCMS.

When Lutherans came to North America, they started church bodies that reflected, to some degree, the churches left behind. Many maintained their immigrant languages until the early 20th century. They sought pastors from the "old country" until patterns for the education of clergy could be developed in America. Eventually, seminaries and church colleges were established in many places to serve the Lutheran churches in North America and, initially, especially to prepare pastors to serve congregations.

The LCMS sprang from German immigrants fleeing the forced Prussian Union, who settled in the St. Louis area and has a continuous history since it was established in 1847. The LCMS is the second largest Lutheran church body in North America (1.7 million). It identifies itself as a church with an emphasis on biblical doctrine and faithful adherence to the historic Lutheran confessions. Insistence by some LCMS leaders on a strict reading of all passages of Scripture led to a rupture in the mid-1970s, which in turn resulted in the formation of the Association of Evangelical Lutheran Churches, now part of the ELCA.

Although its strongly conservative views on theology and ethics might seem to make the LCMS politically compatible with other Evangelicals in the U.S., the LCMS as an organization largely eschews political activity, partly out of its strict understanding of the Lutheran distinction between the Two Kingdoms. It does, however, encourage its members to be politically active, and LCMS members are often involved in political organizations such as Lutherans for Life.

The earliest predecessor synod of the Evangelical Lutheran Church in America was constituted on August 25, 1748, in Philadelphia. It was known as the Ministerium of Pennsylvania and Adjacent States. The ELCA is the product of a series of mergers and represents the largest (3.0 million members) Lutheran church body in North America. The ELCA was created in 1988 by the uniting of the 2.85-million-member Lutheran Church in America, 2.25-million-member American Lutheran Church, and the 100,000-member Association of Evangelical Lutheran Churches. The ALC and LCA had come into being in the early 1960s, as a result of mergers of eight smaller ethnically based Lutheran bodies.

The ELCA, through predecessor church bodies, is a founding member of the Lutheran World Federation, World Council of Churches and the National Council of Churches USA. The LCMS, maintaining its position as a confessional church body emphasizing the importance of full agreement in the teachings of the Bible, does not belong to any of these. However, it is a member of the International Lutheran Council, made up of over 30 Lutheran Churches worldwide that support the confessional doctrines of the Bible and the Book of Concord. The WELS, along with the Evangelical Lutheran Synod (ELS), are part of the international Confessional Evangelical Lutheran Conference (CELC).

=== Pentecostalism ===
Pentecostalism is a renewalist religious movement within Protestantism, that places special emphasis on a direct personal experience of God through the baptism of the Holy Spirit. The term Pentecostal is derived from Pentecost, a Greek term describing the Jewish Feast of Weeks. For Christians, this event commemorates the descent of the Holy Spirit and Pentecostals tend to see their movement as reflecting the same kind of spiritual power, worship styles and teachings that were found in the early church.

Pentecostalism is an umbrella term that includes a wide range of different theological and organizational perspectives. As a result, there is no single central organization or church that directs the movement. Most Pentecostals consider themselves to be part of broader Christian groups; for example, most Pentecostals identify as Protestants. Many embrace the term Evangelical, while others prefer Restorationist. Pentecostalism is theologically and historically close to the Charismatic Movement, as it significantly influenced that movement; some Pentecostals use the two terms interchangeably.

Within classical Pentecostalism there are three major orientations: Wesleyan-Holiness, Higher Life, and Oneness. Examples of Wesleyan-Holiness denominations include the Church of God in Christ (COGIC) and the International Pentecostal Holiness Church (IPHC). The International Church of the Foursquare Gospel is an example of the Higher Life branch, while the Assemblies of God (AG) was influenced by both groups. Some Oneness Pentecostal (Nontrinitarian) churches include the United Pentecostal Church International (UPCI) and Pentecostal Assemblies of the World (PAW). Many Pentecostal sects are affiliated with the Pentecostal World Conference.

- Assemblies of God, Evangelical

== Mainline vs. evangelical ==
In typical usage, the term mainline is contrasted with evangelical. The distinction between the two can be due as much to sociopolitical attitude as to theological doctrine, although doctrinal differences may exist as well. Theologically conservative critics accuse the mainline churches of "the substitution of leftist social action for Christian evangelizing, and the disappearance of biblical theology", and maintain that "All the Mainline churches have become essentially the same church: their histories, their theologies, and even much of their practice lost to a uniform vision of social progress."

The Association of Religion Data Archives (ARDA) counts 26,344,933 members of mainline churches versus 39,930,869 members of evangelical Protestant churches. There is evidence of a shift in membership from mainline denominations to evangelical churches.

As shown in the table below, some denominations with similar names and historical ties to evangelical groups are considered mainline. For example, while the American Baptist Churches, the Evangelical Lutheran Church in America, and the Presbyterian Church (USA) are mainline, the Southern Baptist Convention, Lutheran Church–Missouri Synod, and the Presbyterian Church in America are grouped as evangelical. However, many confessional denominations within the Magisterial Protestant traditions (such as the LCMS for Lutheranism) do not accurately fit under either categorization.

Mainline vs. Evangelical (2001)
Family	Total:	US%	Examples	Type
Baptist	38,662,005	25.3%	Southern Baptist Convention	Evangelical
Baptist	38,662,005	25.3%	American Baptist Churches U.S.A.	Mainline
Pentecostal	13,673,149	8.9%	Assemblies of God	Evangelical
Lutheran	7,860,683	5.1%	Evangelical Lutheran Church in America	Mainline
Lutheran	7,860,683	5.1%	Lutheran Church–Missouri Synod	Evangelical (Confessing Movement and Confessional Church)
Presbyterian/ Reformed	5,844,855	3.8%	Presbyterian Church (U.S.A.)	Mainline
Presbyterian/ Reformed	5,844,855	3.8%	Presbyterian Church in America	Evangelical
Methodist	5,473,129	3.6%	United Methodist Church	Mainline
Methodist	5,473,129	3.6%	Free Methodist Church	Evangelical
Anglican	2,323,100	1.5%	Episcopal Church	Mainline
Anglican	2,323,100	1.5%	Anglican Church in North America	Evangelical (Confessing Movement and Confessional Church)
Adventist	2,203,600	1.4%	Seventh-day Adventist Church	Evangelical
Holiness	2,135,602	1.4%	Church of the Nazarene	Evangelical
Other Groups	1,366,678	0.9%	Church of the Brethren	Evangelical
Other Groups	1,366,678	0.9%	Friends General Conference	Mainline

=== Mainline Protestantism ===
The proportion of Americans who are mainline Protestants has declined by about two-thirds since 1972, and is forecast to further decline with the number of surviving baby boomers.

Mainline Protestant Christian denominations are those Protestant denominations that were brought to the United States by its historic immigrant groups; for this reason they are sometimes referred to as heritage churches. The largest are the Episcopal (English), Presbyterian (Scottish), Methodist (English and Welsh), and Lutheran (German and Scandinavian) churches.

Many mainline denominations teach that the Bible is God's word in function, but tend to be open to new ideas and societal changes. They have been increasingly open to the ordination of women. Mainline churches tend to belong to organizations such as the National Council of Churches and World Council of Churches.

Mainline Protestant denominations, such as the Episcopal Church (76%), the Presbyterian Church (U.S.A.) (64%), and the United Church of Christ (46%), have the highest number of graduate and post-graduate degrees per capita of any other Christian denomination in the United States, as well as the most high-income earners.

Episcopalians and Presbyterians tend to be considerably wealthier and better educated than most other religious groups in Americans, and are disproportionately represented in the upper reaches of American business, law and politics, especially the Republican Party. Numbers of the most wealthy and affluent American families as the Vanderbilts and Astors, Rockefeller, Du Pont, Roosevelt, Forbes, Whitneys, Morgans and Harrimans are Mainline Protestantism families.

List of denominations considered mainline

The seven largest U.S. mainline denominations were called by William Hutchison the "Seven Sisters of American Protestantism." in reference to the major liberal groups during the period between 1900 and 1960.

- United Methodist Church 7,931,733 members (2008)
- Evangelical Lutheran Church in America 4,709,956 members (2008)
- Presbyterian Church (USA) 2,209,546 members (2007)
- Episcopal Church in the United States of America (2008) 2,116,749 members
- American Baptist Churches in the USA 1,358,351 members (2008)
- United Church of Christ 1,145,281 members (2008)
- Christian Church (Disciples of Christ) 691,160 (2008)

The Association of Religion Data Archives also considers these denominations to be mainline:

- Religious Society of Friends (Quakers) 350,000 members
- Reformed Church in America 269,815 members (2005)
- International Council of Community Churches 108,806 members (2005)
- National Association of Congregational Christian Churches 65,569 members (2000)
- North American Baptist Conference 64,565 members (2002)
- Universal Fellowship of Metropolitan Community Churches 44,000 members (1998)
- Moravian Church in America, Northern Province 24,650 members (2003)
- Moravian Church in America, Southern Province 21,513 members (1991)
- Latvian Evangelical Lutheran Church in America 12,000 members (2007)
- Congregational Christian Churches, (not part of any national CCC body)
- Moravian Church in America, Alaska Province

The Association of Religion Data Archives has difficulties collecting data on traditionally African American denominations. Those churches most likely to be identified as mainline include these Methodist groups:

- African Methodist Episcopal Church
- Christian Methodist Episcopal Church

=== Evangelicalism ===
Evangelicalism is a Protestant Christian movement in which adherents consider its key characteristics to be a belief in the need for personal conversion (or being "born again"), some expression of the gospel in effort, a high regard for Biblical authority and an emphasis on the death and resurrection of Jesus. David Bebbington has termed these four distinctive aspects "conversionism", "activism", "biblicism", and "crucicentrism", saying, "Together they form a quadrilateral of priorities that is the basis of Evangelicalism."

Note that the term "evangelical" does not equal Christian fundamentalism, although the latter is sometimes regarded simply as the most theologically conservative subset of the former. The major differences largely hinge upon views of how to regard and approach scripture ("Theology of Scripture"), as well as construing its broader world-view implications. While most conservative evangelicals believe the label has broadened too much beyond its more limiting traditional distinctives, this trend is nonetheless strong enough to create significant ambiguity in the term. As a result, the dichotomy between "evangelical" vs. "mainline" denominations is increasingly complex (particularly with such innovations as the "emergent church" movement).

The contemporary North American usage of the term is influenced by the evangelical/fundamentalist controversy of the early 20th century. Evangelicalism may sometimes be perceived as the middle ground between the theological liberalism of the mainline denominations and the cultural separatism of fundamentalist Christianity. Evangelicalism has therefore been described as "the third of the leading strands in American Protestantism, straddl[ing] the divide between fundamentalists and liberals." While the North American perception is important to understand the usage of the term, it by no means dominates a wider global view, where the fundamentalist debate was not so influential.

Evangelicals held the view that the modernist and liberal parties in the Protestant churches had surrendered their heritage as evangelicals by accommodating the views and values of the world. At the same time, they criticized their fellow fundamentalists for their separatism and their rejection of the Social Gospel as it had been developed by Protestant activists of the previous century. They charged the modernists with having lost their identity as evangelicals and the fundamentalists with having lost the Christ-like heart of evangelicalism. They argued that the Gospel needed to be reasserted to distinguish it from the innovations of the liberals and the fundamentalists.

They sought allies in denominational churches and liturgical traditions, disregarding views of eschatology and other "non-essentials," and joined also with Trinitarian varieties of Pentecostalism. They believed that in doing so, they were simply re-acquainting Protestantism with its own recent tradition. The movement's aim at the outset was to reclaim the evangelical heritage in their respective churches, not to begin something new; and for this reason, following their separation from fundamentalists, the same movement has been better known merely as "Evangelicalism." By the end of the 20th century, this was the most influential development in American Protestant Christianity.

The National Association of Evangelicals is a U.S. agency which coordinates cooperative ministry for its member denominations.

== Other themes ==
=== Protestantism and American education ===
According to Scientific Elite: Nobel Laureates in the United States by Harriet Zuckerman, a review of American Nobel prizes winners awarded between 1901 and 1972, 72% of American Nobel Prize laureates have identified from Protestant background. Overall, 84.2% of all the Nobel Prizes awarded to Americans in Chemistry, 60% in Medicine, and 58.6% in Physics between 1901 and 1972 were won by Protestants.

Some of the first colleges and universities in America, including Harvard, Yale, Princeton, Columbia, Brown, Dartmouth, Rutgers, Williams, Bowdoin, Middlebury, and Amherst, were founded by Protestants, as were later Carleton, Duke, Oberlin, Beloit, Pomona, Rollins and Colorado College.

== See also ==
- Black church
- Church property disputes in the United States
- Catholic Church in the United States
- Demography of the United States#Religion
- History of Protestantism in the United States
- History of religion in the United States
- Religion in the United States
- Yearbook of American and Canadian Churches
