= Puritan migration to New England (1620–1640) =

Movement of English Puritans to North America

The Puritan migration to New England took place from 1620 to 1640, and declined sharply thereafter. The term "Great Migration" can refer to the migration in the period of English Puritans to the New England Colonies, starting with Plymouth Colony and Massachusetts Bay Colony. They came in family groups rather than as isolated individuals and were mainly motivated by freedom to practice their beliefs. The Migration primarily came from East Anglia, specifically Lincolnshire, where John Cotton's teachings were most received in England.

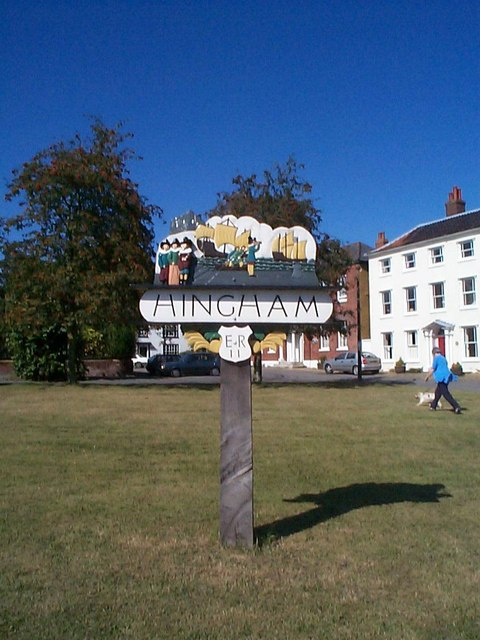
Village sign of Hingham, Norfolk, where Puritans left for Hingham, Massachusetts

== Context ==
King James I and Charles I made some efforts to reconcile the Puritan clergy who had been alienated by the lack of change in the Church of England. Puritans embraced Calvinism (Reformed theology) with its opposition to ritual and an emphasis on preaching, a growing sabbatarianism, and preference for a presbyterian system of church polity, as opposed to the episcopal polity of the Church of England, which had also preserved medieval canon law almost intact. They opposed church practices that resembled Roman Catholic ritual.

This religious conflict worsened after Charles I became king in 1625, and Parliament increasingly opposed his authority. In 1629, Charles dissolved Parliament with no intention of summoning a new one in an ill-fated attempt to neutralize his enemies there, which included numerous Puritans. With the religious and political climate so unpromising, many Puritans decided to leave the country. Some of the migrants were also English expatriate communities of Nonconformists and Separatists from the Dutch Republic who had fled to the European mainland since the 1590s.

The Winthrop Fleet of 1630 included 11 ships led by the flagship Arbella, and it delivered some 700 passengers to the Massachusetts Bay Colony. Migration continued until Parliament was reconvened in 1640, when the scale dropped off sharply. The English Civil War began in 1641, and some colonists returned from New England to England to fight on the Puritan side. Many then remained in England since Oliver Cromwell backed Parliament as an Independent.

The Great Migration saw roughly 20,000 Puritans immigrate to New England. The New England immigrants came from every English county except Westmorland, and nearly half were from East Anglia. This is reflected in many toponyms of New England; for example Boston, Massachusetts is named for Boston, a port city in Lincolnshire. More examples in Massachusetts are Braintree and Dedham, both named after two towns in Essex, respectively.

The colonists to New England were mostly families with some education who were leading relatively prosperous lives in England. One modern writer, however, estimates that 7 to 10 percent of the colonists returned to England after 1640, including about a third of the clergymen.

== Religious societies in New England ==
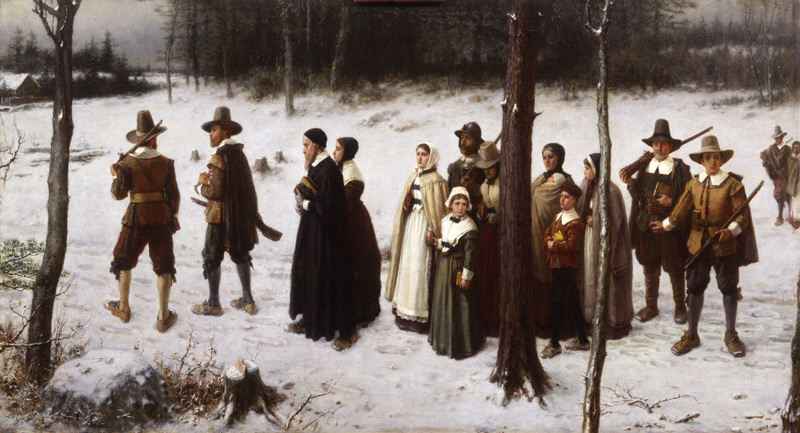
Pilgrims Going to Church, an 1867 portrait by George Henry Boughton

A group of separatist Puritans had fled from England to the Netherlands because they were unhappy with the insufficient reforms of the English church, and to escape persecution. After a few years, however, they began to fear that their children would lose their English identities, so they traveled to the New World in 1620 and established Plymouth Plantation. They and the later wave of Puritan immigrants created a deeply religious, socially tight-knit, and politically innovative culture that is still present within the United States. They hoped that this new land would serve as a "redeemer nation." They fled England and attempted to create a "nation of saints" in America, an intensely religious, thoroughly righteous community designed to be an example for all of Europe and the rest of the world.

Roger Williams preached religious toleration, separation of church and state, and a complete break with the Church of England. He was banished in 1635 from the Massachusetts Bay Colony and founded Providence Plantations, which became the Rhode Island Colony. The Rhode Island Colony provided a haven for Anne Hutchinson, who had been tried and banished from Massachusetts Bay in 1638 for her antinomian beliefs. Quakers were also expelled from Massachusetts, but they were welcomed in Rhode Island. In 1658, a group of Jews were welcomed to settle in Newport; they were fleeing the Inquisition in Spain and Portugal but had not been permitted to settle elsewhere. The Newport congregation is now referred to as Jeshuat Israel and is the second-oldest Jewish congregation in the United States.

== See also ==
- History of Massachusetts
- English Civil War, for further details on King Charles I's conflicts with Parliament.
- Great Migration Study Project
