= Jeremy Bangs =

American historian and author

Bangs In 2018.

Jeremy Dupertuis Bangs (January 20, 1946 – August 26, 2023) was an American-born historian, archivist and scholar, who founded and directed the Leiden Pilgrim Museum. Bangs was known for his research on the Plymouth Colony, authoring eleven books covering early modern Dutch, English and American history.

The son of Carl O. Bangs, a church historian and theology professor, Bangs first studied Art History at the University of Chicago before completing a doctorate at Rijksuniversiteit Leiden. During his tenure at the Leiden Municipal Archives, he began extensive research into the history of the Pilgrims.

After moving to Leiden, Netherlands in 1996, he established the Leiden Pilgrim Museum. In 2018, he was named as a Knight on the Order of Oranje-Nassau by King Willem-Alexander in recognition of his work. He continued his research until his death in 2023.

== Life and career ==
=== Early years ===
Jeremy Dupertuis Bangs was born on January 20, 1946 in Astoria, Oregon, the son of Carl O. Bangs, a church historian and theology professor who taught at Olivet Nazarene College and the Saint Paul School of Theology, and Marjorie Friesen, who was descended from Russian Mennonites and was a member of the American Guild of Organists.

Bangs was raised in Chicago and Missouri. At high school, he was interested in art and history, but as a talented bassoonist, was accepted into the Juilliard School. Despite his musical talent, he decided to study Art History at the University of Chicago. In 1968, he moved to London citing the police brutality of the U.S. summer riots. He moved to The Netherlands the following year, completing a doctorate at Rijksuniversiteit Leiden (1976), with his dissertation on 16th-century Dutch tapestry and church furnishings.

=== Career and research ===
Bangs initially worked at the Leiden Municipal Archives, where he developed an interest in the history of the Pilgrims. In 1986, he became Visiting Distinguished Professor of Art History at Arizona State University.

He also served as the Chief Curator at Plimouth Plantation (1986–1991), Visiting Curator of MSS at Pilgrim Hall Museum, and Assistant Archivist at Scituate Town Archives (1993–1996). After returning to Leiden in the Netherlands with his wife Tommie Flynn, in 1996 Bangs decided to move there permanently.

=== Leiden American Pilgrim Museum ===
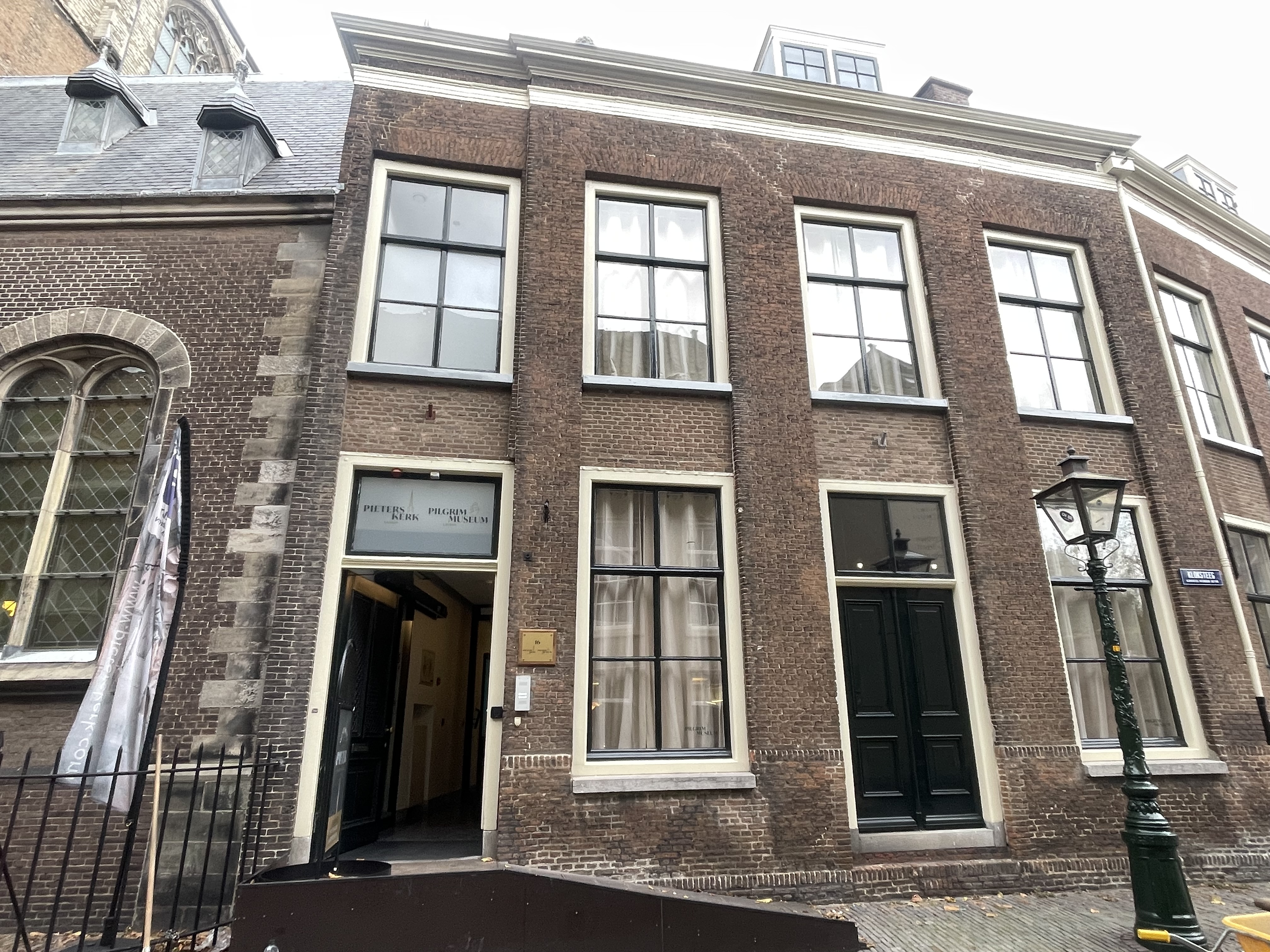
The Pilgrim Museum Leiden (Kloksteeg, Leiden)

On Thanksgiving Day 1997, Bangs established the Leiden American Pilgrim Museum, on the ground floor of the city's oldest townhouse, built c.1370. The museum reportedly saw more than 2,000 visitors every year.

In December 1998, The New York Times reported that the Dutch government had ordered Bangs to repatriate himself to the U.S. during widespread arrests on unauthorised migrants.

In October 2000, Bangs was invited to the annual Leiden Ontzet feasts, to commemorate the end of the 1574 Siege of Leiden. He asserted that the Pilgrims had adopted this tradition in the New World, originating from a Dutch Calvinist philosophy of 'rejecting the fixed medieval ecclesiastical calendar in favour of holy days'.

Further, Bangs has argued that the English Separatists who sailed on The Mayflower had developed a sense of religious tolerance through their persecution, which led them to carry the principle of a separate church and state. His 2009 work, Leiden and the Foundations of Plymouth Plantation, states that, unlike the English Puritans who sought to a establish a theocracy in Massachusetts, Pilgrim colonists were far more tolerant of other faiths, and allowed women to speak in church.

=== Last years ===
In his later years, Bangs suffered from multiple sclerosis, which led him to develop a limp and use a walking cane. Regardless, he continued to run the museum and began directing the Great Migration Study Project, which seeks to catalogue every single emigrant who settled in New England from 1620 to 1640.

New Light on the Old Colony: Plymouth, the Dutch Context of Toleration, and Patterns of Pilgrim Commemoration, his final book, was published in 2019. Following a period of ill health, Bangs died on August 26, 2023.

== Honours ==
Bangs receiving the Order of Oranje-Nassau at King Willem-Alexander's birthday celebrations in Leiden, April 2018.

Bangs was awarded the 2017 Pilgrim Academic Research Award by the General Society of Mayflower Descendants. On April 27, 2018, he was named as a Knight on the Order of Oranje-Nassau. At King Willem-Alexander's birthday celebrations, Henri Lenferink, the mayor of Leiden, presented his knighthood. The civilian title given is 'Ridder'.

The following year, he was honorarily adopted by the Cothutikut Mattakeeset Massachusett tribe, and presented with a wampum belt and blanket in recognition of his work documenting Native American land deeds and titles.

== Publications ==
- Cornelis Engebrechtsz's Leiden (1979)
- The Pilgrims in the Netherlands Recent Research : Papers Presented at a Symposium Held by the Leiden Pilgrim Documents Center and the Sir Thomas Browne Institute (1985)
- Church Art and Architecture in the Low Countries Before 1566 (1997)
- Pilgrim Life in Leiden: Texts and Images from the Leiden American Pilgrim Museum (1997)
- The seventeenth-century town records of Scituate, Massachusetts (1999)
- Indian Deeds: Land Transactions in Plymouth Colony, 1620-1691 (2002)
- Letters on Toleration: Dutch Aid to Persecuted Swiss and Palatine Mennonites 1615-1699 (2004)
- Pilgrim Edward Winslow: New England's First International Diplomat : a Documentary Biography (2004)
- Strangers and Pilgrims, Travellers and Sojourners: Leiden and the Foundations of Plymouth Plantation (2009)
- The Travels of Elkanah Watson: An American Businessman in the Revolutionary War, in 1780s Europe and in the Formative Decades of the United States (2015)
- New Light on the Old Colony: Plymouth, the Dutch Context of Toleration, and Patterns of Pilgrim Commemoration (2019)
