= Pilgrim Museum Leiden =

Coordinates: 52°09′27″N 4°29′18″E

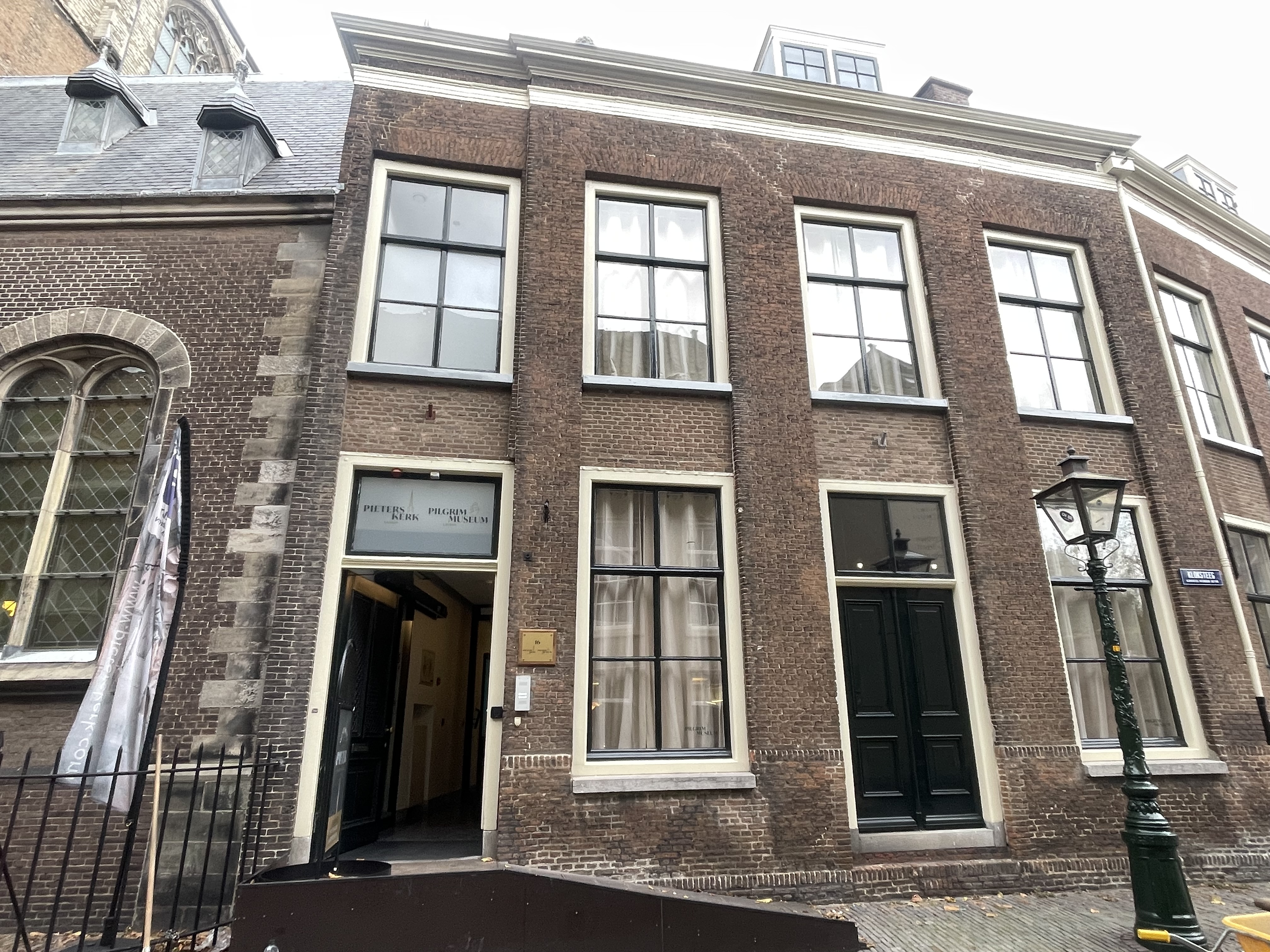
The Pilgrim Museum Leiden (Kloksteeg, Leiden)

The Pilgrim Museum Leiden is a small museum in Leiden, dedicated to the Pilgrims who sailed to the New World on the Mayflower. It was founded in 1997 by American historian Jeremy Bangs.

The Pilgrims were religious refugees who had fled England to Amsterdam in 1608 and moved to Leiden the next year. They lived and worked in that city for about 12 to 20 years. In 1620, they left Leiden by canal, going to Delfshaven where they embarked on the Speedwell, which took them to Southampton. But the Speedwell proved leaky and had to be sold, so they transferred to the Mayflower and undertook the famous voyage to New England. The colonists' first harvest festival after their arrival at Plymouth Colony was the origin of the annual Thanksgiving celebration in the United States.

== Description ==
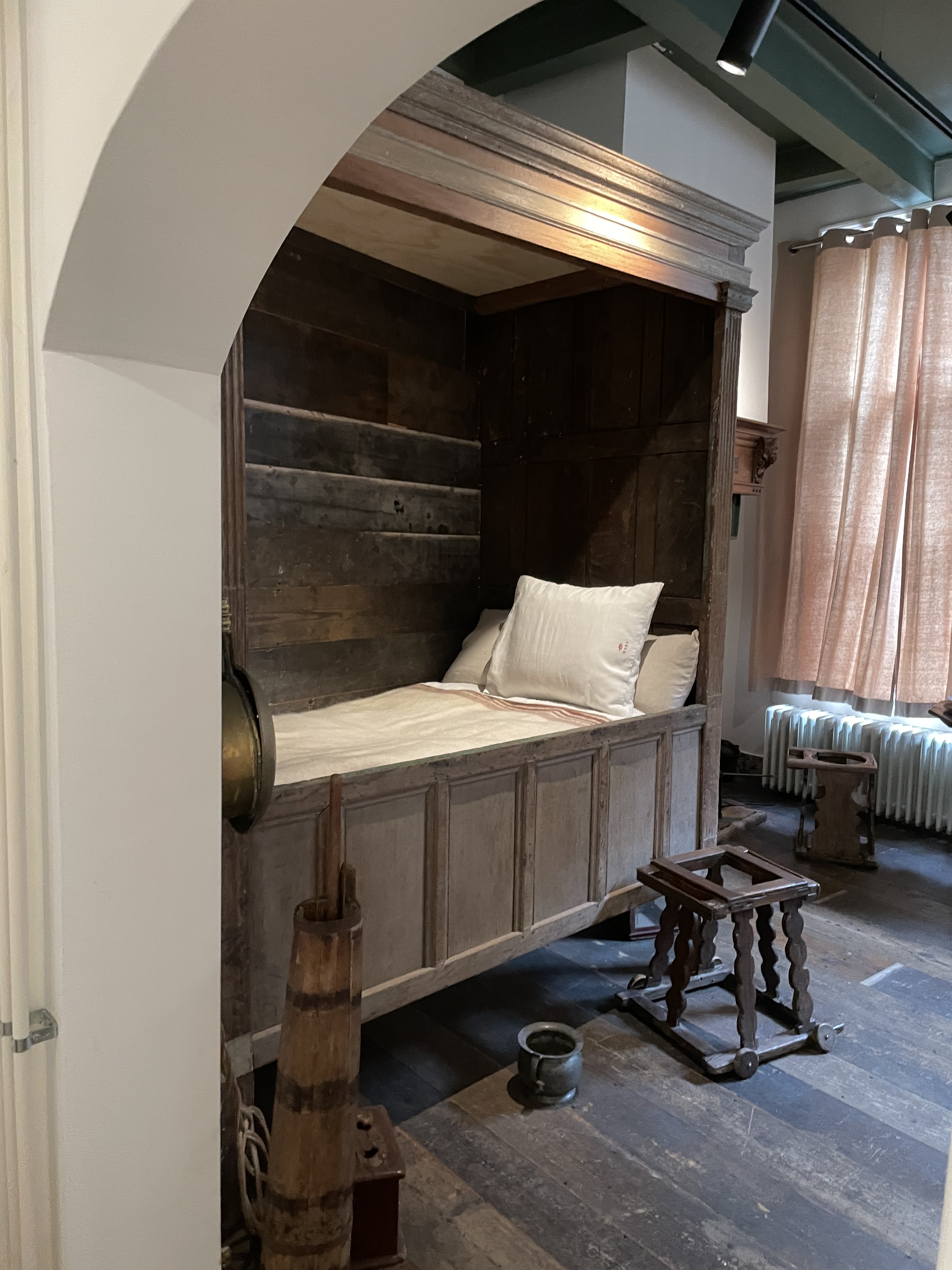
Interior

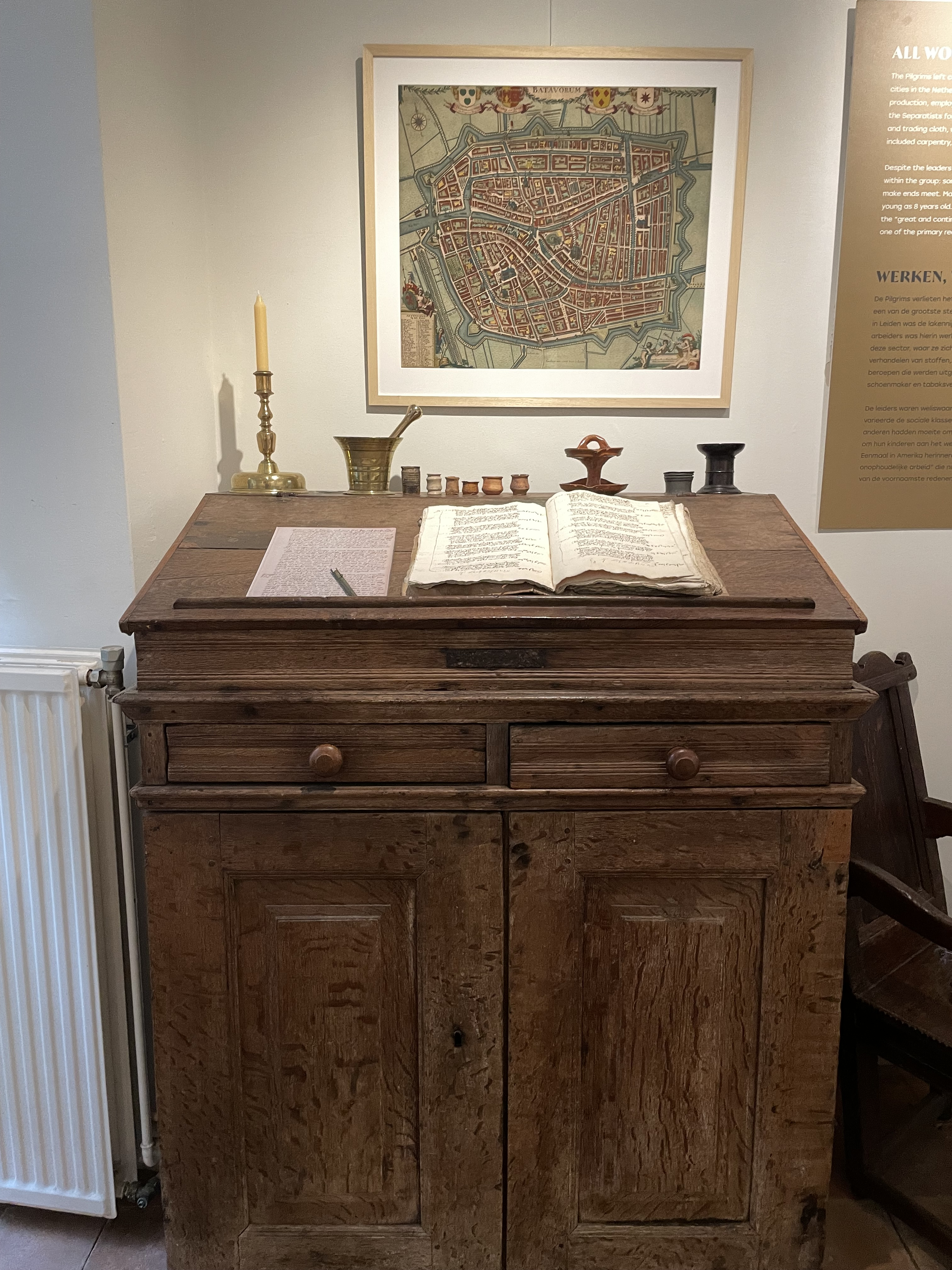
Interior

The Pilgrim Museum Leiden was originally known as the Leiden American Pilgrim Museum and housed in a building dating to about 1365–1370, located at Beschuitsteeg 9, next to the bell tower of the Hooglandse Kerk church. As of October 2025 it is located at Kloksteeg 16a. The museum is operated by the Stichting Pieterskerk Leiden and is open to the public.

The museum presents extensive information about Pilgrim life in Leiden, together with the history of the medieval house itself. A collection of furniture, books, and other material from Pilgrim times illuminates the lives of these people in England, Leiden, and New England. The museum illustrates its Pilgrim narrative with a collection of 16th- and 17th-century maps and engravings by Gerard Mercator, Adriaen Pietersz. van de Venne, and others.

In 2009, the 400th anniversary of the Pilgrims' arrival in Leiden was marked with an exhibition and the publication of the book Strangers and Pilgrims, Travellers and Sojourners – Leiden and the Foundations of Plymouth Plantation. In 2011, the museum coordinated efforts to install a bronze memorial on the ruins of Leiden's Vrouwekerk, commemorating the history of the church and its connections with colonists of Plymouth Colony and New Netherland. The museum has published several books since then, including Plymouth Colony's Private Libraries (2018). Two books mark 2020: New Light on the Old Colony – Plymouth, the Dutch Context of Toleration, and Patterns of Pilgrim Commemoration (Brill), and Intellectual Baggage – The Pilgrims and Plymouth Colony, Ideas of Influence (LAPM, available from Lulu Publishing).

== Other museums ==
The regional archives of Leiden (Regionaal Archief Leiden) maintains a special website section on the Pilgrims under the name Pilgrim Archives Leiden. In Plymouth, Massachusetts, two other museums are dedicated to the Pilgrims, Plimoth Patuxet and the Pilgrim Hall Museum.

== See also ==
- Pieterskerk, Leiden
