= People v. Ruggles =

Historical US lawsuit involving blasphemy

People v. Ruggles 8 Johns. R. 290 (N.Y. 1811) was a landmark case in the State of New York and the first reported blasphemy prosecution in the state.

== Background ==
John Ruggles was arrested and charged with blasphemy after making a blasphemous statement about Christianity in a crowded tavern. The Court of Oyer and Terminer found him guilty and sentenced him to three months in prison and a fine of $500.

== Supreme Court of Judicature ==
The Supreme Court of Judicature upheld the lower court's ruling. The court, led by Chief Justice James Kent, declared that while the state constitution allowed for religious freedom, it did not forbid judicial action against offenses that undermined societal moral obligations. The court emphasized the role of Christian doctrine in public faith, practice, and morals.

== Legacy ==
The decision has had a lasting impact on the interpretation of freedom of religion and the separation of church and state in New York. The case affirmed that blasphemy, as an offense against public decency and morality, was punishable, regardless of the state's stance on religious freedom.
