= Vrouwekerk =

Coordinates: 52°9′39″N 4°29′23″E

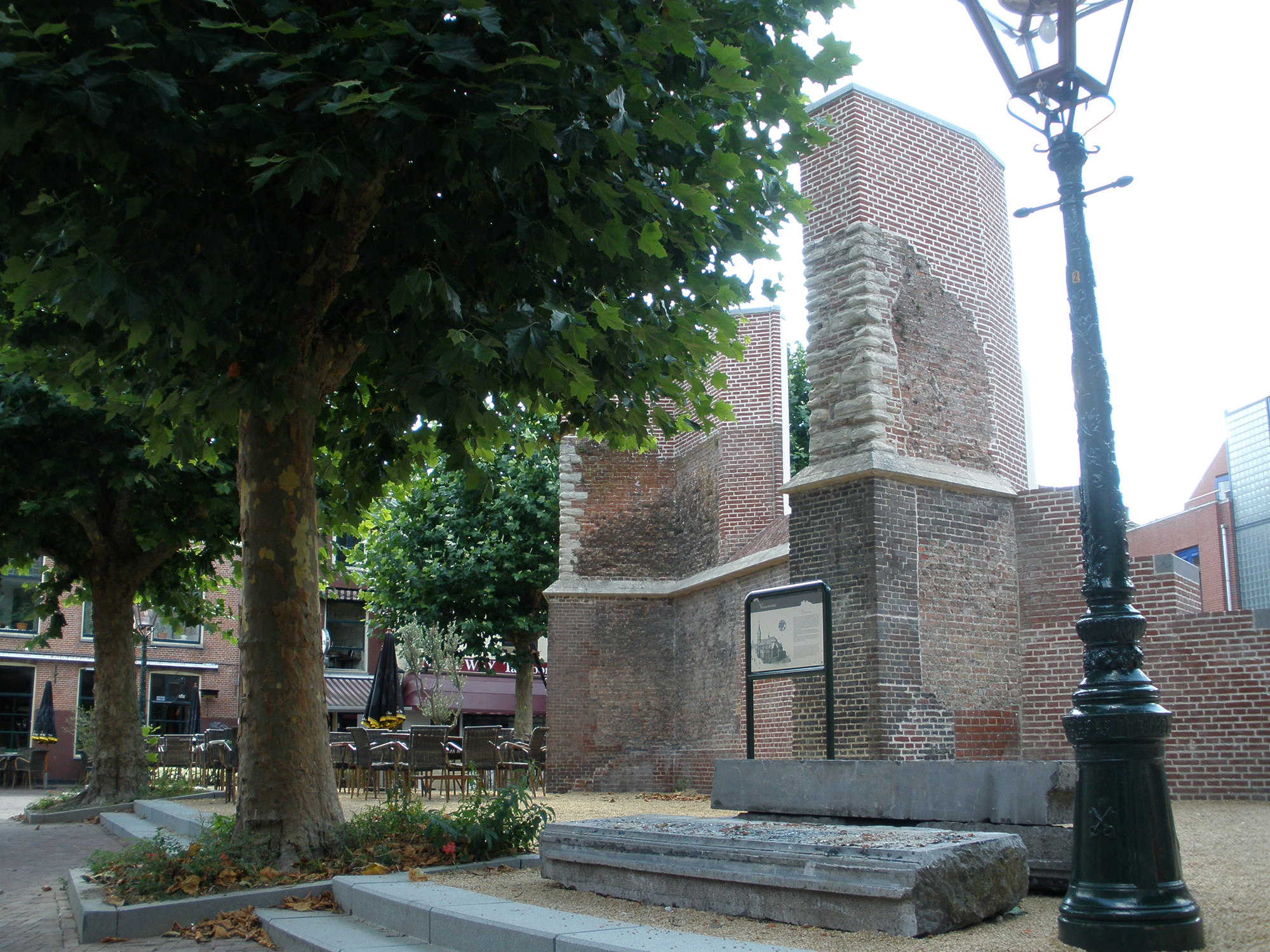
Vrouwenkerkhof square with the remains of the Vrouwekerk

The Vrouwekerk ("Lady's Church") or Vrouwenkerk ("Ladies' Church"), originally known as the Onze-Lieve-Vrouwekerk ("Church of Our Lady"), was a 14th-century church in the Dutch city of Leiden. In the early 17th century, the church was attended by the Pilgrims (who left Leiden to settle in Plymouth Colony) as well as by the first colonists to settle on Manhattan.

The ruined remains of this Gothic church are located on the Vrouwenkerkhof square opposite Museum Boerhaave, just north of the busy shopping street Haarlemmerstraat. The alley Vrouwenkerksteeg, which runs from the Haarlemmerstraat to the Vrouwenkerkhof, is also named after the Vrouwekerk church. The church remains have rijksmonument (national monument) status. In 2008–2009 the church underwent restoration.

Carolus Clusius and Joseph Justus Scaliger were buried in the Vrouwekerk.

== History ==
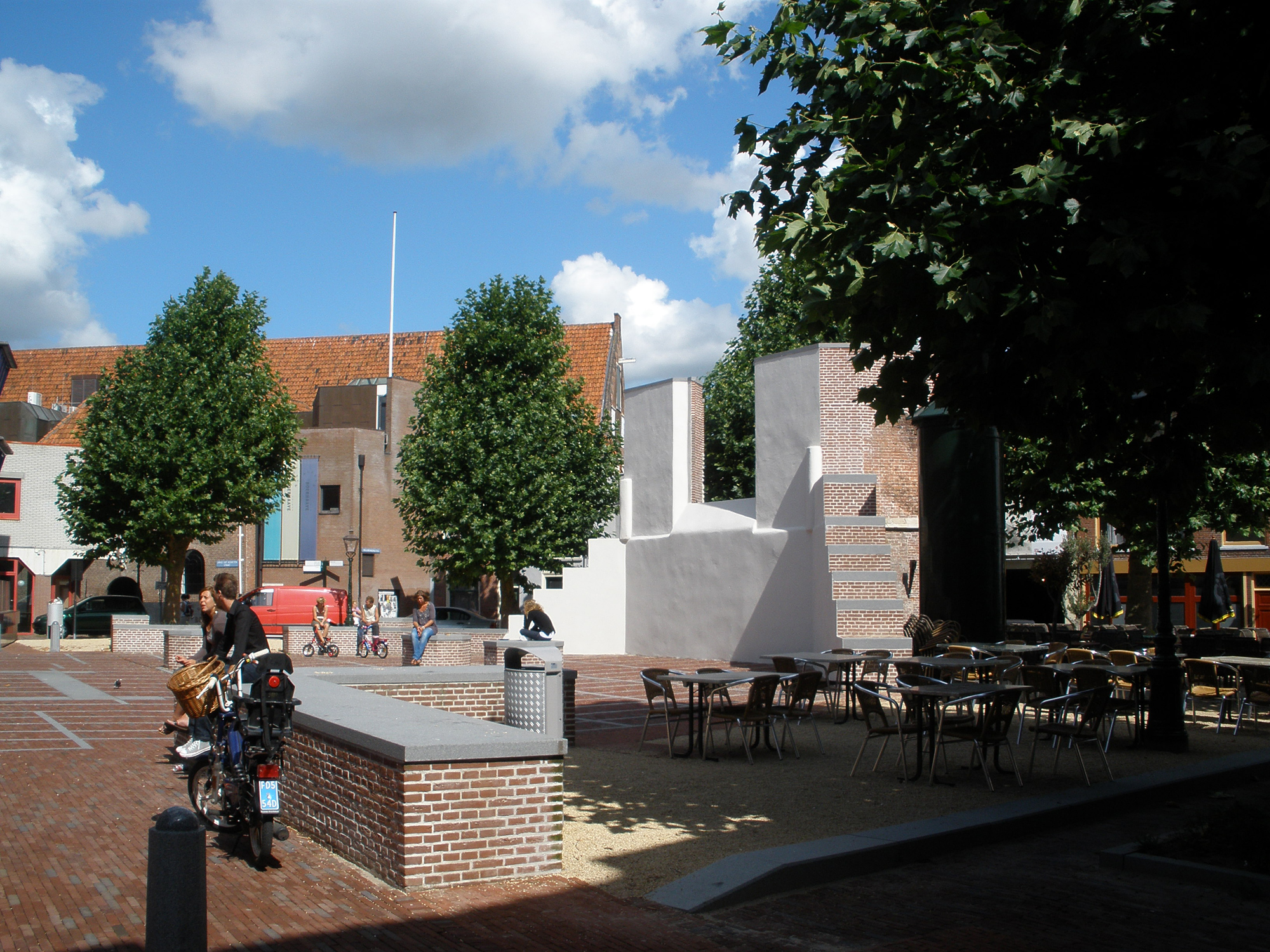
Vrouwenkerkhof square with the remains of the Vrouwekerk

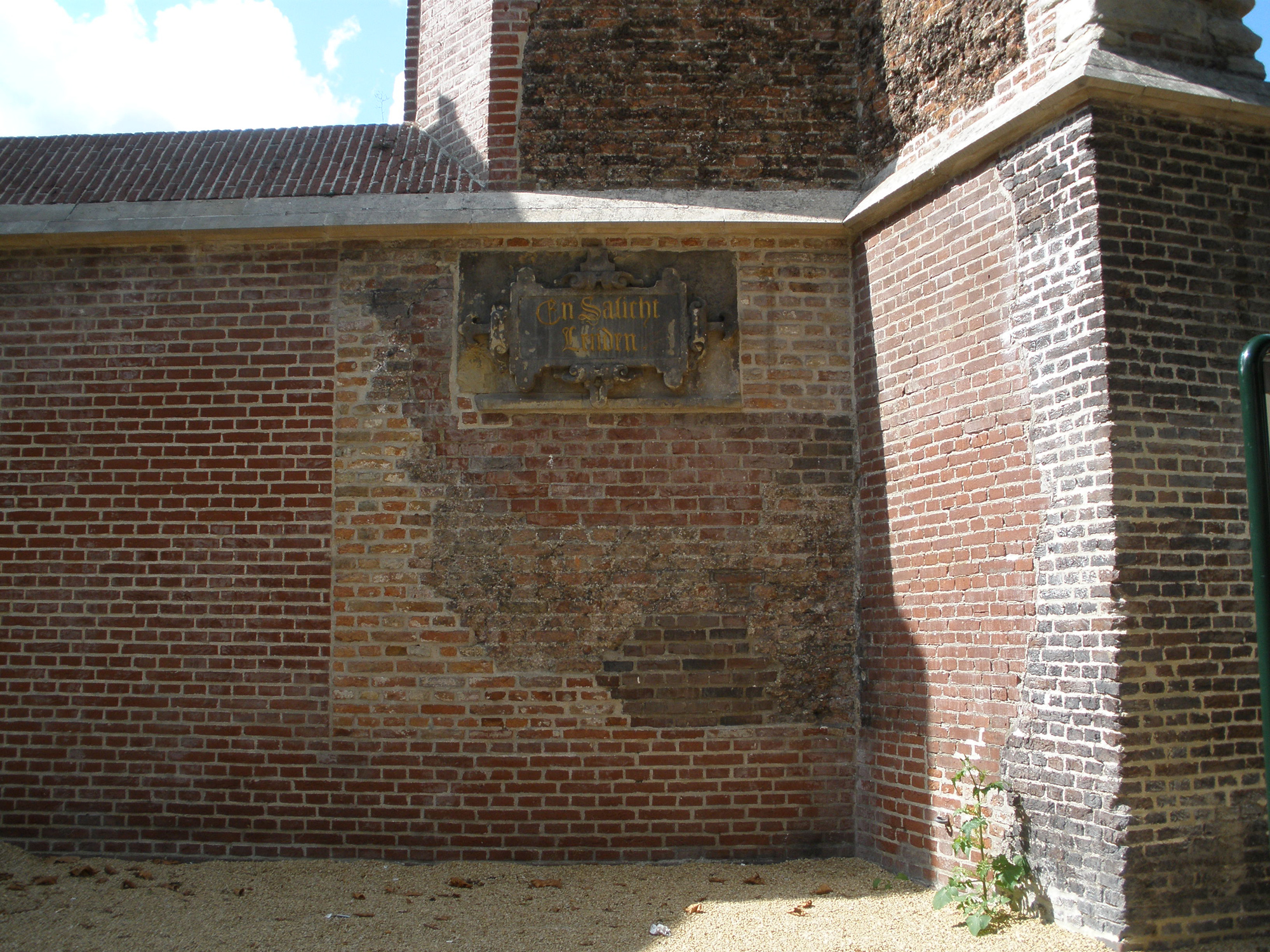
Remains of the Vrouwekerk; note the inscription En Salicht Leiden ("and bless Leiden")

=== Middle Ages ===
Around the year 1300 a chapel devoted to the Virgin Mary was built to the northwest of Leiden, in the hamlet of Maredorp. In 1325 a bridge was built across the Rhine and Leiden expanded across the river to encompass Maredorp. As a result, in the mid-14th century the chapel was enlarged into a stone church called Onze-Lieve-Vrouwekerk ("Church of Our Lady") and in 1365 the church, originally part of the parish of Oegstgeest, became a parish church. The church was further enlarged in 1406 and a walled churchyard was built.

The church contained chapels for various guilds. The chapel of the surgeons' guild, for instance, was devoted to Cosmas and Damian. A triptych painted by Cornelis Engebrechtsz., now in the Kunsthistorisches Museum in Vienna, probably served as altarpiece of this chapel.

Wealthy Leiden brewer Willem van Tetrode (not to be confused with the sculptor of the same name) was buried in the church in 1487. He founded the Stevenshofje in Leiden and was also one of the founders of the Leiden brewers' guild, which had its own chapel in the church.

=== Huguenots and Pilgrims ===
Following the Reformation, the name of the church was shortened to Vrouwekerk because the original name, Onze-Lieve-Vrouwekerk, was considered too Catholic-sounding. The building was donated to the Huguenots (Calvinist refugees from the Southern Netherlands and France), coming into use as a Walloon church in 1584. As greater and greater numbers of religious refugees came to Leiden in the 17th century, the parish grew to some 6,000 members. During services, the church would be so packed that the entire congregation was forced to stand in order to make room for everyone.

Like the Pilgrims, many of these Huguenots later left Leiden for the New World. A group of Leiden Huguenots led by Jessé de Forest were the first to settle on Manhattan, thereby founding New Amsterdam, now New York City.

The Pilgrims did not have their own church building and therefore used the Vrouwekerk and other churches in Leiden for their baptisms, weddings and funerals. In 1603, Philippe de la Noye was baptized in the Vrouwekerk. This Huguenot, born in Leiden in 1602, left for Plymouth Colony in 1621 on board the second Pilgrim ship, the Fortune. De La Noye's aunt, Hester le Mahieu, married the Pilgrim leader Francis Cooke in the Vrouwekerk in 1603. Cooke left for Plymouth on board the Mayflower in 1621; his wife joined him later. Many well-known Americans are descended from Philippe de la Noye (later anglicized to Delano) and Hester le Mahieu and Francis Cooke; these include U.S. presidents Franklin Delano Roosevelt, Ulysses S. Grant, George H. W. Bush and George W. Bush, director Orson Welles, and actor Richard Gere.

=== Demolishment and restoration ===
After a large part of the Huguenot community in Leiden left the city for the New World, the Vrouwekerk started falling apart, so that in 1808 it was no longer possible to hold services there. Eventually the church was sold and largely demolished. In 1837 only the church tower and some of the walls were left standing. In 1840, the tower was also demolished.

Prior to demolishment, the church organ was moved to the former chapel of the St. Catharina Gasthuis, which had become a second Walloon Church at a time when the Vrouwekerk had become too small to accommodate the entire parish community. A number of tombstones were moved to the Pieterskerk church. Some of these were returned to their original location in the Vrouwekerk in 1989.

In the 19th century a school building was constructed on the Vrouwekerk terrain. The school was demolished in 1979. Subsequent archeological research in 1979–1980 revealed that the church foundations, built on wooden poles, were still intact. The archeologists even uncovered remains of the original 14th-century chapel and the foundations of an altar.

In 1982–1983, the church remains were restored. During this restoration, a gate from the sacristy was placed on the inner wall of the choir. In addition, a cartouche with the text En Salicht Leiden ("and bless Leiden"), originally from Leiden's town hall (which was destroyed by fire in 1929), was placed into the eastern outer wall.

Despite the restoration, the church ruins deteriorated into a hangout spot for the local youth, leaving the remains covered in graffiti and soiled with urine. In the 1990s, the city commission on monuments therefore recommended that the remains be removed and replaced with new buildings. The city government in 1995 applied for a permit to redevelop the area, including removal of the above-ground Vrouwekerk remains. This proposal led to protests from the United States, where the church was considered to have important historical significance. A number of organizations in the U.S., including the Roosevelt Institute, Mayflower Society and New York City's historical society, expressed their opposition to the planned demolishment. The Leiden American Pilgrim Museum took the city government to court in an attempt to stop the demolishment.

In 2001, the Leiden city council decided to fund the creation of a Leiden American Pilgrim Museum. At that time, the VVD and CDA factions in the city council introduced an amendment to preserve the Vrouwekerk remains. However, the amendment was withdrawn after opposition from then-alderman Alexander Pechtold.

In 2008–2009, a second restoration took place. The Vrouwekerk's crumbling church walls were heightened by one and a half metres and covered by natural stone. Stone was also used to indicate the contours of the church in the pavement, and to show where the graves within the church were located. After the restoration was complete, a ceremony to mark the occasion was held on 5 March 2009 in nearby Museum Boerhaave.

In 2011 a bronze memorial plaque was unveiled on the Vrouwekerk wall, commemorating the history of the church from medieval times on, and listing the members of the Vrouwekerk congregation who became colonists in Plymouth Colony and New Netherland.
