= Great Migration Study Project =

Scholarly endeavor

The Great Migration Study Project is an ongoing scholarly endeavor to create short biographical sketches of all immigrants from Europe to colonial New England between 1620 and 1640 (the Puritan great migration). These number over 5,000 individuals, not including dependent wives and children, almost all of whom came from England (in a few cases after an interlude in the Netherlands). Originally directed by Jeremy Bangs and then Robert Charles Anderson (until their respective deaths in 2023 and 2025), the project is conducted in collaboration with the New England Historic Genealogical Society and has been underway since 1988.

Publications of the Great Migration Study Project include:

- The Great Migration Begins: Immigrants to New England, 1620–1633 [first series], 3 volumes (NEHGS, 1995). The first phase of the Great Migration Study Project identifies and describes all those Europeans who settled in New England prior to the end of 1633 — over 900 early New England families.
- The Great Migration: Immigrants to New England, 1634–1635 [second series], 7 volumes (NEHGS, 1999–2011). In these two years, approximately 1,300 households (families or unattached individual men and women) arrived in New England. Each volume contains about 200 individual sketches. George Freeman Sanborn and Melinde Lutz Sanborn contributed to the first two volumes of this series.
- The Pilgrim Migration: Immigrants to Plymouth Colony (NEHGS, 2007). The single volume contains over 200 revised sketches on every family or individual known to have resided in Plymouth Colony from the arrival of the Mayflower in 1620 until 1633. ISBN 9780880822046.
- The Winthrop Fleet: Massachusetts Bay Company immigrants to New England, 1629-1630 (NEHGS, 2012). The single volume contains revised sketches of the immigrants who came to the Boston area during the first year of the Massachusetts Bay Colony. ISBN 9780880822824.
- The great migration directory: immigrants to New England, 1620-1640: a concise compendium (NEHGS, 2015). This is a list of all known immigrants during the entire project period, with their year of migration, first residence, origin in England (if known), and references to sources of further information. ISBN 9780880823272.
- The Great Migration Newsletter (NEHGS, 2017). The newsletter was published from 1990 to 2016. All newsletter issues are combined in this single volume. Articles complement the individual Great Migration sketches and examine the broad issues in understanding the lives and times of New England's settlers. Article topics include the settlement of early New England towns, migration patterns, 17th-century passenger lists, church records, land records, and more. ISBN 9780880823678.
- Puritan pedigrees: the deep roots of the great migration to New England (NEHGS, 2019). This book focuses on the Puritan ministers who led the Great Migration and shows their social and familial connections going back several generations in England. ISBN 9780880823845.
- Great Migration Parish Map. This map shows the parishes of origin for those Great Migration immigrants whose background in England is known.
