= Church property disputes in the United States =

Church property disputes in the United States arise when a disagreement amongst a church congregation or between a congregation and its national denomination results in a legal dispute over the control of the congregation's property. Litigation over the property requires conformance with the First Amendment of the United States Constitution which protects the autonomy of churches. Therefore, church property is treated differently than any other type of property by courts of law.

== Legal jurisprudence and history ==
=== Legal approaches used by state courts ===
The First Amendment requires courts adjudicating church property disputes to do so without interpreting any religious doctrine. As a result, courts in the United States have developed two separate legal approaches to handle such disputes.

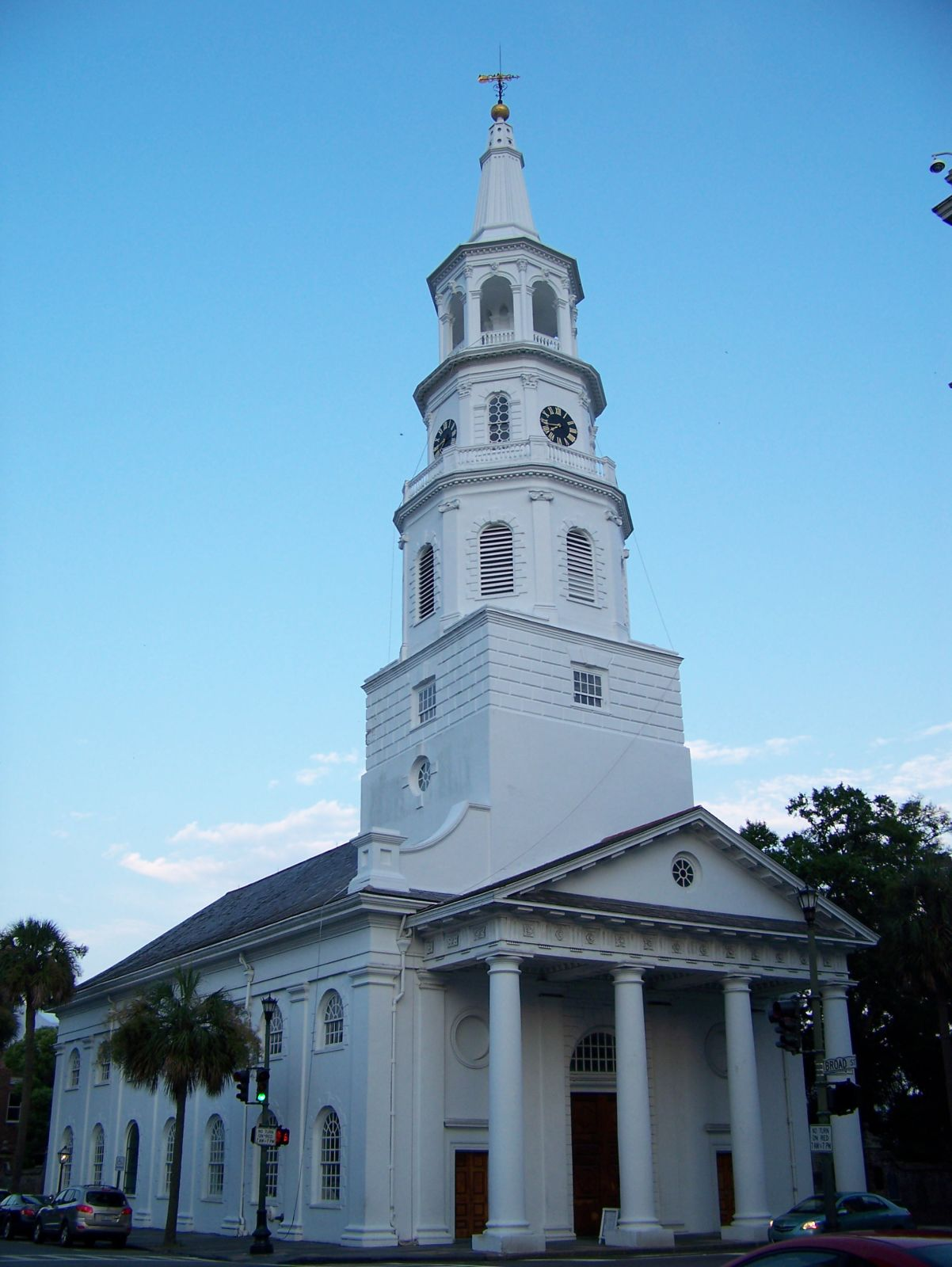
St. Michael's Episcopal Church was one of 29 Episcopal parishes involved in church property disputes after the parishes broke away in the late 2000s to form the Anglican Diocese of South Carolina.

The current legal framework that the majority of courts use is called the Neutral Principles approach. The Neutral Principles approach allows courts to adjudicate church property by deferring to unambiguous legal documents such as deeds, church constitutions, charters, and trusts or by looking entirely to the structure of church governance. However, because courts cannot interpret religious doctrine, the once common "English rule," that the congregation or denomination who most aligns with the denomination's traditional doctrine be given the property, is unconstitutional.

Some state courts use the deference to hierarchy approach, meaning the state courts defer to the highest hierarchical body within the church's decision on the matter.

Legal scholars have criticized the efficacy of both approaches. In 2021, petitions for certiorari asking the U.S. Supreme Court to address the split in approaches were denied.

=== History ===
Church property disputes in the United States have arisen in many contexts but often arise due to social conflict. For instance, the first seminal Supreme Court case on the issue, Watson v. Jones (1872) involved a Presbyterian congregation that split into two groups over some members support of slavery. Watson v. Jones was the first U.S. Supreme Court case handling a church property dispute.

The next seminal Supreme Court case, Presbyterian Church in the United States v. Mary Elizabeth Blue Hull Memorial Presbyterian Church (1969) involved a split from the Presbyterian Church in the United States by two Georgian congregations over the main denomination's support for the ordination of women as ministers and its support for the Civil rights movement.

Finally, in the late 2000s, property disputes arose when congregations split from the Episcopal Church (United States) after the national denomination approved the election of a gay bishop in New Hampshire. Courts using the neutral principles approach have grappled with the legal significance of the Dennis Canon, a rule adopted by the national church in 1979 stating that the property of each local congregation was held in trust for the national church.
