= Pilgrims Going to Church =

Painting by George Henry Boughton

Pilgrims Going To Church
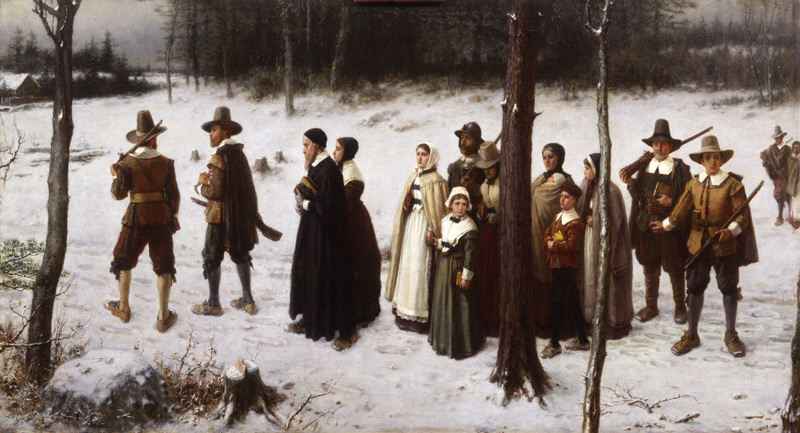
- Artist: George Henry Boughton
- Year: 1867
- Medium: Oil on canvas
- Dimensions: 73.7 cm × 132.1 cm (29 in × 52 in)
- Location: The Robert L. Stuart Collection, New-York Historical Society (on permanent loan from the New York Public Library); New York City, U.S.

Pilgrims Going To Church (1867), originally The Early Puritans of New England Going to Church, is a painting by Anglo-American painter George Henry Boughton (1833–1905).

== Description ==
The winter scene depicts the 17th-century Puritan settlers of New England, later identified specifically as the Pilgrim Fathers, as a small armed group of somberly clad, God-fearing souls making their way from right to left through a snowy, recently cleared wood to a house of worship (a small building visible in the left background). A minister and his wife lead about a half dozen women and children towards the church and are themselves led and flanked by grim looking men with muskets. The influence of the peasant procession paintings of French artist Jules Bastien-Lepage (1848–1884) is evident. The outer molding of the present frame is thought to be of American manufacture, while the inner liner is English, and incorporates a rosette motif found on the frames of paintings by some of the Pre-Raphaelite artists.

== History ==
Boughton was sometimes known as the "Painter of New England Puritanism". As with some of his other works, Pilgrims took inspiration from a literary source: William Henry Bartlett’s 1853 history, The Pilgrim Fathers. It was exhibited at the London Royal Academy in the Summer Exhibition of 1867, receiving a warm reception, and at the Centennial Exposition in Philadelphia in 1876. It was purchased in 1868 by Robert L. Stuart.

The painting was a favorite of a young Vincent van Gogh when he was in London in 1873.
