= George Henry Boughton =

British-American painter (1833–1905)

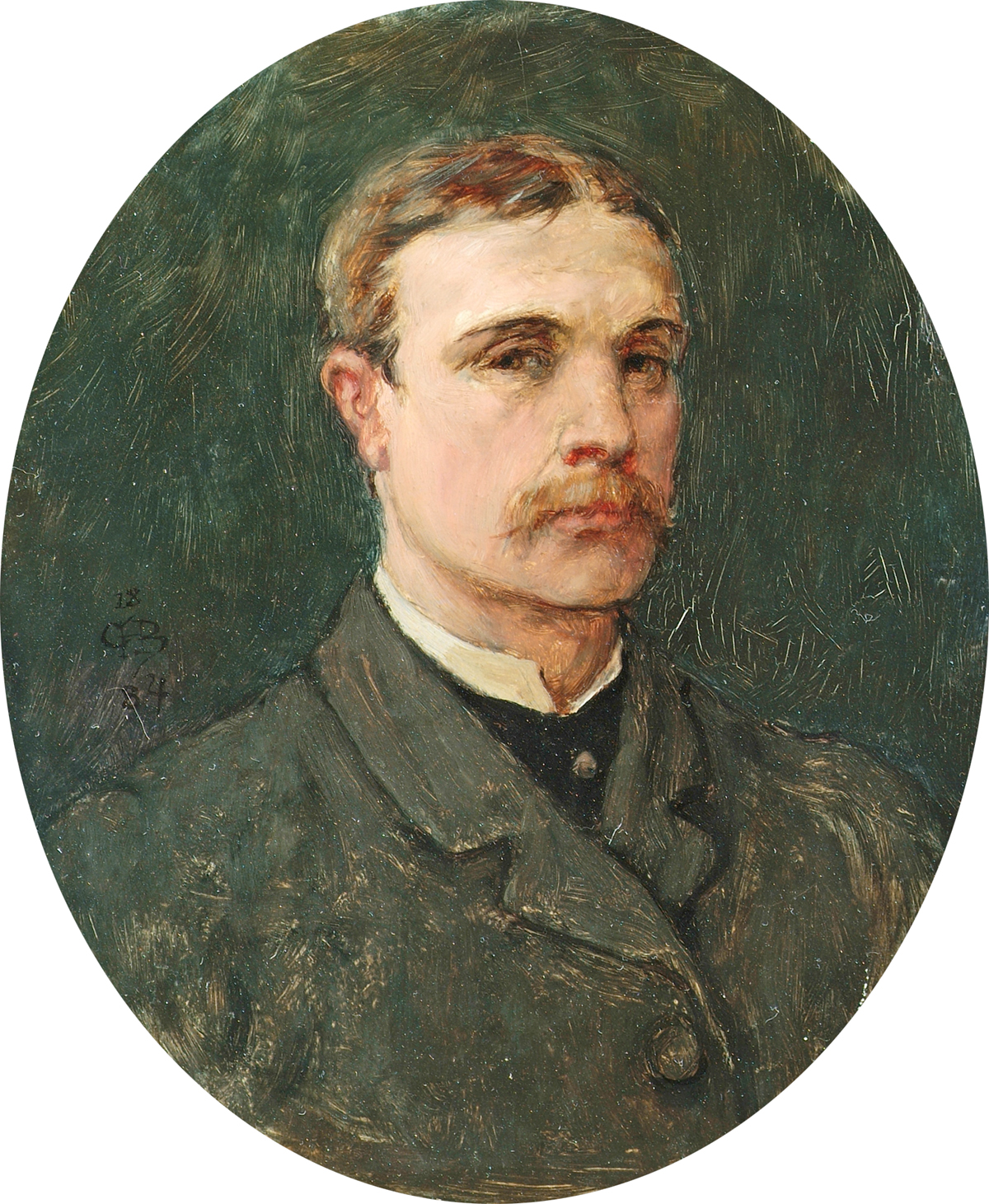
- Self-portrait of Boughton in 1884
- Born: 4 December 1833; Norwich, England
- Died: 19 January 1905 (aged 71); Campden Hill, London, England
- Known for: painting

George Henry Boughton RA (4 December 1833 – 19 January 1905) was an English landscape and genre painter, illustrator, and writer.

He painted in both oils and watercolour, and many of his paintings were turned into prints. He had early success in landscape and historical genre subjects, especially depicting life in Colonial America, and towards the end of the century developed a line of paintings of single figures of attractive young women in outdoors settings, often in vertical formats and sometimes in historical costume, which predominate in his later work. Sentimentality is not always avoided. These and most of his other paintings are rather small.

Born in Norfolk, his family moved to America when he was a toddler, but he returned to England in his 20s, settling in London. He became a popular figure in London artistic circles, and was a friend of John Singer Sargent and James Whistler among others. Perhaps because of this, John Ruskin was rude about his technique, describing it as "executed by a converted crossing sweeper, with his broom, after it was worn stumpy".

== Early life and education ==
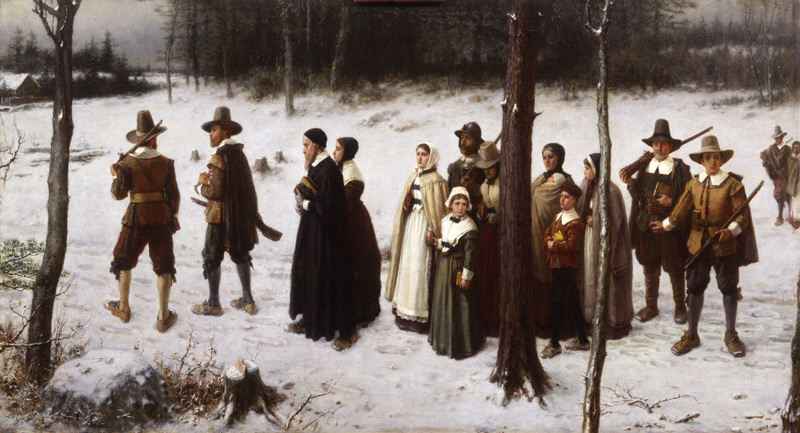
Pilgrims Going to Church, oils, 1867, now New York Historical Society

Boughton was born in Norwich in Norfolk, England, the son of farmer William Boughton. The family immigrated to the United States in 1835, and he grew up in Albany, New York, where he started his career as a self-taught artist. He was influenced by the artists of Hudson River School.

== Career ==
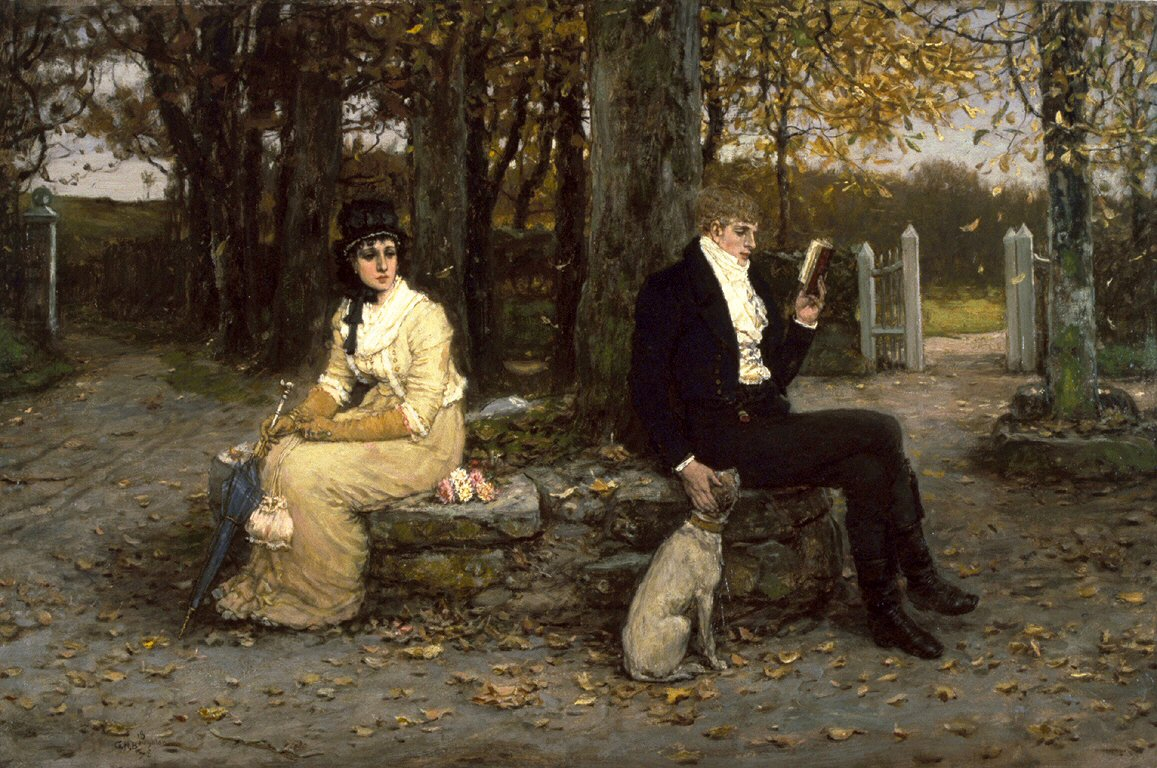
The Waning Honeymoon, oils, 1878, Walters Art Museum

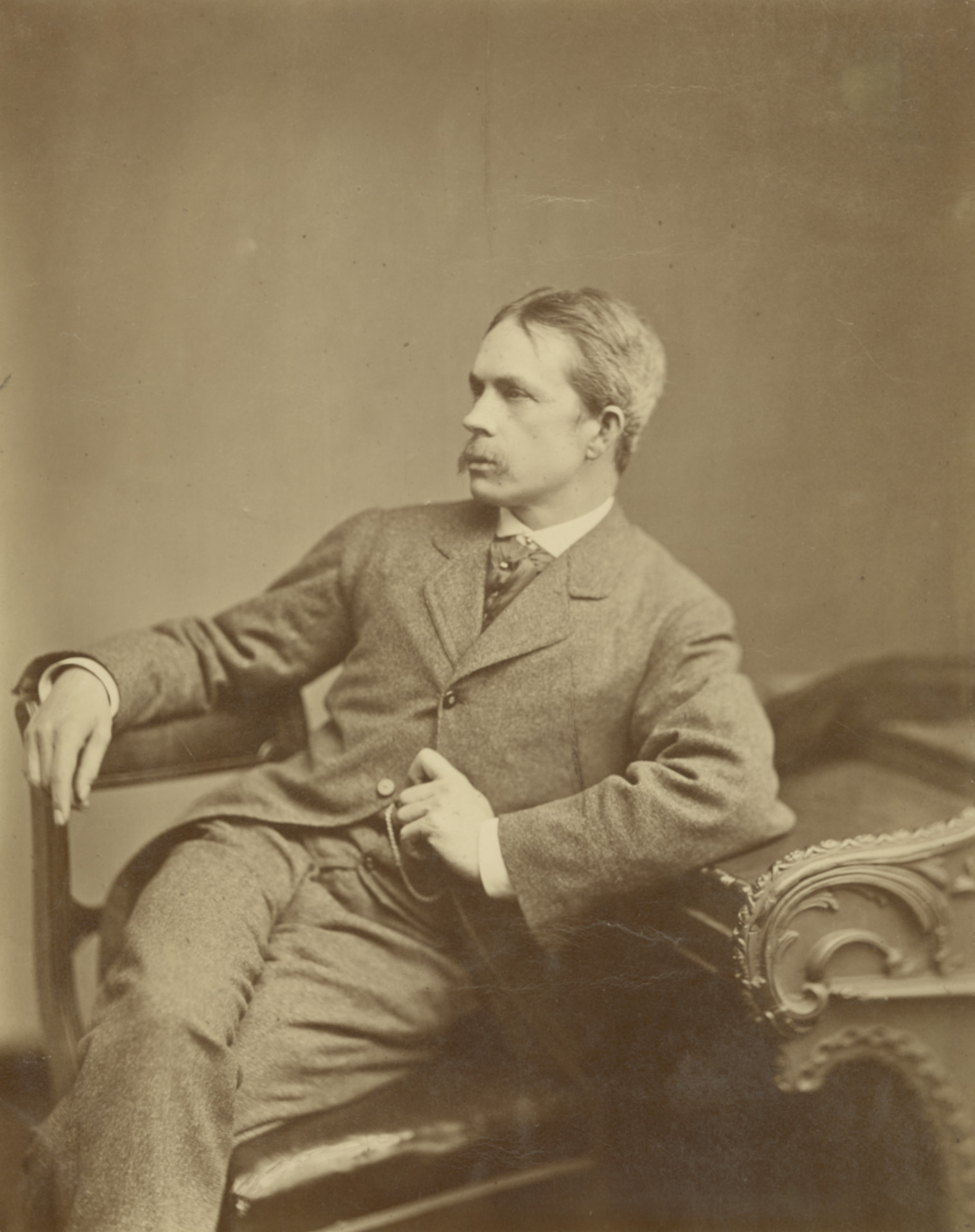
1880s photo

By the age of 19, Boughton was recognized as a landscape painter and opened his first studio in 1852. In 1853, the American Art-Union purchased one of his early pictures which financed six months of studying art in England. He concluded this period of his training with a sketching tour of the Lake District, Scotland, and Ireland.

After returning to the U.S., Boughton exhibited his works in Washington, D.C. and New York City. But in the late 1850s, he decided to move to Europe, where, from 1859 to 1861, he studied art under Pierre Edouard Frère (1819–1886) and Edward Harrison May (1824–1887) in France.

In 1861, Boughton opened a studio in London. While living in England, he focused on subjects of early American colonial history, and an American critic noticed that "for early history of this country his talents seems to be peculiarly fitted." His subject pictures, such as the Early Puritans of New England Going to Church (1867), were especially popular. The Return of the Mayflower (shown at the Goupil Gallery, New York in 1871) was praised as "a picture which will live as long as the memory of the Mayflower itself lasts."

Vincent van Gogh, who lived in London from 1873 to 1875, was impressed by Boughton's painting Godspeed! Pilgrims Setting Out for Canterbury. Then working as a minister, he gave a sermon inspired by the painting, and wrote about it to his brother Theo. The Boughton painting is now part of the collection of the Van Gogh Museum in Amsterdam.

Boughton illustrated Nathaniel Hawthorne’s The Scarlet Letter and Henry Wadsworth Longfellow's poems. In 1893, the edition of Washington Irving’s Rip Van Winkle and Sleepy Hollow was published in London with 53 illustrations by Boughton (see bibliography). A London critic once declared that he "has learnt the secret of putting natural feelings into rustic figures, which has been almost entirely wanting to English painters."

Boughton exhibited extensively in both Britain and the U.S. and was elected a member of the National Academy of Design in New York City in 1871. He was elected a member of the Royal Institute of Painters in Water Colours, an Associate of the Royal Academy (ARA) in 1879, and a Royal Academician (RA) in 1896. "He was a useful and popular member of this body, and worked well as member of the council, as a 'hanger', and as a teacher in the schools." After the death of John Callcott Horsley, Boughton was elected a Director of the "Fine Art and General Insurance Company".

His landscape paintings included views of England and Brittany in France. In 1883, he travelled to Holland, and his illustrated account of that journey was published in the Harper's Magazine as "Artist Strolls in Holland", and published the following year in London as Sketching Rambles in Holland.

Boughton enjoyed writing, and later participated in publishing the "English Art in the Public Galleries of London", which provided an overview of George Morland's biography and work.

Boughton easily socialised in London artistic circles and was a member of the Arts Club (1869–96), of the Reform Club, the Athenaeum Club, the Burlington Fine Arts Club and the Grolier and Lotos Clubs in New York.

== Personal life ==
In 1865, Boughton married Katherine Louise Cullen (1845-after 1901), and they adopted a daughter, Florence. Along with John Callcott Horsley, he was one of the early clients of architect Richard Norman Shaw who built a house for the Boughtons on Campden Hill, London. "The parties given here by Mr and Mrs Boughton were celebrated among artistic and literary people and in the Anglo-American section of the society."

Boughton was influenced by the works of British painter and illustrator Frederick Walker (1840–1875). In the 1870s in London, he met James Whistler. In 1878, an American reviewer praised them as "shining lights in the art world" of London. Boughton published vivid recollections about Whistler, particularly mentioning his work on the famous ‘Peacock Room'. In 1877 he made an acquaintance with Henry James (1843–1916).

The female novelist Violet Hunt (1862–1942) based her novels Their Lives (1916) and Their Hearts (1921) on her early love affair with Boughton. The novel Christina Chard (1894) by Mrs Rosa Campbell-Praed (1851–1935), an Australian novelist, was dedicated to Boughton, because he had suggested the idea of the book.

Throughout the 1880s and 1890s, he was associated with several artistic colonies in countryside, namely with the village of Broadway in Worcestershire, the rustic beauty of which was recognized by American artists. Along with Henry James, Edwin Abbey, John Singer Sargent and others, he frequently visited Broadway. Through Horsley and Shaw he also was associated with the Cranbrook Colony of artists, visiting them in the late 1860s-1880s. Boughton also served as an agent and advisor to Henry Gurdon Marquand, one of the founders of the Metropolitan Museum of Art, and namesake of the Marquand Collection.

== Death ==
Boughton died of heart disease, on 19 January 1905, in his studio at Campden Hill, north London. His obituary stated that "he was kindly, genial, humorous, a lover of a good story, the essence of hospitality, and wholly free from jealousy, malice, and incharitable judgments."

His paintings are now represented in many museums in the United States and Europe.

== Gallery ==
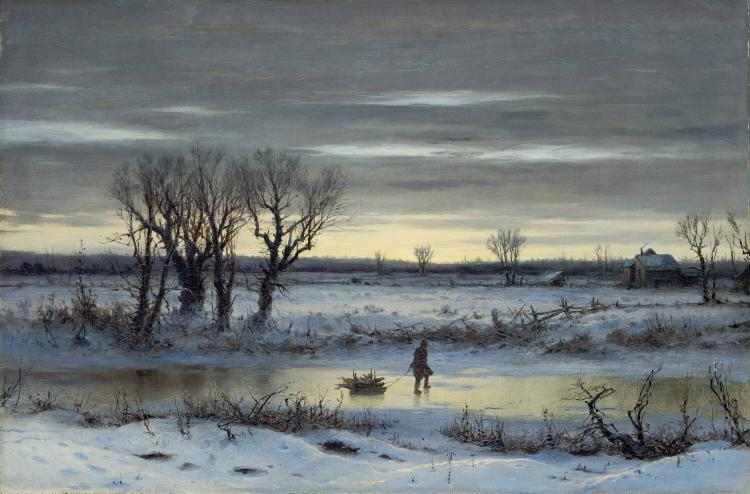
Winter Twilight Near Albany, 1858

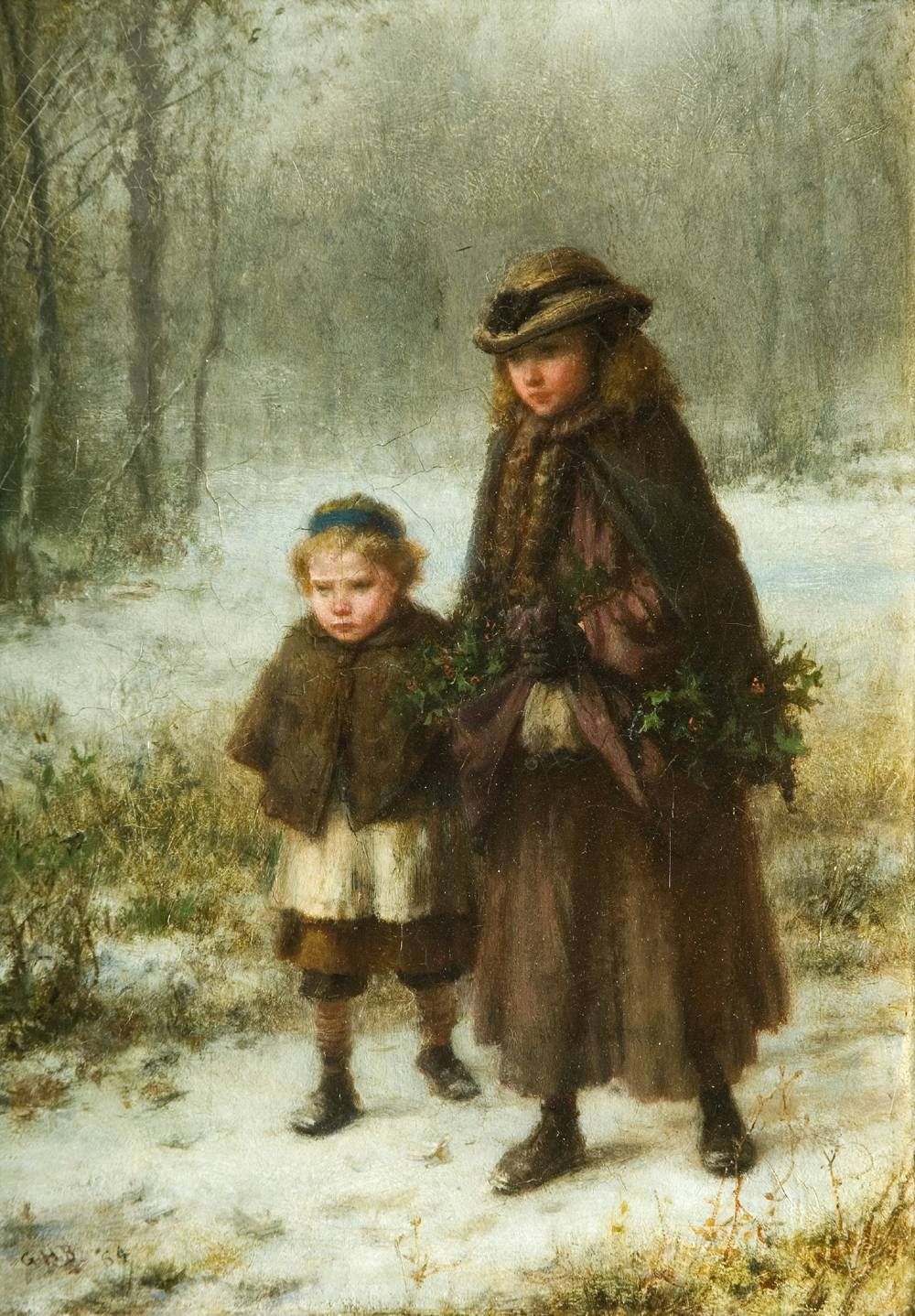
Winter Morning Walk, 1864, Wolverhampton Art Gallery.

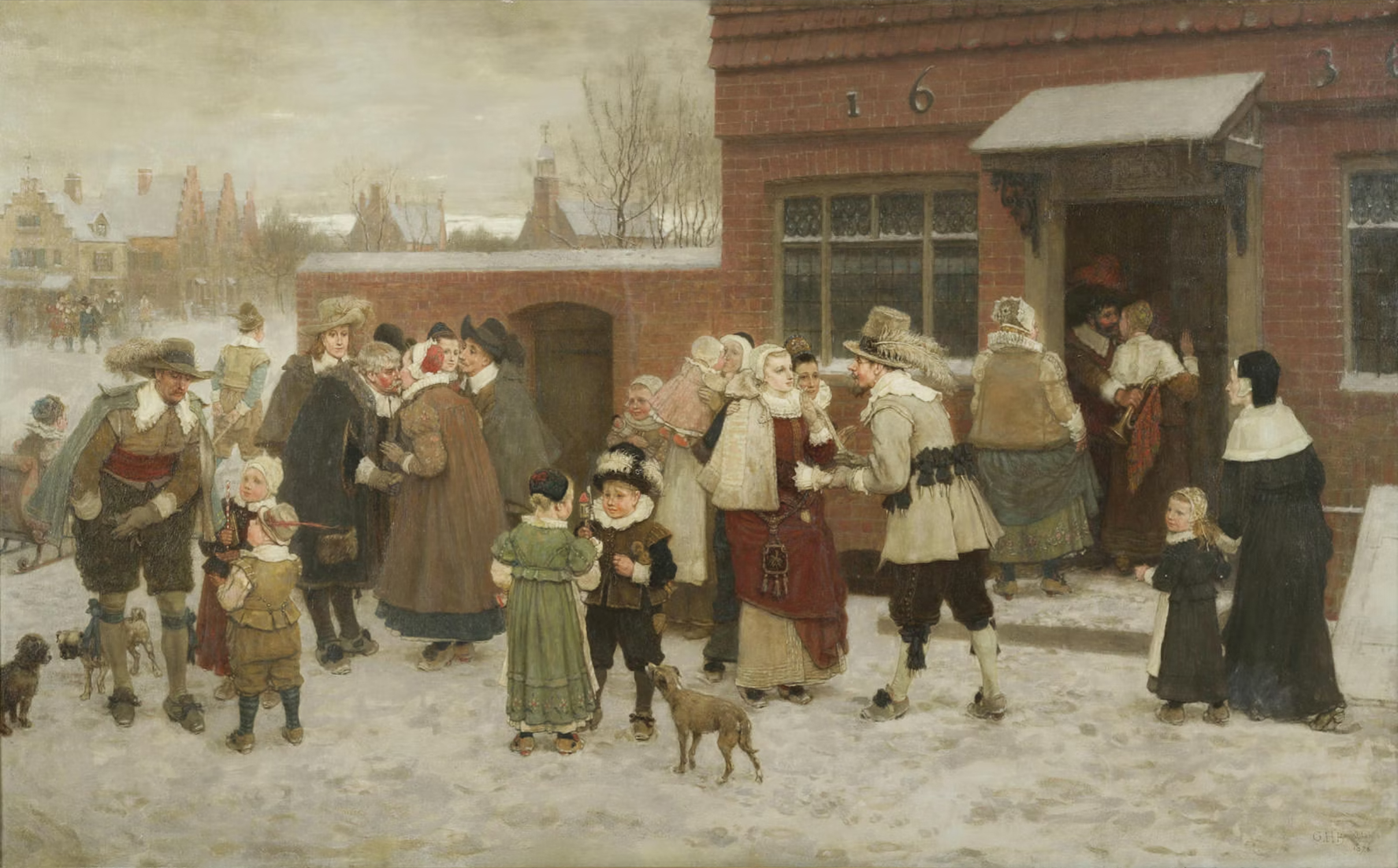
Party For New Year's Day In New Amsterdam (1870)

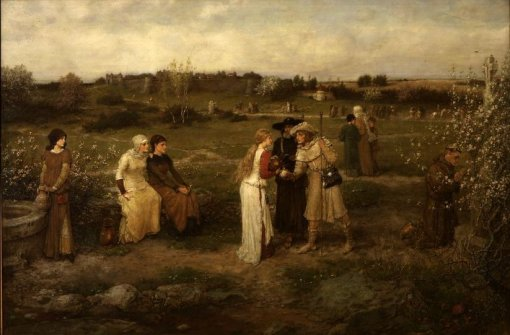
Godspeed! Pilgrims Setting Out for Canterbury (1874), Van Gogh Museum, Amsterdam.

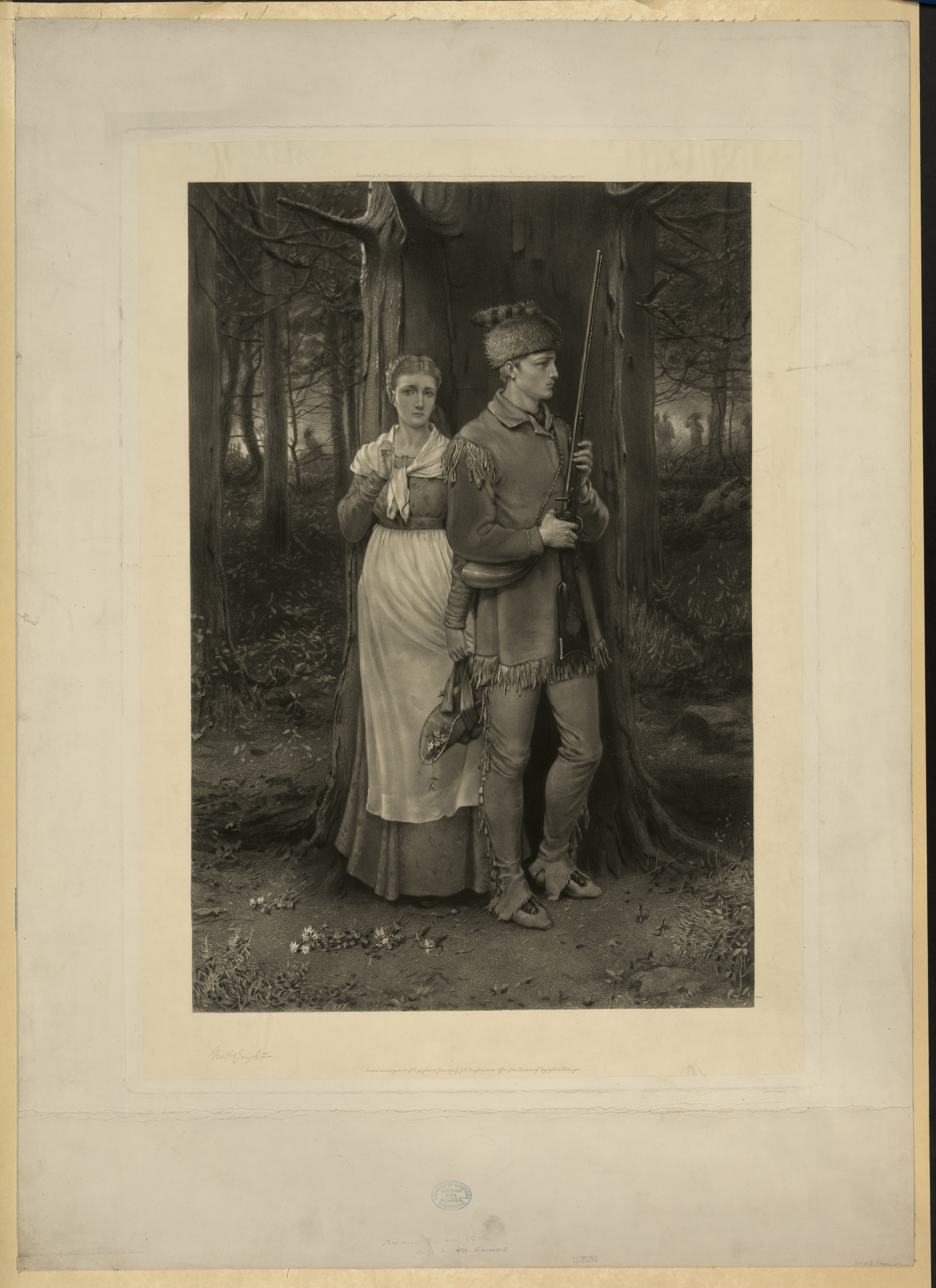
Too near the war path, print after a painting, 1874

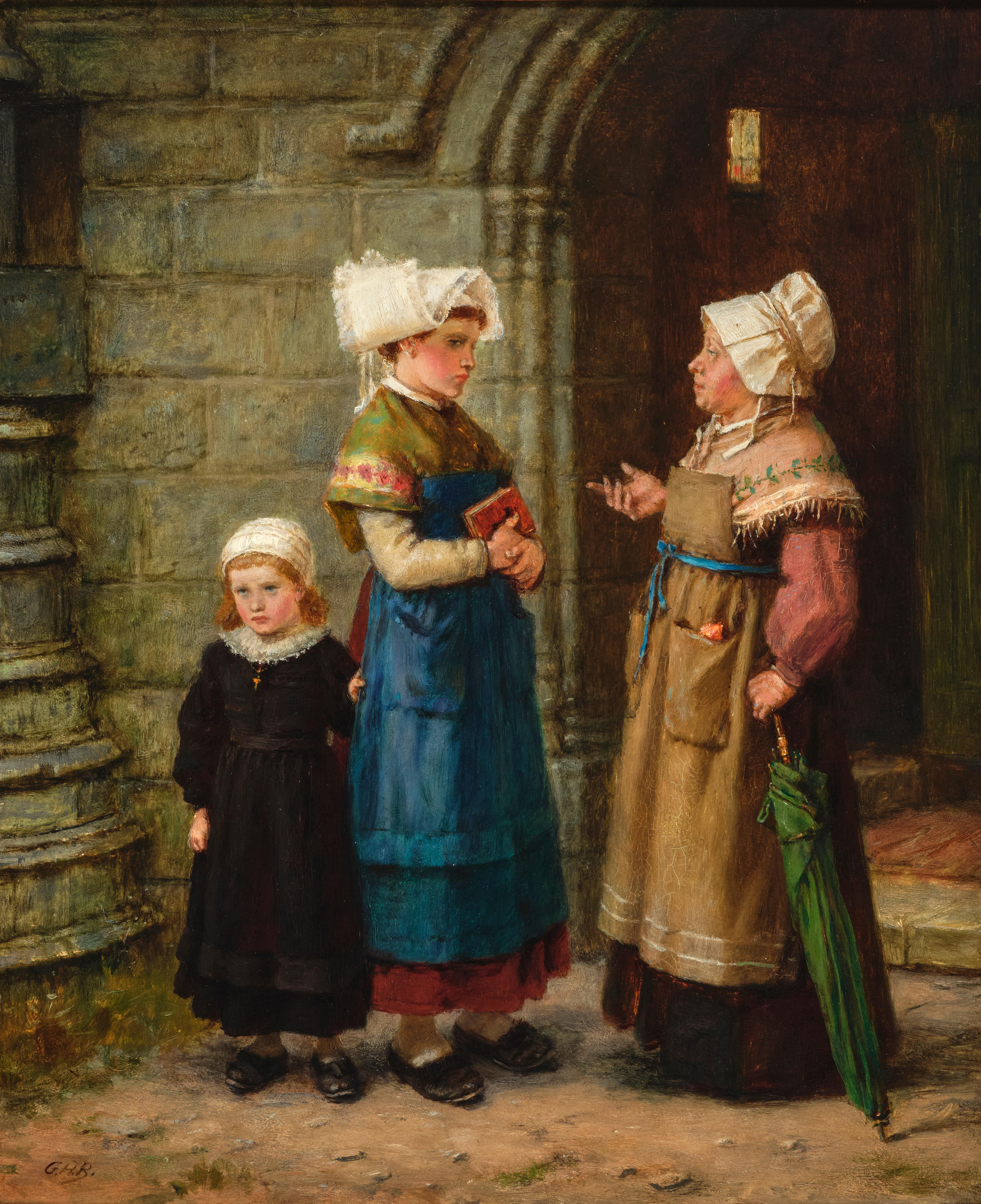
Sunday Mass (probably set in Brittany), oils

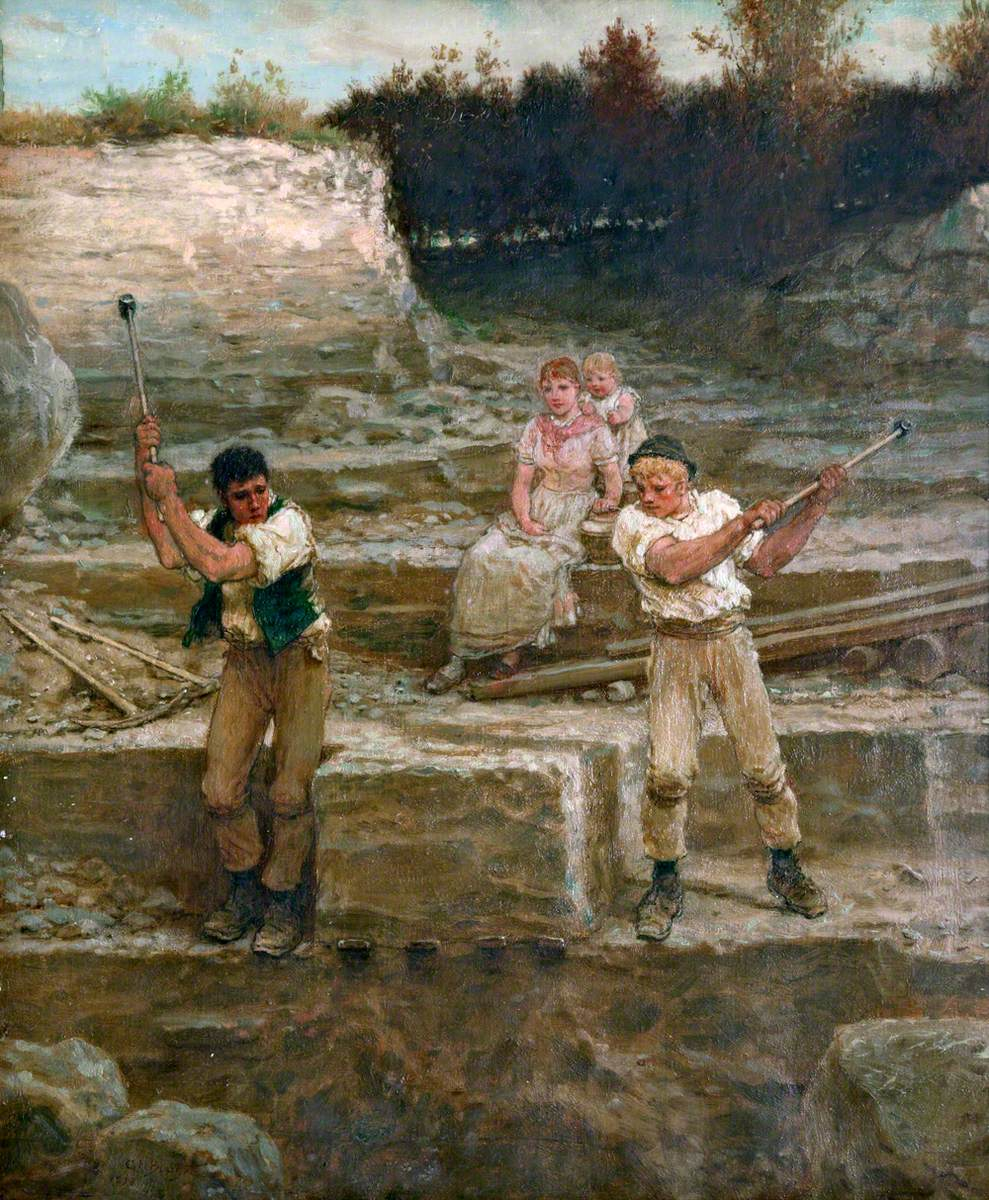
The Miners, 1878, Sudley House

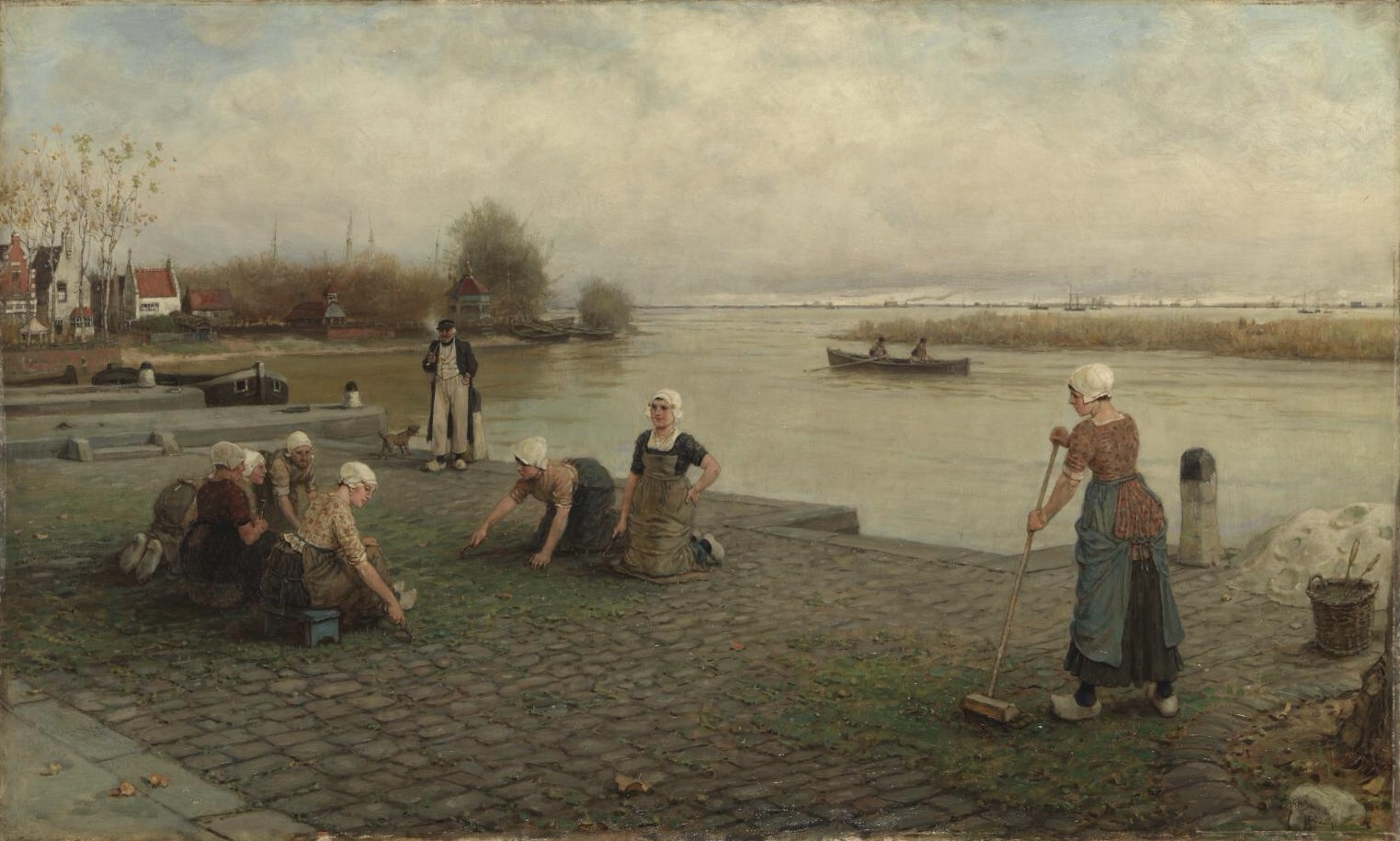
Weeding the Pavement, oils, 1880s, Tate Britain, Dutch setting

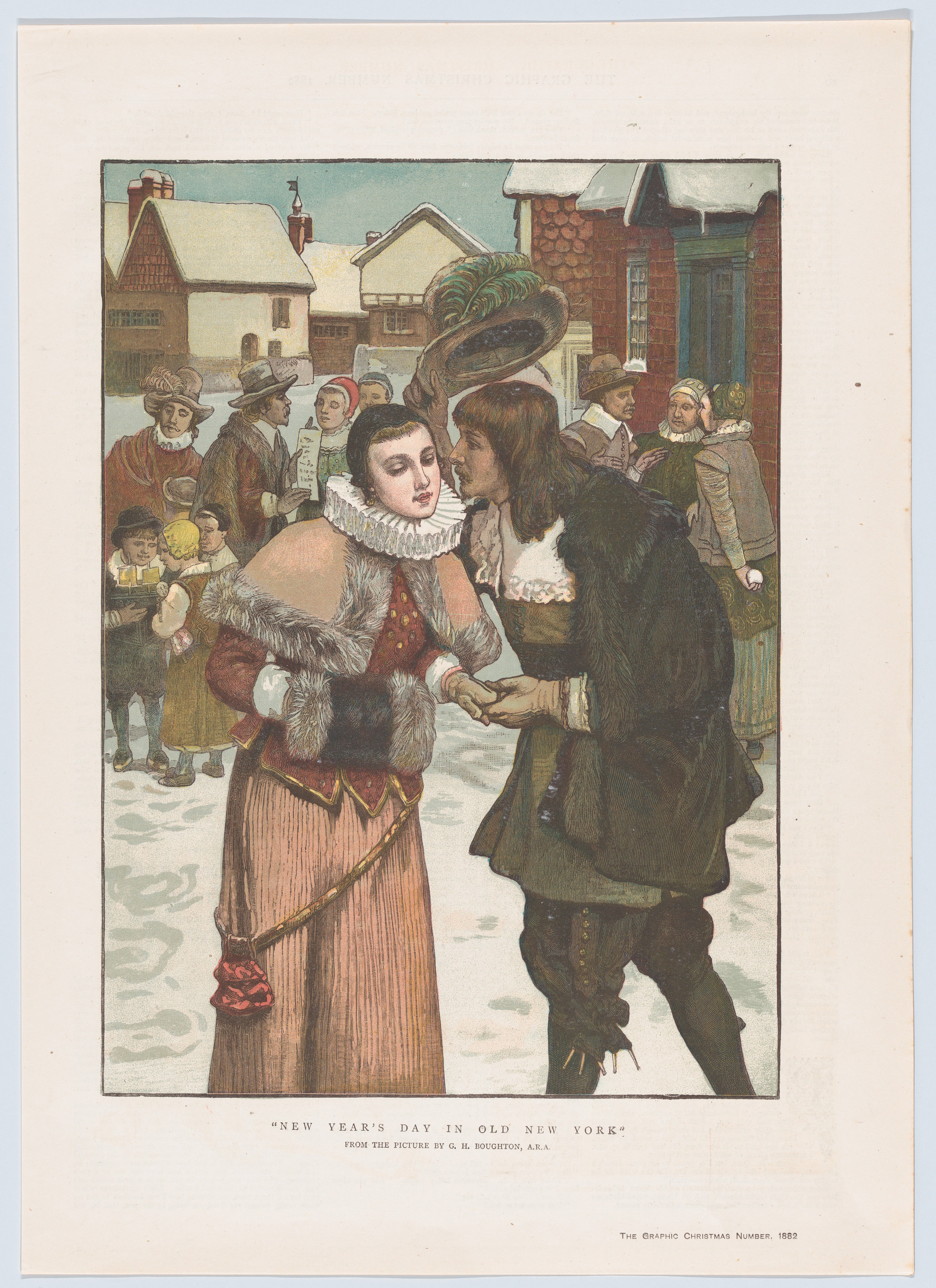
New Year's Day in Old New York print, from the 1882 Christmas Number of "The Graphic"

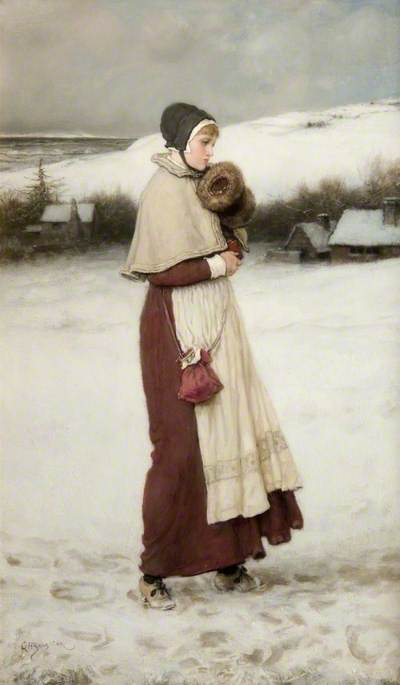
Girl with a Muff, Winter Scene, oils

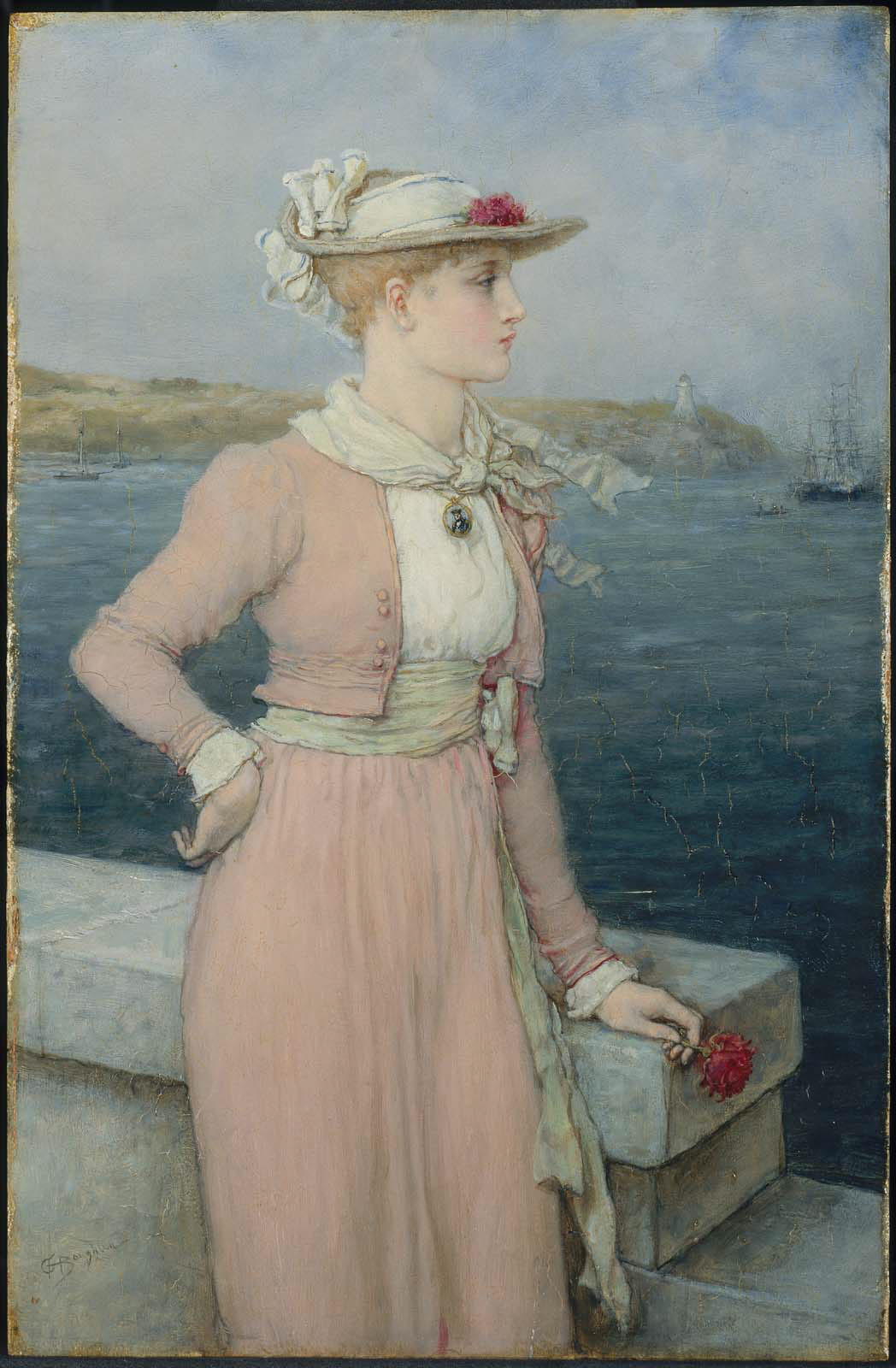
Sea Breeze, c. 1880, Boston MFA. The print of it is titled Forget Me Not.

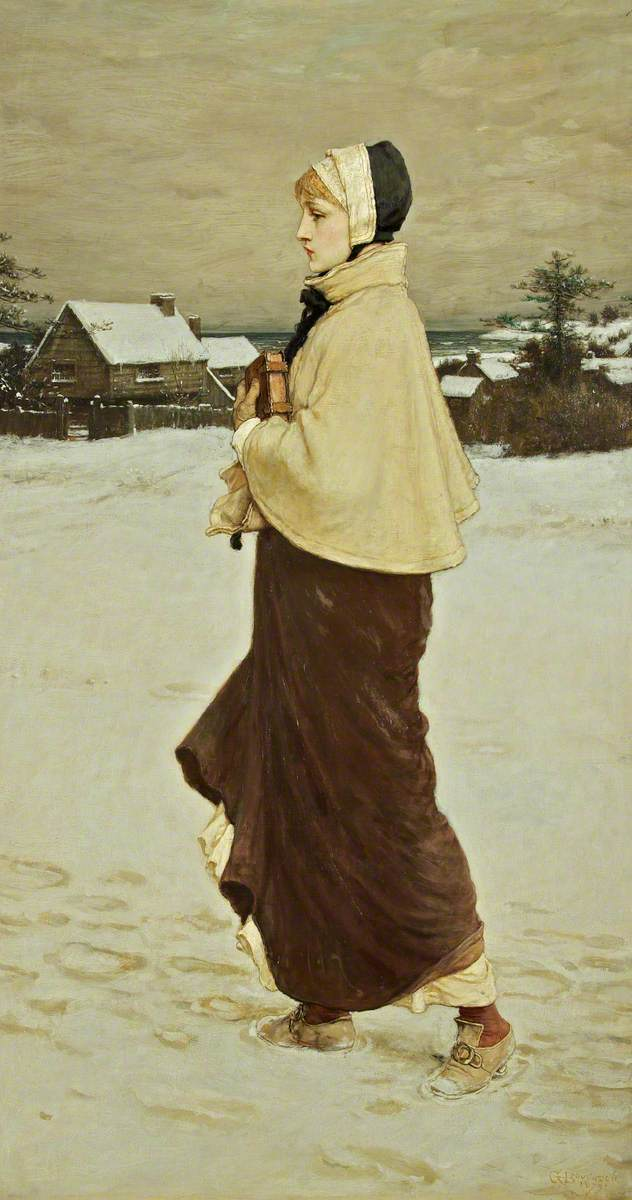
Priscilla, oils, 1879, Bristol City Museum, popular as a print

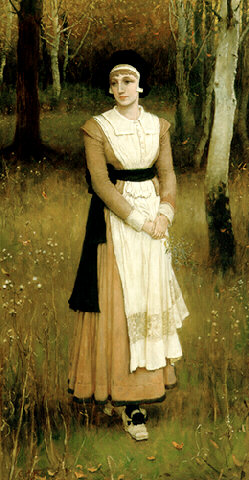
Rose Standish (1891), private collection.

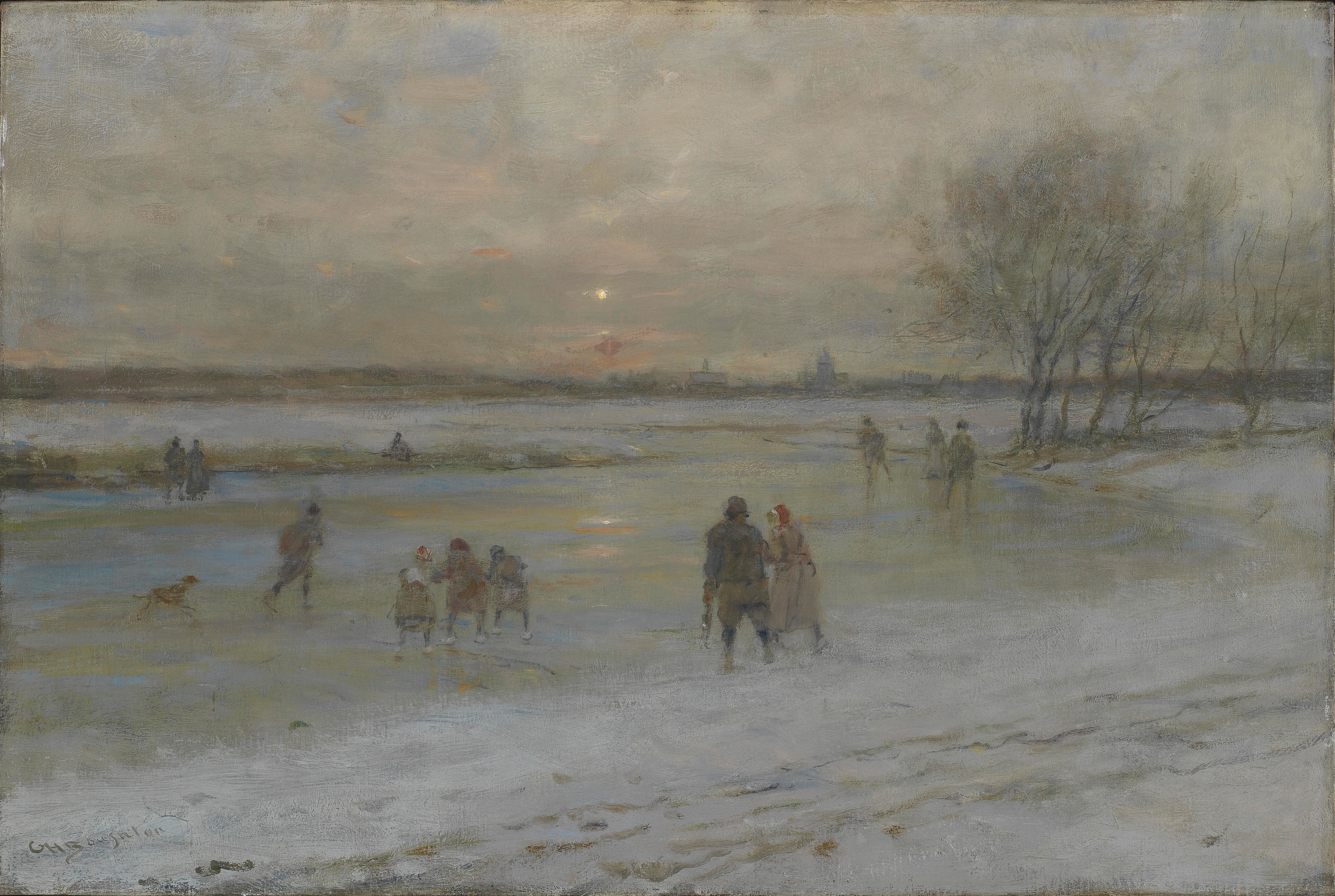
Winter Scene in Holland, c. 1903, Fitzwilliam Museum

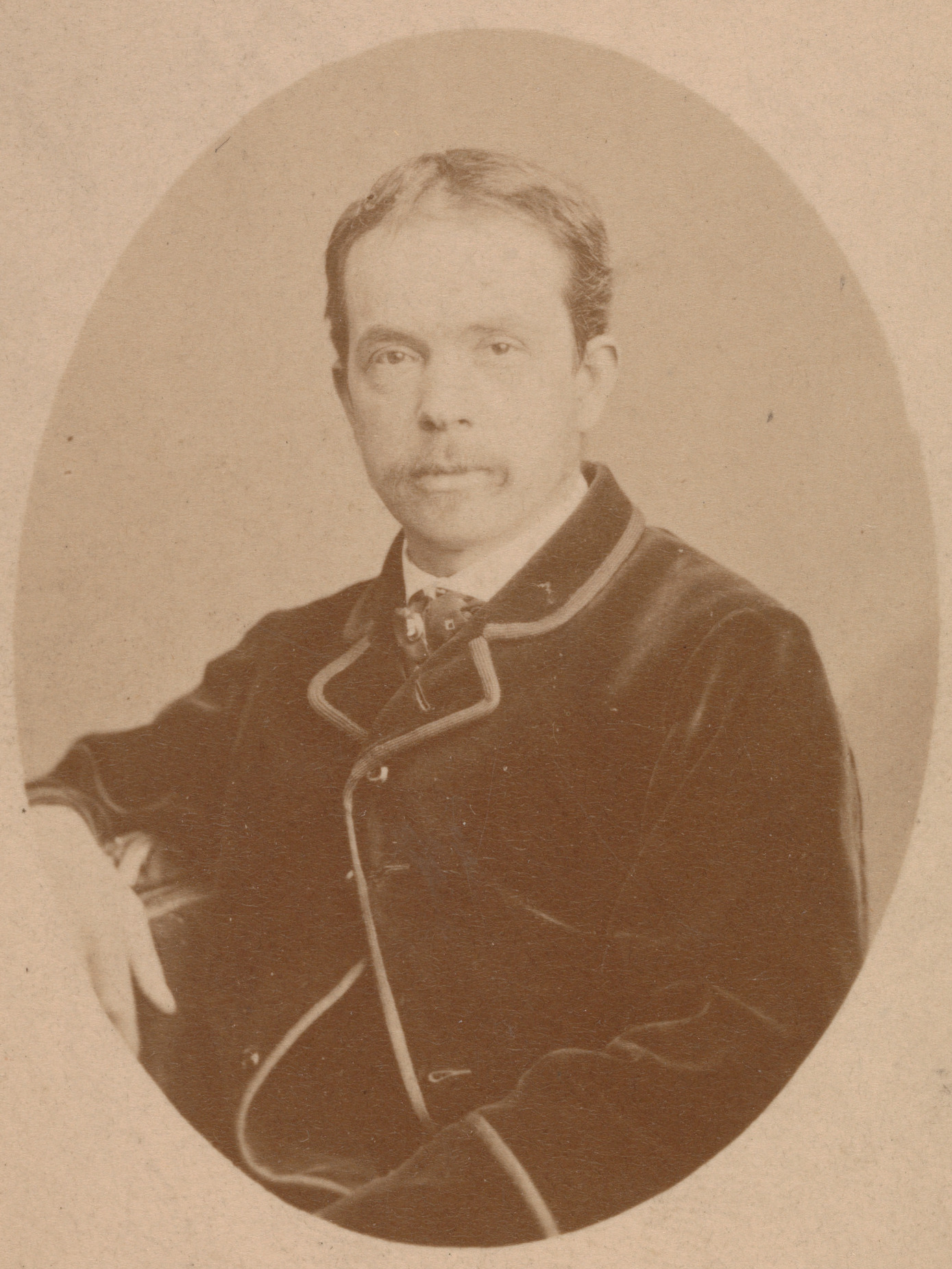
Boughton in the 1860s
