= Christianity in the United States =

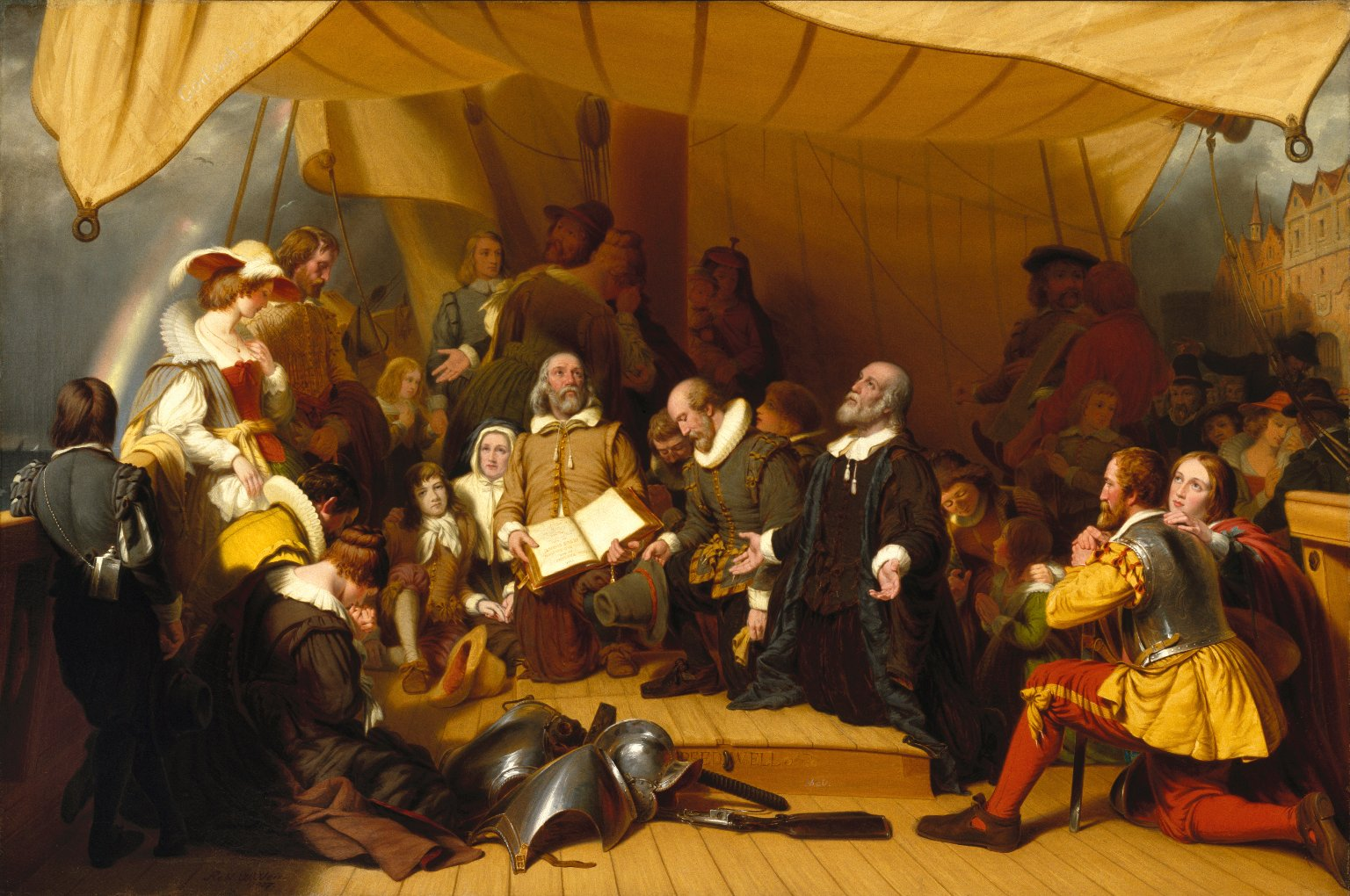
English Dissenters praying in "Embarkation of the Pilgrims", by Robert Walter Weir (1857)

Christianity is the predominant religion in the United States, although estimates vary among sources. According to a 2024 Gallup survey, approximately 69% of the U.S. population—about 235 million out of 340 million people—identify as Christian. A plurality of Americans identify as Protestant (45%), followed by Catholics (22%). Smaller Christian groups include members of the Church of Jesus Christ of Latter-day Saints (1.5%), Eastern Orthodox Christians (0.5%), and other Christian denominations (0.4%). The United States currently has the largest Christian population in the world, comprising nearly 235 million Christians. However, while the U.S. leads in absolute numbers, several other nations have a greater proportion of their populations identifying as Christian. The United States has the largest Protestant population globally, numbering more than 150 million adherents of different Protestant denominations, and is also the world's fourth-largest country with the highest number of Catholic followers.

Christianity was introduced to the Americas during European colonization beginning in the 16th and 17th centuries. European missionaries sought to spread Christianity among indigenous North Americans through conversion and Christianization, and immigration further increased Christian numbers. Going forward from its foundation, the United States has been called a Protestant nation by a variety of sources. When the categories of "irreligion" and "unaffiliated" are included as religious categories for statistical purposes, Protestantism is technically no longer the religious category of the majority; however, this is primarily the result of an increase in Americans, such as Americans of Protestant descent or background, professing no religious affiliation, rather than being the result of an increase in non-Protestant religious affiliations, and Protestantism remains by far the majority or dominant form of religion in the United States among American Christians and those Americans who declare a religion affiliation. Today, most Christian churches in the United States are either Mainline Protestant, Evangelical Protestant, or Catholic.

The Public Religion Research Institute's "2020 Census of American Religion", carried out between 2014 and 2020, showed that 70% of Americans identified as Christian during this seven-year interval. In a 2020 survey by the Pew Research Center, 65% of adults in the United States identified themselves as Christians. They were 75% in 2015, 70.6% in 2014, 78% in 2012, 81.6% in 2001, and 85% in 1990. By 2005, around 62% of those polled claim to be members of a church congregation. The 2023–2024 Pew Religious Landscape Survey in the United States found that 40% identitied as Protestant and 19% as Catholic.

All Protestant denominations accounted for 48.5% of the population, making Protestantism the most common form of Christianity in the country and the majority religion in general in the United States, while Catholicism by itself, at 22.7% of the population, is the largest individual denomination. The nation's second-largest denomination and the single largest Protestant denomination is the Southern Baptist Convention. Among Eastern Christian denominations, there are several Eastern Orthodox and Oriental Orthodox churches, with just below 1 million adherents in the U.S., or 0.4% of the total population. Christianity is the predominant religion in all U.S. states and territories. Conversion into Christianity has significantly increased among Korean Americans, Chinese Americans, and Japanese Americans in the United States. In 2012, the percentage of Christians in these communities were 71%, 30% and 37% respectively.

== History ==
Christianity was introduced during the period of European colonization. The Spanish and French brought Catholicism to the colonies of New Spain and New France respectively, while the British and Germans introduced Protestantism. Among Protestants, adherents to Anglicanism, Calvinism, Lutheranism, Quakerism, Anabaptism, Methodism and the Moravian Church were the first to settle in the American colonies.

European Christian colonists introduced Christianity to indigenous communities in North America. The term Praying Indian was used in the 17th century to refer to Native Americans who had converted to Christianity and assimilated to Christian practices. Christianity played an important role in the cultural assimilation of Native Americans in the history of the United States.

=== Early colonial period ===
==== Dutch colonies ====
The Dutch founded the colony of New Netherland in 1624; they established the Dutch Reformed Church as the colony's official religion in 1628. When Sweden established New Sweden in the Delaware River Valley in 1638, Church of Sweden was the colony's religion.

In 1657, some thirty residents of the small settlement at Flushing petitioned Director-General of New Netherland Peter Stuyvesant requesting an exemption to his ban on Quaker worship. The Flushing Remonstrance is considered a precursor to the United States Constitution's provision on freedom of religion in the Bill of Rights.

==== Spanish colonies ====
Spain established missions and towns in what are now Texas, New Mexico, Arizona, Florida, and California. Many cities and towns still retain the names of the Catholic saints these missions were named for; an excellent example of this is the full legal name of the city of Los Angeles: El Pueblo de Nuestra Señora Reina de Los Ángeles del Río Porciúncula, or The Town of Our Lady, Queen of the Angels of the Porciuncula River. The city was founded by Franciscan friars, who named their tiny church and later the town that formed around it after the Virgin Mary, also known to Catholics as Our Lady, Queen of the Angels. Similar patterns emerged wherever the Spanish went, such as San Antonio, Texas (named for Anthony of Padua), Santa Fe, New Mexico (named after Francis of Assisi,) and Saint Augustine, Florida (named for Augustine of Hippo), as was Saint Lucy County and Port Saint Lucy in Florida named for Saint Lucy/Santa Lucia although Saint Petersburg, Florida was not named for St. Peter, but for the city of the same name in Russia.

Conversion of Native Americans to Catholicism was a main goal of the Catholic missionaries, especially the Jesuits. This was common in places where French influence was strong, like Detroit or Louisiana. However, Christianity is also implicated in the deaths of one third of the indigenous population of California.

==== British colonies ====
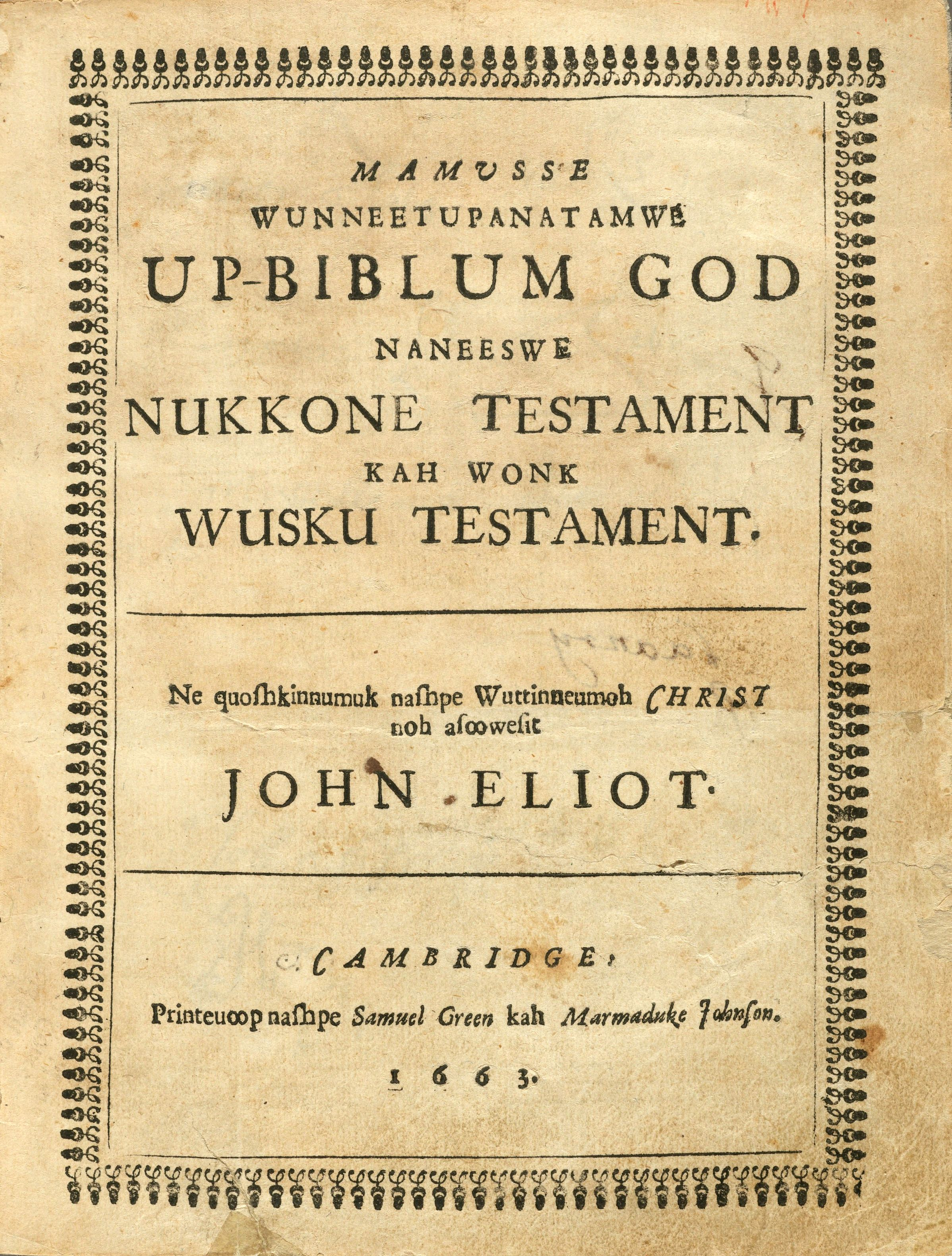
The 1663 Eliot Indian Bible (Massachusett: Mamusse Wunneetupanatamwe Up-Biblum God;), in the Algonquian language of the Massachusett, was the first Bible published in British North America.

Many of the British North American colonies that eventually formed the United States of America were settled in the 17th century by men and women, who, in the face of European religious persecution, refused to compromise passionately-held religious convictions and fled Europe.

===== Virginia =====
An Anglican chaplain was among the first group of English colonists, arriving in 1607. The Church of England was legally established in the colony in 1619; with a total of 22 Anglican clergymen having arrived by 1624. In practice, "establishment" meant that local taxes were funneled through the local parish to handle the needs of local government, such as roads and poor relief, in addition to the salary of the minister. There never was a bishop in colonial Virginia; the local vestry consisted of laymen controlled the parish. The colonists were typically inattentive, uninterested, and bored during church services, according to the ministers, who complained that the people were sleeping, whispering, ogling the fashionably dressed women, walking about and coming and going, or at best looking out the windows or staring blankly into space. There were too few ministers for the widely scattered population, so ministers encouraged parishioners to become devout at home, using the Book of Common Prayer for private prayer and devotion (rather than the Bible). The stress on personal piety opened the way for the First Great Awakening, which pulled people away from the established church and into the unauthorized Baptist and Methodist movements.

===== New England =====
A group which later became known as the Pilgrims settled the Plymouth Colony in Plymouth, Massachusetts in 1620, seeking refuge from persecution in Europe.

The Puritans, a much larger group than the Pilgrims, established the Massachusetts Bay Colony in 1629 with 400 settlers. Puritans were English Protestants who wished to reform and purify the Church of England in the New World of what they considered to be unacceptable residues of Catholicism. Within two years, an additional 2,000 settlers arrived. From 1620 to 1640 Puritans emigrated to New England from England to escape persecution and gain the liberty to worship as they chose independently of the Church of England, England being on the verge of the English Civil War. Most settled in New England, but some went as far as the West Indies. Theologically, the Puritans were "non-separating Congregationalists." The Puritans created a deeply religious, socially tight-knit and politically innovative culture that is still present in the modern United States. They hoped this new land would serve as a "redeemer nation."

Christianity's expansion had consequences for the indigenous people of the U.S., dating back to King Philip's War, 1675–76. From the pulpits of New England's Puritan divines came "an unvarying message" of the "evil native genius" that needed to be dealt with.

===== Tolerance in Rhode Island and Pennsylvania =====
Roger Williams, who preached religious tolerance, separation of church and state, and a complete break with the Church of England, was banished from Massachusetts and founded Rhode Island Colony, which became a haven for other religious refugees from the Puritan community. Some migrants who came to Colonial America were in search of the freedom to practice forms of Christianity which were prohibited and persecuted in Europe. Since there was no state religion, and since Protestantism had no central authority, religious practice in the colonies became diverse.

The Quakers formed in England in 1652, where they were severely persecuted in England for daring to deviate so far from orthodox Anglican Christianity. Many sought refuge in New Jersey, Rhode Island and especially Pennsylvania, which was owned by William Penn, a rich Quaker. The Quakers kept political control until Indian wars broke out; the Quakers were pacifists and gave up control to groups that were eager to fight the Indians.

Beginning in 1683 many German-speaking immigrants arrived in Pennsylvania from the Rhine Valley and Switzerland. Starting in the 1730s Count Zinzendorf and the Moravian Brethren sought to minister to these immigrants while they also began missions among the Native American tribes of New York and Pennsylvania. Heinrich Melchior Muehlenberg organized the first Lutheran Synod in Pennsylvania in the 1740s.

===== Maryland =====
In the English colonies, Catholicism was introduced with the settling of Maryland. Catholic fortunes fluctuated in Maryland during the rest of the 17th century, as they became an increasingly smaller minority of the population. After the Glorious Revolution of 1689 in England, penal laws deprived Catholics of the right to vote, hold office, educate their children or worship publicly. Until the American Revolution, Catholics in Maryland, like Charles Carroll of Carrollton, were dissenters in their own country but keeping loyal to their convictions. At the time of the Revolution, Catholics formed less than 1% of the population of the thirteen colonies, in 2007, Catholics comprised 24% of US population.

==== Great Awakening ====
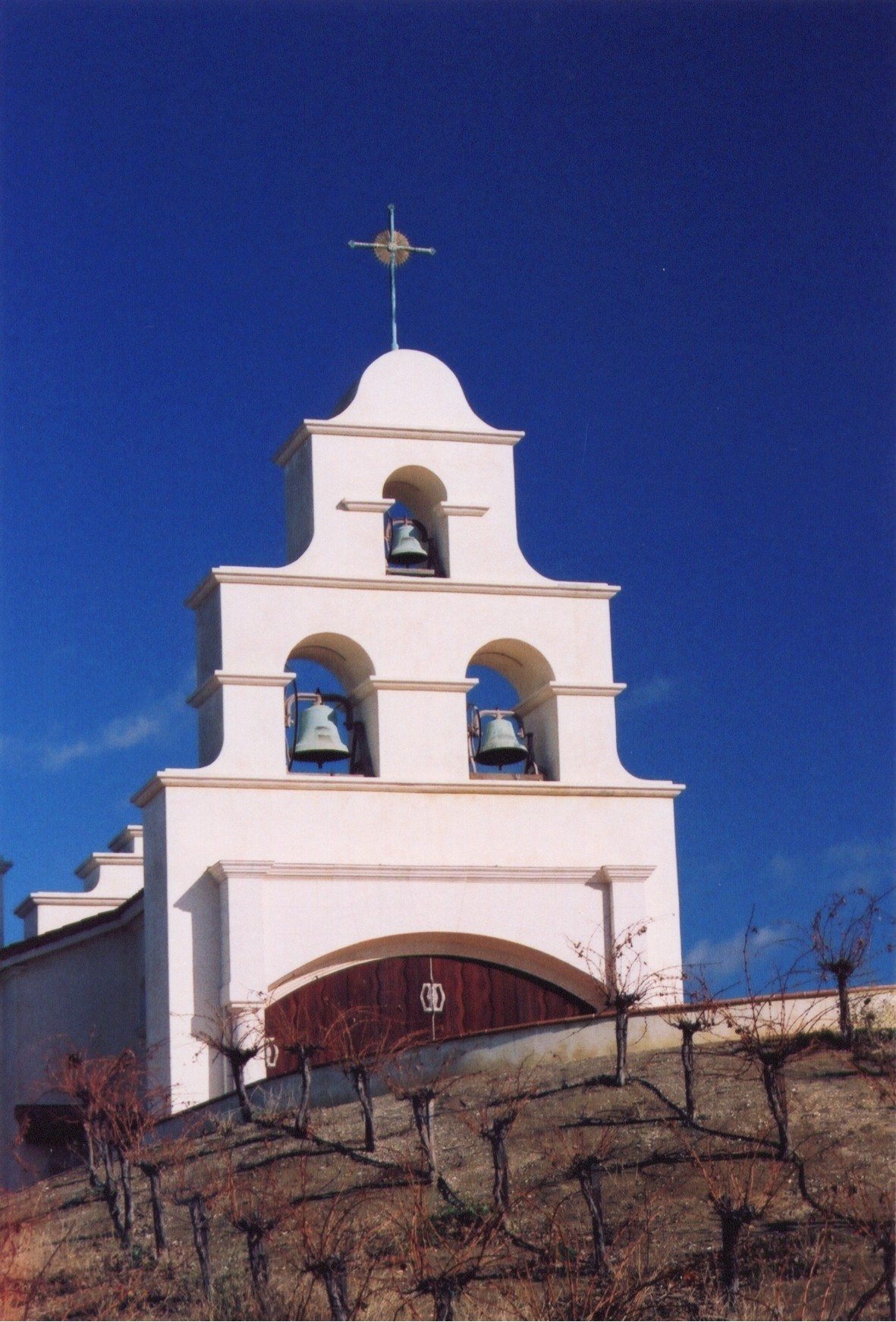
Spanish-style church in Shandon, California

Evangelicalism is difficult to date and to define. Scholars have argued that, as a self-conscious movement, evangelicalism did not arise until the mid-18th century, perhaps not until the Great Awakening itself. The fundamental premise of evangelicalism is the conversion of individuals from a state of sin to a "new birth" through the preaching of the Word. The Great Awakening refers to a northeastern Protestant revival movement that took place in the 1730s and 1740s.

The first generation of New England Puritans required that church members undergo a conversion experience that they could describe publicly. Their successors were not as successful in reaping harvests of redeemed souls. The movement began with Jonathan Edwards, a Massachusetts preacher who sought to return to the Pilgrims' strict Calvinist roots. British preacher George Whitefield and other itinerant preachers continued the movement, traveling across the colonies and preaching in a dramatic and emotional style. Followers of Edwards and other preachers of similar religiosity called themselves the "New Lights," as contrasted with the "Old Lights," who disapproved of their movement. To promote their viewpoints, the two sides established academies and colleges, including Princeton and Williams College. The Great Awakening has been called the first truly American event.

The supporters of the Awakening and its evangelical thrust—Presbyterians, Baptists, and Methodists—became the largest American Protestant denominations by the first decades of the 19th century. By the 1770s, the Baptists were growing rapidly both in the North (where they founded Brown University) and in the South. Opponents of the Awakening or those split by it—Anglicans, Quakers, and Congregationalists—were left behind.

The First Great Awakening of the 1740s increased religiosity in most of the colonies. By 1780, the percentage of adult colonists who formally held membership in a church was between 10% and 30%. North Carolina had the lowest percentage at about 4%, while New Hampshire and South Carolina were tied for the highest, at about 16%. Many others were informally associated with the churches.

==== American Revolution ====
The Revolution split some denominations, notably the Church of England, most of whose ministers supported the king. The Quakers and some German sects were pacifists and remained neutral. Religious practice suffered in certain places because of the absence of ministers and the destruction of churches, but in other areas, religion flourished.

Badly hurt, the Anglicans reorganized after the war. It became the Protestant Episcopal Church.

In 1794, the Russian Orthodox missionary St. Herman of Alaska arrived on Kodiak island in Alaska and began significantly evangelizing the native peoples. Nearly all Russians left in 1867 when the U.S. purchased Alaska, but the Eastern Orthodox faith remained.

Lambert (2003) has examined the religious affiliations and beliefs of the Founding Fathers of the United States. Of the 55 delegates to the 1787 Constitutional Convention, 49 were Protestants, and two were Catholics (D. Carroll, and Fitzsimons). Among the Protestant delegates to the Constitutional Convention, 28 were Church of England (or Episcopalian, after the American Revolutionary War was won), eight were Presbyterians, seven were Congregationalists, two were Lutherans, two were Dutch Reformed, and two were Methodists.

==== Church and state debate ====
After independence, the American states were obliged to write constitutions establishing how each would be governed. For three years, from 1778 to 1780, the political energies of Massachusetts were absorbed in drafting a charter of government that the voters would accept. One of the most contentious issues was whether the state would support the church financially. Advocating such a policy were the ministers and most members of the Congregational Church, which received public financial support, during the colonial period. The Baptists tenaciously adhered to their ancient conviction that churches should receive no support from the state. The Constitutional Convention chose to support the church and Article Three authorized a general religious tax to be directed to the church of a taxpayers' choice.

Such tax laws also took effect in Connecticut and New Hampshire.

=== 19th century ===
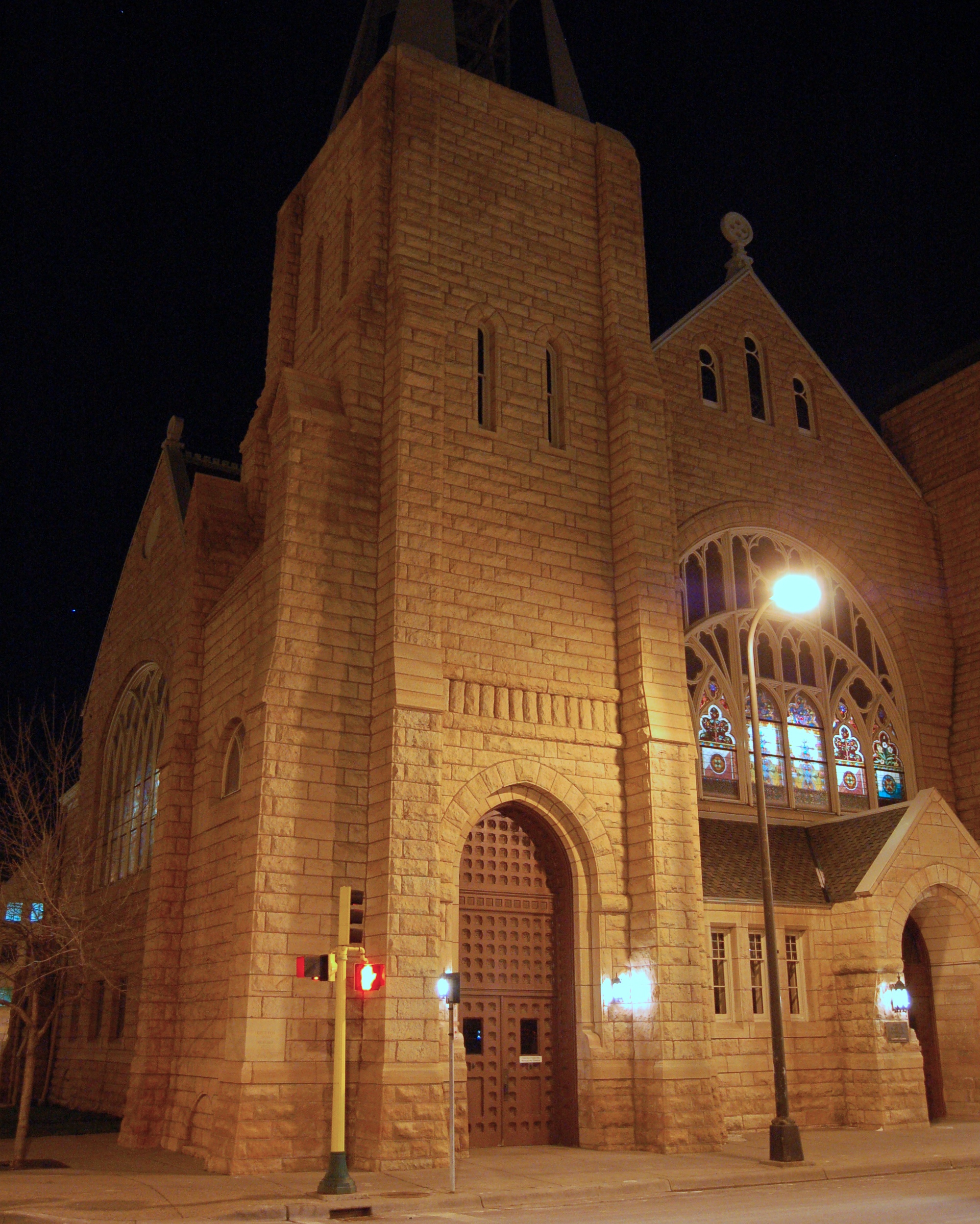
First Baptist Church in Minneapolis, Minnesota

==== Separation of church and state ====
In October 1801, members of the Danbury Baptists Associations wrote a letter to the new President-elect Thomas Jefferson. Baptists, being a minority in Connecticut, were still required to pay fees to support the Congregationalist majority. The Baptists found this intolerable. The Baptists, well aware of Jefferson's own unorthodox beliefs, sought him as an ally in making all religious expression a fundamental human right and not a matter of government largesse.

In his January 1, 1802, reply to the Danbury Baptist Association Jefferson summed up the First Amendment's original intent, and used for the first time anywhere a now-familiar phrase in today's political and judicial circles: the amendment, he wrote, established a "wall of separation between church and state." Largely unknown in its day, this phrase has since become a major Constitutional issue. The first time the U.S. Supreme Court cited that phrase from Jefferson was in 1878, 76 years later.

==== Second Great Awakening ====
The Second Great Awakening was a Protestant movement that began around 1790, gained momentum by 1800, and saw membership rise rapidly after 1820 among Baptist and Methodist congregations whose preachers led the movement. It was past its peak by the 1840s. It was a reaction against skepticism, deism, and rational Christianity, and was especially attractive to young women. Millions of new members enrolled in existing evangelical denominations, and the movement led to the formation of new denominations. Many converts believed that the Awakening heralded a new millennial age. The Second Great Awakening stimulated the establishment of many reform movements designed to remedy the evils of society before the anticipated Second Coming of Jesus Christ. The network of voluntary reform societies inspired by the Awakening was called the Benevolent Empire.

During the Second Great Awakening, new Protestant denominations emerged, such as Adventism, churches in the Restoration Movement, and groups such as Jehovah's Witnesses and the Latter Day Saint movement. While the First Great Awakening was centered on reviving the spirituality of established congregations, the Second focused on the unchurched and sought to instill in them a deep sense of personal salvation as experienced in revival meetings.

The principal innovation produced by the revivals was the camp meeting. When assembled in a field or at the edge of a forest for a prolonged religious meeting, the participants transformed the site into a camp meeting. Singing and preaching were the main activities for several days. The revivals were often intense and created intense emotions. Some fell away, but many, if not most, became permanent church members. The Methodists and Baptists made the camp one of the evangelical signatures of the denomination.

==== African American churches ====
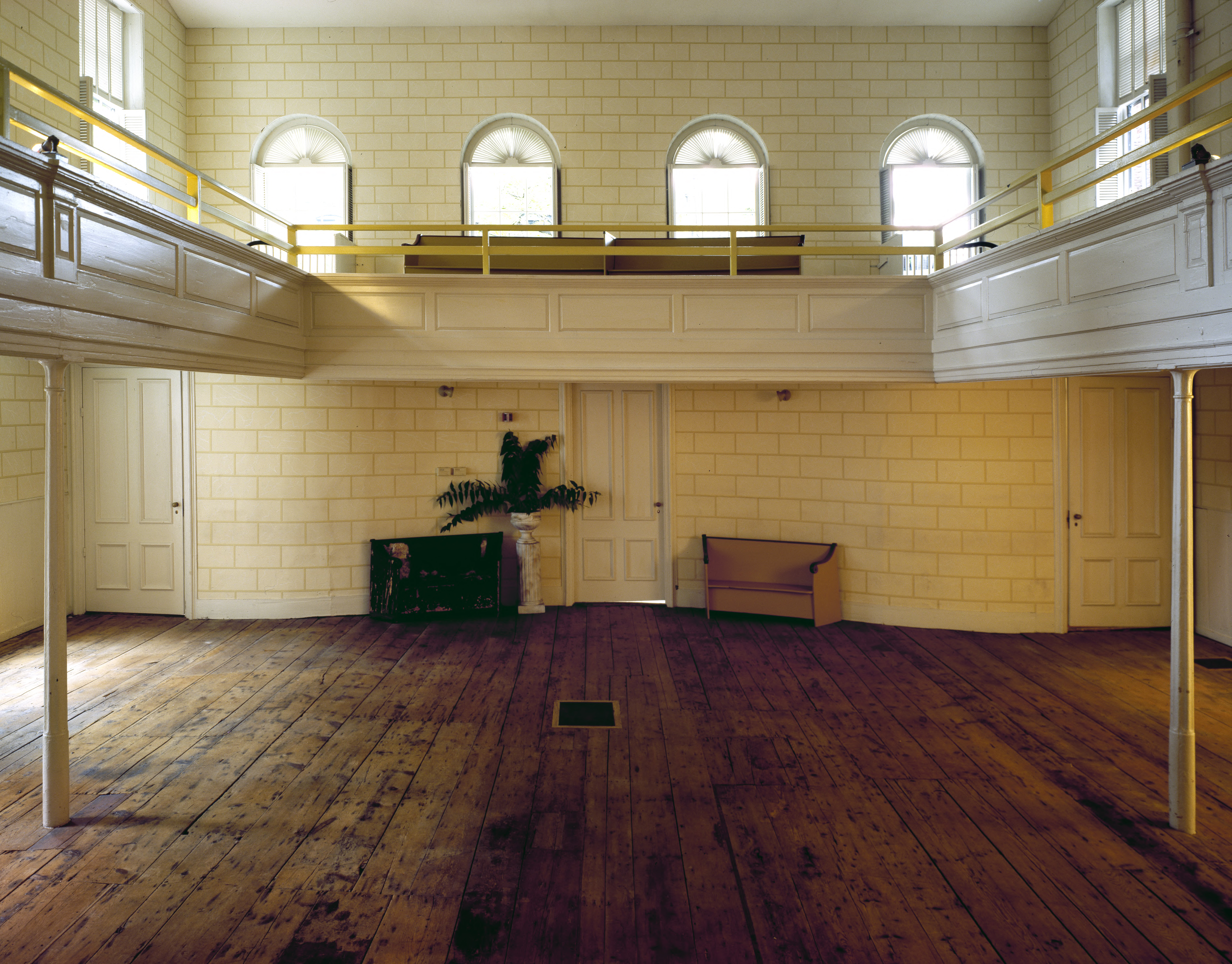
African Meeting House in Boston, the oldest extant Black church edifice in the U.S.

The Christianity of the black population was grounded in evangelicalism. The Second Great Awakening has been called the "central and defining event in the development of Afro-Christianity." During these revivals Baptists and Methodists converted large numbers of blacks. However, many were disappointed at the treatment they received from their fellow believers and at the backsliding in the commitment to abolish slavery that many white Baptists and Methodists had advocated immediately after the American Revolution.

When their discontent could not be contained, forceful black leaders followed what was becoming an American habit—they formed new denominations. In 1787, Richard Allen and his colleagues in Philadelphia broke away from the Methodist Church and in 1815 founded the African Methodist Episcopal (AME) Church.

After the Civil War, Black Baptists desiring to practice Christianity away from racial discrimination, rapidly set up several separate state Baptist conventions. In 1866, black Baptists of the South and West combined to form the Consolidated American Baptist Convention. This convention eventually collapsed but three national conventions formed in response. In 1895 the three conventions merged to create the National Baptist Convention. It is now the largest African-American religious organization in the United States.

==== Liberal Christianity ====
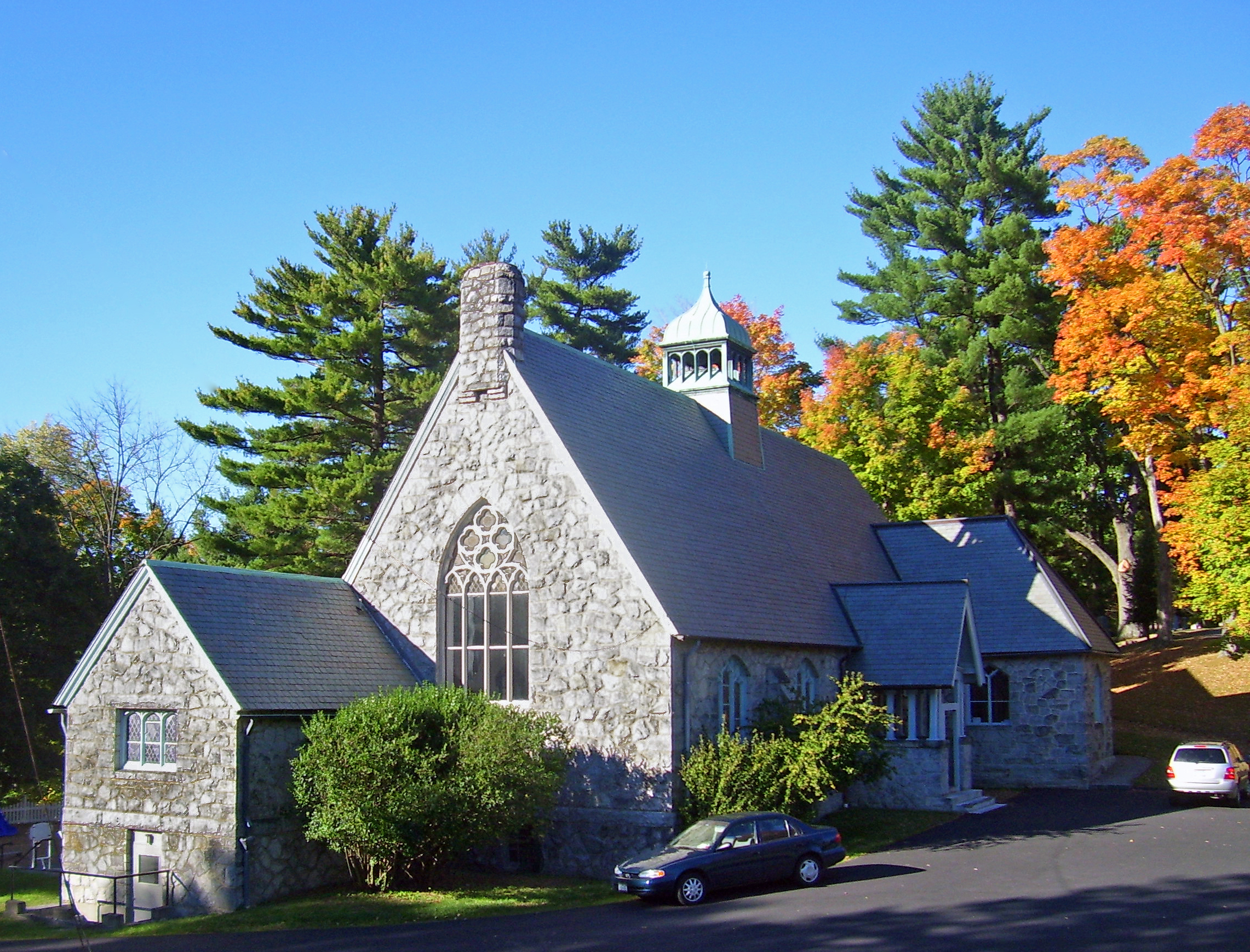
St. Philip's Church in the Highlands, an Episcopal church in Garrison, New York

The "secularization of society" is attributed to the time of the Enlightenment. In the United States, religious observance is much higher than in Europe, and the United States' culture leans conservative in comparison to other western nations, in part due to the Christian element.

Liberal Christianity, exemplified by some theologians, sought to bring to churches new critical approaches to the Bible. Sometimes called "liberal theology", liberal Christianity is an umbrella term covering movements and ideas within 19th- and 20th-century Christianity. New attitudes became evident, and the practice of questioning the nearly universally accepted Christian orthodoxy began to come to the forefront.

In the post–World War I era, liberalism was the faster-growing sector of the American church. Liberal wings of denominations were on the rise, and a considerable number of seminaries held and taught from a liberal perspective as well. In the post–World War II era, the trend began to swing back towards the conservative camp in America's seminaries and church structures.

==== Catholic Church ====
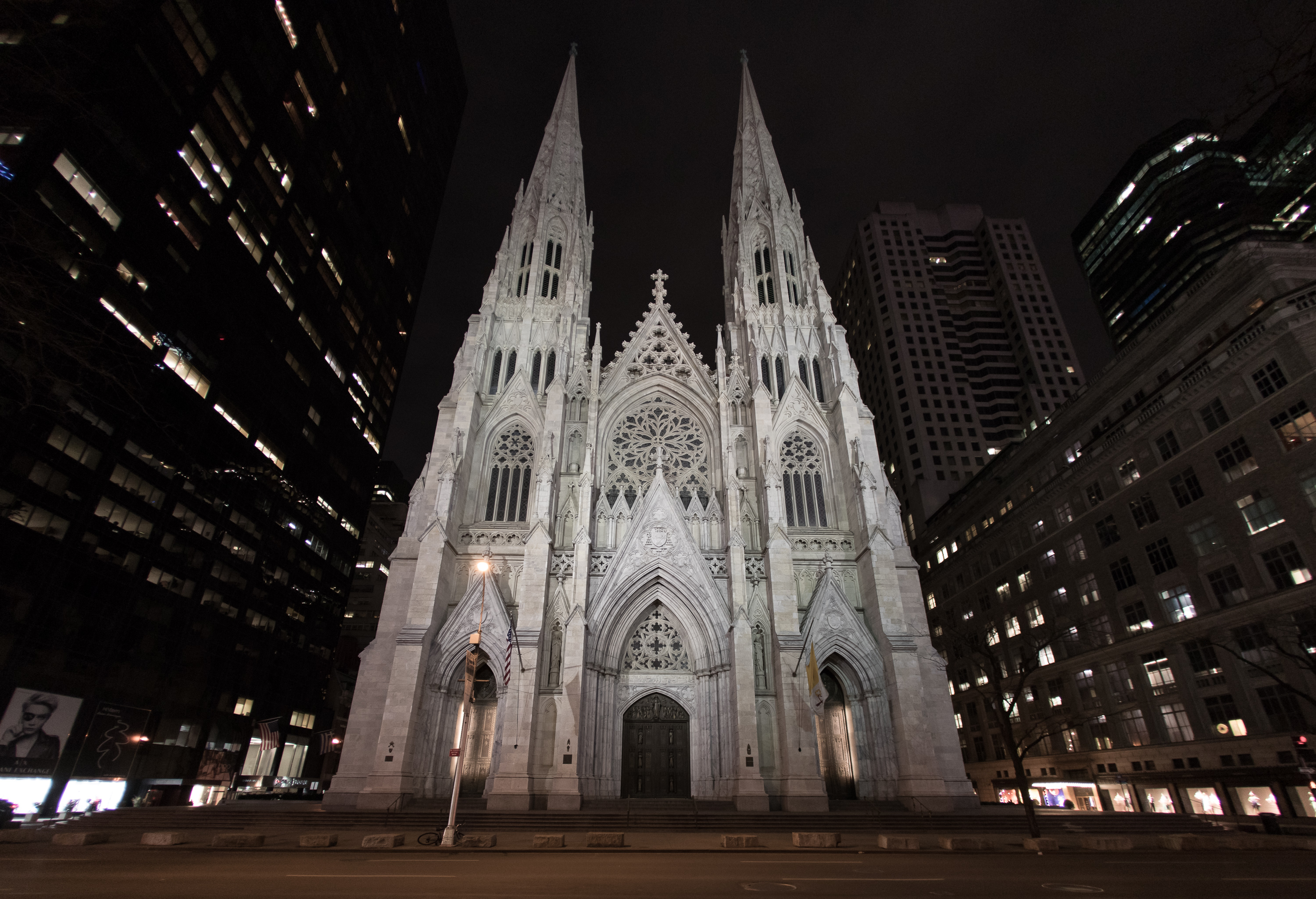
Saint Patrick's Cathedral in New York City

By 1850, Catholics had become the country's largest single denomination. Between 1860 and 1890 the population of Catholics in the United States tripled through immigration; by the end of the decade, it would reach seven million. These huge numbers of immigrant Catholics came from Ireland, Quebec, Southern Germany, Italy, Poland and Eastern Europe. This influx would eventually bring increased political power for the Catholic Church and a greater cultural presence led at the same time to a growing fear of the Catholic "menace". As the 19th century wore on, animosity waned; Protestant Americans realized that Catholics were not trying to seize control of the government.

==== Fundamentalism ====
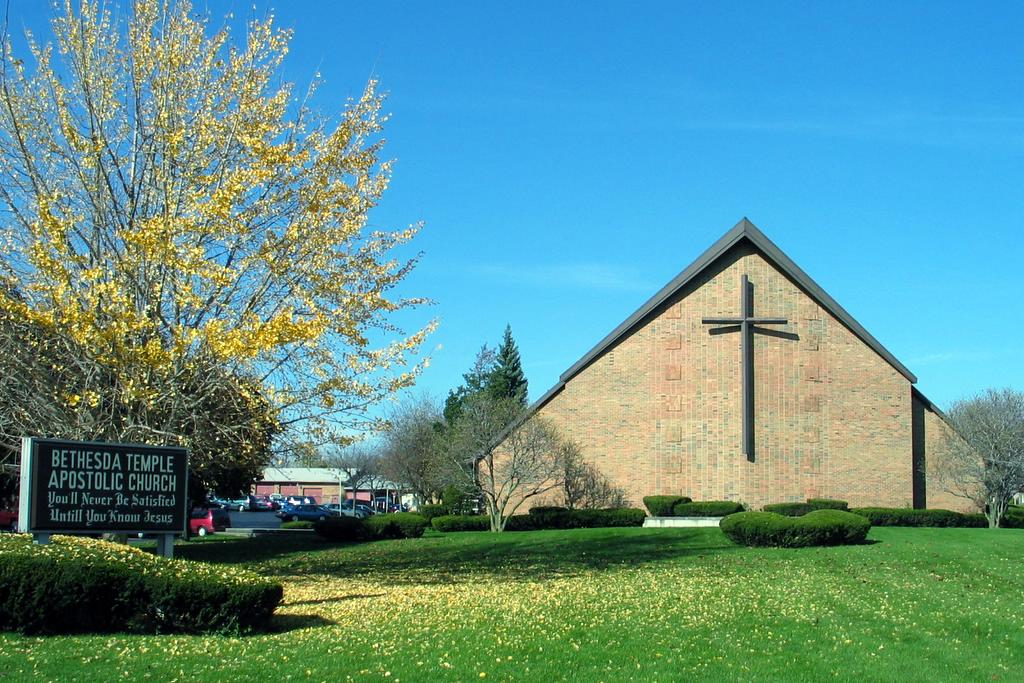
Bethesda Temple Apostolic Church in Dayton, Ohio

Protestant fundamentalism began as a movement in the late 19th century and early 20th century to reject influences of secular humanism and source criticism in modern Christianity. In reaction to liberal Protestant groups that denied doctrines considered fundamental to these conservative groups, they sought to establish tenets necessary to maintaining a Christian identity, the "fundamentals," hence the term fundamentalist.

Over time, the movement divided, with the label Fundamentalist being retained by the smaller and more hard-line group(s). Evangelical has become the main identifier of the groups holding to the movement's moderate and earliest ideas.

=== 20th century ===
==== Evangelicalism ====
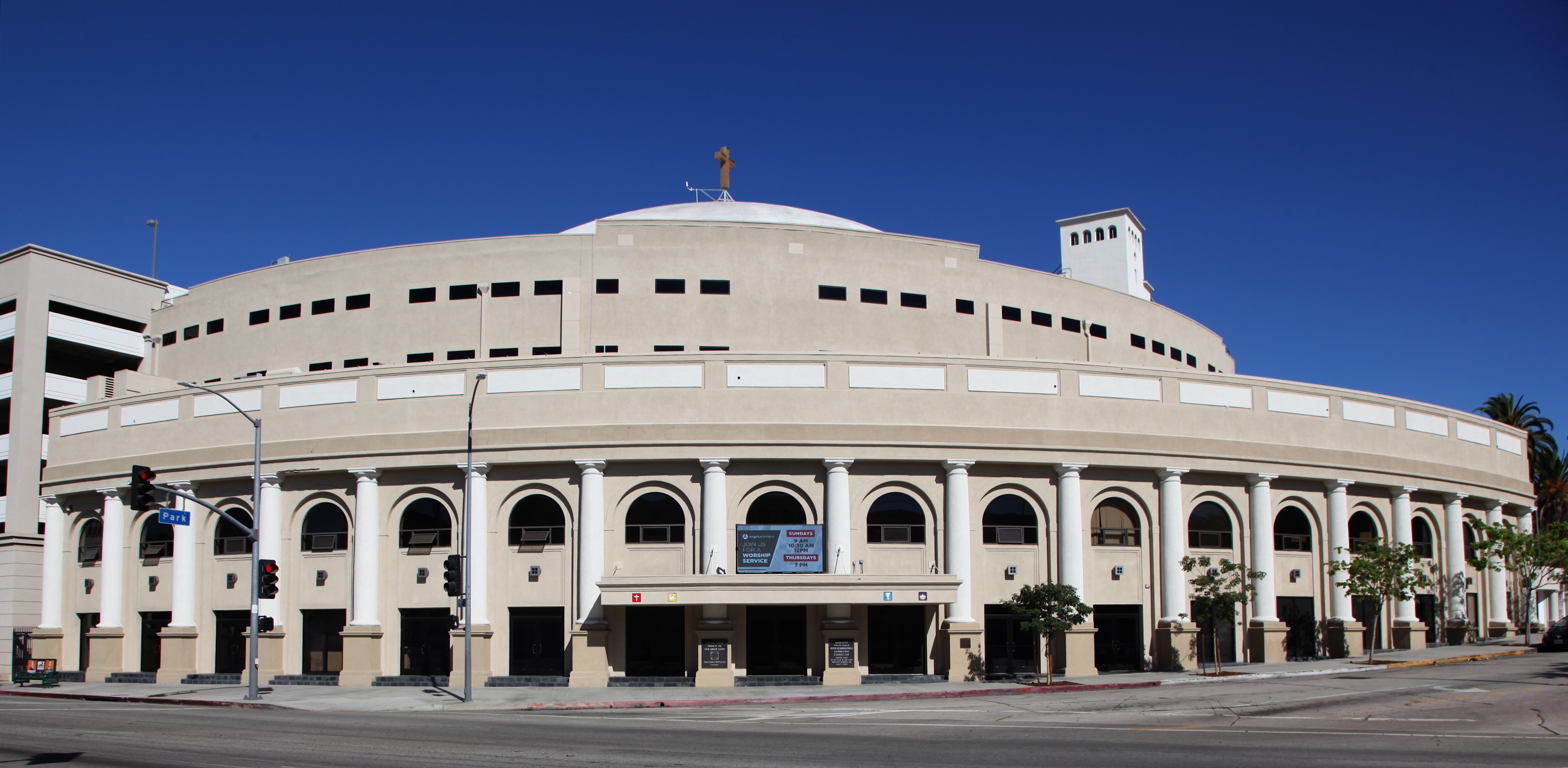
Angelus Temple, an Evangelical Church in Los Angeles

In the U.S. and elsewhere in the world, there has been a marked rise in the evangelical wing of Protestant denominations, especially those that are more exclusively evangelical, and a corresponding decline in the mainstream liberal churches.

The 1950s saw a boom in the Evangelical church in America. The post–World War II prosperity experienced in the U.S. also had its effects on the church. Church buildings were erected in large numbers, and the Evangelical church's activities grew along with this expansive physical growth. In the southern U.S., the Evangelicals, represented by leaders such as Billy Graham, have experienced a notable surge displacing the caricature of the pulpit pounding country preachers of fundamentalism. The stereotypes have gradually shifted.

Although the Evangelical community worldwide is diverse, the ties that bind all Evangelicals are still apparent: a "high view" of Scripture, belief in the Deity of Christ, the Trinity, salvation by grace through faith, and the bodily resurrection of Christ.

==== National associations ====
The Federal Council of Churches, founded in 1908, marked the first major expression of a growing modern ecumenical movement among Christians in the United States. It was active in pressing for reform of public and private policies, particularly as they impacted the lives of those living in poverty, and developed a comprehensive and widely debated Social Creed, which served as a humanitarian "bill of rights" for those seeking improvements in American life.

In 1950, the founding of National Council of the Churches of Christ in the USA (usually identified as National Council of Churches, or NCC) represented a dramatic expansion in the development of ecumenical cooperation. It was a merger of the Federal Council of Churches, the International Council of Religious Education, and several other interchurch ministries. Today, the NCC is a joint venture of 35 Christian denominations in the United States with 100,000 local congregations and 45,000,000 adherents. Its member communions include Mainline Protestant, Eastern Orthodox, Oriental Orthodox, African-American, Evangelical, and historic Peace churches. The NCC took a prominent role in the Civil Rights Movement and fostered the publication of the widely used Revised Standard Version of the Bible, followed by an updated New Revised Standard Version, the first translation to benefit from the discovery of the Dead Sea Scrolls. The organization is headquartered in New York City, with a public policy office in Washington, DC. The NCC is related fraternally to hundreds of local and regional councils of churches, to other national councils across the globe, and to the World Council of Churches. All of these bodies are independently governed.

Carl McIntire led in organizing the American Council of Christian Churches (ACCC), now with 7 member bodies, in September 1941. It was a more militant and fundamentalist organization set up in opposition to what became the National Council of Churches.

The National Association of Evangelicals for United Action was formed in St. Louis, Missouri, on April 7–9, 1942. It soon shortened its name to the National Association of Evangelicals (NAE). There are currently 60 denominations with about 45,000 churches in the organization. The NAE is related fraternally to the World Evangelical Fellowship.

In 2006, 39 communions and 7 Christian organizations officially launched Christian Churches Together in the USA (CCT). CCT provides a space that is inclusive of the diversity of Christian traditions in the United States—Evangelical/Pentecostal, Eastern Orthodox, Oriental Orthodox, Catholic, historic Protestant, and historic Black churches. CCT is characterized by its emphasis on relationships and prayer. Every year these communions and organizations meet over four days to discuss critical social issues, pray, and strengthen their relationships.

==== Pentecostalism ====
Another noteworthy development in 20th-century Christianity was the rise of the modern Pentecostal movement. Pentecostalism, which had its roots in the Pietism and the Holiness movement, many will cite that it arose out of the meetings in 1906 at an urban mission on Azusa Street in Los Angeles, but it actually started in 1900 in Topeka, Kansas with a group led by Charles Parham and the Bethel Bible School. From there it spread by those who experienced what they believed to be miraculous moves of God there.

Pentecostalism would later birth the Charismatic movement within already established denominations, and it continues to be an important force in Western Christianity.

==== Catholic Church ====
By the beginning of the 20th century, approximately one-sixth of the population of the United States was Catholic. Modern Catholic immigrants come to the United States from the Philippines, Poland, and Latin America, especially from Mexico. This multiculturalism and diversity have greatly impacted the flavor of Catholicism in the United States. For example, many dioceses serve in both the English language and the Spanish language.

=== 21st century ===
==== Catholic Church and Pope Leo XIV ====
Following the death of Pope Francis in 2025, the conclave elected Cardinal Robert Francis Prevost as the first United States-born pope in history. Prevost, an Augustinian, was born in Chicago and attended Villanova University outside of Philadelphia. He chose the papal name of Leo XIV upon his election.

== Major denominational families ==
The map above shows the largest religious classification by state as of 2023 to 2024. In 41 out of the 50 states, a Christian denomination was the largest religious group. Protestant 70 – 79% 60 – 69% 50 – 59% 40 – 49% Under 40% Catholic 40 – 49% Under 40% Mormon 50 - 59% Unaffiliated 40 - 49% Under 40%

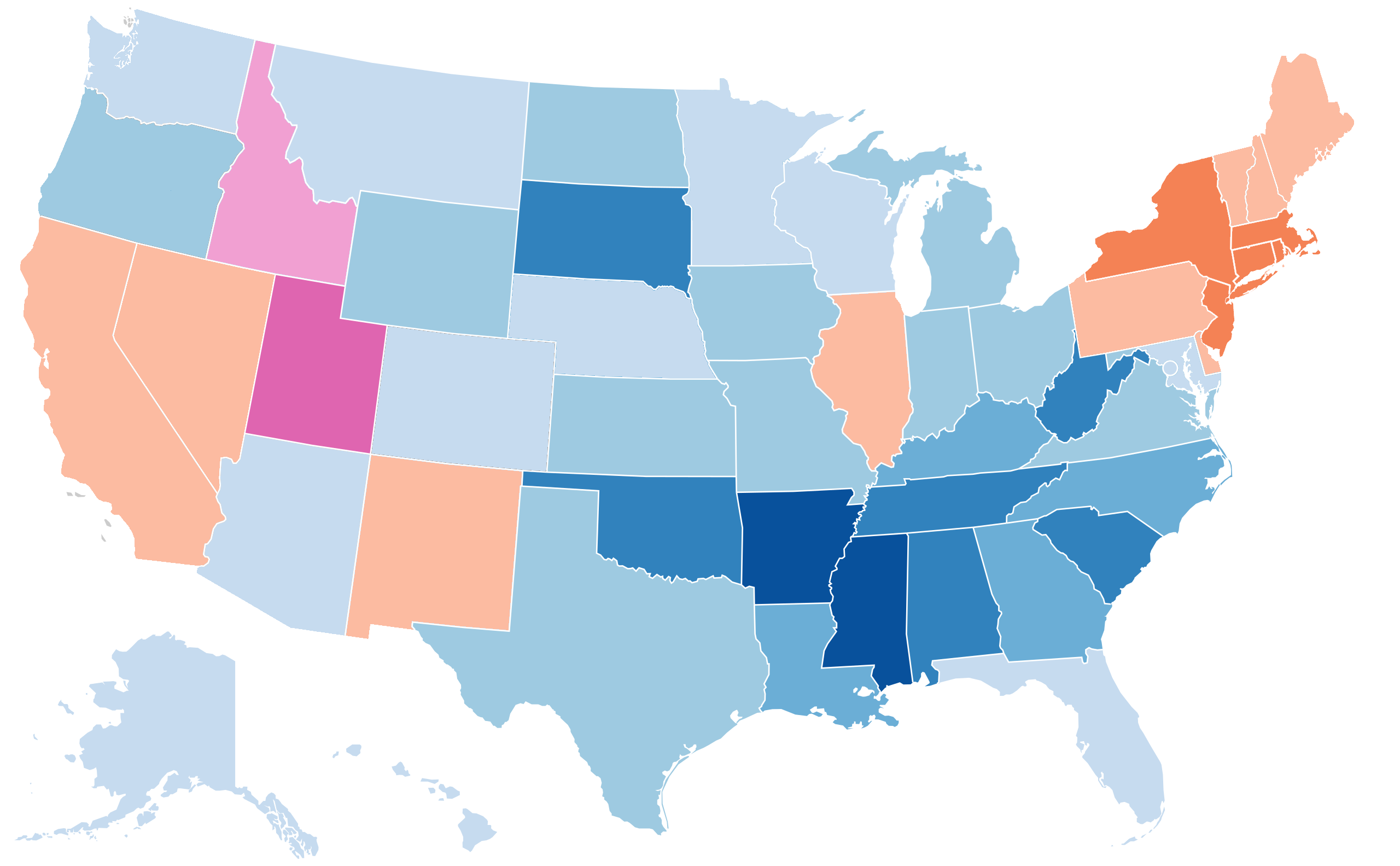
The map above shows the largest religious classification by state according to the 2020 ARDA U.S. Religion Census. Protestant 70 – 79% 60 – 69% 50 – 59% 40 – 49% Under 40% Catholic 40 – 49% Under 40% Mormon 50 - 59% Under 40%

Christian denominations in the United States are usually divided into three large groups: two types of Protestantism (evangelical and mainline) and Catholicism. There are also Christian denominations, making up a smaller percentage, that do not fall within the confines of these groups, such as Eastern and Oriental Orthodoxy and various restorationist groups such as the Latter Day Saint movement, Adventists and Jehovah's Witnesses.

A 2004 survey of the United States identified the percentages of these groups as 26.3% (Evangelical), 17.5% (Catholics), and 16% (Mainline); the other groups made up 2.7%. In a Statistical Abstract of the United States, based on a 2001 study of the self-described religious identification of the adult population, the percentages for these same groups are 28.6% (Evangelical), 24.5% (Catholics), and 13.9% (Mainline). Christian religious groups made up 76.5% of the total population, while the other religious groups account for 3.7%. According the 2020 ARDA Database, there were approximately 60 million Christians independent from denominations.

=== Protestantism ===
In typical usage, the term mainline is contrasted with evangelical.

The Association of Religion Data Archives (ARDA) counts 26,344,933 members of mainline churches versus 39,930,869 members of evangelical Protestant churches. There is evidence that there has been a shift in membership from mainline denominations to evangelical churches. Additionally, ARDA's 2010 study indicated Baptists were the largest Protestant group throughout the United States, followed by non-denominational Protestants. By 2014, the Pew Research Center determined non- and inter-denominational Protestants became the second-largest Christian group with Baptists third. ARDA's 2020 religion census also counted the movement as overtaking Baptists, making up more than 13.1% of the religious population and 6.4% of the general population.

As shown in the table below (from 2015), some denominations with similar names and historical ties to Evangelical groups are considered Mainline.

Protestant: Mainline vs. Evangelical vs. Traditionally Black Church
Family	% of US population	Examples	Type	% of population
Baptist	15.4%	Southern Baptist Convention	Evangelical	5.3%
Baptist	15.4%	Independent Baptist, evangelical	Evangelical	2.5%
Baptist	15.4%	American Baptist Churches USA	Mainline	1.5%
Baptist	15.4%	National Baptist Convention, USA, Inc.	Black church	1.4%
Nondenominational	6.2%	Nondenominational evangelical	Evangelical	2.0%
Nondenominational	6.2%	Interdenominational evangelical	Evangelical	0.6%
Methodist	4.6%	United Methodist Church	Mainline	3.6%
Methodist	4.6%	African Methodist Episcopal Church	Black church	0.3%
Pentecostal	4.6%	Assemblies of God	Evangelical	1.4%
Pentecostal	4.6%	Church of God in Christ	Black church	0.6%
Lutheran	3.5%	Evangelical Lutheran Church in America	Mainline	1.4%
Lutheran	3.5%	Lutheran Church – Missouri Synod	Evangelical	1.1%
Presbyterian/ Reformed	2.2%	Presbyterian Church (USA)	Mainline	0.9%
Presbyterian/ Reformed	2.2%	Presbyterian Church in America	Evangelical	0.4%
Restorationist	1.9%	Church of Christ	Evangelical	1.5%
Restorationist	1.9%	Disciples of Christ	Mainline	<0.3%
Anglican	1.3%	Episcopal Church	Mainline	0.9%
Anglican	1.3%	Anglican Church in North America	Evangelical	<0.3%
Holiness	0.8%	Church of the Nazarene	Evangelical	0.3%
Congregationalism	0.8%	United Church of Christ	Mainline	0.4%
Adventist	0.6%	Seventh-day Adventist Church	Evangelical	0.5%
Friends (Quakers)	<0.3%	Friends General Conference	Mainline	<0.3%

==== Evangelical Protestantism ====
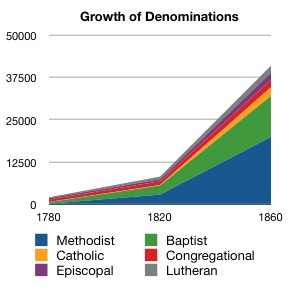
Ever since the Second Great Awakening, Evangelicalism has been very influential. Note the increasing membership of Baptist and Methodist churches.

Evangelicalism is a Protestant Christian movement. In typical usage, the term mainline is contrasted with evangelical. Most adherents consider the key characteristics of evangelicalism to be: a belief in the need for personal conversion (or being "born again"); some expression of the gospel in effort; a high regard for Biblical authority; and an emphasis on the death and resurrection of Jesus. David Bebbington has termed these four distinctive aspects conversionism, activism, biblicism, and crucicentrism, saying, "Together they form a quadrilateral of priorities that is the basis of Evangelicalism."

Note that the term "Evangelical" does not equal Fundamentalist Christianity, although the latter is sometimes regarded simply as the most theologically conservative subset of the former. The major differences largely hinge upon views of how to regard and approach scripture ("Theology of Scripture"), as well as construing its broader world-view implications. While most conservative Evangelicals believe the label has broadened too much beyond its more limiting traditional distinctives, this trend is nonetheless strong enough to create significant ambiguity in the term. As a result, the dichotomy between "evangelical" vs. "mainline" denominations is increasingly complex (particularly with such innovations as the "Emergent Church" movement).

The contemporary North American usage of the term is influenced by the evangelical/fundamentalist controversy of the early 20th century. Evangelicalism may sometimes be perceived as the middle ground between the theological liberalism of the Mainline (Protestant) denominations and the cultural separatism of Fundamentalist Protestantism. Evangelicalism has therefore been described as "the third of the leading strands in American Protestantism, straddl[ing] the divide between fundamentalists and liberals." While the North American perception is important to understand the usage of the term, it by no means dominates a wider global view, where the fundamentalist debate was not so influential.

Historically, Evangelicals held the view that modernist and liberal parties in the Protestant churches had compromised Christian teachings by accommodating the views and values of the secular world. At the same time, they criticized Fundamentalists for their separatism and rejection of the Social Gospel as it had been developed by Protestant activists during the previous century. They argued that the core Gospel and its message needed to be reasserted to distinguish it from the innovations and traditions of the liberals and fundamentalists.

They sought allies in denominational churches and liturgical traditions, disregarding views of eschatology and other "non-essentials," and joined also with Trinitarian varieties of Pentecostalism. They believed that in doing so, they were simply re-acquainting Protestantism with its own recent tradition. The movement's aim at the outset was to reclaim the Evangelical heritage in their respective churches, not to begin something new; and for this reason, following their separation from Fundamentalists, the same movement has been better known merely as "Evangelicalism." By the end of the 20th century, this was the most influential development in American Protestant Christianity.

The National Association of Evangelicals is a U.S. agency which coordinates cooperative ministry for its member denominations.

A 2015 study estimated that the U.S. has about 450,000 Christians from a Muslim background, most of whom are evangelicals or Pentecostals.

==== Mainline Protestantism ====
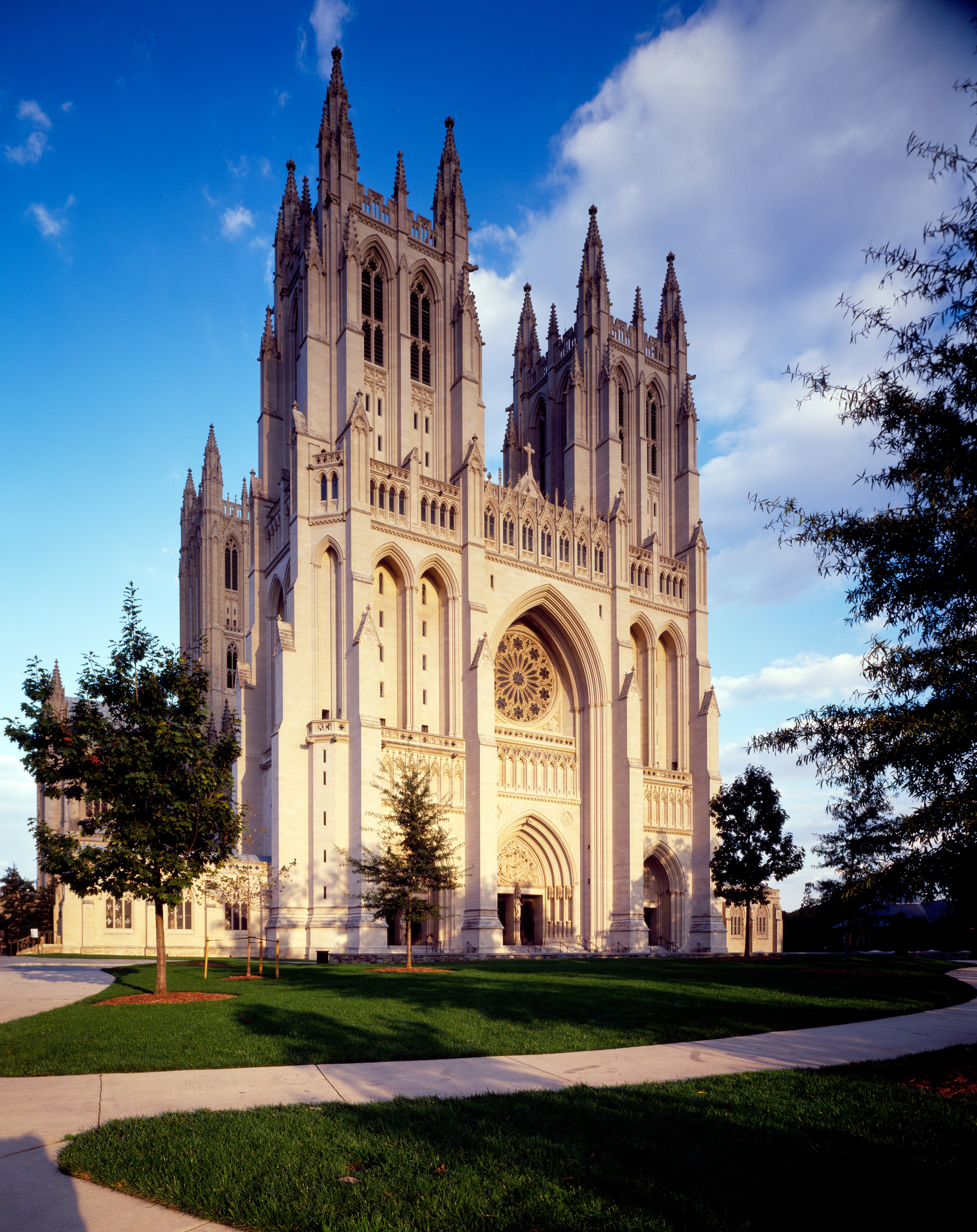
The National Cathedral (Episcopalian) in Washington, D.C.

The mainline Protestant Christian denominations are those Protestant denominations that were brought to the United States by its historic immigrant groups; for this reason, they are sometimes referred to as heritage churches. The largest are the Episcopal (English), Presbyterian (Scottish), Methodist (English and Welsh), and Lutheran (German and Scandinavian) churches.

Mainline Protestantism, including the Episcopalians (76%), the Presbyterians (64%), and the United Church of Christ has the highest number of graduate and post-graduate degrees per capita, of any Christian denomination in the United States, as well as the most high-income earners.

Episcopalians and Presbyterians tend to be considerably wealthier and better educated than most other religious groups among Americans, and are disproportionately represented in the upper reaches of American business, law and politics, especially the Republican Party. Numbers of the most wealthy and affluent American families as the Vanderbilts and Astors, Rockefeller, Du Pont, Roosevelt, Forbes, Whitney, Morgans, and Harrimans are historically Mainline Protestant families.

According to Scientific Elite: Nobel Laureates in the United States by Harriet Zuckerman, a review of American Nobel prizes winners awarded between 1901 and 1972, 72% of American Nobel Prize laureates, have identified from a Protestant background. Overall, 84.2% of all the Nobel Prizes awarded to Americans in Chemistry, 60% in Medicine, and 58.6% in Physics between 1901 and 1972 were won by Protestants.

Some of the first colleges and universities in America, including Harvard, Yale, Princeton, Columbia, Dartmouth, Williams, Bowdoin, Middlebury, and Amherst, all were founded by the Mainline Protestants, as were later Carleton, Duke, Oberlin, Beloit, Pomona, Rollins and Colorado College. Most of these schools, however, identify themselves as independent and non-sectarian institutions, having no juridical ties to formal religion.

Many mainline denominations teach that the Bible is God's word in function, but tend to be open to new ideas and societal changes. They have been increasingly open to the ordination of women.

Mainline churches tend to belong to organizations such as the National Council of Churches and World Council of Churches.

The seven largest U.S. mainline Protestant denominations were called by William Hutchison the "Seven Sisters of American Protestantism" in reference to the major liberal groups during the period between 1900 and 1960.

These include:

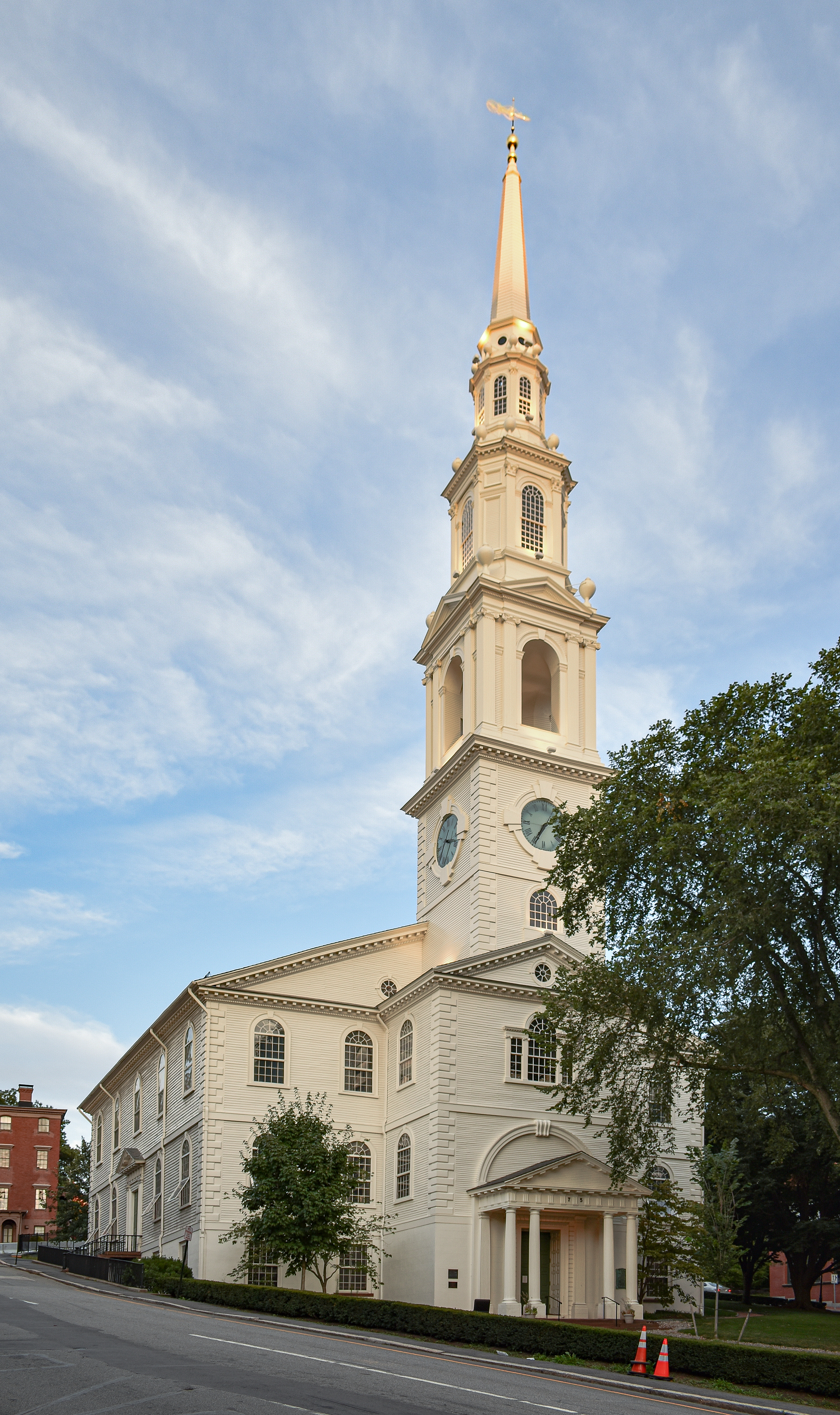
The First Baptist Church in America in Providence, Rhode Island (American Baptist Churches USA)

- United Methodist Church: 3,809,543 members (2025)
- Evangelical Lutheran Church in America: 2,588,700 members (2025)
- Episcopal Church in the United States of America: 1,394,769 active baptized members (2023)
- American Baptist Churches in the USA: 1,145,647 members (2017)
- Presbyterian Church (USA): 1,019,003 active members (2025)
- United Church of Christ: 712,296 members (2022)
- Christian Church (Disciples of Christ): 277,864 (2022)

The Association of Religion Data Archives also considers these denominations to be mainline:

- Religious Society of Friends (Quakers): 108,500 members
- Reformed Church in America: 84,957 members (2023)
- International Council of Community Churches: 68,300 members (2010)
- National Association of Congregational Christian Churches: 65,569 members (2000)
- North American Baptist Conference: 47,150 members (2006)
- Moravian Church in America, Southern Province: 21,513 members (1991)
- Moravian Church in America, Northern Province: 20,220 members (2010)
- Universal Fellowship of Metropolitan Community Churches: 15,666 members (2006)
- Latvian Evangelical Lutheran Church in America: 12,000 members (2007)
- Congregational Christian Churches (not part of any national CCC body)
- Moravian Church in America, Alaska Province

The Association of Religion Data Archives has difficulties collecting data on traditionally African American denominations. Those churches most likely to be identified as mainline include these Methodist groups:

- African Methodist Episcopal Church
- Christian Methodist Episcopal Church

The Malankara Mar Thoma Syrian Church, an Oriental Protestant body in the Saint Thomas Christian tradition, also has congregations in the United States. This church is in full communion with the Anglican Communion. Hence, the Association of Religion Data Archives groups the Mar Thoma Church with Anglican churches.

=== Catholicism ===
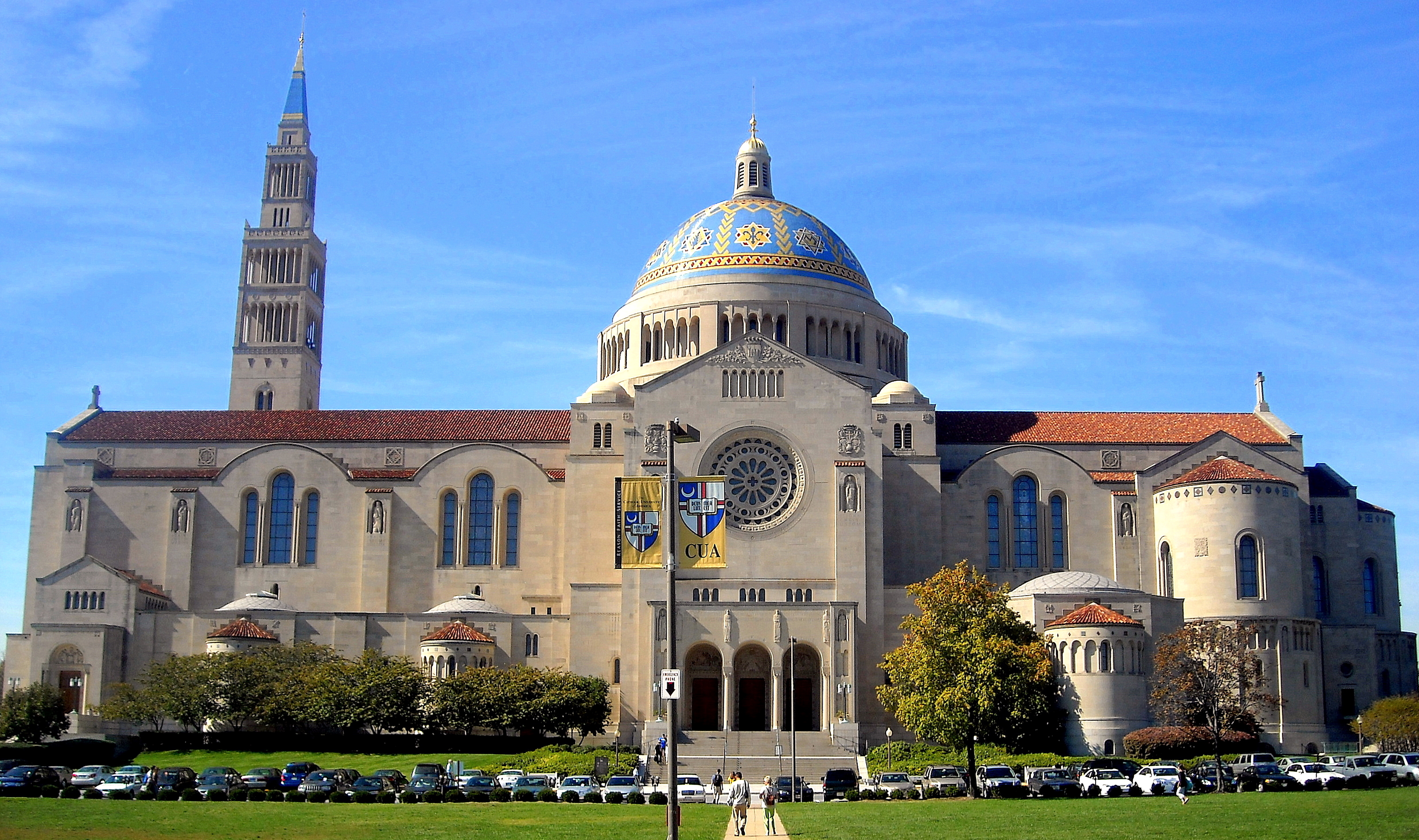
The Basilica of the National Shrine of the Immaculate Conception in Washington, D.C. is the largest Catholic church in the United States.

The Catholic Church arrived in what is now the continental United States during the earliest days of the European colonization of the Americas. It secured and established itself formally as early as 1565, with the establishment of the first Catholic parish of the United States at St. Augustine, Florida. It spread in the 1600s through missionaries including Jesuit missionaries like Eusebio Kino, Jacques Marquette, Isaac Jogues and Andrew White. At the time the country was founded (meaning the Thirteen Colonies in 1776, along the Atlantic seaboard), only a small fraction of the population there were Catholic, mostly in Maryland, a "Catholic Proprietary," established in 1634 by the second Lord Baltimore, Cecilius Calvert, 2nd Baron Baltimore; however, as a result of expansion in former French, Spanish and Mexican (i.e., purchase of Louisiana Territory, of Florida, the acquisition of territory after the Mexican–American War) territories, and immigration over the country's history, the number of adherents has grown dramatically and it is now the largest denomination in the United States today. With over 67 million registered residents professing the faith in 2008, the United States has the fourth largest Catholic population in the world after Brazil, Mexico, and the Philippines, respectively.

The Church's leadership body in the United States is the United States Conference of Catholic Bishops, made up of the hierarchy of bishops and archbishops of the United States and the U.S. Virgin Islands, although each bishop is independent in his own diocese, answerable only to the Pope.

No primate for Catholics exists in the United States. The Archdiocese of Baltimore has Prerogative of Place, which confers to its archbishop a subset of the leadership responsibilities granted to primates in other countries, possibly because at the time it was created an archdiocese (and metropolitan see) in 1808, four newly created dioceses (Boston, New York, Bardstown [KY], and Philadelphia) were subject to it. In addition, the "principal determining elements in the character of American Catholicism" seemed to coalesce under the leadership of Archbishop John Carroll of Baltimore (the first bishop of the United States, consecrated in London, 1790) and his native Maryland Catholics, descendants of the original Catholic families of Maryland's Catholic Proprietary. In this regard, Baltimore had, among other things, a "prerogative of place," both historically and culturally, in the American Catholic mind and in Rome. This would change, of course, with immigration and the acquisition of new territories that currently make up continental U.S. However, the openness of Carroll to the American experiment. As early as 1784, he "wholeheartedly" affirmed the pattern of church-state relations then emerging in the new country, later to be incorporated into the Constitution. He also praised the promise which civil and religious liberty held out for all denominations, noting in an address to Catholics (Annapolis, MD), that "if we have the wisdom and temper to preserve, America may come to exhibit a proof to the world, that general and equal toleration, by giving a free circulation to fair argument, is the most effectual method to bring all denominations of Christians to a unity of faith."

The number of Catholics grew from the early 19th century through immigration and the acquisition of the predominantly Catholic former possessions of France, Spain, and Mexico, followed in the mid-19th century by a rapid influx of Irish, German, Italian and Polish immigrants from Europe, making Catholicism the largest Christian denomination in the United States. This increase was met by widespread prejudice and hostility, often resulting in riots and the burning of churches, convents, and seminaries. The integration of Catholics into American society was marked by the election of John F. Kennedy as the first Catholic president in 1960. Since then, the percentage of Americans who are Catholic has remained at around 25%.

According to the Association of Catholic Colleges and Universities in 2011, there are approximately 230 Roman Catholic universities and colleges in the United States with nearly 1 million students and some 65,000 professors. 12 Catholic universities are listed among the top 100 national universities in the US. Catholic schools educate 2.7 million students in the United States, employing 150,000 teachers. In 2002, Catholic health care systems, overseeing 625 hospitals with a combined revenue of 30 billion dollars, comprised the nation's largest group of nonprofit systems.

=== Eastern Orthodoxy ===
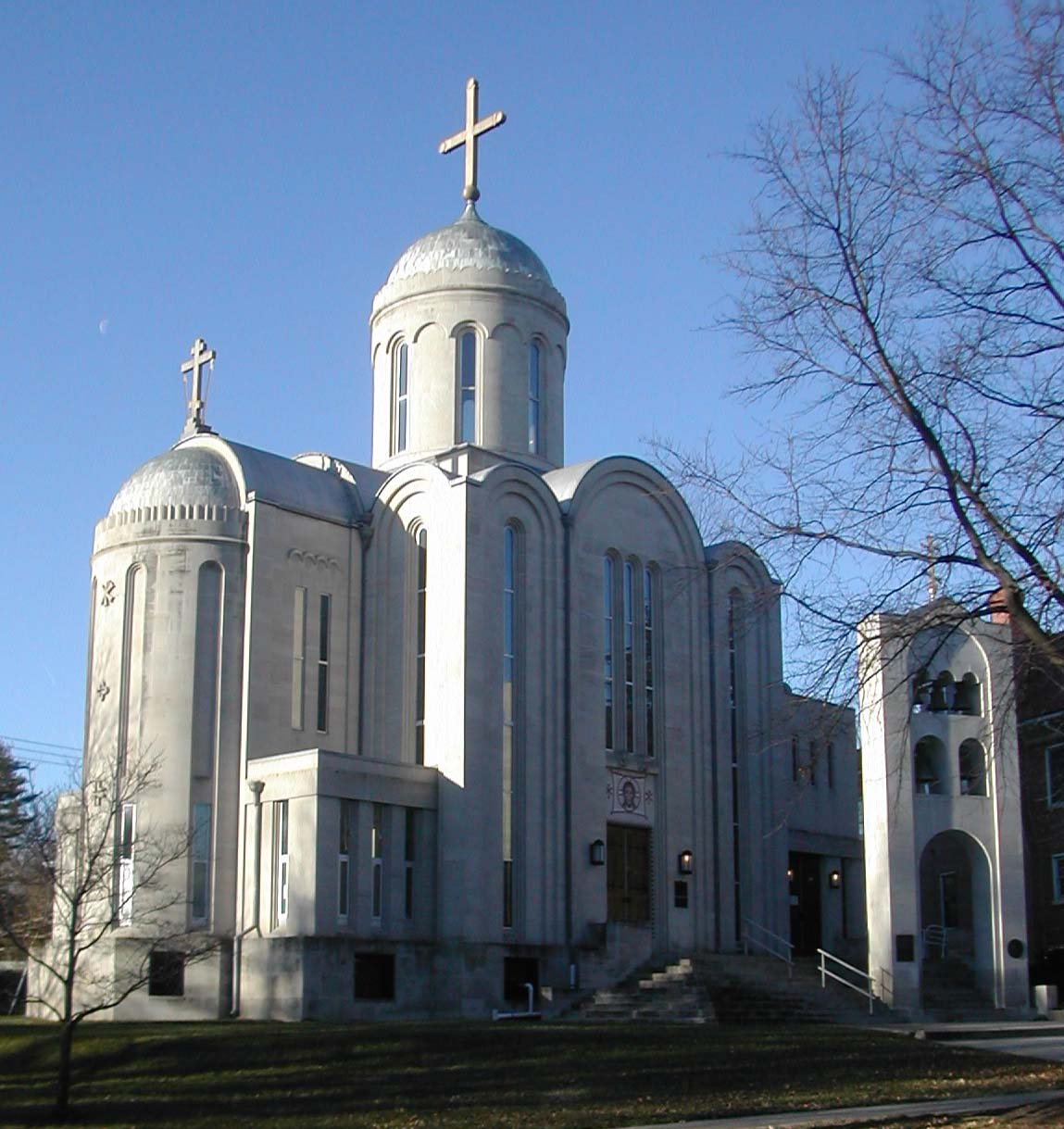
St. Nicholas Cathedral in Washington, D.C., is the primary cathedral of the Orthodox Church in America.

Groups of immigrants from several different regions, mainly Eastern Europe and the Middle East, brought Eastern Orthodoxy to the United States. This traditional branch of Eastern Christianity has since spread beyond the boundaries of ethnic immigrant communities and now include multi-ethnic membership and parishes. Currently, there are between 6 and 7 million Eastern Christians in the United States of America. There are several Eastern Orthodox ecclesiastical jurisdictions in the US, organized within the Assembly of Canonical Orthodox Bishops of the United States of America. Statistically, Eastern Orthodox Christians are among the wealthiest Christian denominations in the United States, and they also tend to be better educated than most other religious groups in America, in the sense that they have a high number of graduate (68%) and post-graduate degrees (28%) per capita.

=== Oriental Orthodoxy ===
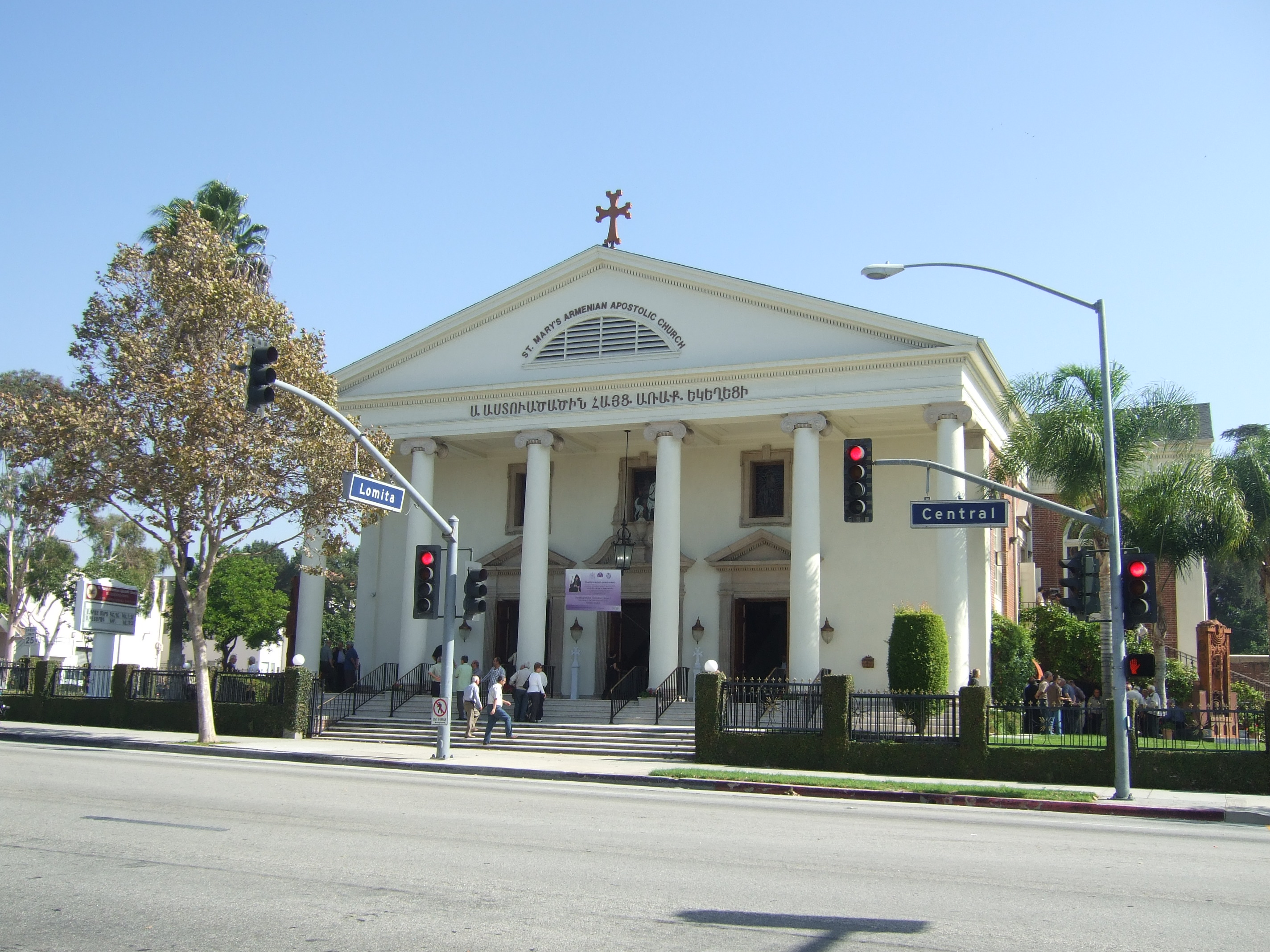
Saint Mary's Armenian Apostolic Church in Glendale, California

Several groups of Christian immigrants, mainly from the Middle East, Caucasus, Africa and India, brought Oriental Orthodoxy to the United States.

This ancient branch of Eastern Christianity includes several ecclesiastical jurisdictions in the US, including the Armenian Apostolic Church in the United States, the Coptic Orthodox Church in the United States, the Ethiopian Orthodox Church, the Eritrean Orthodox Church, the Syriac Orthodox Church, and the Malankara Orthodox Syrian Church.

=== Latter Day Saint movement ===
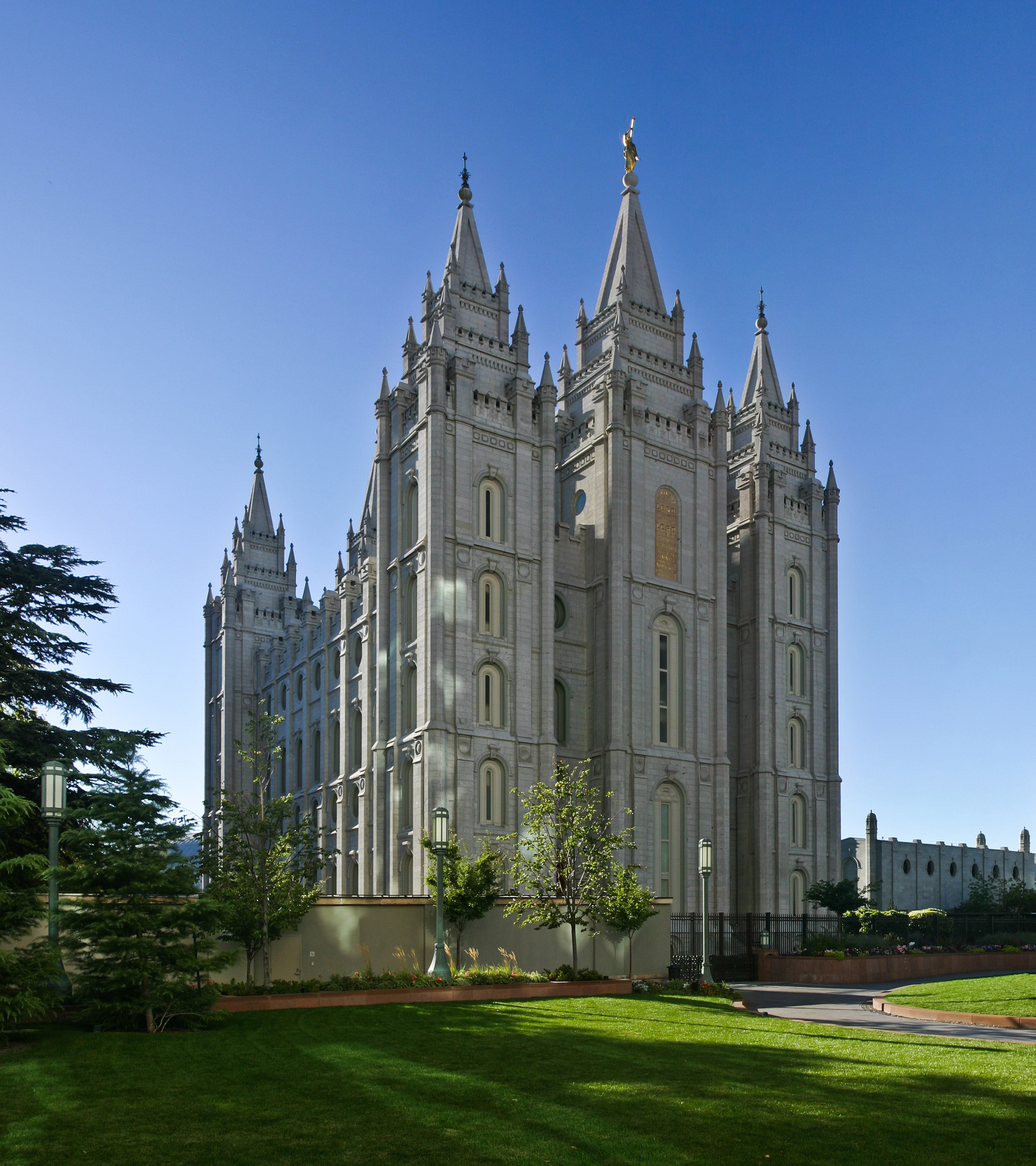
The Salt Lake Temple, which took 40 years to build, is one of the most iconic images of The Church of Jesus Christ of Latter-day Saints.

The Church of Jesus Christ of Latter-day Saints is a nontrinitarian restorationist denomination. The church is headquartered in Salt Lake City, and is the largest originating from the Latter Day Saint movement which was founded by Joseph Smith in Upstate New York in 1830. It forms the majority in Utah, the plurality in Idaho, and high percentages in Nevada, Arizona, and Wyoming; in addition to sizable numbers in Colorado, Montana, Washington, Oregon, Alaska, Hawaii and California. Current membership in the U.S. is 6.7 million and total membership is 16.7 million worldwide, as of December 2020.

In 2021, around 12–13% of Latter-day Saints lived in Utah, the center of cultural influence for the Latter Day Saint movement. Utah Latter-day Saints (as well as Latter-day Saints living in the Intermountain West) are on average more culturally and politically conservative and Libertarian than those living in some cosmopolitan centers elsewhere in the U.S. Utahns self-identifying as Latter-day Saints also attend church somewhat more on average than Latter-day Saints living in other states. (Nonetheless, whether they live in Utah or elsewhere in the U.S., Latter-day Saints tend to be more culturally and politically conservative than members of other U.S. religious groups.) Utah Latter-day Saints often place a greater emphasis on pioneer heritage than international Latter-day Saints who generally are not descendants of the early Latter-day Saint pioneers.

Community of Christ (formerly the Reorganized Church of Jesus Christ of Latter Day Saints) is a trinitarian restorationist denomination based in Independence, Missouri, at the theologically significant Temple Lot. Community of Christ is the second largest denomination in the Latter Day Saint movement with 130,000 members in the United States and 250,000 worldwide (See Community of Christ membership statistics). The church owns some of the early Latter Day Saint historic sites and documents, and prior to March 2024 also owned the Kirtland Temple, near Cleveland, Ohio, and most of the Joseph Smith properties in Nauvoo, Illinois. Community of Christ has taken an ecumenical and progressive approach recent years including joining the National Council of Churches, ordaining women to the church's priesthood since 1984, and more recently approving the blessing of same-sex marriages.

Small churches within the Latter Day Saint movement include Church of Christ (Temple Lot), Fundamentalist Church of Jesus Christ of Latter-Day Saints, Restoration Branches, and Remnant Church of Jesus Christ of Latter Day Saints.

== Youth programs ==
While children and youth in the colonial era were treated as small adults, awareness of their special status and needs grew in the nineteenth century, as one after another the denominations large and small began special programs for their young people. Protestant theologian Horace Bushnell in Christian Nurture (1847) emphasized the necessity of identifying and supporting the religiosity of children and young adults. Beginning in the 1790s the Protestant denominations set up Sunday school programs. They provided a major source of new members. Urban Protestant churchmen set up the interdenominational YMCA (and later the YWCA) programs in cities from the 1850s. Methodists looked on their youth as potential political activists, providing them with opportunities to engage in social justice movements such as prohibition. Black Protestants, especially after they could form their own separate churches, integrated their young people directly into the larger religious community. Their youth played a major role in the leadership of the Civil Rights Movement of the 1950s and the 1960s. White evangelicals in the twentieth century set up Bible clubs for teenagers and experimented with the use of music to attract young people. The Catholics set up an entire network of parochial schools, and by the late nineteenth century probably more than half of their young members were attending elementary schools run by local parishes. Some Missouri Synod German Lutherans and Dutch Reformed churches also set up parochial schools. In the twentieth century, all the denominations sponsored programs such as the Boy Scouts and Girl Scouts.

== Demographics ==
=== Demographics by state ===

<30%	<40%	<50%	>50%
				Catholic
				Baptist
				Methodist
				Lutheran
				Latter Day Saints
				No religion

=== Beliefs and attitudes ===
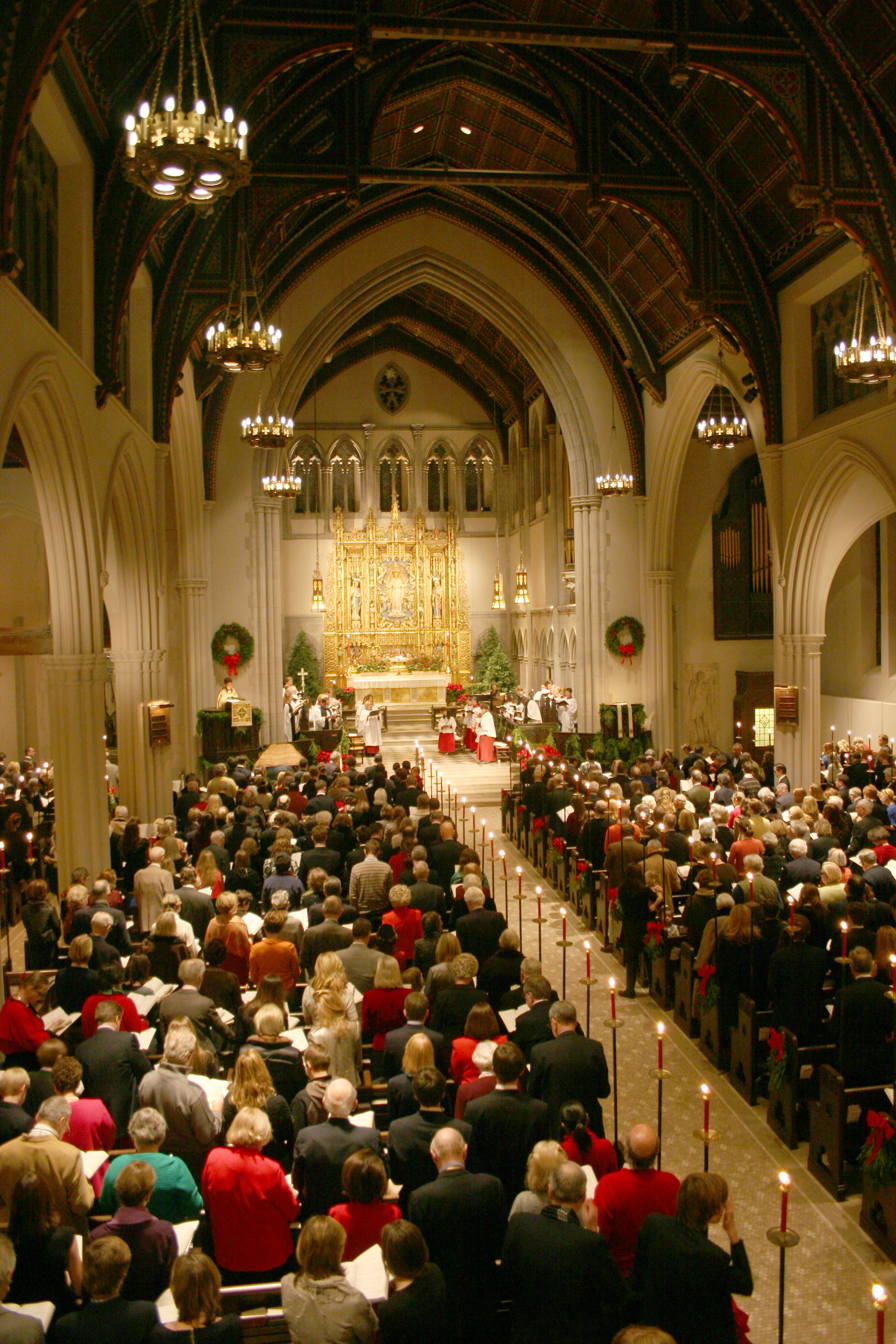
Christmas Eve services at St. James' Church in Manhattan

The Baylor University Institute for Studies of Religion conducted a survey covering various aspects of American religious life. The researchers analyzing the survey results have categorized the responses into what they call the "four Gods": An authoritarian God (31%), a benevolent God (25%), a distant God (23%), and a critical God (16%). A major implication to emerge from this survey is that "the type of god people believe in can predict their political and moral attitudes more so than just looking at their religious tradition."

As far as religious tradition, the survey determined that 33.6% of respondents are evangelical Protestants, while 10.8% had no religious affiliation at all. Out of those without affiliation, 62.9% still indicated that they "believe in God or some higher power".

Another study, conducted by Christianity Today with Leadership magazine, attempted to understand the range and differences among American Christians. A national attitudinal and behavioral survey found that their beliefs and practices clustered into five distinct segments. Spiritual growth for two large segments of Christians may be occurring in non-traditional ways. Instead of attending church on Sunday mornings, many opt for personal, individual ways to stretch themselves spiritually.

- 19 percent of American Christians are described by the researchers as Active Christians. They believe salvation comes through Jesus Christ, attend church regularly, are Bible readers, invest in personal faith development through their church, accept leadership positions in their church, and believe they are obligated to "share [their] faith", that is, to evangelize others.
- 20 percent are referred to as Professing Christians. They are also committed to "accepting Christ as Savior and Lord" as the key to being a Christian, but focus more on personal relationships with God and Jesus than on church, Bible reading or evangelizing.
- 16 percent fall into a category named Liturgical Christians. They are predominantly Lutheran, Catholic, Episcopalian, Eastern Orthodox or Oriental Orthodox. They are regular churchgoers, have a high level of spiritual activity and recognize the authority of the church.
- 24 percent are considered Private Christians. They own a Bible but do not tend to read it. Only about one-third attend church at all. They believe in God and in doing good things, but not necessarily within a church context. This was the largest and youngest segment. Almost none are church leaders.
- 21 percent in the research are called Cultural Christians. These do not view Jesus as essential to salvation. They exhibit little outward religious behavior or attitudes. They favor a universality theology that sees many ways to God. Yet, they clearly consider themselves to be Christians.

=== Church attendance ===
Gallup International indicates that 41% of American citizens report they regularly attend religious services, compared to 15% of French citizens, 10% of British citizens, and 7.5% of Australian citizens.

The Bible Belt is an informal term for a region in the Southern United States in which socially conservative evangelical Protestantism is a significant part of the culture and Christian church attendance across the denominations is generally higher than the nation's average. By contrast, religion plays the least important role in New England and in the Western United States.

==== By state ====
Percent of Americans who report attending religious services at least weekly in 2014. ≥50% attending weekly 45-49% attending weekly 40-44% attending weekly 35-39% attending weekly 30-34% attending weekly 25-29% attending weekly 20-24% attending weekly 15-19% attending weekly

Church attendance varies significantly by state and region. In a 2014 Gallup survey, less than half of Americans said that they attended church or synagogue weekly. The figures ranged from 51% in Utah to 17% in Vermont.

Weekly church attendance by state
Rank	State	Percent
1	Utah	51%
2	Mississippi	47%
3	Alabama	46%
4	Louisiana	46%
5	Arkansas	45%
6	South Carolina	42%
7	Tennessee	42%
8	Kentucky	41%
9	North Carolina	40%
10	Georgia	39%
11	Oklahoma	39%
12	Texas	39%
13	New Mexico	36%
14	Delaware	35%
15	Indiana	35%
16	Missouri	35%
17	Nebraska	35%
18	Virginia	35%
19	Idaho	34%
20	West Virginia	34%
21	Arizona	33%
22	Kansas	33%
23	Florida	32%
24	Illinois	32%
25	Iowa	32%
26	Michigan	32%
27	North Dakota	32%
28	Ohio	32%
29	Pennsylvania	32%
30	Maryland	31%
31	Minnesota	31%
32	South Dakota	31%
33	New Jersey	30%
34	Wisconsin	29%
35	California	28%
36	Rhode Island	28%
37	Wyoming	28%
38	Montana	27%
39	Nevada	27%
40	New York	27%
41	Alaska	26%
42	Colorado	25%
43	Connecticut	25%
44	Hawaii	25%
45	Oregon	24%
46	Washington	24%
—	District of Columbia	23%
47	Massachusetts	22%
48	Maine	20%
49	New Hampshire	20%
50	Vermont	17%

=== U.S. territories ===
Below is the percent of population that are Christians in the U.S. territories in 2015.

Territory	Percent Christian
American Samoa	87.4%
Guam	91.1%
Northern Mariana Islands	81.1%
Puerto Rico	91.2%
U.S. Virgin Islands	81.8%

=== Race ===
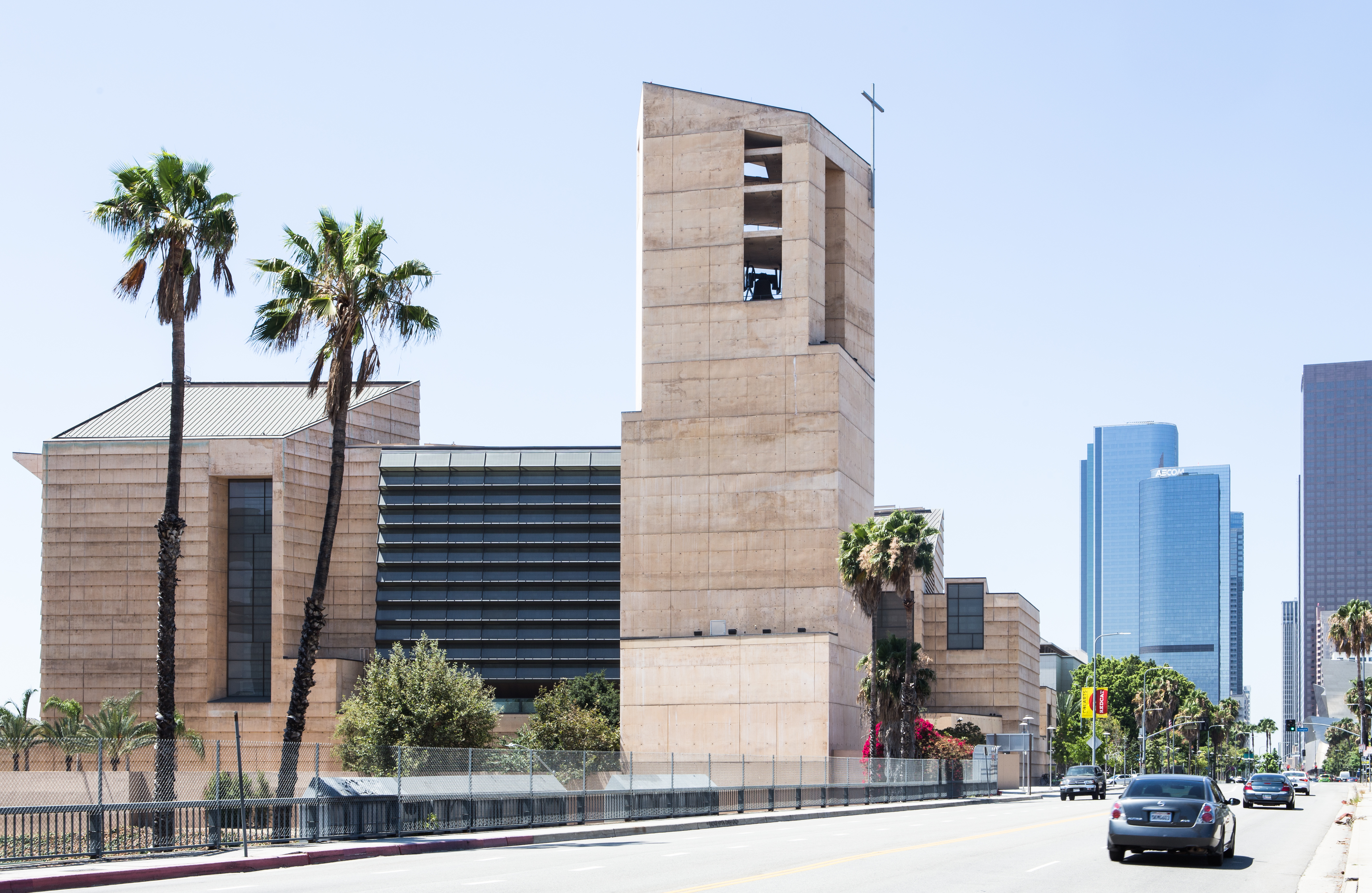
Cathedral of Our Lady of the Angels in Los Angeles

Data from the Pew Research Center show that as of 2008, the majority of White Americans were Christian, and about 51% of the White American were Protestant, and 26% were Catholic.

The most methodologically rigorous study of Hispanic and Latino Americans religious affiliation to date was the Hispanic Churches in American Public Life (HCAPL) National Survey, conducted between August and October 2000. This survey found that 70% of all Hispanic and Latino Americans are Catholic, 20% are Protestant, 3% are "alternative Christians" (such as Latter Day Saints or Jehovah's Witnesses). According to a Public Religion Research Institute study in 2017, the majority of Hispanic and Latino Americans are Christians (76%), and about 11% of Americans identify as Hispanic or Latino Christian.

The majority of African Americans are Protestant (78%), many of whom follow the historically black churches. A 2012 Pew Research Center study found that 42% of Asian Americans identify themselves as Christians.

=== Ethnicity ===
Beginning around 1600, Northern European settlers introduced Anglican and Puritan religion, as well as Baptist, Presbyterian, Lutheran, Quaker, and Moravian denominations.

Beginning in the 16th century, the Spanish (and later the French and English) introduced Catholicism. From the 19th century to the present, Catholics came to the US in large numbers due to the immigration of Irish, Germans, Italians, Hispanics, Portuguese, French, Polish, Hungarians, Lebanese (Maronite), and other ethnic groups.

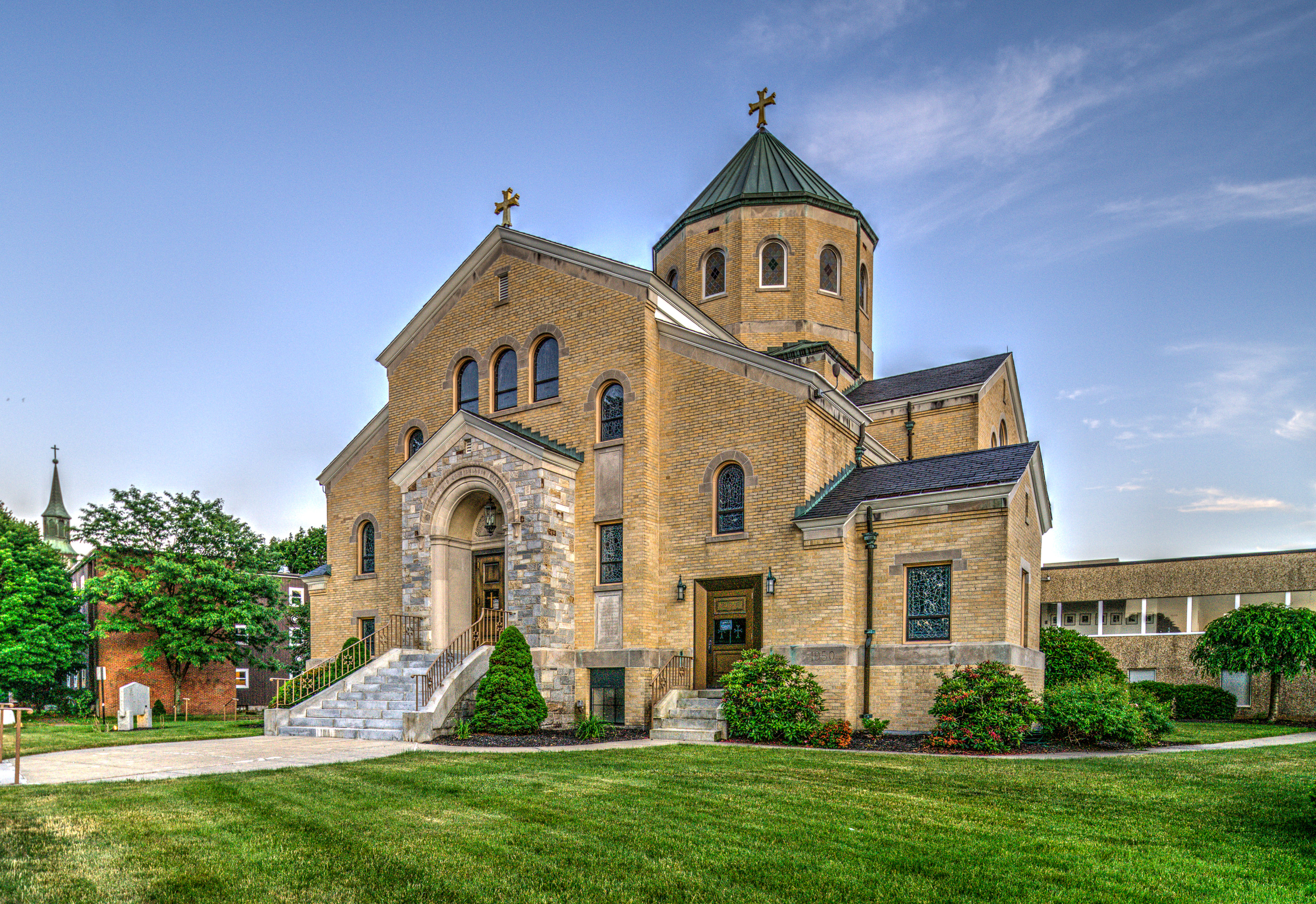
Armenian Apostolic Church of Our Savior, Worcester

Most of the Eastern Orthodox adherents in the United States are descended from immigrants of Eastern European or Middle Eastern background, especially from Greek, Russian, Ukrainian, Arab, Bulgarian, Romanian, or Serbian backgrounds. With a significant minority being Alaska Natives.

Most of the Oriental Orthodox adherents in the United States are from Armenian, Coptic-Egyptian and Ethiopian-Eritrean backgrounds.

Along with the Ethiopian-Eritrean Christians also came the P'ent'ay Evangelical Churches, a part of Evangelicalism that maintains the Eastern Christian Calendar and other cultural traditions.

Most of the traditional Church of the East adherents in the United States are ethnically Assyrian.

Data from the Pew Research Center show that as of 2013, there were about 1.6 million Christians from Jewish background, most of them Protestant. According to the same data, most of the Christians of Jewish descent were raised as Jews or are Jews by ancestry.

=== Education ===
According to a 2017 study by the Pew Research Center, highly educated Christians in the United States are a few percentage points more likely to attend church than those with lower education levels. As a whole, Americans who have obtained college degrees attend religious services at the same rate as those who do not have them. Moreover, 75% of recent college graduates identify with an organized religion. On a scale measuring levels of religious commitment, over 70% of Christians in the United States who are educated demonstrate high levels of religiosity. Specifically, among Evangelical Christians, 87% of college graduates have high levels of religiosity as do 62% of college graduates who identify as Catholic Christians, 54% of mainline Protestants and 89% of Black Protestants. Highly educated church members of the Church of Jesus Christ of Latter-day Saints have a far greater level of religious commitment (92%) compared to those who only graduated from high school (78%).

=== Conversion ===
A study from 2015 estimated some 450,000 American Muslims had converted to Christianity, most of whom belong to an evangelical or Pentecostal community. In 2010 there were approximately 180,000 Arab-Americans and about 130,000 Iranian Americans who converted from Islam to Christianity. Dudley Woodbury, a Fulbright scholar of Islam, estimates that 20,000 Muslims convert to Christianity annually in the United States. Many Druze immigrants to the United States converted to Protestantism, becoming communicants of the Presbyterian or Methodist Churches.

It's been also reported that conversion into Christianity is significantly increasing among Korean Americans, Chinese Americans, and Japanese Americans. By 2012, the percentage of Christians within the mentioned communities was 71%, more than 30% and 37%.

Messianic Judaism (or Messianic Movement) is the name of a Protestant movement comprising a number of streams, whose members may consider themselves Jewish. It blends elements of religious Jewish practice with evangelical Protestantism. Messianic Judaism affirms Christian creeds such as the messiahship and divinity of "Yeshua" (the Hebrew name of Jesus) and the Triune Nature of God, while also adhering to some Jewish dietary laws and customs. As of 2012, population estimates for the United States were between 175,000 and 250,000 members.

A 2013 Pew Research Center report found that 1.7 million American Jewish adults, 1.6 million of whom were raised in Jewish homes or had Jewish ancestry, identified as Christians or Messianic Jews but also consider themselves ethnically Jewish. According to a 2020 study by the Pew Research Center, 19% of those who say they were raised Jewish, consider themselves Christian.

== Self-reported membership statistics ==
This table lists total membership and number of congregations in the United States for religious bodies with more than 1 million members. Numbers are from reports on the official web sites, which can vary widely based on information source and membership definition.

Self-reported U.S. church denomination membership
Denomination	Membership	Congregations	Headquarters	Communion
Catholic Church in the United States	71,000,000	17,156	Washington, D.C. (United States Conference of Catholic Bishops)	Catholic Church (Holy See)
Southern Baptist Convention	12,331,954	46,608	Various entities are headquartered in Nashville, Tennessee, Alpharetta, Georgia, and Richmond, Virginia.	Baptist World Alliance (partially)
National Baptist Convention, USA, Inc.	7,500,000	21,145	Montgomery, Alabama	Baptist World Alliance
The Church of Jesus Christ of Latter-day Saints	7,004,864	14,459	Salt Lake City, Utah	None (operates worldwide)
United Methodist Church	5,714,815	31,609	Without fixed seat. The temporary headquarters is the city where the General Conference takes place, with the event taking place only every 4 years.	World Methodist Council
Church of God in Christ	5,499,875	12,000	Memphis, Tennessee	Is not a member of any communion (but operate worldwide)
National Baptist Convention of America, Inc.	3,106,000	12,336	Louisville, Kentucky	Baptist World Alliance
Assemblies of God USA	2,932,466	12,830	Springfield, Missouri	World Assemblies of God Fellowship
Evangelical Lutheran Church in America	2,904,686	8,640	Chicago, Illinois	Lutheran World Federation
African Methodist Episcopal Church	2,510,000	7,000	Nashville, Tennessee	World Methodist Council
Lutheran Church–Missouri Synod	1,968,641	6,046	Kirkwood, Missouri	International Lutheran Council
Baptist General Convention of Texas	1,669,245	4,242	Dallas, Texas	Baptist World Alliance
Episcopal Church (United States)	1,576,702	6,355	New York, New York	Anglican Communion
Progressive National Baptist Convention	1,500,000	1,200	Washington, D.C.	Baptist World Alliance
Greek Orthodox Archdiocese of America	1,500,000	540	New York, New York	Eastern Orthodox Church
African Methodist Episcopal Zion Church	1,432,795	3,226	Charlotte, North Carolina	In communion with other Methodist churches
Pentecostal Assemblies of the World	1,300,000	1,750	Indianapolis, Indiana	Is not a member of any communion
Jehovah's Witnesses	1,237,054	12,594	Warwick, New York	Is not a member of any communion (but operate worldwide)
Baptist Bible Fellowship International	1,200,000	4,500	Springfield, Missouri	Is not a member of any communion
American Baptist Churches USA	1,186,416	5,123	Valley Forge, Pennsylvania	Baptist World Alliance
Seventh-day Adventist Church	1,166,672	5,134	Silver Spring, Maryland	Is not a member of any communion (but operate worldwide)
Presbyterian Church (USA)	1,140,665	8,705	Louisville, Kentucky	World Communion of Reformed Churches
Churches of Christ	1,112,935	11,905	None	Is a loose association of autonomous congregations

== See also ==
- Christian nationalism
- Christian nationalism in the United States
- Christian support of Donald Trump
- Religion and politics in the United States
- Christian amendment – Proposed U.S. Constitutional amendments
- Establishment Clause
- House Bill 71 – 2024 Louisiana law directing schools to display the Ten Commandments
- Demographics of the United States
- History of religion in the United States
- Religion in the United States
- Yearbook of American and Canadian Churches

== Sources ==
- Ariel, Yaakov (2000). Evangelizing the Chosen People: Missions to the Jews in America, 1880–2000. Chapel Hill, NC; London: University of North Carolina Press. ISBN 0-8078-2566-2. OCLC 43708450.
- Finke, Roger; Stark, Rodney (2005). The Churching of America, 1776–2005: Winners and Losers in Our Religious Economy. New Brunswick, NJ; London: Rutgers University Press. ISBN 0-8135-3553-0.
- FitzGerald, Thomas (2007). "Eastern Christianity in the United States". The Blackwell Companion to Eastern Christianity. Malden, Ma: Blackwell Press. pp. 269–279. ISBN 9780470766392.
- Lindner, Eileen W., ed. (February 14, 2011). Yearbook of American & Canadian Churches. National Council of Churches. (overview)
- Lindner, Eileen W., ed. (2012). Yearbook of American & Canadian Churches. National Council of Churches. (overview)
- Mauss, Armand L. (1994). The Angel and the Beehive: The Mormon Struggle with Assimilation. Urbana, Il; Chicago: University of Illinois Press. ISBN 0-252-02071-5.
- Szasz, Margaret (2007). Indian Education in the American Colonies, 1607-1783. University of Nebraska Press. ISBN 978-0-8032-5966-9.
