= National Council of Churches =

Ecumenical body in the United States

- Founded: November 28–December 1, 1950
- Headquarters: Washington, DC
- Members: 38 denominations with approx. 40 million members
- Website: nationalcouncilofchurches.us

The National Council of the Churches of Christ in the USA, usually identified as the National Council of Churches (NCC), is the largest ecumenical body in the United States. NCC is an ecumenical partnership of 38 Christian faith groups in the United States. Its member communions include mainline Protestant, Eastern Orthodox, Oriental Orthodox, African-American, evangelical, and historic peace churches. Together, it encompasses more than 100,000 local congregations and 40 million adherents. It began as the Federal Council of Churches in 1908, and expanded through merger with several other ecumenical organizations to become the National Council of Churches in 1950. Its interim president and general secretary is Bishop Vashti Murphy McKenzie.

== History ==
The first efforts at ecumenical organization emerged in May 1908 with the creation of the Federal Council of Churches (FCC). The FCC was created as a response to "industrial problems" that arose during the rapid industrialization of the United States. The primary concern was the protection of workers in a host of areas including wages, working conditions, child labor, and a six-day work week (reduced from seven).

During the next 40 plus years, FCC remained engaged in the domestic social problems of the day as well as international problems that threatened to draw the US into war. Its progressive social program along with support of conscientious objectors to World War II garnered stiff criticism from Christian fundamentalist circles. By 1950, numerous programs and efforts of social uplift had formed in addition to the FCC. Seeking greater unity, a dozen ecumenical bodies (including the FCC) gathered in Cleveland, Ohio, in 1950 to discuss how to more effectively organize their common work. Out of this meeting, via the merger of the Federal Council of Churches with several other ecumenical bodies, emerged the NCC.

During the late 1950s and early 1960s (it is unclear from the reference how long this continued), the National Council of Churches received some funding from the "Foundation for Youth and Student Affairs", a front funded by the CIA to oppose communism.

== Membership ==
The council's 38 member communions include mainline Protestant, Eastern Orthodox, African-American, evangelical, and historic peace churches, in addition to one Mormon church. Individual adherents of more than 50 Christian faith groups actively participate in NCC study groups, commissions, and ministries. Some of these participants belong to Christian faith groups such as the Catholic Church, fundamentalist groups, Southern Baptists, and Missouri Synod Lutherans, which are not officially a part of the council's membership.

All NCC member organizations subscribe to the NCC's statement of faith, which forms the preamble to the NCC's charter:

The National Council of Churches is a community of Christian communions, which, in response to the gospel as revealed in the Scriptures, confess Jesus Christ, the incarnate Word of God, as Savior and Lord. These communions covenant with one another to manifest ever more fully the unity of the Church. Relying upon the transforming power of the Holy Spirit, the communions come together as the Council in common mission, serving in all creation to the glory of God.

== Social and political advocacy ==
=== The Social Creeds ===
Since its founding in 1950, one of the primary activities of NCC has been to effect positive change for the betterment of society. Adopted in December 1908, "The Social Creed of the Churches" was a statement by members of the Federal Council of Churches against what it described as "industrial problems". The document spelled out a list of principles, including:

- Equal rights and complete justice for all men in all stations of life
- Protection of the worker from dangerous machinery, occupational disease, injuries, and mortality
- Abolition of child labor
- Regulation of the conditions of toil for women as shall safeguard the physical and moral health of the community
- A living wage as a minimum in every industry
- Provision for the old age of the workers and for those incapacitated by injury
- Abatement of poverty

In 2007, the NCC updated its social creed to reflect a new era of globalization. The goal was to "offer a vision of a society that shares more and consumes less, seeks compassion over suspicion and equality over domination, and finds security in joined hands rather than massed arms." In addition to those areas mentioned in the 1908 creed, the "Social Creed for the 21st Century" included additional principles, including:

- System of criminal rehabilitation based on restorative justice and end to the death penalty
- Limits on the power of private interests in politics
- Just immigration policies
- Sustainable use of earth's resources
- Nuclear disarmament and redirection of military spending
- Religious dialogue
- Strengthening multilateral diplomacy, United Nations, and the rule of international law

These creeds have formed the basis, growing out of a common Christian faith, of the work of the NCC in public policy matters.

=== The NCC in Washington ===
For a number of years, the NCC maintained a separate policy advocacy office in Washington, D.C. Located in the United Methodist Building on Capitol Hill, the NCC Washington Office served as an ecumenical hub through which it could interact with the numerous denominational policy offices also located in the Methodist Building. Its work centered on areas mentioned in the creeds but also primarily focused around two programs, Eco-Justice and the Ecumenical Poverty Initiative. Both of these programs have been spun off into separate independent organizations since NCC restructuring in 2013.

NCC partners with dozens of other faith-based groups in DC and elsewhere, such as Bread for the World, Habitat for Humanity, and Children's Defense Fund, to press for broad policy initiatives that address poverty issues. The council helped launch the Let Justice Roll grassroots anti-poverty campaign that has been successful in raising the minimum wage in more than 20 states since 2005.

In 2018, the council issued a statement opposing the nomination of Brett Kavanaugh to the Supreme Court.

=== Civil rights movement ===
NCC was closely aligned with leaders in the civil rights movement, including Martin Luther King Jr. and Andrew Young. The NCC was an important link to mainline churches for the civil rights movement and it consistently condemned segregation during the Montgomery bus boycott and other actions. In a speech to NCC in 1957, King thanked the NCC for its support: "This great body—the National Council of Churches—has condemned segregation over and over again, and has requested its constituent denominations to do likewise."

The NCC continued to be closely intertwined with the civil rights movement throughout the 1950s and 1960s. NCC created a Race Relations Sunday to educate and call to action mainline Christians nationwide. In 1961, Andrew Young left his position with the National Council of Churches to join the Southern Christian Leadership Conference, eventually becoming that organization's executive director. When the Civil Rights Act was introduced in 1964, NCC lobbied heavily for its swift adoption. In January 1963, the NCC together with the Synagogue Council of America and the National Catholic Welfare Conference, convened the National Conference on Religion and Race, which issued An Appeal to the Conscience of the American People for a moral end to racism. From 1966 until 1973 Olivia P. Stokes was associate director of urban education in the NCC's Department of Educational Development, developing the Black Curriculum Resource Center. W. Sterling Cary, the first Black president of the NCC who was elected in 1972, was a vocal advocate for racial justice and the Black Power movement.

=== Vietnam War ===
Since its inception, the NCC had been skeptical of the usefulness of war. During World War II, the Federal Council of Churches formed a Committee on Conscientious Objectors to advocate for the right of people of faith to refuse military service. During the Vietnam War, the NCC found itself in opposition to growing US military action. In 1965, the General Board stated that "unilateral action by the United States in Southeast Asia will not lead to peace." The NCC's position against the Vietnam War became increasingly strident in the 1960s and 1970s, and in some cases, alienated the laity of some member communions.

=== Middle East peace ===
NCC has been a consistent supporter of a negotiated solution to the Israeli–Palestinian conflict. In partnership with the World Council of Churches, it has traditionally sought to balance its approach, seeking safety and protection for both the Jewish and Palestinian communities. It has focused on meeting needs of the victims of this conflict in all communities and supporting continued negotiations. Since the late 1960s the NCC has taken positions sympathetic towards Palestinian land rights and supportive of a secure Israel.

More recently, NCC has been particularly concerned with the plight of Christian communities in the region. Some of NCC's member communions have congregations or partners in the region that are being directly affected. However, the NCC's "witness to the need for vigilance in brokering peace extends to our concern for all people in the region, whether they be Christians, Jews, Muslims, Baháʼís or others, and whether they be Israelis, Palestinians, Syrians, Egyptians, or others."

=== Poverty ===
The council has supported many poverty alleviation efforts, including increases to the minimum wage and ecumenical efforts such as the Circle of Protection and the Faithful Budget Campaign. In 2013, during restructuring, NCC spun off its department dealing with poverty issues into a new organization, the Ecumenical Poverty Initiative. NCC continues its work on poverty through its support of EPI as well as partnerships with other likeminded organizations.

=== Environment ===
During the oil crisis of the 1970s, NCC issued a statement in which it called for "Ecological Justice". The statement called for more work on renewable energy, reductions in energy sources that pollute, and support for energy sources that did not have adverse effects on communities (health, economic, etc.). This statement helped form the basis for the creation of the NCC's Eco-Justice program. Housed in the NCC Washington Office, the program focused on federal environmental policy. In 2013, the Eco-Justice program was spun off into its own organization, Creation Justice Ministries. CJM continues to work with NCC and its 38 member communions to coordinate efforts to protect the environment.

=== Mass incarceration ===
NCC has taken an active role in the struggle against mass incarceration. As early as 1979, NCC recognized the problem of a justice system based on retribution and the over-representation of communities of color in the prison population. More recently, NCC has worked for sentencing reform to reduce mandatory minimum sentences, advocated for clemency for individuals who were over sentenced, and prison conditions. In addition, NCC has also broadened this work to include police reform, especially in the wake of much publicized shootings in places such as Baton Rouge, Minneapolis, and Dallas.

== Publishing and research ==
The NCC fostered the multi-denominational research effort that produced the Revised Standard Version and the New Revised Standard Version of the Bible, and holds the copyrights to both translations.

The NCC sponsors the research program on which the Uniform Sunday School Lesson Series is based. The series began in 1872 under the auspices of the National Sunday School Convention.

The NCC also published until 2012 the annual Yearbook of American and Canadian Churches, since 1916 a widely used reference work on trends, statistics and programmatic information on religious organizations in North America. Future editions of the yearbook will be published by the Association of Statisticians of American Religious Bodies (ASARB).

== Theological and ecumenical dialogue ==
The NCC is a member of the interdenominational World Council of Churches and, through the WCC, is in communication with denominations of numerous theological stances. They have released several joint statements over the years. Rev. Dr. Angelique Walker Smith of the National Baptist Convention, USA, Inc., a member church of the NCC, is the WCC's president from North America.

The NCC Faith and Order Commission is an ongoing, scholarly, ecumenical dialogue among North American Christian theologians and ecclesiastical historians, including evangelical, Pentecostal, Roman Catholic, Orthodox, mainline Protestant, and African-American scholars. In 2007, the commission celebrated its fiftieth anniversary.

== Interfaith dialogue ==
Through the "Interreligious Relations Convening Table", the NCC is in dialogue with representatives of Islam, Judaism, Hinduism, Buddhism and Sikhism.

Since 2004, the NCC aided in forming the "National Muslim-Christian Dialogue" with the Islamic Circle of North America, and the United States Council of Muslim Organizations. In addition to theological discussions, the dialogue has focused on social issues including Islamophobia in the United States. Since 2010, there has been an annual dialogue between the participants. In 2015 the interfaith dialogue participants came to 16 theological points of agreement between Christianity and Islam.

The NCC is in dialogue with the National Council of Synagogues, a partnership of Reformed, Conservative, and the Reconstructionist groups in Judaism for the purpose of interfaith affairs. The main focus of discussion between the NCC and NCS is pastoral affairs and community issues such as antisemitism. Their most recent meeting was in December of 2023. Orthodox Judaism is presently not in dialogue with the NCC.

Concerning their dialogue with Hinduism, the NCC established the "National Hindu-Christian Dialogue" in 2018. Through this dialogue, they are in discussions with the Vedanta Society of Southern California which is under the spiritual leadership of the Ramakrishna Order.

They also established the "National Buddhist-Christian Dialogue" in 2018 for discussions with those of the Buddhist faith. In addition to the NCC, participants include the Guibord Center, Fo Guang Shan Hsi Lai Temple, Claremont School of Theology, and the University of the West. Presently the dialogue is focused on bilateral understanding of the two faiths.

The "National Sikh-Christian Dialogue" was started by the NCC in 2019 and is in communication with the Sikh Council of Interfaith Relations. Recent discussions include understanding the history of persecution which impacted both faiths.

== Facilities ==
The council was the original anchor tenant in the 19-story Interchurch Center built in 1952 adjacent to Columbia University, Union Theological Seminary, and the Riverside Church in New York City. It vacated these premises in 2013 when it consolidated its offices in the building long used by its public-policy staff at 110 Maryland Avenue, NE, on Capitol Hill in Washington, D.C.

== See also ==
- Christian Churches Together
- Canadian Council of Churches
- World Council of Churches
