= List of National Council of Churches members =

This List of National Council of Churches members and observers mentions the individual communions which are members or observers of the National Council of the Churches of Christ in the USA.

Member	Denominational Tradition
African Methodist Episcopal Church	Methodist (Historically Black)
African Methodist Episcopal Zion Church	Methodist (Historically Black)
Alliance of Baptists	Baptist
American Baptist Churches USA	Baptist
Diocese of the Armenian Church of America	Oriental Orthodox
Assyrian Church of the East	Church of the East
Christian Church (Disciples of Christ)	Restorationist
Christian Methodist Episcopal Church	Methodist (Historically Black)
Church of the Brethren	Anabaptist
Community of Christ	Latter Day Saints
Coptic Orthodox Church in North America	Oriental Orthodox
Ecumenical Catholic Communion	Independent Catholic
Episcopal Church in the United States of America	Anglican
Evangelical Lutheran Church in America	Lutheran
Greek Orthodox Archdiocese of America	Eastern Orthodox
Hungarian Reformed Church in America	Reformed
International Council of Community Churches	Community Church movement
Korean Presbyterian Church Abroad	Reformed (Presbyterian)
Malankara Orthodox Syrian Church, American diocese	Oriental Orthodox
Mar Thoma Church	Reformed
Moravian Church in America	Moravian
National Baptist Convention, USA, Inc.	Baptist (Historically Black)
Orthodox Church in America	Eastern Orthodox
Patriarchal Parishes of the Russian Orthodox Church in the USA	Eastern Orthodox
Polish National Catholic Church	Catholic (Old Catholic)
Presbyterian Church (USA)	Reformed (Presbyterian)
Progressive National Baptist Convention, Inc.	Baptist (Historically Black)
Reformed Church in America	Reformed
Friends United Meeting	Quaker
Philadelphia Yearly Meeting of the Religious Society of Friends	Quaker
Serbian Orthodox Church in the US and Canada	Eastern Orthodox
Swedenborgian Church of North America	Swedenborgian
Syriac Orthodox Church of Antioch, archdiocese of the Eastern U.S.A.	Oriental Orthodox
Ukrainian Orthodox Church of the USA	Eastern Orthodox
United Church of Christ	Reformed (Congregationalist)
United Methodist Church	Methodist

Observer Status:

- Church of Christ, Scientist
