= Yearbook of American and Canadian Churches =

First published as the Federal Council Year Book in 1916, The Yearbook of American & Canadian Churches is a comprehensive descriptive and statistical listing of major religious bodies and other important religion-related organizations in the U.S. and Canada. The Yearbook contains descriptive information about the major religious bodies in the US and Canada, including features of their ecclesiology, history and theological principles, membership and financial statistics, official periodicals published by each religious group, as well as listings of each group's current officers.

The Yearbook's data serves as an authoritative source for the United States Census Bureau's ranking of largest religious groups, and for the Encyclopædia Britannica's listing of largest churches in the U.S.A. A historic archive compact disc was produced in 2000 which compiles previous editions' statistics for comparative and longitudinal analysis.

Other sections of the Yearbook list the most important church-related and para-church agencies and organizations with descriptions and contact information. Chapters also list Cooperative Organizations (e.g. American Bible Society, National Association of Evangelicals, National Council of Churches USA, etc.), Sources of Religion Related Research (The Association of Religion Data Archives, Center for the Study of Religion and American Culture, the Pluralism Project, etc.), State, Regional and Local Ecumenical Bodies (New York State Council of Churches, etc.), Religious-related Periodicals, and Church Archives and Depositories. The Yearbook does not list individual congregations, nor smaller or local church organizations. An inter-religious calendar provides significant religious observations for several years.

The Yearbook, published by the National Council of Churches USA, is currently compiled by its 16th editor, the Rev. Dr. Eileen W. Lindner, a historian of American religious traditions, Presbyterian minister and former staff member of the National Council of Churches USA. Dr. Lindner writes a yearly analysis of church statistical data charting much-watched trends in growth and decline, and the theme chapter which describes a significant feature of the contemporary religious landscape. Recent theme chapters include, "Megachurches: How do they Count?" (2003), "Equipping Leaders: Theological Education" (2004), "Whither Global Mission?" (2005), "the Emergent Church and Blogging" (2006). The Yearbook's 75th edition, released in March 2007, highlighted the growth of Pentecostal churches on the 100th anniversary of the Azusa Street revival in Los Angeles. The 2008 edition highlighted results from a nationwide survey of congregations' engagement in health-related ministry, titled, "When Did We See Thee Sick? Congregations Respond".
