= Jerry Mitchell (reporter) =

American investigative reporter

Jerry W. Mitchell
- Born: February 23, 1959 (age 67); Springfield, Missouri
- Education: Harding University, Ohio State University
- Occupation: Journalist
- Awards: MacArthur Fellow, George Polk Award

Jerry W. Mitchell (born February 23, 1959) is an American investigative reporter formerly with The Clarion-Ledger, a newspaper in Jackson, Mississippi. He convinced authorities to reopen many cold murder cases from the civil rights era, his investigations providing the basis for prosecutions, prompting one colleague to call him "the South's Simon Wiesenthal". In 2009, he received a "genius grant" from the MacArthur Foundation.

== Life ==
Mitchell began working for The Clarion-Ledger in 1986. In 1989, Mitchell was working as a court reporter when the film Mississippi Burning inspired him to look into old civil rights cases that many thought had long since turned cold. His investigations have led to the arrest of several Klansmen and prompted authorities to reexamine numerous killings during the civil rights era.

In 1996, he was portrayed by Jerry Levine in the Rob Reiner film, Ghosts of Mississippi, about the murder of Medgar Evers and the belated effort to bring killer Byron De La Beckwith to justice. He was featured in The Learning Channel documentary Civil Rights Martyrs that aired in February 2000 and was a consultant for the Discovery Channel documentary Killed by the Klan which aired in 1999.

Mitchell received his undergraduate degree in communications from Harding University and his master's in journalism from Ohio State University in 1997, where he attended the Kiplinger Reporting Program. He lives in Jackson, Mississippi.

== Investigations ==
Mitchell's reporting has helped to put at least four Klansmen behind bars: Byron De La Beckwith for the 1963 assassination of NAACP leader Medgar Evers, Imperial Wizard Sam Bowers for ordering the fatal firebombing of NAACP leader Vernon Dahmer in 1966, Bobby Cherry for the 1963 bombing of a Birmingham church that killed four girls and in 2005, Edgar Ray Killen, for helping orchestrate the June 21, 1964, killings of Michael Schwerner, James Chaney and Andrew Goodman.

Mitchell's work inspired others. Since 1989, authorities in Mississippi and six other states have reexamined 29 killings from the civil rights era and made 27 arrests, leading to 22 convictions. Since 2002, he has collaborated with award-winning schoolteacher Barry Bradford, from Adlai E. Stevenson High School in Lincolnshire, Illinois, on several of his projects. He has often written about the work of Bradford and his students, who helped Mitchell in the Mississippi Burning Case and, more recently, in clearing the name of Clyde Kennard.

One of Mitchell's most historic discoveries was the long-secret identity of Mr. X, the secret informant who helped the FBI discover the location of the bodies of Chaney, Schwerner, and Goodman. Mitchell had narrowed the list of possible candidates through exhaustive investigation. When Barry Bradford provided key information gleaned from his interview with retired FBI agent Don Cesare, Mitchell was able to conclude that Highway Patrolman Maynard King was "Mr. X."

Mitchell has been profiled by Nightline, USA Today, the New York Times, American Journalism Review and others. He has regularly appeared as an expert on CNN, the Lehrer News Hour and other programs.

In 2018, Mitchell retired from the Clarion Ledger and founded the Mississippi Center for Investigative Reporting.

In February 2023, Mitchell and MCIR joined the staff of Mississippi Today.

Mitchell and reporter Ilyssa Daly investigated 20 reported incidents of alleged torture of suspects by Rankin County, Mississippi sheriffs' deputies occurring over two decades, confirming 17 of them. The deputies called themselves the "Goon Squad," and typically searched for methamphetamine. Arrestees were frequently assaulted including via the incorporation of the use of sex toys as weapons. One suspect was shot in the face.

== Awards ==
For his investigative work, Mitchell has won more than 20 national awards, including a MacArthur Foundation genius grant and the Sigma Delta Chi Award for Public Service. Mitchell has also received the Heywood Broun Award, the Sidney Hillman Award, the American Legion's Fourth Estate Award, the National Association of Black Journalists' Award for Enterprise Reporting, the Inland Press Association Award and the Abraham Lincoln Marovitz Award. The Southeastern chapter of the American Board of Trial Advocates decided in April 2006 to give Mitchell its first-ever award for Journalist of the Year.

In October 1998, Mitchell was recognized along with three other journalists at the Kennedy Center in Washington. In 1999, Gannett honored him with the Outstanding Achievement by an Individual Award, the Best Investigative Reporting Award, the Best In-Depth Reporting Award and the William Ringle Outstanding Achievement Career Award, making him the youngest recipient ever of the award. Two years later, he received the Best Beat Reporting Award from Gannett for his continued work, and in 2002, Gannett honored Mitchell as one of its top 10 journalists in the company over the past quarter century.

In 2000, Mitchell received the Silver Em Award from the University of Mississippi, where he was called "a true hero of contemporary American journalism." In 2002, editors Judith and William Serrin featured his work in their anthology of the nation's best journalism over the past three centuries, Muckraking! The Journalism That Changed America.

In November 2005, Mitchell became the youngest recipient ever of Columbia University's John Chancellor Award for Excellence in Journalism for his 17 years of pursuing justice.

In 2006, Mitchell was named a Pulitzer Prize finalist. In the same year, he was the winner of the George Polk Award for Justice Reporting, the Vernon Jarrett Award for Investigative Reporting from the North Carolina Agricultural and Technical State University, the Tom Renner Award for Crime Reporting from Investigative Reporters and Editors and the Outstanding Achievement by an Individual Award (for the second time), and the Toni House Journalism Award from the American Judicature Society.

In 2009, Mitchell received the inaugural McGill Medal for Journalistic Courage from the Grady College of Journalism and Mass Communication.

Mitchell was awarded an honorary doctorate degree from Colby College along with the Elijah Parish Lovejoy Journalism Award, given by Colby College to a journalist who exemplified the fearlessness Lovejoy displayed in excoriating slavery in editorials in Missouri and Illinois, only to become the nation's first martyr to freedom of the press in 1837. In 2020 he was awarded an honorary doctorate degree from his undergraduate alma mater, Harding University.

In 2024, Mitchell received the I.F. Stone medal for Journalistic Independence for body of work, conferred by the Nieman Foundation at Harvard University.

== Narratives ==
Mitchell wrote a 10-chapter narrative, Genetic Disaster, describing his family's often losing battle against a rare genetic ailment and his journey to find out if he had the deadly disease. He received the Associated Press' Outstanding Writing Award for his 13-chapter narrative, The Preacher and the Klansman, which also received a Columbia Journalism School Citation for Coverage of Race & Ethnicity. Thousands have been touched by this story of how a preacher turned civil rights activist became friends with a former Ku Klux Klan terrorist, a true story of reconciliation. One reader wrote: "What a wonderful series, not only because of the heroic reporting and beautiful writing, but because it is at its core, the embodiment of hope."

In February 2020, Simon and Schuster released Mitchell's memoir Race Against Time. The title referred to the decades-delayed, yet thanks to Mitchell's revelatory investigations, many ultimately successful prosecutions of elderly murderers of civil rights martyrs that had been carried out by the likes of Deavours Nix, Byron Beckwith, Robert Chambliss, Thomas Edwin Blanton Jr., and Bobby Frank Cherry.

== Speaker ==
In 2003, Mitchell was a featured speaker at the Ford Foundation conference in New York City on "Journalism and Justice." In October 2005, he spoke at the dedication of the National Civil Rights Memorial Center in Montgomery, Alabama - an event attended by thousands. He regularly speaks at universities across the United States, from Santa Monica Community College to Syracuse University. In June 2005, he spoke to 2,000 graduates of Queens College and 8,000 others, commemorating the efforts made in the interest of racial justice of assassinated former student Andrew Goodman, In 2021, Mitchell attended the Mississippi Scholastic Press Association at the University of Southern Mississippi as a keynote speaker for the Pamela D. Hamilton Keynote Address. Mitchell spoke on the topic of the power of the press. In 2023, he and Myrlie Evers, the widow of Medgar Evers spoke at Pepperdine University on the legacy of the civil rights movement.

== See also ==
- Rankin County torture incident
