= John Cross =

John Cross may refer to:

== Politicians ==
- John Kynaston Cross (1832–1887), British politician
- John Cross (fl. 1402), MP for Guildford
- John Michael Cross (1859–1934), journalist and member of the Queensland Legislative Assembly

== Others ==
- John Cross (artist) (1819–1861), English painter
- John Cross (1840–1924), husband of George Eliot
- John Cross (footballer) (1881–1954), Scottish footballer
- John Keir Cross (1914–1967), Scottish writer
- John Cross Jr. (1925–2007), American pastor
- John H. Cross (1925–2010), American parasitologist
- Jack Cross (footballer, born 1927) (John Cross, 1927-2006), English footballer, see List of AFC Bournemouth players
- John Cross (rugby league) (born 1972), Australian rugby league footballer

== See also ==
- John Crosse (disambiguation)
- John of the Cross (1542–1591), Spanish mystic, Catholic saint, Carmelite friar and priest
- John Joseph of the Cross (1654–1739), Italian saint
