= Sins of the Father (2002 film) =

- DVD cover
- Genre: Crime drama
- Based on: "The Sins of the Father" by Pamela Colloff
- Written by: John Pielmeier
- Directed by: Robert Dornhelm
- Starring: Tom Sizemore; Richard Jenkins; Ving Rhames; Colm Feore
- Music by: Harald Kloser; Thomas Wanker
- Country of origin: United States
- Original language: English

Production
- Executive producers: Robert Cooper; Tracey Alexander
- Producer: Frank Siracusa
- Cinematography: Derick V. Underschultz
- Editor: Victor Du Bois
- Running time: 93 minutes
- Production companies: Artisan Pictures; Landscape Entertainment; Fox Television Studios

Original release
- Network: FX
- Release: January 6, 2002

Sins of the Father is a 2002 American crime drama television film directed by Robert Dornhelm and written by John Pielmeier. It is based on an article by Pamela Colloff published in the April 2000 issue of Texas Monthly, chronicling the 1963 16th Street Baptist Church bombing in Birmingham, Alabama, in which four young African-American girls were killed while attending Sunday school. The victims were Addie Mae Collins, 14 yrs old; Denise McNair, 11 yrs old; Carole Robertson, 14 yrs old; and Cynthia Welsley, 14 yrs old. It was believed that there were 5 girls together in the church basement on that fateful day, but only one survived: young Sarah Collins, Addie Mae's younger sister. The bombing was racially motivated and carried out by members of the Ku Klux Klan. The film was first aired on January 6, 2002 on FX.

== Plot ==
Tom Cherry, a middle-aged man, has difficult decisions to make when the police reopen the investigation into the 1963 16th Street Baptist Church bombing in Birmingham, Alabama in which his father, Bobby Frank Cherry, was involved. Now, Tom has to decide whether to protect his father or to turn him in and let justice finally be done.

== Cast ==
- Tom Sizemore as Tom Cherry
- Richard Jenkins as Bobby Frank Cherry
- Brenda Bazinet as Virginia Cherry
- Lachlan Murdoch as Young Tom
- Colm Feore as Dalton Strong
- Ving Rhames as Garrick Jones
- Jessica Gray Charles as Denise McNair
- Funmiola Lawson as Cynthia Wesley
- Aaryn Doyle as Carole Robertson
- Isys McKoy as Addie Mae Collins
- Mica Le John as Sarah Collins
- Kim Roberts as Mrs. Wesley
- Delores Etienne as Older Woman at Church
- Sandi Ross as Sunday School Teacher
- Ardon Bess as Minister at Church
- Michael Rhoades as Tommy
- Bruce McFee as Robert Chambliss
- Tony Munch as Herman Cash
- Simon Reynolds as Troy Ingram
- Tom McBeath as J. Edgar Hoover

== Production ==
The film was shot in Toronto. The cast includes Tom Sizemore, Richard Jenkins, Ving Rhames, Colm Feore, Jackie Richardson, Connor Price, Aaryn Doyle, Isys McKoy, Jessica Gray Charles, and Funmiola Lawson.

== Reception ==
=== Critical response ===
On Rotten Tomatoes, the film has an approval rating of 50% based on reviews from 6 critics.

Andy Webb from "The Movie Scene" gave the film four out five stars and wrote: "What this all boils down to is that "Sins of the Father" is an extremely powerful movie which doesn't hold back when it comes to showing the racism of the 1960s and then building a modern drama around it with a son's conflict. It will be too brutal for some but it is worth it as it will shock and move you whilst also showing a trio of actors playing difficult roles extremely well."

=== Accolades ===
Rhames was nominated for the Black Reel Award for Best Actor and the NAACP Image Award for Outstanding Actor in a Television Movie, Mini-Series or Dramatic Special. Pielmeier's teleplay earned him nominations for the Humanitas Prize and the Writers Guild of America Award. Sins of the Father was also nominated for an Artios Awards in the category of "Best Casting for TV Movie of the Week". The film was also nominated for an NAACP Image Awards for "Outstanding Actress in a Television Movie, Mini-Series or Dramatic Special".

== See also ==
- Civil rights movement in popular culture
