= Thomas Blanton =

Thomas Blanton may refer to:

- Thomas L. Blanton (1872–1957), United States congressman
- Thomas Edwin Blanton Jr. (1930–2020), co-conspirator in the 16th Street Baptist Church bombing
- Thomas H. Blanton (1895–1965), member of the Virginia Senate
