= United Klans of America =

Ku Klux Klan organization

The United Klans of America Inc. (UKA), based in Alabama, is a Ku Klux Klan organization active in the United States. Led by Robert Shelton, the UKA peaked in membership in the late 1960s and 1970s, and it was the most violent Klan organization of its time. Its headquarters were the Anglo-Saxon Club outside Tuscaloosa, Alabama.

The organization was linked to the 16th Street Baptist Church bombing in Birmingham, Alabama, that killed four young girls; the murder of Viola Liuzzo near Selma in 1965, and the lynching of teenager Michael Donald in Mobile in 1981. Because of murder charges and convictions, some of the UKA's most well-known members included Thomas E. Blanton Jr., Bobby Frank Cherry, Herman Cash, Robert Chambliss, Bennie Hays, Henry Hays, and James Knowles. Robert Shelton died at the age of 73 in 2003 in Tuscaloosa from a heart attack.

In 1987 the UKA was sued for civil damages stemming from the murder of Michael Donald; the damages awarded by the jury bankrupted the organization. Many former members of the group now purportedly belong to other Ku Klux Klan organizations such as The True Ku Klux Klan.

== History ==
During the Civil Rights Movement in the Southern United States, members of the United States Klan and the KKK joined forces in 1960 in order to resist and suppress change. In July 1961, Robert Shelton, the son of a member of the KKK, settled in Alabama after his discharge from the Air Force. He rose to become the dominant figure or the Imperial Wizard, of the UKA after his "Alabama Knights" group merged with the "Invisible Empire, United Klans, Knights of the Ku Klux Klan of America, Inc.", Georgia Knights, and Carolina Units, forming the United Klans of America (UKA).

The increase in activism in the 1960s resulted in the UKA reaching a peak of active members and sympathetic support, with numbers estimated at 26,000 to 33,000 throughout the South in 1965. It was the largest KKK faction in the world, in a highly decentralized organization. The organization was most popular in North Carolina, where by 1966 over half of all UKA members resided. The UKA disseminated its messages through a newsletter known as The Fiery Cross, which was printed in Swartz, Louisiana. However, membership began to slip once the group was linked to criminal activity, and after Shelton served a one-year term in prison for contempt of the United States Congress in 1969. In the early 1970s, UKA membership dropped from tens of thousands to somewhere between 3500 and 4000. Some members continued to enact violence. By the 1980s, membership dropped to around 900.

In the 1990s the UKA experienced a resurgence of activity of members who returned to teachings of William Joseph Simmons, who had founded and led the second Ku Klux Klan from 1915 to 1922. Simmons taught a kind of fraternal organization that is practiced by the UKA in the 21st century. It has several Klaverns active in twenty nine states, according to the Southern Poverty Law Center. The UKA's membership is not precisely known. Its leadership is believed to be weak and its activities are limited to ceremonial practices with no clear political agenda.

== 16th Street bombing ==
The 16th Street Baptist Church in Birmingham, Alabama had a strong congregation and was a center of activism for many people involved in the Civil Rights Movement in the city, including members of the SCLC who came to help with organizing. Many marchers departed from the church in 1963 protests against the city's segregation of businesses and public places. On a Sunday in September 1963, a bomb exploded in the church during services, killing four young girls: 11-year-old Denise McNair, 14-year-old Carole Robertson, 14-year-old Cynthia Wesley, and 14-year-old Addie Mae Collins. More than 20 other parishioners were injured. Addie Mae Collin's sister lost an eye from injuries of the bombing.

Witnesses said they saw a white man put a box underneath the Church steps after getting out of his Chevrolet car. The police arrested Robert Chambliss, a member of the UKA, after he was identified by a witness, and charged him with murder, in addition to "…possessing a box of 122 sticks of dynamite without a permit." The trial took place in October, but Chambliss was not convicted of murder. He did receive a fine of one hundred dollars and six months in jail for possession of the dynamite. He was tried again when Bill Baxley, the state attorney general of Alabama, realized that much of the evidence that the Federal Bureau of Investigation (FBI) had against Chambliss was not used in his original trial. The state tried Chambliss, who in 1977 was convicted of the murder of the four girls, and he was sentenced to life in prison at 73 years old, where he eventually died. Chambliss never confessed to the bombing.

On May 16, 2000, the remaining suspects were indicted. The jury convicted UKA members Robert Chambliss, Thomas E. Blanton Jr., and Bobby Frank Cherry of planting the 19 sticks of dynamite that were used in the 1963 bombing of the 16th Street Baptist Church. In 2001, Thomas E. Blanton Jr., was sentenced to life in prison following his trial, in which he was charged with murder. In 2002, Bobby Frank Cherry also was tried for murder and he, too, received life in prison.

== Murder of Viola Liuzzo ==
In 1965, 39-year-old Viola Liuzzo, a white woman from the North, decided to help support the movement for voting rights in Selma, Alabama. She assisted the Southern Christian Leadership Conference in a variety of ways. During the third march, in which thousands of people came to Selma to participate, she helped drive marchers to catch up with the walkers along the route, as it took a few days. Finally she drove marchers back to Selma after the completion of the march to the capital, Montgomery. On March 25, 1965, as she was making her last trip to Montgomery with 19-year-old Leroy Moton to pick up the marchers, four members of the UKA saw Liuzzo sitting at a red light with Moton, a young black man. They followed the pair in their car, eventually driving up beside her, and shot at the car. Moton survived the shots, pretending to be dead, but Liuzzo died of her wounds. Collie Wilkins, William Orville Eaton, Eugene Thomas, and Gary Thomas Rowe were taken into custody the next day. Wilkins, Eaton, and Thomas each were convicted under the new Civil Rights Act of 1964, receiving 10-year prison sentences. Rowe was revealed as an informant for the FBI.

== Lynching of Michael Donald ==
A mistrial in the case of a black man who was accused of shooting a white police officer in Alabama in 1981 was the erstwhile "reason" which three murderers gave for the lynching of Michael Donald, a 19-year-old black man, on March 21, after Josephus Anderson, a black man in Mobile, Alabama, was charged with the murder of a white police officer but received a hung jury.

UKA member Bennie Hays blamed the jury, claiming that the acquittal was due to the presence of African-American members. Hays said he would kill a black man in retaliation. On March 21, his son Henry Hays, and another younger member of the UKA, James Knowles, decided to take action and drove around to find a victim. They found Michael Donald walking along the street and made him get into their car. After kidnapping him, they drove out to a bordering county, where Hays and Knowles hanged him from a tree.

During the investigation, the police concluded that the murder had to do with drugs, but Donald's mother, Beulah Mae Donald, knew that her son was not involved with drugs, and she decided to take action. She eventually talked to the nationally known civil rights activist Jesse Jackson of Chicago. Thomas Figures, Mobile's U.S. Attorney, contacted the FBI to take on the case under federal civil rights law. Knowles quickly confessed to the lynching. In 1983, James Knowles of the UKA's Klavern 900 in Mobile, was convicted for the 1981 murder of Michael Donald. His conviction resulted in a sentence of life in prison; he was granted mercy because he was 17 years old at the time of the killing. At trial Knowles said that he and Henry Hays killed Donald "in order to show Klan strength in Alabama".

In 1987, Michael Figures and the Southern Poverty Law Center (SPLC) brought a civil case, Donald v. United Klans of America, on behalf of Donald's family against the United Klans of America for being responsible in the lynching of Donald. Unable to come up with the $7 million in damages awarded by the jury, the UKA was forced to turn over its national headquarters to Donald's mother, who sold the property. This lawsuit resulted in the bankruptcy of the UKA. The organization split up in 1987.

During the civil trial, Knowles said that he was "carrying out the orders" of Bennie Jack Hays, Henry Hays's father, and a long time Shelton lieutenant. The trial ended with a guilty verdict, and Knowles, charged with violating Donald's civil rights, received a sentence of life in prison. Henry Hays was charged a few months later with the murder of Donald, he was found guilty, and sentenced to death. Hays was executed on 6 June 1997.

== Other activities ==
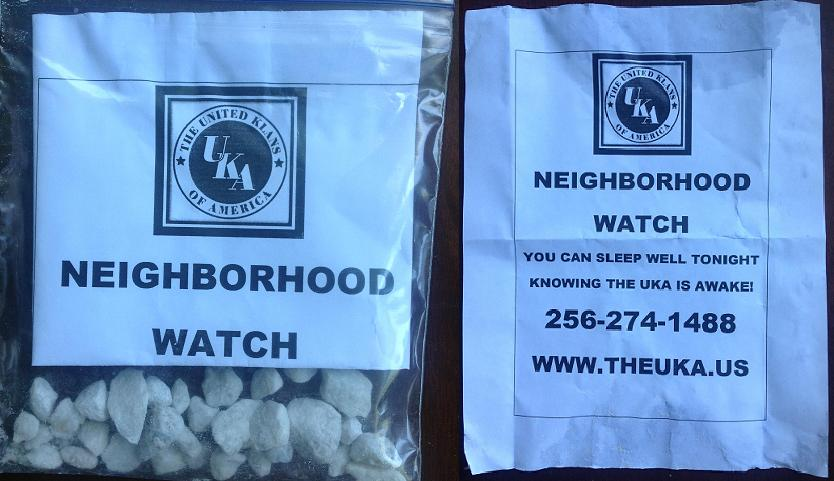
On June 29, 2013, leaflets were left overnight in the driveways of several homes in Burien, Washington, 10 miles south of Seattle. They bore the message, "The United Klans of America (UKA) Neighborhood Watch. You can sleep well tonight knowing the UKA is awake!"

In the spring of 1979, 20 UKA members were indicted in Birmingham, Alabama for violent racial episodes in Talladega County, Alabama. Three members pleaded guilty, while 10 others were found guilty. One of the violent racial episodes included, "...firing into the homes of officers of the NAACP".

In the 1990s the UKA experienced a resurgence in the activity of its members who returned to the teachings of the Imperial Wizard, Col. William Joseph Simmons, who founded and led the second Ku Klux Klan from 1915 to 1939. Under Simmons' leadership, the second Klan operated as a fraternal organization, a style that is still practiced by the UKA in the 21st century. It has several active Klaverns in twenty nine states, according to the Southern Poverty Law Center. The UKA's membership is not precisely known. Its leadership is believed to be weak and its activities are limited to ceremonial practices with no clear political agenda.

In 1998, a complaint was filed against Roy Frankhouser, Grand Dragon of the UKA in Pennsylvania. He had been harassing Bonnie Jouhari, a white woman who worked at the Reading-Berks Human Relations Council in the state of Pennsylvania. Her job was to help people who had been targeted and discriminated against. Frankhouser threatened her and her daughter, Pilar D. Horton. After she unsuccessfully tried to sue Frankhouser, the SPLC decided to represent Jouhari. The case ended with Frankhouser having to complete community service, making a public apology to Jouhari and her daughter, and completing a certain number of hours in sensitivity training.

During the summer of 2013, leaflets purporting to be from the UKA were found in Milford, Connecticut. The leaflets advertised a neighborhood watch, telling residents they can "sleep soundly" knowing the UKA is on patrol. These actions were condemned by town and state leadership. On June 29, 2013 leaflets bearing the same message were also left overnight in the driveways of several homes in Burien, Washington, 10 miles south of Seattle. The incident was reported to the Southern Poverty Law Center and the Burien Police. According to a regional Anti-Defamation League official, the incarnation of the UKA responsible for the flyers was unconnected to the older, defunct organization.

== See also ==
- List of Ku Klux Klan organizations
- White Knights of the Ku Klux Klan, another Ku Klux Klan organization which is similar to the UKA
