= Killing of Johnny Robinson =

1963 police shooting in Birmingham, Alabama

- Part of 16th Street Baptist Church bombing
- Location: Birmingham, Alabama, United States
- Date: September 15, 1963
- Target: Johnny Robinson
- Attack type: Shooting
- Weapon: Shotgun
- Deaths: 1
- Victim: Johnny Robinson
- Perpetrator: Jack Parker (Birmingham Police Officer) 1
- Accused: Jack Parker
- Convictions: None
- Convicted: No

Johnny Robinson (1947 – 1963) was a 16-year-old African-American boy who was shot and killed by a police officer in the unrest following the 16th Street Baptist Church bombing in Birmingham, Alabama. A Birmingham police officer, Jack Parker, who was riding in the back seat of a police car, shot and killed Robinson. Parker was never indicted for the killing.

== Background ==
Johnny Robinson was born in 1947. He had a difficult upbringing in Birmingham, as the city had seen 50 racially driven bombings between 1945 and 1963. He was the oldest of three children and attended the Alberta Shields School. A few years prior to Robinson's death, his father was murdered by a neighbor, leaving his mother alone to raise her children in a city fraught with racial violence.

The officer who shot Robinson was a head of a lodge of a fraternal order of police. He had put his signature to an ad in the newspaper arguing against integration in the police force.

== Events ==
Early on Sunday morning, September 15, 1963, a Ku Klux Klan member placed a bomb with a timing device under the side steps of the 16th Street Baptist Church, which had served as the headquarters for the Birmingham Children's Crusade during April and early May. Two hundred worshipers were expected in the church that day, and after the bomb detonated in the late morning, three 14-year-old girls and an 11-year-old girl were found killed, with twenty-two wounded. The incident prompted civil unrest that was further provoked by the shooting deaths of two black children that day: 16-year-old Johnny Robinson and 13-year-old Virgil Ware. Aside from civil unrest, there is no confirmed connection between these two teenagers and the victims of the bombing.

Ware had been riding on the handlebars of his brother's bicycle when he was shot twice with a revolver by Larry Joe Sims, a white 16-year-old who supported the segregationist movement. Earlier that day, Sims had joined a fellow teenager, Michael Lee Farley, at the headquarters for the National States' Rights Party and set out to cruise the neighborhood together. Sims was later charged with first-degree murder but was convicted of second-degree manslaughter, while Farley pleaded guilty to second-degree manslaughter. Both teens were sentenced to seven months in jail, which was changed to two years probation.

Robinson was about to join his sister for Sunday dinner, but had accompanied his friends to a gas station that was not far from the 16th Street Baptist Church. Several white men drove by, yelling racial slurs, waving Confederate flags, and throwing bottles. Some witnesses later said Robinson was with a group of boys who threw rocks at a car draped with a Confederate flag. A police car then arrived on the scene. Birmingham police officer Jack Parker was in the back seat, pointing a shotgun out the window. Parker later gave two differing accounts of the event, as he both claimed to have fired a warning shot and that the gun went off accidentally.

Parker was white, as were all Birmingham Police officers at that time. He had joined the police force in 1951 and was 48 years old when he shot Robinson. At the time he was also the head of a Fraternal Order of Police.

== Aftermath ==
After a week of funerals related to the bombing, co-founder of the Alabama Christian Movement for Human Rights Nelson Smith remarked that their people would be hard to restrain when they were still under active threat of bombings.

Two grand juries refused to indict Parker, stating that there were no reliable witness accounts. Not long after the shooting, he signed a newspaper advertisement advocating against integrating the police department of Birmingham. He resigned 10 years after the shooting. Parker died of lung cancer on April 9, 1977, decades before the FBI re-opened Robinson's case in 2007 in light of the Department of Justice's Cold Case Initiative.
