= Wales Window for Alabama =

Stained glass window in Alabama

The Wales Window for Alabama is a stained-glass window by the artist John Petts created in response to the 16th Street Baptist Church bombing which took place in 1963. Petts, who was based in Carmarthenshire, initiated a campaign in Wales to raise money to fund a stained-glass window to replace one of the windows destroyed in the bombing. The window was installed in the 16th Street Baptist Church, Birmingham, Alabama, in 1965.

== History of the window ==
The appeal for funds was conducted through the Western Mail. Petts visited Alabama and opted to construct a stained-glass image of a Black Christ. Donations from the Welsh public paid for the construction of the art work in Wales, and its delivery and installation at the 16th Street Baptist Church. According to Theodore Debro, a former chair of 16th Street Baptist Church, the church was initially reluctant to receive the artwork but ultimately agreed to accept it.

John Petts died in 1991 at the age of 77. In a 1987 interview focusing upon his recollections of the bombing, Petts recollected: "Naturally, as a father, I was horrified by the deaths of those children." Petts then elaborated that the inspiration for the stained-glass image was a verse from the Gospel of Matthew: "Truly, I say to you, as you did it to one of the least of these my brothers, you did it to me." The Wales Window of Alabama bears the inscription, "Given by The People of Wales".

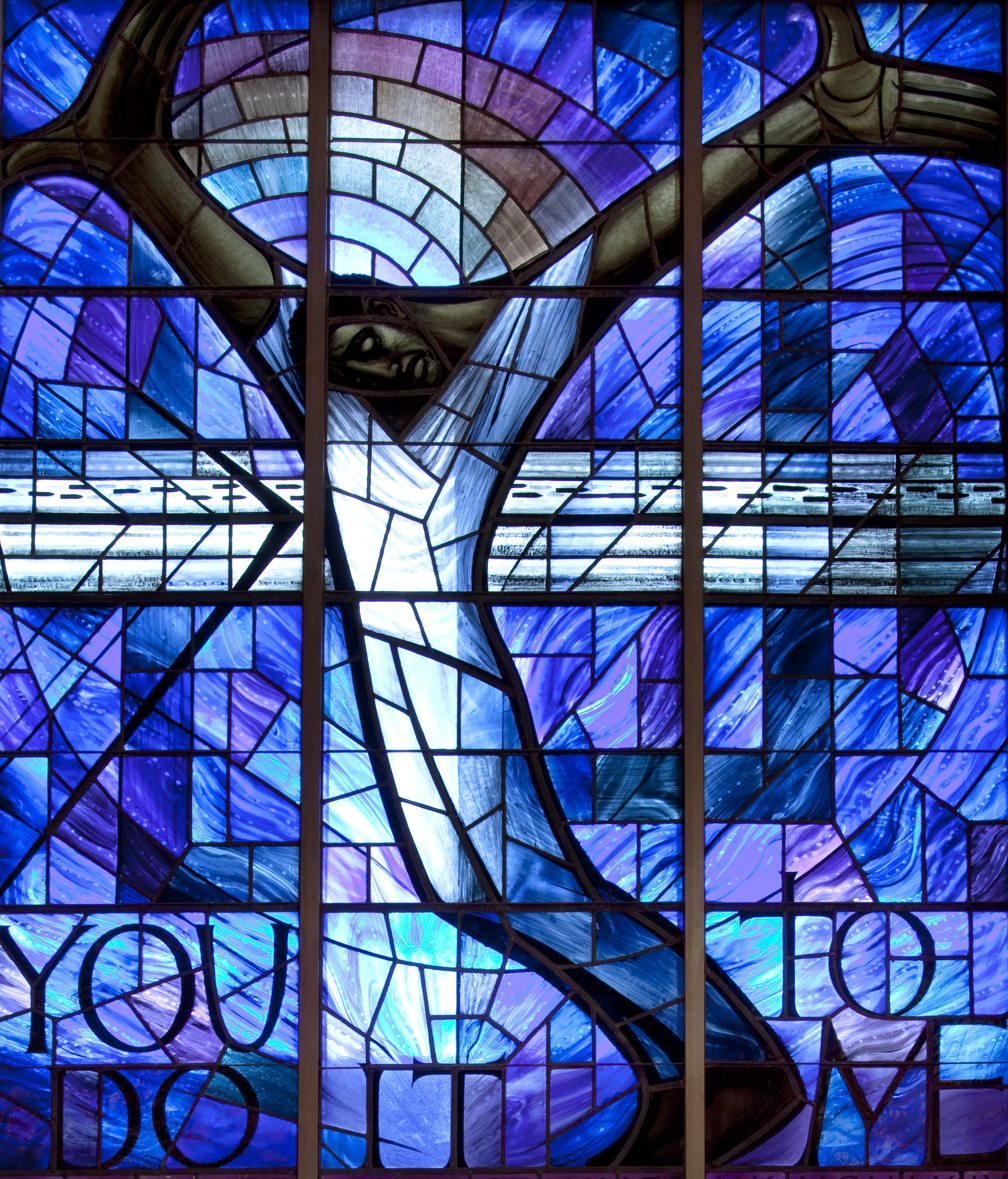

In 2023 Vaughan Gething, the first black minister in the Welsh Government, visited Birmingham for the 60th anniversary of the bombing.

== Conservation of the designs and the window ==
In 1970, the designs for the window were donated to the National Library of Wales in Aberystwyth. In 2013, to mark the 50th anniversary of the bombing, Petts's original designs were displayed at the National Library of Wales. In September 2018, it was reported that the church was concerned that Alabama's stormy weather would destroy the window and appealed to the public to raise funds to preserve it.

== See also ==
- Civil rights movement in popular culture
