= 16th Street Baptist Church bombing =

1963 terrorist attack in Birmingham, Alabama

- Part of the Civil Rights movement and the Birmingham campaign
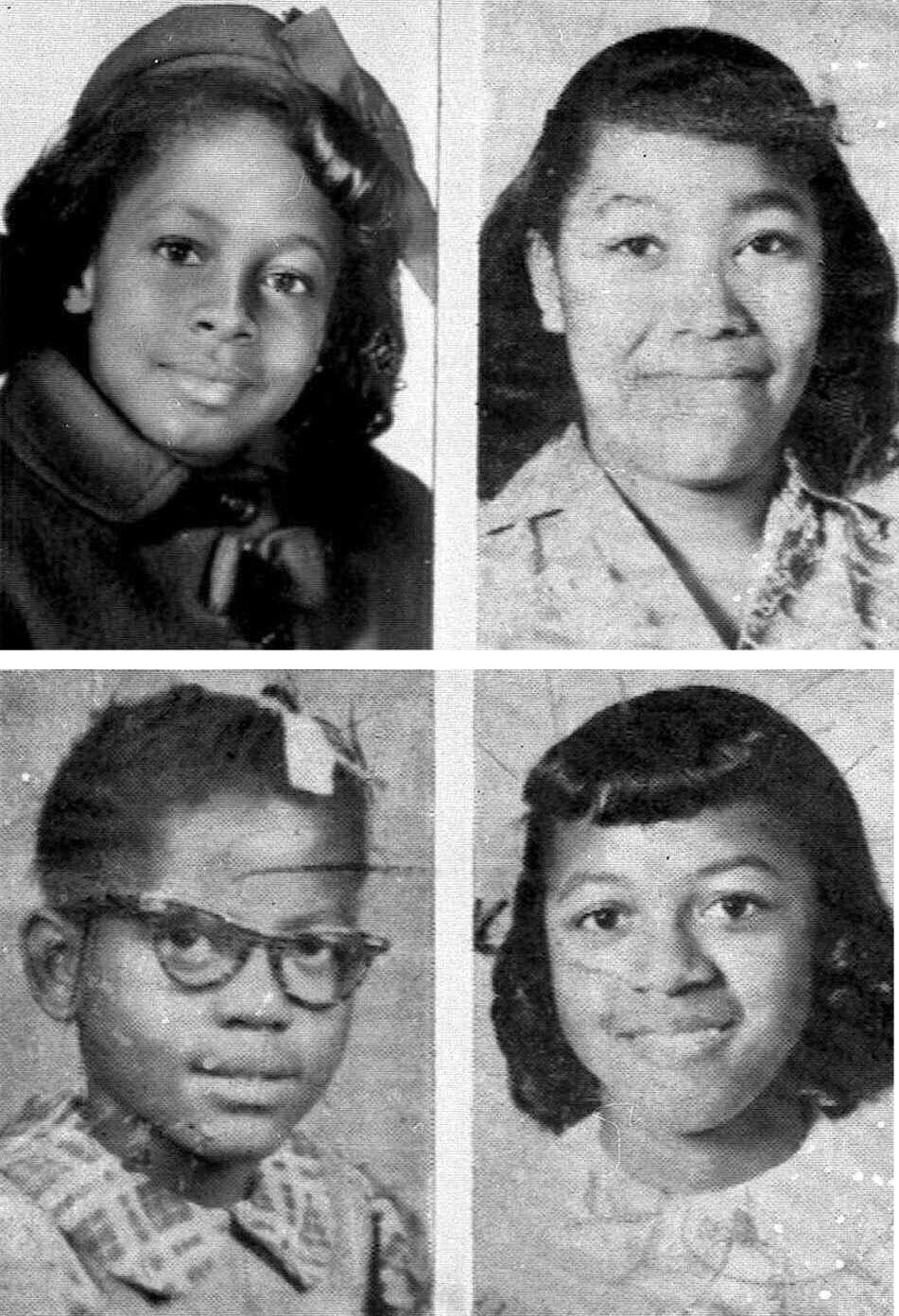
- The four girls murdered in the bombing (clockwise from top left): Carol Denise McNair (11), Carole Robertson (14), Cynthia Wesley (14), and Addie Mae Collins (14)
- Location: 33°31′0″N 86°48′54″W; Birmingham, Alabama, U.S.
- Date: September 15, 1963; 63 years ago 10:22 a.m. (UTC-5)
- Target: 16th Street Baptist Church
- Attack type: Mass murder; domestic terrorism; right-wing terrorism; bombing
- Deaths: 4
- Injuries: 14–22
- Victims: Addie Mae Collins; Cynthia Wesley; Carole Robertson; Carol Denise McNair
- Perpetrators: Thomas Blanton (convicted); Robert Chambliss (convicted); Bobby Cherry (convicted); Herman Cash (alleged)
- Motive: Anti-Black racism and support for racial segregation

The 16th Street Baptist Church bombing was a terrorist bombing of the 16th Street Baptist Church in Birmingham, Alabama, on September 15, 1963. The bombing was committed by the white supremacist terrorist group the Ku Klux Klan (KKK). Four members of a local KKK chapter planted 19 sticks of dynamite attached to a timing device beneath the steps located on the east side of the church.

Described by Martin Luther King Jr. as "one of the most vicious and tragic crimes ever perpetrated against humanity," the explosion at the church killed four girls and injured between 14 and 22 other people.

The 1965 investigation by the Federal Bureau of Investigation determined the bombing had been committed by four known KKK members and segregationists: Thomas Edwin Blanton Jr., Herman Frank Cash, Robert Edward Chambliss, and Bobby Frank Cherry. However, it was not until 1977 that the first suspect, Robert Chambliss, was prosecuted by Attorney General of Alabama William "Bill" Baxley and convicted of the first degree murder of one of the victims, 11-year-old Carol Denise McNair.

As part of an effort by state and federal prosecutors to reopen and try cold cases involving murder and domestic terrorism from the civil rights era, the State of Alabama placed both Blanton and Cherry on trial; they were each convicted of four counts of first degree murder and sentenced to life imprisonment in 2001 and 2002, respectively. Future United States Senator Doug Jones successfully prosecuted Blanton and Cherry. Herman Cash died in 1994, and was never charged with his alleged involvement in the bombing.

The 16th Street Baptist Church bombing marked a turning point in the United States during the civil rights movement and also contributed to support for the passage of the Civil Rights Act of 1964 by Congress.

== Background ==
In the years leading up to the 16th Street Baptist Church bombing, Birmingham had earned a national reputation as a tense, violent and racially segregated city, in which even tentative racial integration in any form was met with violent resistance. Martin Luther King Jr. described Birmingham as "probably the most thoroughly segregated city in the United States." Birmingham's Commissioner of Public Safety, Theophilus Eugene "Bull" Connor, led the effort in enforcing racial segregation in the city through the use of violent tactics.

Black and white residents of Birmingham were segregated between different public amenities, such as water fountains, and places of public gathering such as movie theaters. The city had no black police officers or firefighters and most black residents could expect to find only menial employment in professions such as cooks and cleaners. Black residents did not just experience segregation in the context of leisure and employment, but also in the context of their freedom and well-being. Given the state's disenfranchisement of most black people since the turn of the century, by making voter registration essentially impossible, few of the city's black residents were registered to vote. Bombings at black homes and institutions were a regular occurrence, with at least 21 separate explosions recorded at black properties and churches in the eight years before 1963. However, none of these explosions had resulted in fatalities. These attacks earned the city the nickname "Bombingham".

=== Birmingham campaign ===
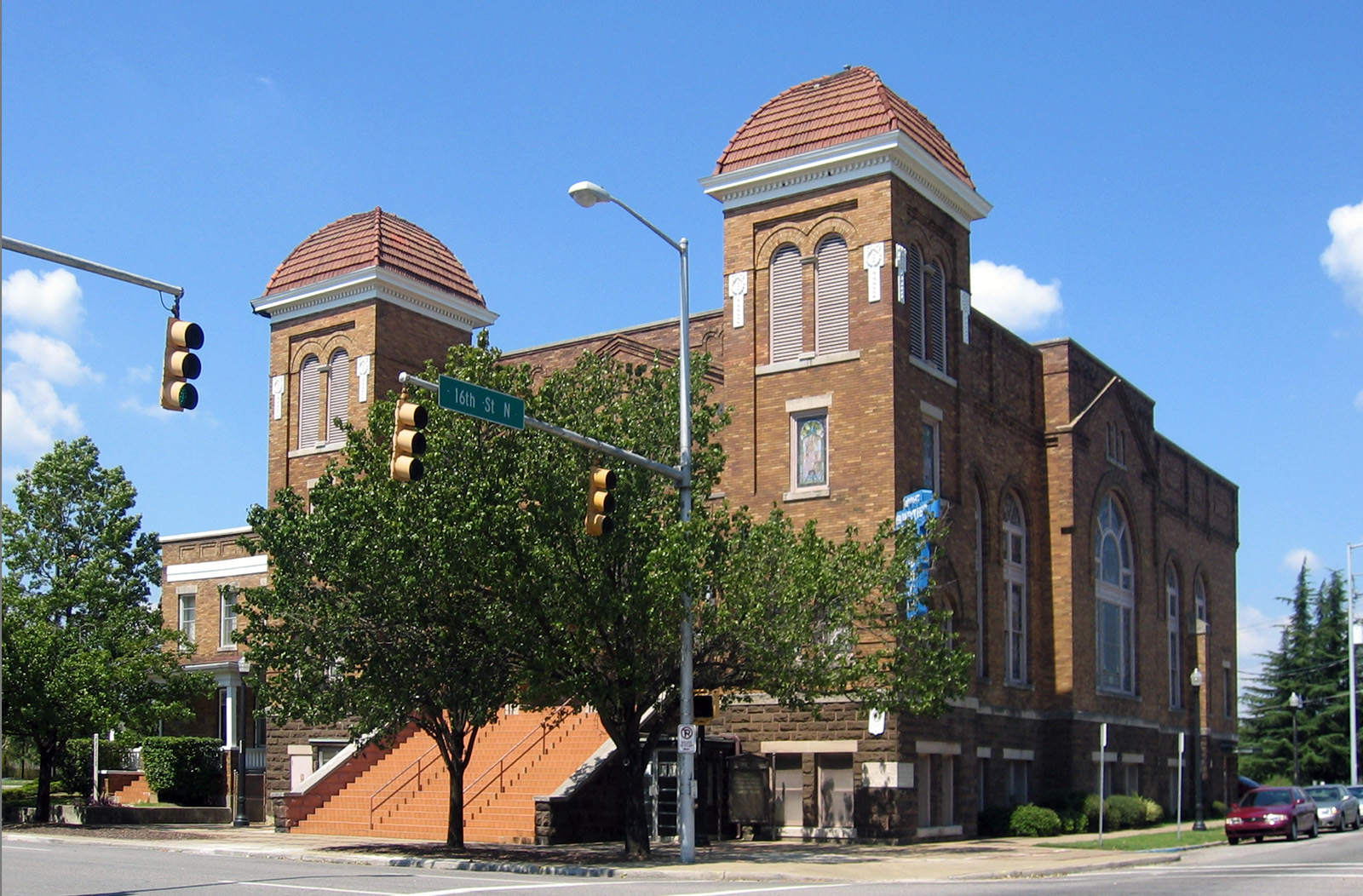
The 16th Street Baptist Church, seen here in 2005

Civil Rights activists and leaders in Birmingham fought against the city's deeply-ingrained and institutionalized racism with tactics that included the targeting of Birmingham's economic and social disparities. Their demands included that public amenities such as lunch counters and parks be desegregated, the criminal charges against demonstrators and protestors should be removed, and an end to overt discrimination with regards to employment opportunities. The intentional scope of these activities was to see the end of segregation across Birmingham and the South as a whole. The work these Civil Rights activists were engaged in within Birmingham was crucial to the movement as the Birmingham campaign was seen as guidance for other cities in the South with regards to rising against segregation and racism.

The three-story 16th Street Baptist Church was a rallying point for civil rights activities through the spring of 1963. When the Southern Christian Leadership Conference (SCLC) and the Congress on Racial Equality became involved in a campaign to register African Americans to vote in Birmingham, tensions in the city increased. The church was used as a meeting-place for civil rights leaders such as Martin Luther King Jr., Ralph Abernathy, and Fred Shuttlesworth, for organizing and educating marchers. It was the location where students were organized and trained by the SCLC Director of Direct Action, James Bevel, to participate in the 1963 Birmingham campaign's Children's Crusade after other marches had taken place.

On Thursday, May 2, more than 1,000 students, some reportedly as young as eight, opted to leave school and gather at the 16th Street Baptist Church. Demonstrators present were given instructions to march to downtown Birmingham and discuss with the mayor their concerns about racial segregation in the city, and to integrate buildings and businesses currently segregated. Although this march was met with fierce resistance and criticism, and 600 arrests were made on the first day alone, the Birmingham campaign and its Children's Crusade continued until May 5. The intention was to fill the jail with protesters. These demonstrations led to an agreement, on May 8, between the city's business leaders and the Southern Christian Leadership Conference, to integrate public facilities, including schools, in the city within 90 days. (The first three schools in Birmingham to be integrated would do so on September 4.)

These demonstrations and the concessions from city leaders to the majority of demonstrators' demands were met with fierce resistance by other whites in Birmingham. In the weeks following the September 4 integration of public schools, three additional bombs were detonated in Birmingham. Other acts of violence followed the settlement, and several staunch Klansmen were known to have expressed frustration at what they saw as a lack of effective resistance to integration.

As a known and popular rallying point for civil rights activists, the 16th Street Baptist Church was an obvious target.

== Bombing ==
In the early morning of Sunday, September 15, 1963, several members of the United Klans of America—Thomas Edwin Blanton Jr., Robert Edward Chambliss, Bobby Frank Cherry, and, allegedly, Herman Frank Cash—planted a minimum of 15 sticks of dynamite with a time delay under the steps of the church, close to the basement. At approximately 10:22 a.m., an anonymous man phoned the 16th Street Baptist Church. The call was answered by the acting Sunday School secretary, a 15-year-old girl named Carolyn Maull. The anonymous caller simply said the words, "Three minutes" to Maull before terminating the call. Less than one minute later, the bomb exploded. Five children were in the basement at the time of the explosion, in a restroom close to the stairwell, changing into choir robes in preparation for a sermon entitled "A Rock That Will Not Roll". According to one survivor, the explosion shook the entire building and propelled the girls' bodies through the air "like rag dolls".

The explosion blew a hole measuring seven feet (2.1 m) in diameter in the church's rear wall, and a crater five feet (1.5 m) wide and two feet (0.61 m) deep in the ladies' basement lounge, destroying the rear steps to the church and blowing a passing motorist out of his car. Several other cars parked near the site of the blast were destroyed, and windows of properties located more than two blocks from the church were also damaged. All but one of the church's stained-glass windows were destroyed in the explosion. The sole stained-glass window largely undamaged in the explosion depicted Christ leading a group of young children.

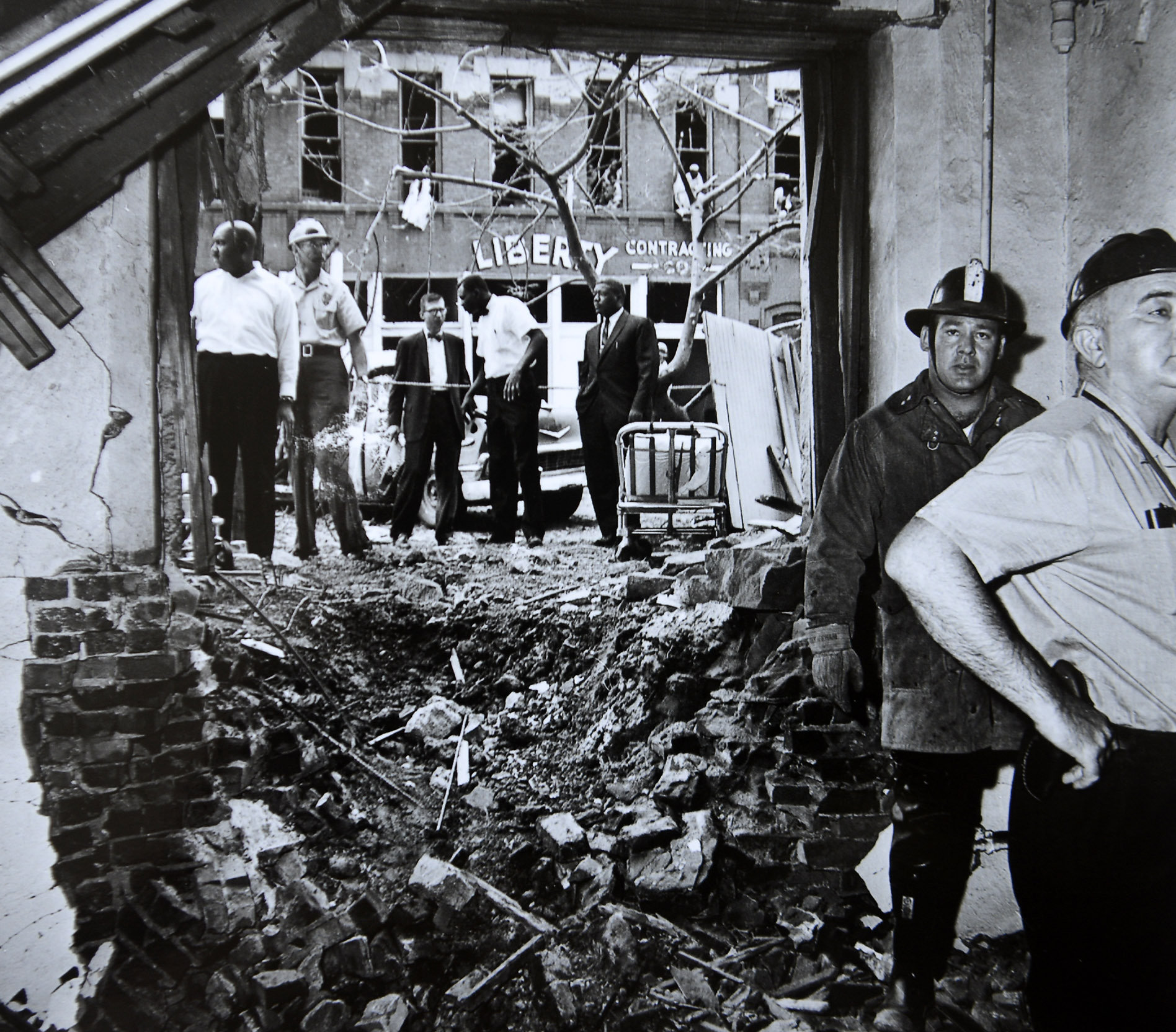
The aftermath of the bombing, taken from inside the church and depicting the hole caused by the explosion.

Hundreds of individuals, some of them lightly wounded, converged on the church to search the debris for survivors as police erected barricades around the church and several outraged men scuffled with police. An estimated 2,000 black people converged on the scene in the hours following the explosion. The church's pastor, the Reverend John Cross Jr., attempted to placate the crowd by loudly reciting the 23rd Psalm through a bullhorn.

=== Casualties ===
Four girls—Addie Mae Collins (age 14, born April 18, 1949), Carol Denise McNair (age 11, born November 17, 1951), Carole Rosamond Robertson (age 14, born April 24, 1949), and Cynthia Dionne Wesley (age 14, born April 30, 1949)—were killed in the attack. The explosion was so intense that one of the girls' bodies was decapitated and so badly mutilated that her body could be identified only through her clothing and a ring. Another victim was killed by a piece of mortar embedded in her skull. The pastor of the church, the Reverend John Cross, recollected in 2001 that the girls' bodies were found "stacked on top of each other, clung together". All four girls were pronounced dead on arrival at the Hillman Emergency Clinic.

Between 14 and 22 additional people were injured in the explosion, one of whom was Addie Mae's younger sister, 12-year-old Sarah Collins. She had 21 pieces of glass embedded in her face and was blinded in one eye. In her later recollections of the bombing, Collins would recall that in the moments immediately before the explosion, she had watched her sister, Addie, tying her dress sash. Another sister of Addie Mae Collins, 16-year-old Junie Collins, would later recall that shortly before the explosion, she had been sitting in the basement of the church reading the Bible and had observed Addie Mae Collins tying the dress sash of Carol Denise McNair before she returned upstairs to the ground floor of the church.

=== Unrest and tensions ===
Violence escalated in Birmingham in the hours following the bombing, with reports of groups of black and white youth throwing bricks and shouting insults at each other. Police urged parents of black and white youths to keep their children indoors, as the Governor of Alabama, George Wallace, ordered an additional 300 state police and 500 Alabama National Guardsmen to assist in quelling unrest. The Birmingham City Council convened an emergency meeting to propose safety measures for the city, although proposals for a curfew were rejected. Within 24 hours of the bombing, a minimum of five businesses and properties had been firebombed and numerous cars—most of which were driven by whites—had been stoned by rioting youths.

In response to the church bombing, described by the Mayor of Birmingham, Albert Boutwell, as "just sickening", the Attorney General, Robert F. Kennedy, dispatched 25 FBI agents, including explosives experts, to Birmingham to conduct a thorough forensic investigation.

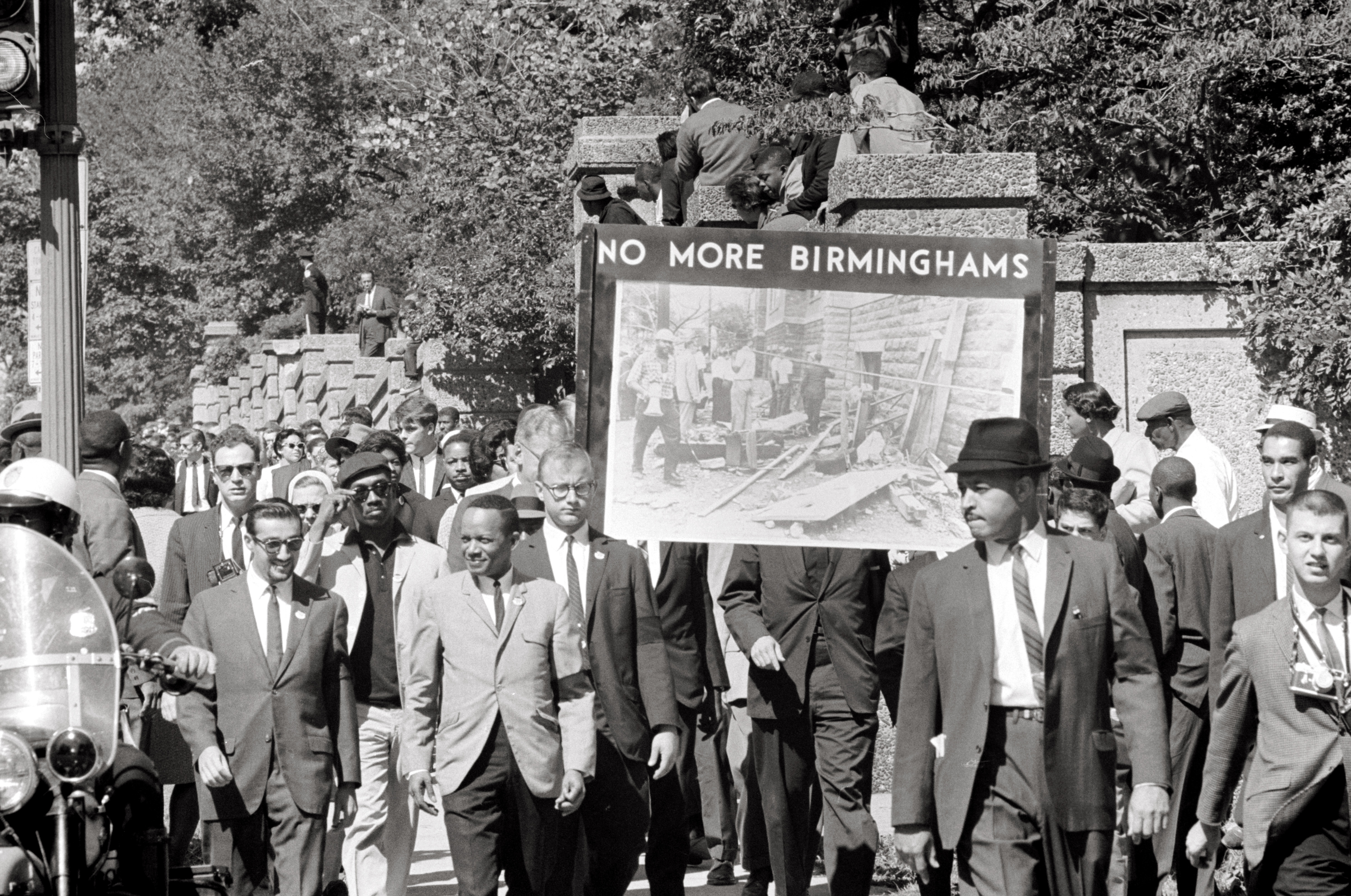
Congress of Racial Equality and members of the All Souls Church march in memory of the 16th Street Baptist Church bombing victims on September 22, 1963.

Although reports of the bombing and the loss of four children's lives were glorified by white supremacists, who in many instances chose to celebrate the loss as "four less niggers", as news of the church bombing and the death of four young girls in the explosion reached the national and international press, many felt that they had not taken the civil rights struggle seriously enough. The day following the bombing, a young white lawyer named Charles Morgan Jr. addressed a meeting of businessmen, condemning the acquiescence of white people in Birmingham toward the oppression of blacks. In this speech, Morgan lamented: "Who did it [the bombing]? We all did it! The 'who' is every little individual who talks about the 'niggers' and spreads the seeds of his hate to his neighbor and his son ... What's it like living in Birmingham? No one ever really has known and no one will until this city becomes part of the United States." A Milwaukee Sentinel editorial opined, "For the rest of the nation, the Birmingham church bombing should serve to goad the conscience. The deaths ... in a sense, are on the hands of each of us."

Two more black youths, Johnny Robinson and Virgil Ware, were shot to death in Birmingham within seven hours of the Sunday morning bombing. Robinson, aged 16, was shot in the back by Birmingham police officer Jack Parker as he fled down an alley, after ignoring police orders to halt. The police were reportedly responding to black youths throwing rocks at cars driven by white people. Robinson died before reaching the hospital. Ware, aged 13, was shot in the cheek and chest with a revolver in a residential suburb 15 miles (24 km) north of the city. A 16-year-old white youth named Larry Sims fired the gun (given to him by another youth named Michael Farley) at Ware, who was sitting on the handlebars of a bicycle ridden by his brother. Sims and Farley had been riding home from an anti-integration rally which had denounced the church bombing. When he spotted Ware and his brother, Sims fired twice, reportedly with his eyes closed. (Sims and Farley were later convicted of second degree manslaughter, although the judge suspended their sentences and imposed two years' probation upon each youth.)

Some civil rights activists blamed George Wallace, Governor of Alabama and an outspoken segregationist, for creating the climate that had led to the killings. One week before the bombing, Wallace granted an interview with The New York Times, in which he said he believed Alabama needed a "few first-class funerals" to stop racial integration.

The city of Birmingham initially offered a $52,000 reward for the arrest of the bombers. Governor Wallace offered an additional $5,000 on behalf of the state of Alabama. Although this donation was accepted, Martin Luther King Jr. is known to have sent Wallace a telegram saying, "the blood of four little children ... is on your hands. Your irresponsible and misguided actions have created in Birmingham and Alabama the atmosphere that has induced continued violence and now murder."

=== Funerals ===
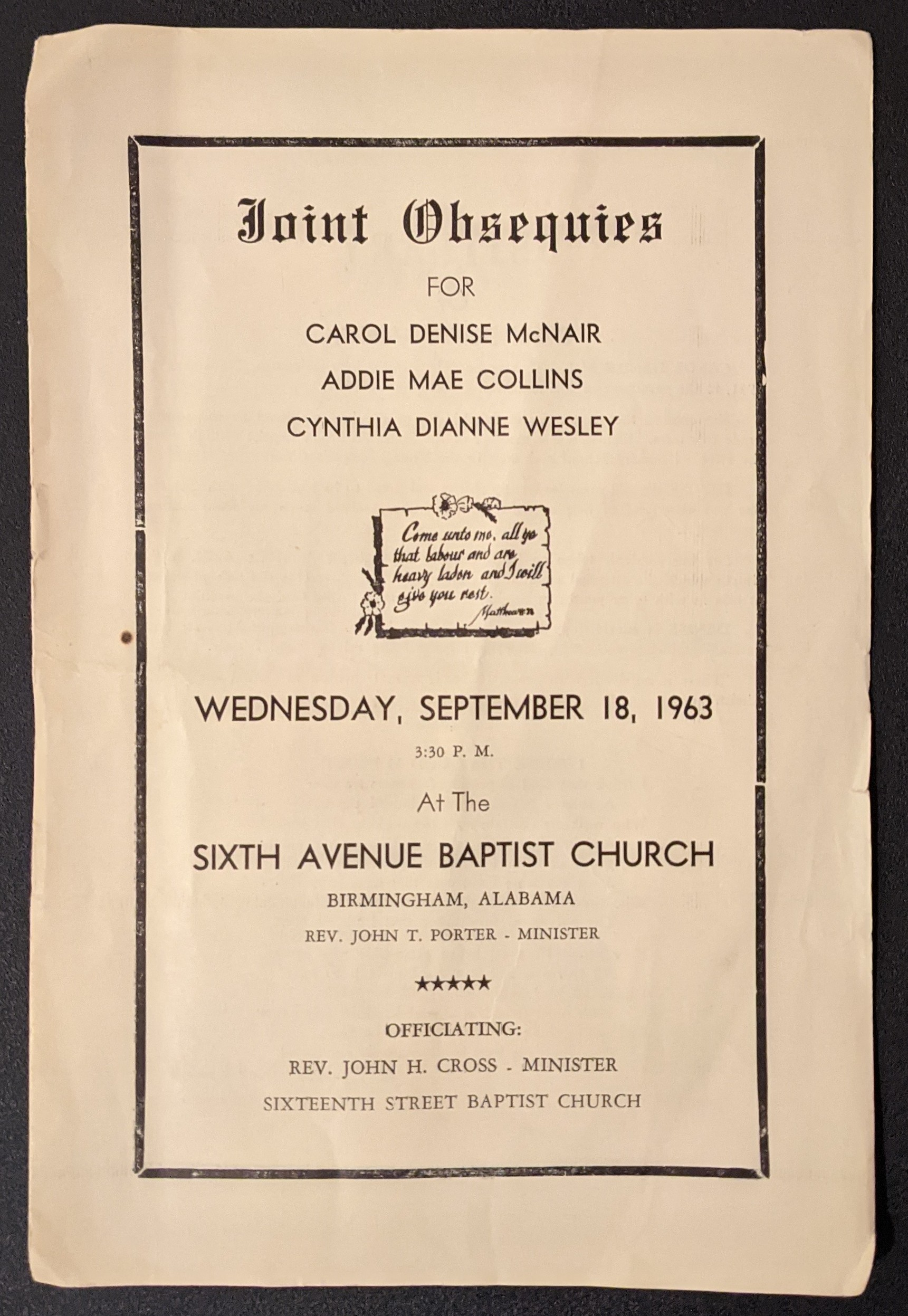
Funeral program for Addie Mae Collins, Cynthia Wesley, and Carol Denise McNair

Carole Rosamond Robertson was laid to rest in a private family funeral held on September 17, 1963. Reportedly, Carole's mother, Alpha, had expressly requested that her daughter be buried separately from the other victims. She was distressed about a remark made by Martin Luther King, who had said that the mindset that enabled the murder of the four girls was the "apathy and complacency" of black people in Alabama.

The service for Carole Rosamond Robertson was held at St. John's African Methodist Episcopal Church. In attendance were 1,600 people. At this service, the Reverend C. E. Thomas told the congregation: "The greatest tribute you can pay to Carole is to be calm, be lovely, be kind, be innocent." Carole Robertson was buried in a blue casket at Shadow Lawn Cemetery.

On September 18, the funeral of the three other girls killed in the bombing was held at the Sixth Avenue Baptist Church. Although no city officials attended this service, an estimated 800 clergymen of all races were among the attendees. Also present was Martin Luther King Jr. In a speech conducted before the burials of the girls, King addressed an estimated 3,300 mourners—including numerous white people—with a speech saying:

This tragic day may cause the white side to come to terms with its conscience. In spite of the darkness of this hour, we must not become bitter ... We must not lose faith in our white brothers. Life is hard. At times as hard as crucible steel, but, today, you do not walk alone.

As the girls' coffins were taken to their graves, King directed that those present remain solemn and forbade any singing, shouting or demonstrations. These instructions were relayed to the crowd present by a single youth with a bullhorn.

=== Public support and donations ===
Following the bombing, the 16th Street Baptist Church remained closed for over eight months, as assessments and, later, repairs were conducted upon the property. Both the church and the bereaved families received an estimated $23,000 ($241,875 in 2025) in cash donations from members of the public. Gifts totaling over $186,000 ($1.96 million in 2025) were donated from around the world. The church reopened to members of the public on June 7, 1964.

=== Activism ===
Charles Morgan Jr., the young white lawyer who had delivered an impassioned speech on September 16, 1963, deploring the tolerance and complacency of much of the white population of Birmingham towards the suppression and intimidation of blacks—thereby contributing to the climate of hatred in the city—himself received death threats directed against him and his family in the days following his speech. Within three months, Morgan and his family were forced to flee Birmingham.

James Bevel, a prominent figure within the Civil Rights Movement and organizer of the Southern Christian Leadership Conference, was galvanized to create what became known as the Alabama Project for Voting Rights as a direct result of the 16th Street Baptist Church Bombing. Following the bombing, Bevel and his then-wife, Diane, relocated to Alabama, where they tirelessly worked upon the Alabama Project for Voting Rights, which aimed to extend full voting rights for all eligible citizens of Alabama regardless of race. This initiative subsequently contributed to the 1965 Selma to Montgomery marches, which themselves resulted in the Voting Rights Act of 1965, thus prohibiting any form of racial discrimination within the process of voting.

=== Commentary ===
They forever changed the face of this state and the history of this state. Their deaths made all of us focus upon the ugliness of those who would punish people because of the color of their skin.
—State Senator Roger Bedford at the unveiling of a state historic marker to the victims. September 15, 1990

Condoleezza Rice, 66th US Secretary of State, was eight years old at the time of the bombing and was classmate and friend to Carol Denise McNair. Rice was at her father's church, located a few blocks from the 16th Street Baptist Church on the day of the bombing. In 2004, Rice recalled her memories of the bombing:

I remembered the bombing of that Sunday School at 16th Street Baptist Church in Birmingham in 1963. I did not see it happen, but I heard it happen and I felt it happen, just a few blocks away at my father's church. It is a sound that I will never forget, that will forever reverberate in my ears. That bomb took the lives of four young girls, including my friend and playmate [Carol] Denise McNair. The crime was calculated, not random. It was meant to suck the hope out of young lives, bury their aspirations, and ensure that old fears would be propelled forward into the next generation.

=== Resulting legislation ===
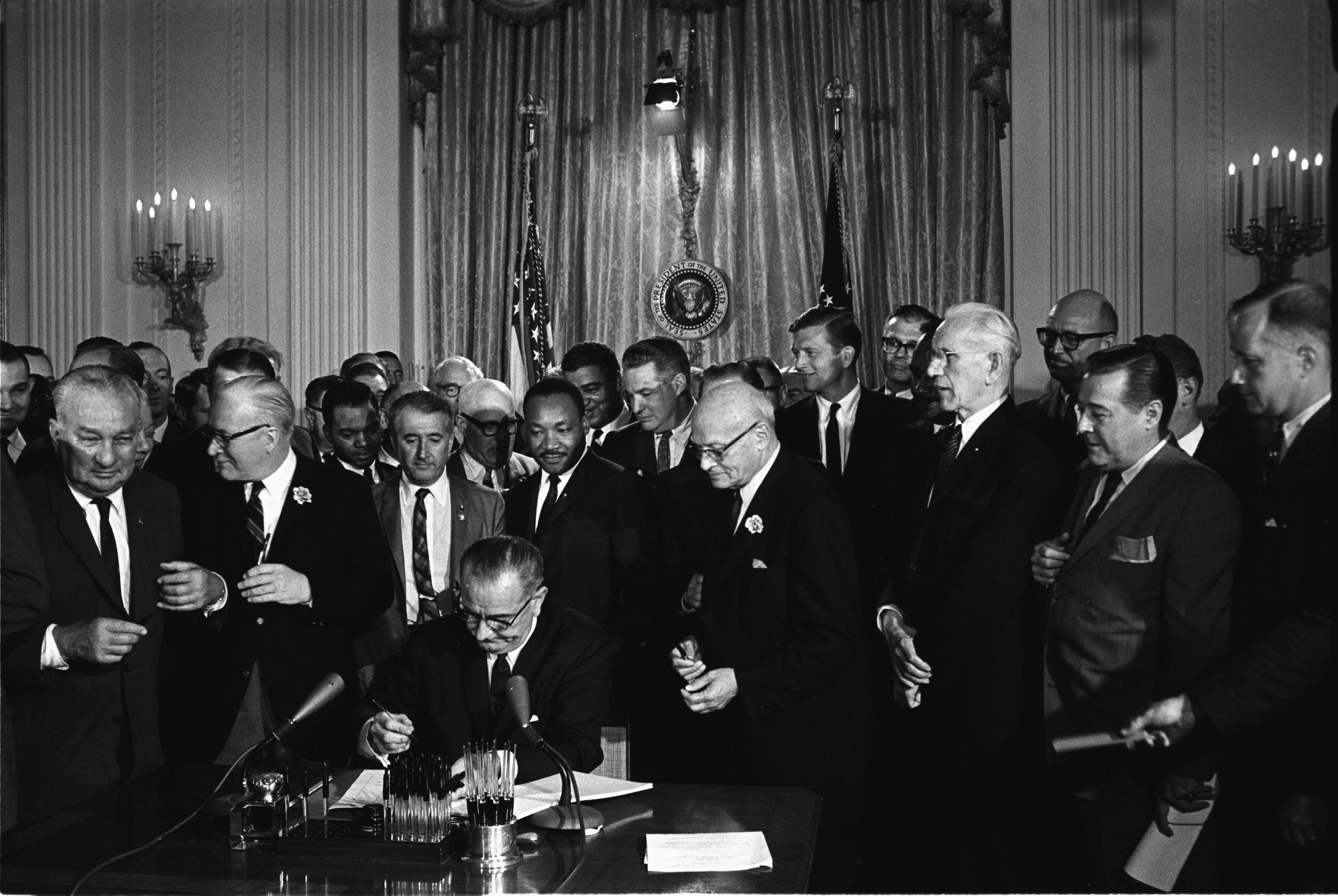
President Lyndon Johnson signs into effect the Civil Rights Act of 1964. July 2, 1964.

The Birmingham campaign, the March on Washington in August, the September bombing of the 16th Street Baptist church, and the November assassination of John F. Kennedy—an ardent supporter of the civil rights cause who had proposed a Civil Rights Act of 1963 on national television—increased worldwide awareness of and sympathy toward the civil rights cause in the United States.

Following the assassination of John F. Kennedy on November 22, 1963, newly-inaugurated President Lyndon Johnson continued to press for passage of the civil rights bill sought by his predecessor.

On July 2, 1964, President Lyndon Johnson signed into effect the Civil Rights Act of 1964. In attendance were major leaders of the Civil Rights Movement, including Martin Luther King Jr. This legislation prohibited discrimination based on race, color, religion, gender, or national origin; to ensure full, equal rights of African Americans before the law.

== Investigations and prosecutions ==
=== Initial investigation ===
Initially, investigators theorized that a bomb thrown from a passing car had caused the explosion at the 16th Street Baptist church. But by September 20, the FBI was able to confirm that the explosion had been caused by a device that was purposely planted beneath the steps to the church, close to the women's lounge. A section of wire and remnants of red plastic were discovered there, which could have been part of a timing device. (The plastic remnants were later lost by investigators.)

Within days of the bombing, investigators began to focus their attention upon a KKK splinter group known as the "Cahaba Boys". The Cahaba Boys had formed earlier in 1963, as they felt that the KKK was becoming restrained and impotent in response to concessions granted to black people to end racial segregation. This group had previously been linked to several bomb attacks at black-owned businesses and the homes of black community leaders throughout the spring and summer of 1963. Although the Cahaba Boys had fewer than 30 active members, among them were Thomas Blanton Jr., Herman Cash, Robert Chambliss, and Bobby Cherry.

Investigators also gathered numerous witness statements attesting to a group of white men in a turquoise 1957 Chevrolet who had been seen near the church in the early hours of the morning of September 15. These witness statements specifically indicated that a white man had exited the car and walked toward the steps of the church. (The physical description by witnesses of this person varied, and could have matched either Bobby Cherry or Robert Chambliss.)

Chambliss was questioned by the FBI on September 26. On September 29, he was indicted upon charges of illegally purchasing and transporting dynamite on September 4, 1963. He and two acquaintances, John Hall and Charles Cagle, were each convicted in state court upon a charge of illegally possessing and transporting dynamite on October 8. Each received a $100 fine (equivalent to $1,050 in 2025) and a suspended 180-day jail sentence. At the time, no federal charges were filed against Chambliss or any of his fellow conspirators in relation to the bombing.

==== FBI closure of case ====
The FBI encountered difficulties in their initial investigation into the bombing. A later report stated: "By 1965, we had [four] serious suspects—namely Thomas Blanton Jr., Herman Frank Cash, Robert Chambliss, and Bobby Frank Cherry, all Klan members—but witnesses were reluctant to talk and physical evidence was lacking. Also, at that time, information from our surveillance was not admissible in court. As a result, no federal charges were filed in the '60s."

On May 13, 1965, local investigators and the FBI formally named Blanton, Cash, Chambliss, and Cherry as the perpetrators of the bombing, with Robert Chambliss the likely ringleader of the four. This information was relayed to the Director of the FBI, J. Edgar Hoover; however, no prosecutions of the four suspects ensued. There had been a history of mistrust between local and federal investigators. Later the same year, J. Edgar Hoover formally blocked any impending federal prosecutions against the suspects, and refused to disclose any evidence his agents had obtained with state or federal prosecutors.

In 1968, the FBI formally closed their investigation into the bombing without filing charges against any of their named suspects. The files were sealed by order of J. Edgar Hoover.

=== Formal reopening of the investigation ===
Officially, the 16th Street Baptist Church bombing remained unsolved until after William Baxley was elected Attorney General of Alabama in January 1971. Baxley had been a student at the University of Alabama when he heard about the bombing in 1963, and later recollected: "I wanted to do something, but I didn't know what."

Within one week of being sworn into office, Baxley had researched original police files into the bombing, discovering that the original police documents were "mostly worthless". Baxley formally reopened the case in 1971. He was able to build trust with key witnesses, some of whom had been reluctant to testify in the first investigation. Other witnesses obtained identified Chambliss as the individual who had placed the bomb beneath the church. Baxley also gathered evidence proving Chambliss had purchased dynamite from a store in Jefferson County less than two weeks before the bomb was planted, upon the pretext the dynamite was to be used to clear land the KKK had purchased near Highway 101. This testimony of witnesses and evidence was used to formally construct a case against Robert Chambliss.

After Baxley requested access to the original FBI files on the case, he learned that evidence accumulated by the FBI against the named suspects between 1963 and 1965 had not been revealed to the local prosecutors in Birmingham. Although he met with initial resistance from the FBI, in 1976 Baxley was formally presented with some of the evidence which had been compiled by the FBI, after he publicly threatened to expose the Department of Justice for withholding evidence which could result in the prosecution of the perpetrators of the bombing.

==== Prosecution of Robert Chambliss ====
On November 14, 1977, Robert Chambliss, then aged 73, stood trial in Birmingham's Jefferson County Courthouse. Chambliss had been indicted by a grand jury on September 24, 1977, charged with four counts of murder, for each dead child in the 1963 church bombing. But at a pre-trial hearing on October 18, Judge Wallace Gibson ruled that the defendant would be tried upon one count of murder—that of Carol Denise McNair—and that the remaining three counts of murder would remain, but that he would not be charged in relation to these three deaths.

Before his trial, Chambliss remained free upon a $200,000 bond raised by family and supporters and posted October 18.

Chambliss pleaded not guilty to the charges, insisting that although he had purchased a case of dynamite less than two weeks before the bombing, he had given the dynamite to a Klansman and FBI agent provocateur named Gary Thomas Rowe Jr.

To discredit Chambliss's claims that Rowe had committed the bombing, prosecuting attorney William Baxley introduced two law enforcement officers to testify as to Chambliss's inconsistent claims of innocence. The first of these witnesses was Tom Cook, a retired Birmingham police officer, who testified on November 15 as to a conversation he had had with Chambliss in 1975. Cook testified that Chambliss had acknowledged his guilt regarding his 1963 arrest for possession of dynamite, but that he (Chambliss) was insistent he had given the dynamite to Rowe before the bombing. Following Cook's testimony, Baxley introduced police sergeant Ernie Cantrell. He testified that Chambliss had visited his headquarters in 1976 and that he had attempted to affix the blame for the 16th Street Baptist Church bombing upon an altogether different member of the KKK. Cantrell also stated that Chambliss had boasted of his knowledge of how to construct a "drip-method bomb" using a fishing float and a leaking bucket of water. (Upon cross-examination by defense attorney Art Hanes Jr., Cantrell conceded that Chambliss had emphatically denied bombing the church.)

One individual who went to the scene to help search for survivors, Charles Vann, later recollected that he had observed a solitary white man whom he recognized as Robert Edward Chambliss (a known member of the Ku Klux Klan) standing alone and motionless at a barricade. According to Vann's later testimony, Chambliss was standing "looking down toward the church, like a firebug watching his fire".

One of the key witnesses to testify on behalf of the prosecution was the Reverend Elizabeth Cobbs, Chambliss's niece. Reverend Cobbs stated that her uncle had repeatedly informed her he had been engaged in what he referred to as a "one-man battle" against blacks since the 1940s. Moreover, Cobbs testified on November 16 that, on the day before the bombing, Chambliss had told her that he had in his possession enough dynamite to "flatten half of Birmingham". Cobbs also testified that approximately one week after the bombing, she had observed Chambliss watching a news report relating to the four girls killed in the bombing. According to Cobbs, Chambliss had said: "It [the bomb] wasn't meant to hurt anybody ... it didn't go off when it was supposed to." Another witness to testify was William Jackson, who testified as to his joining the KKK in 1963 and becoming acquainted with Chambliss shortly thereafter. Jackson testified that Chambliss had expressed frustration that the Klan was "dragging its feet" on the issue of racial integration, and said he was eager to form a splinter group more dedicated to resistance.

In his closing argument before the jury on November 17, Baxley acknowledged that Chambliss was not the sole perpetrator of the bombing. He expressed regret that the state was unable to request the death penalty in this case, as the death penalty in effect in the state in 1963 had been repealed. The current state death penalty law applied only to crimes committed after its passage. Baxley noted that the day of the closing argument fell upon what would have been Carol Denise McNair's 26th birthday and that she would have likely been a mother by this date. He referred to testimony given by her father, Chris McNair, about the family's loss, and requested that the jury return a verdict of guilty.

In his rebuttal closing argument, defense attorney Art Hanes Jr. attacked the evidence presented by the prosecution as being purely circumstantial, adding that, despite the existence of similar circumstantial evidence, Chambliss had not been prosecuted in 1963 for the church bombing. Hanes noted conflicting testimony among several of the 12 witnesses called by the defense to testify as to Chambliss's whereabouts on the day of the bombing. A policeman and a neighbor had each testified that Chambliss was at the home of a man named Clarence Dill on that day.

Following the closing arguments, the jury retired to begin their deliberations, which lasted for over six hours and continued into the following day. On November 18, 1977, they found Robert Chambliss guilty of the murder of Carol Denise McNair. He was sentenced to life imprisonment for her murder. At his sentencing, Chambliss stood before the judge and stated: "Judge, your honor, all I can say is God knows I have never killed anybody, never have bombed anything in my life ... I didn't bomb that church."

On the same afternoon that Chambliss's guilty verdict was announced, prosecutor Baxley issued a subpoena to Thomas Blanton to appear in court about the 16th Street Baptist Church bombing. Although Baxley knew he had insufficient evidence to charge Blanton at this stage, he intended the subpoena to frighten Blanton into confessing his involvement and negotiating a plea deal to turn state evidence against his co-conspirators. Blanton, however, hired a lawyer and refused to answer any questions.

Chambliss appealed his conviction, as provided under the law, saying that much of the evidence presented at his trial—including testimony relating to his activities within the KKK—was circumstantial; that the 14-year delay between the crime and his trial violated his constitutional right to a speedy trial; and the prosecution had deliberately used the delay to try to gain an advantage over Chambliss's defense attorneys. This appeal was dismissed on May 22, 1979.

Robert Chambliss died in the Lloyd Noland Hospital and Health Center on October 29, 1985, at the age of 81. In the years since his incarceration, Chambliss had been confined to a solitary cell to protect him from attacks by fellow inmates. He had repeatedly proclaimed his innocence, insisting Gary Thomas Rowe Jr. was the actual perpetrator.

=== Later prosecutions ===
In 1995, ten years after Chambliss died, the FBI reopened its investigation into the church bombing. It was part of a coordinated effort between local, state and federal governments to review cold cases of the civil rights era in the hopes of prosecuting perpetrators. They unsealed 9,000 pieces of evidence previously gathered by the FBI in the 1960s (many of these documents relating to the 16th Street Baptist Church bombing had not been made available to DA William Baxley in the 1970s). In May 2000, the FBI publicly announced their findings that the 16th Street Baptist Church bombing had been committed by four members of the KKK splinter group known as the Cahaba Boys. The four individuals named in the FBI report were Blanton, Cash, Chambliss, and Cherry. By the time of the announcement, Herman Cash had also died; however, Thomas Blanton and Bobby Cherry were still alive. Both were arrested.

On May 16, 2000, a grand jury in Alabama indicted Thomas Edwin Blanton and Bobby Frank Cherry on eight counts each in relation to the 16th Street Baptist Church bombing. Both named individuals were charged with four counts of first-degree murder, and four counts of universal malice. The following day, both men surrendered to police.

The state prosecution had originally intended to try both defendants together; however, the trial of Bobby Cherry was delayed due to the findings of a court-ordered psychiatric evaluation. It concluded that vascular dementia had impaired his mind, therefore making Cherry mentally incompetent to stand trial or assist in his own defense.

On April 10, 2001, Judge James Garrett indefinitely postponed Cherry's trial, pending further medical analysis. In January 2002, Judge Garrett ruled Cherry mentally competent to stand trial and set an initial trial date for April 29.

==== Thomas Edwin Blanton ====
Thomas Edwin Blanton Jr. was brought to trial in Birmingham, Alabama, before Judge James Garrett on April 24, 2001. Blanton pleaded not guilty to the charges and chose not to testify on his behalf throughout the trial.

In his opening statement to the jurors, defense attorney John Robbins acknowledged his client's affiliation with the Ku Klux Klan and his views on racial segregation. But, he warned the jury: "Just because you don't like him, that doesn't make him responsible for the bombing."

The prosecution called a total of seven witnesses to testify in their case against Blanton, including relatives of the victims, John Cross, the former pastor of the 16th Street Baptist Church; an FBI agent named William Fleming, and Mitchell Burns, a former Klansman who had become a paid FBI informant. Burns had secretly recorded several conversations with Blanton in which the latter (Blanton) had gloated when talking about the bombing, and had boasted the police would not catch him when he bombed another church.

The most crucial piece of evidence presented at Blanton's trial was an audio recording secretly taped by the FBI in June 1964, in which Blanton was recorded discussing his involvement in the bombing with his wife, who can be heard accusing her husband of conducting an affair with a woman named Waylen Vaughn two nights before the bombing. Although sections of the recording—presented in evidence on April 27—are unintelligible, Blanton can twice be heard mentioning the phrase "plan a bomb" or "plan the bomb". Most crucially, Blanton can also be heard saying that he was not with Miss Vaughn but, two nights before the bombing, was at a meeting with other Klansmen on a bridge above the Cahaba River. He said: "You've got to have a meeting to plan a bomb."

In addition to calling attention to flaws in the prosecution's case, the defense exposed inconsistencies in the memories of some prosecution witnesses who had testified. Blanton's attorneys criticized the validity and quality of the 16 tape recordings introduced as evidence, arguing that the prosecution had edited and spliced the sections of the audio recording that were secretly obtained within Blanton's kitchen, reducing the entirety of the tape by 26 minutes. He said that the sections introduced as evidence were of poor audio quality, resulting in the prosecution presenting text transcripts of questionable accuracy to the jury. About the recordings made as Blanton conversed with Burns, Robbins emphasized that Burns had earlier testified that Blanton had never expressly said that he had made or planted the bomb. The defense portrayed the audiotapes introduced into evidence as the statements of "two rednecks driving around, drinking" and making false, ego-inflating claims to one another.

The trial lasted for one week. Seven witnesses testified on behalf of the prosecution, and two for the defense. One of the defense witnesses was a retired chef named Eddie Mauldin, who was called to testify to discredit prosecution witnesses' statements that they had seen Blanton in the vicinity of the church before the bombing. Mauldin testified on April 30 that he had observed two men in a Rambler station wagon adorned with a Confederate flag repeatedly drive past the church immediately before the blast, and that, seconds after the bomb had exploded, the car had "burned rubber" as it drove away. (Thomas Blanton had owned a Chevrolet in 1963; neither Chambliss, Cash nor Cherry had owned such a vehicle.)

Both counsels delivered their closing arguments before the jury on May 1. In his closing argument, prosecuting attorney and future U.S. Senator Doug Jones said that although the trial was conducted 38 years after the bombing, it was no less important, adding: "It's never too late for the truth to be told ... It's never too late for a man to be held accountable for his crimes." Jones reviewed Blanton's extensive history with the Ku Klux Klan, before referring to the audio recordings presented earlier in the trial. Jones repeated the most damning statements Blanton had made in these recordings, before pointing at Blanton and stating: "That is a confession out of this man's mouth."

Defense attorney John Robbins reminded the jury in his closing argument that his client was an admitted segregationist and a "loudmouth", but that was all that could be proven. He said this past was not the evidence upon which they should return their verdicts. Stressing that Blanton should not be judged for his beliefs, Robbins again vehemently criticized the validity and poor quality of the audio recordings presented, and the selectivity of the sections which had been introduced into evidence. Robbins also attempted to show that the testimony of FBI agent William Fleming, who had earlier testified as to a government witness claiming he had seen Blanton in the vicinity of the church shortly before the bombing, could have been mistaken.

The jury deliberated for two and a half hours before returning with a verdict finding Thomas Edwin Blanton guilty of four counts of first-degree murder. When asked by the judge whether he had anything to say before sentence was imposed, Blanton said: "I guess the Lord will settle it on Judgment Day."

Blanton was sentenced to life imprisonment. He was incarcerated at the St. Clair Correctional Facility in Springville, Alabama. Blanton was confined in a one-man cell under tight security. He seldom spoke of his involvement in the bombing, shunned social activity and rarely received visitors.

His first parole hearing was held on August 3, 2016. Relatives of the slain girls, prosecutor Doug Jones, Alabama Chief Deputy Attorney General Alice Martin, and Jefferson County district attorney Brandon Falls each spoke at the hearing to oppose Blanton's parole. Martin said: "The cold-blooded callousness of this hate crime has not diminished by the passage of time." The Board of Pardons and Paroles debated for less than 90 seconds before denying parole to Blanton.

Blanton died in prison from unspecified causes on June 26, 2020.

==== Bobby Frank Cherry ====
Bobby Frank Cherry was tried in Birmingham, Alabama, before Judge James Garrett, on May 6, 2002. Cherry pleaded not guilty to the charges and did not testify on his own behalf during the trial.

In his opening statement for the prosecution, Don Cochran presented his case: that the evidence would show that Cherry had participated in a conspiracy to commit the bombing and conceal evidence linking him to the crime and that he had later gloated over the deaths of the victims. Cochran also added that although the evidence to be presented would not conclusively show that Cherry had personally planted or ignited the bomb, the combined evidence would illustrate that he had aided and abetted in the commission of the act.

Cherry's defense attorney, Mickey Johnson, protested his client's innocence, citing that much of the evidence presented was circumstantial. He also noted that Cherry had initially been linked to the bombing by the FBI via an informant who had claimed, fifteen months after the bombing, that she had seen Cherry place the bomb at the church shortly before the bombing. Johnson warned the jurors they would have to distinguish between evidence and proof.

Following the opening statements, the prosecution began presenting witnesses. Crucial testimony at Cherry's trial was delivered by his former wife, Willadean Brogdon, who had married Cherry in 1970. Brogdon testified on May 16 that Cherry had boasted to her that he had been the individual who planted the bomb beneath the steps to the church, then returned hours later to light the fuse to the dynamite. Brogdon also testified that Cherry had told her of his regret that children had died in the bombing, before adding his satisfaction that they would never reproduce. Although the credibility of Brogdon's testimony was called into dispute at the trial, forensic experts conceded that, although her account of the planting of the bombing differed from that which had been discussed in the previous perpetrators' trials, Brogdon's recollection of Cherry's account of the planting and subsequent lighting of the bomb could explain why no conclusive remnants of a timing device were discovered after the bombing. (A fishing float attached to a section of wire, which may have been part of a timing device, was found 20 feet (6.1 m) from the explosion crater following the bombing. One of several vehicles severely damaged in the explosion was found to have carried fishing tackle.)

Barbara Ann Cross also testified for the prosecution. She is the daughter of the Reverend John Cross and was aged 13 in 1963. Cross had attended the same Sunday School class as the four victims on the day of the bombing and was slightly wounded in the attack. On May 15, Cross testified that prior to the explosion, she and the four girls killed had each attended a Youth Day Sunday School lesson in which the theme taught was how to react to a physical injustice. Cross testified that each girl present had been taught to contemplate how Jesus would react to affliction or injustice, and they were asked to learn to consider, "What Would Jesus Do?" Cross testified that she would usually have accompanied her friends into the basement lounge to change into robes for the forthcoming sermon, but she had been given an assignment. Shortly thereafter, she had heard "the most horrible noise", before being struck on the head by debris.

Throughout the trial, Cherry's defense attorney, Mickey Johnson, repeatedly observed that many of the prosecution's witnesses were either circumstantial or "inherently unreliable". Many of the same audiotapes presented in Blanton's trial were also introduced into evidence in the trial of Bobby Cherry. A key point contested as to the validity of the audiotapes being introduced into evidence, outside the hearing of the jury, was that Cherry had no grounds to contest the introduction of the tapes into evidence, as, under the Fourth Amendment, neither his home or property had been subject to discreet recording by the FBI. Don Cochran disputed this position, arguing that Alabama law provides for "conspiracies to conceal evidence" to be proven by both inference and circumstantial evidence. In spite of a rebuttal argument by the defense, Judge Garrett ruled that some sections were too prejudicial, but also that portions of some audio recordings could be introduced as evidence. Through these rulings, Mitchell Burns was called to testify on behalf of the prosecution. His testimony was restricted to the areas of the recordings permitted into evidence.

On May 21, 2002, both prosecution and defense attorneys delivered their closing arguments to the jury. In his closing argument for the prosecution, Don Cochran said the victims' "Youth Sunday [sermon] never happened ... because it was destroyed by this defendant's hate." Cochran outlined Cherry's extensive record of racial violence dating back to the 1950s, and noted that he had experience and training in constructing and installing bombs from his service as a Marine demolition expert. Cochran also reminded the jury of a secretly obtained FBI recording, which had earlier been introduced into evidence, in which Cherry had told his first wife, Jean, that he and other Klansmen had constructed the bomb within the premises of business the Friday before the bombing. He said that Cherry had signed an affidavit in the presence of the FBI on October 9, 1963, confirming that he, Chambliss, and Blanton were at these premises on this date.

In the closing argument for the defense, attorney Mickey Johnson argued that Cherry had nothing to do with the bombing, and reminded the jurors that his client was not on trial for his beliefs, stating: "It seems like more time has been spent here throwing around the n-word than proving what happened in September 1963." Johnson stated that there was no hard evidence linking Cherry to the bombing, but only evidence attesting to his racist beliefs dating from that era, adding that the family members who had testified against him were all estranged and therefore should be considered unreliable witnesses. Johnson urged the jury against convicting his client by association.

Following these closing arguments, the jury retired to consider their verdicts. These deliberations continued until the following day.

On the afternoon of May 22, after the jury had deliberated for almost seven hours, the forewoman announced they had reached their verdicts: Bobby Frank Cherry was convicted of four counts of first-degree murder and sentenced to life imprisonment. Cherry remained stoic as the sentence was read aloud. Relatives of the four victims openly wept in relief.

When asked by the judge whether he had anything to say before sentence was imposed, Cherry motioned to the prosecutors and stated: "This whole bunch lied through this thing [the trial]. I told the truth. I don't know why I'm going to jail for nothing. I haven't done anything!"

Bobby Frank Cherry died of cancer on November 18, 2004, at age 74, while incarcerated at the Kilby Correctional Facility.

Following the convictions of Blanton and Cherry, Alabama's former Attorney General, William Baxley, expressed his frustration that he had never been informed of the existence of the FBI audio recordings before they were introduced in the 2001 and 2002 trials. Baxley acknowledged that typical juries in 1960s Alabama would have likely leaned in favor of both defendants, even if these recordings had been presented as evidence, but said that he could have prosecuted Thomas Blanton and Bobby Cherry in 1977 if he had been granted access to these tapes. (A 1980 Justice Department report concluded that J. Edgar Hoover had blocked the prosecution of the four bombing suspects in 1965, and he officially closed the FBI's investigation in 1968.)

=== Other suspects ===
==== Herman Frank Cash ====
Cash had been a former senior member of the Eastview Klavern of the Ku Klux Klan. He had been arrested upon weapons charges three months prior to the 16th Street Baptist Church bombing while en route to a Klan anti-integration rally in Tuscaloosa. Cash was officially named as one of the four perpetrators of the church bombing by the FBI in May 1965; he was also named as a perpetrator following the conclusion of the 1995 reopening of the investigation. By the time of this announcement, Cash was already deceased, having died of cancer on February 7, 1994, at the age of 75. As such, he was never charged with his alleged involvement in the bombing.

Prior to Cash's death, he had repeatedly professed his innocence, and is known to have passed a polygraph test. Acquaintances of his are known to have claimed that, although overtly racist, Cash was too nervous an individual to have committed a crime of this magnitude.

==== Gary Thomas Rowe Jr. ====
Although both Blanton and Cherry denied their involvement in the 16th Street Baptist Church bombing, until his death in 1985, Robert Chambliss repeatedly insisted that the bombing had been committed by Gary Thomas Rowe Jr. Rowe had been encouraged to join the Klan by acquaintances in 1960. He became a paid FBI informant in 1961. In this role, Rowe acted as an agent provocateur between 1961 and 1965. Although informative to the FBI, Rowe actively participated in violence against both black and white civil rights activists. By Rowe's own later admission, while serving as an FBI informant, he had shot and killed an unidentified black man and had been an accessory to the murder of Viola Liuzzo.

Investigative records show that Rowe had twice failed polygraph tests when questioned as to his possible involvement in the 16th Street Baptist Church bombing and two separate, non-fatal explosions. These polygraph results had convinced some FBI agents of Rowe's culpability in the bombing. Prosecutors at Chambliss's 1977 trial had initially intended to call Rowe as a witness; however, Attorney General William Baxley had chosen not to call Rowe as a witness after being informed of the results of these polygraph tests.

Although never formally named as one of the conspirators by the FBI, Rowe's record of deception on the polygraph tests leaves open the possibility that Chambliss's claims may have held a degree of truth. Nonetheless, a 1979 investigation cleared Rowe of any involvement in the 16th Street Baptist Church bombing.

==== Other members of the KKK ====
In 1966, during a series of inquires before the House Un-American Activities Committee (HUAC), multiple members of the KKK were questioned about their potential involvement in the bombing. Most refused to answer the questions and plead the Fifth Amendment.

== Memorials ==
=== Wales Window for Alabama ===
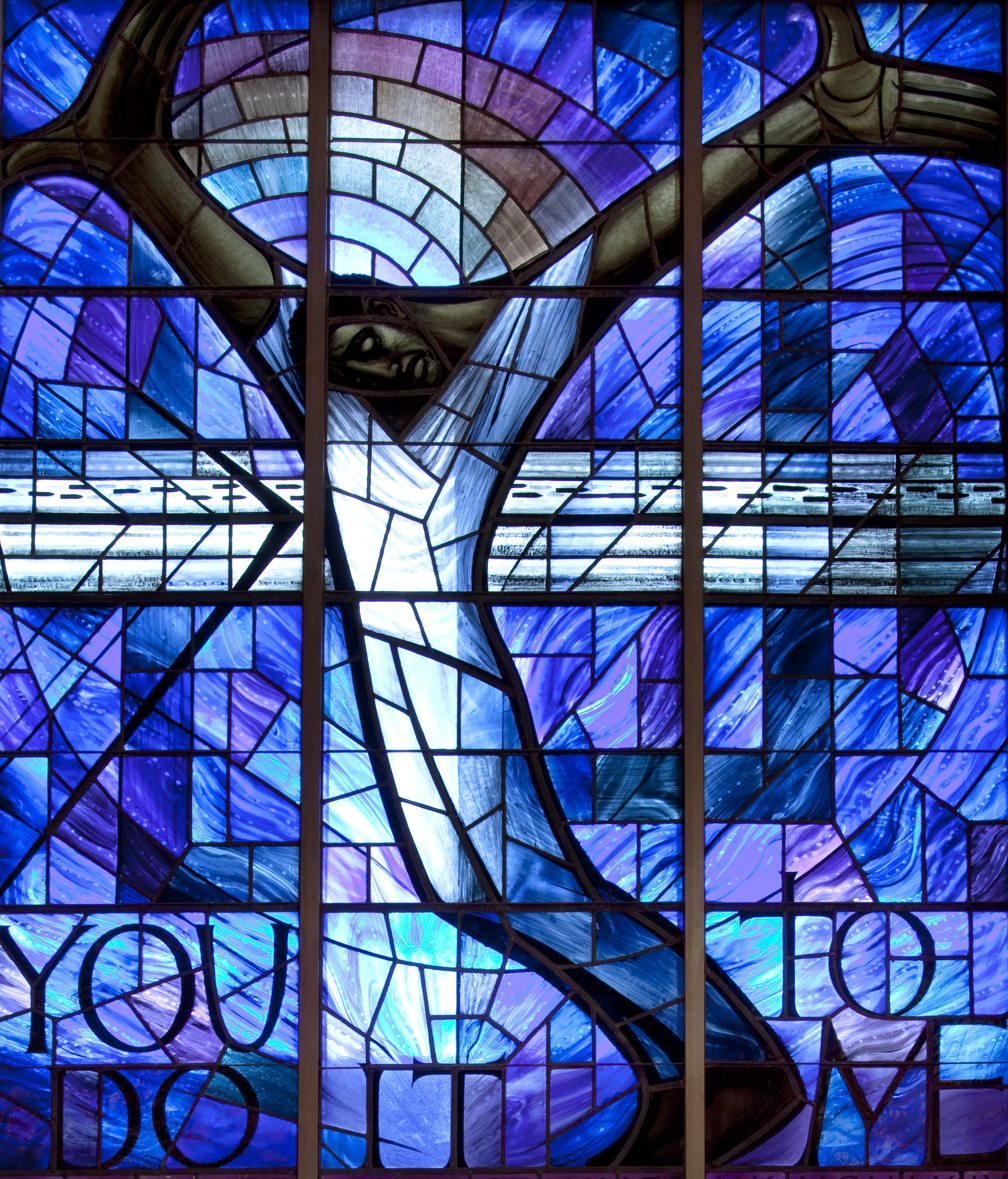
The Wales Window for Alabama. Designed by artist John Petts, the stained-glass window depicts a Black Christ with his arms outstretched; his right arm pushing away hatred and injustice, the left extended in an offering of forgiveness.

Shortly after the bombing, Welsh artist John Petts offered his services to create a new stained glass window to replace one that had been destroyed in the bombing. Together with newspaper editor David Cole, Petts launched a campaign in the Western Mail to request funds from the Welsh public to pay for the construction of and shipping from Wales and installation of the window in the church.

Petts, who designed and constructed the window, chose to depict a Black Christ, with arms outstretched, reminiscent of the Crucifixion of Jesus, to replace one of the windows destroyed in the bombing.

The window was installed in the church in 1965 over the front door of the sanctuary and has been named the Wales Window for Alabama.

=== Civil Rights Memorial ===
The names of the four girls killed in the 16th Street Baptist Church bombing are engraved upon the Civil Rights Memorial. Erected in Montgomery, Alabama in 1989. The Civil Rights Memorial is an inverted, conical granite fountain and is dedicated to 41 people who died in the struggle for the equal rights and integrated treatment of all people between the years 1954 and 1968. The names of the 41 individuals themselves are chronologically engrained upon the surface of this fountain. Creator Maya Lin has described this sculpture as a "contemplative area; a place to remember the Civil Rights Movement, to honour those killed during the struggle, to appreciate how far the country has come in its quest for equality".

=== Greenwood Cemetery state historic marker ===
On the 27th anniversary of the 16th Street Baptist Church bombing, a state historic marker was unveiled at Greenwood Cemetery, the final resting place of three of the four victims of the bombing (Carole Robertson's body had been reburied in Greenwood Cemetery in 1974, following the death of her father). Several dozen people were present at the unveiling, presided over by state Senator Roger Bedford. At the service, the four girls were described as martyrs who "died so freedom could live".

=== Four Spirits memorial sculpture ===
The Four Spirits sculpture, unveiled at Birmingham's Kelly Ingram Park, September 2013

The Four Spirits sculpture was unveiled at Birmingham's Kelly Ingram Park in September 2013 to commemorate the 50th anniversary of the bombing. Crafted in Berkeley, California by Birmingham-born sculptor Elizabeth MacQueen and designed as a memorial to the four children killed on September 15, 1963, the bronze and steel life-size sculpture depicts the four girls in preparation for the church sermon at the 16th Street Baptist Church in the moments immediately before the explosion. The youngest girl killed in the explosion (Carol Denise McNair) is depicted releasing six doves into the air as she stands tiptoed and barefooted upon a bench as another barefooted girl (Addie Mae Collins) is depicted kneeling upon the bench, affixing a dress sash to McNair; a third girl (Cynthia Wesley) is sat upon the bench alongside McNair and Collins with a Bible in her lap. The fourth girl (Carole Robertson) is depicted standing and smiling as she motions the other three girls to attend their church sermon.

At the base of the sculpture is an inscription of the title of the sermon the four girls were to attend before the bombing—"A Love That Forgives". Oval photographs and brief biographies of the four girls killed in the explosion, the most seriously injured survivor (Sarah Collins), and the two teenage boys who were shot to death later that day also adorn the base of the sculpture. More than 1,000 people were present at the unveiling of the memorial, including survivors of the bombing, friends of the victims and the parents of Denise McNair, Johnny Robinson and Virgil Ware. Among those to speak at the unveiling was the Reverend Joseph Lowery, who informed those present: "Don't let anybody tell you these children died in vain. We wouldn't be here right now, had they not gone home before our eyes."

=== Congressional Gold Medal ===
On May 24, 2013, President Barack Obama awarded a posthumous Congressional Gold Medal to the four girls killed in the 1963 Birmingham Church Bombing. This medal was awarded through signing into effect Public Law 113–11; a bill which awarded one Congressional Gold Medal to be created in recognition of the fact the girls' deaths served as a major catalyst for the Civil Rights Movement, and invigorated a momentum ensuring the signing into passage of the Civil Rights Act of 1964. The gold medal was presented to the Birmingham Civil Rights Institute to display or loan to other museums.

== Media and arts ==
=== Music ===
- The song "Birmingham Sunday" is directly inspired by the 16th Street Baptist Church bombing. Written in 1964 by Richard Fariña and recorded by Fariña's sister-in-law, Joan Baez, the song was included on Baez's 1964 album Joan Baez/5. The song would also be covered by Rhiannon Giddens, and is included on her 2017 album Freedom Highway.
- Nina Simone's 1964 civil rights anthem "Mississippi Goddam" is partially inspired by the 16th Street Baptist Church bombing. The lyric "Alabama's got me so upset" refers to this incident.
- Jazz musician John Coltrane's 1964 album Live at Birdland includes the track "Alabama", recorded two months after the bombing. This song was written as a direct musical tribute to the victims of the 16th Street Baptist Church bombing.
- African-American composer Adolphus Hailstork's 1982 work for wind ensemble titled American Guernica was composed in memory of the victims of the 16th Street Baptist Church bombing.
- The song "1963" by Alabama-born soul singer Candi Staton is directly inspired by the 16th Street Baptist Church bombing. Staton has stated she was present in Birmingham on the day of the bombing.

=== Film ===
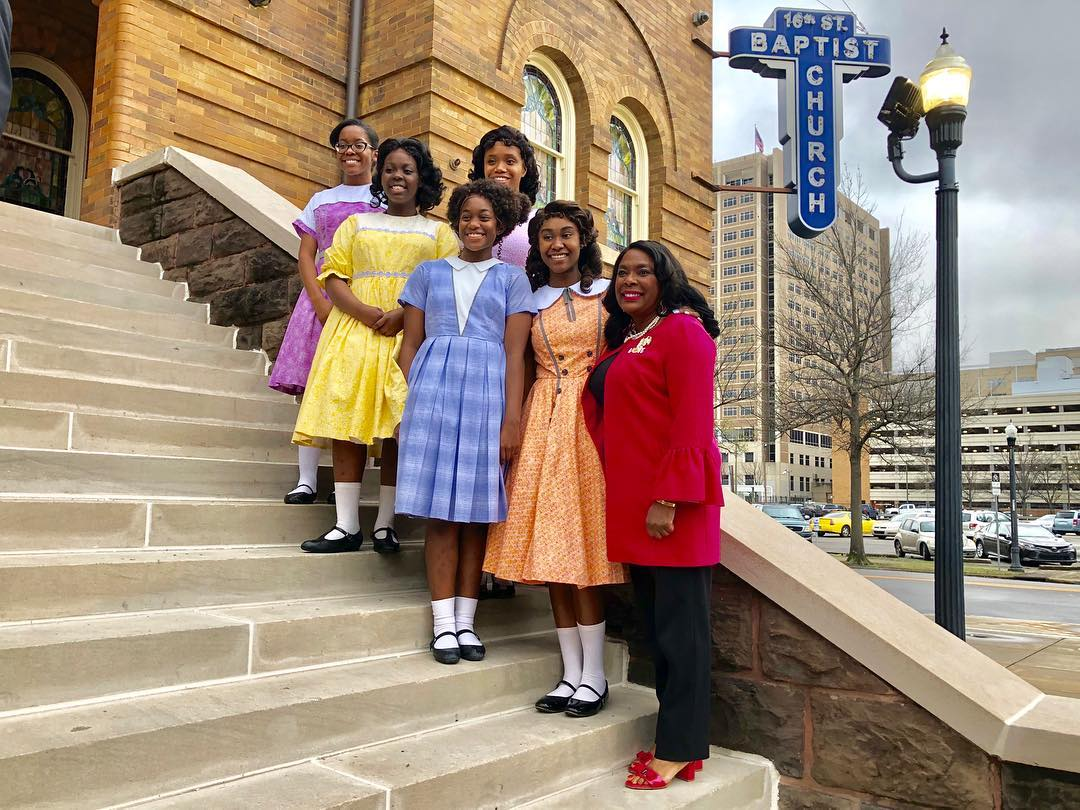
Politician Terri Sewell, with actresses from the play 4 Little Girls, pictured upon the steps of the 16th Street Baptist Church (2019)

- A 1997 documentary, 4 Little Girls, exclusively focuses on the 16th Street Baptist Church bombing. Directed by Spike Lee, this documentary includes interviews with family and friends of the victims and received an Academy Award nomination for Best Documentary.
- 2002 docudrama, Sins of the Father, directly focuses on the 16th Street Baptist Church bombing. Directed by Robert Dornhelm, the film casts Richard Jenkins as Bobby Cherry and Bruce McFee as Robert Chambliss.
- The 2014 American historical drama, Selma, which focuses on the 1965 Selma to Montgomery marches, also includes a scene which depicts the 16th Street Baptist Church bombing. This film was directed by Ava DuVernay.

=== Television ===
- The 1993 documentary Angels of Change focuses on the events leading up to the 16th Street Baptist Church bombing as well as the aftermath of the bombing. This documentary was produced by the Birmingham-based TV station WVTM-TV and subsequently received a Peabody Award.
- The History Channel has broadcast a documentary entitled Remembering the Birmingham Church Bombing. Broadcast to commemorate the 50th anniversary of the bombing, this documentary includes interviews with the head of education at the Birmingham Civil Rights Institute.

=== Books (non-fiction) ===
- Anderson, Susan (2008). The Past on Trial: The Sixteenth Street Baptist Church Bombing, Civil Rights Memory and the Remaking of Birmingham. Chapel Hill. ISBN 978-0-54988-141-4.
- Branch, Taylor (1988). Parting the Waters: America in the King Years, 1954–1963. Simon & Schuster. ISBN 978-0-671-68742-7.
- Chalmers, David (2005). Backfire: How the Ku Klux Klan Helped the Civil Rights Movement. Chapel Hill. ISBN 978-0-7425-2311-1.
- Cobbs, Elizabeth H.; Smith, Petric J. (1994). Long Time Coming: An Insider's Story of the Birmingham Church Bombing that Rocked the World. Crane Hill Publishers. ISBN 978-1-881548-10-2.
- Hamlin, Christopher M. (1998). Behind the Stained Glass: A History of Sixteenth Street Baptist Church. Crane Hill Publishers. ISBN 978-1-57587-083-0.
- Jones, Doug (2019). Bending Toward Justice: The Birmingham Church Bombing that Changed the Course of Civil Rights. All Points Books. ISBN 9781250201447.
- Klobuchar, Lisa (2009). 1963 Birmingham Church Bombing: The Ku Klux Klan's History of Terror. Compass Point Books. ISBN 978-0-7565-4092-0.
- McKinstry, Carolyn; George, Denise (2011). While the World Watched: A Birmingham Bombing Survivor Comes of Age During the Civil Rights Movement. Tyndale House Publishers. ISBN 978-1-4143-3636-7.
- McWhorter, Diane (2001). Carry Me Home: Birmingham, Alabama, the Climactic Battle of the Civil Rights Revolution. Simon & Schuster. ISBN 978-1-4767-0951-2.
- Sikora, Frank (1991). Until Justice Rolls Down: The Birmingham Church Bombing Case. University of Alabama Press. ISBN 978-0-8173-0520-8.
- Thorne, T. K. (2013). Last Chance for Justice: How Relentless Investigators Uncovered New Evidence Convicting the Birmingham Church Bombers. Lawrence Books. ISBN 978-1-61374-864-0.

=== Books (fiction) ===
- Christopher Paul Curtis's 1995 novel The Watsons Go to Birmingham – 1963 conveys the events of the bombing. This fictional account of the bombing was later converted into a movie.
- The 2001 novel Bombingham, written by Anthony Grooms, is set in Birmingham in 1963. This novel portrays a fictional account of the bombing of the 16th Street Baptist Church and the shootings of Virgil Ware and Johnny Robinson.
- The American Girl book No Ordinary Sound, set in 1963 and featuring the character of Melody Ellison, has the bombing as a major plot point.

=== Arts ===
- The American sculptor John Henry Waddell has created a memorial symbolizing those killed in the bombing. Entitled That Which Might Have Been: Birmingham 1963, the sculpture—depicting four adult women in differing postures—was created over a period of 15 months. The four women in the sculpture are each depicted in symbolic terms; representing the four victims of the bombing, had they been allowed to mature to womanhood. The sculpture was originally displayed at the First Unitarian Universalist Church in Phoenix in 1969. A second casting of the sculpture was intended for display in Birmingham; however, due to controversy over the nudity of the women depicted in the sculpture, this second casting is now on display at the George Washington Carver Museum.

== See also ==
- African-American history
- African Americans in Alabama
- Domestic terrorism in the United States
- Mass racial violence in the United States
- Racial segregation of churches in the United States
- Racism against Black Americans
- Racism in the United States
- Terrorism in the United States
- Timeline of African-American history
- Timeline of terrorist attacks in the United States
- Timeline of the civil rights movement

== Cited works and further reading ==
- Branch, Taylor (1988). Parting the Waters: America in the King Years, 1954–1963. Simon & Schuster. ISBN 978-0-671-68742-7.
- Cobbs, Elizabeth H.; Smith, Petric J. (1994). Long Time Coming: An Insider's Story of the Birmingham Church Bombing that Rocked the World. Crane Hill Publishers. ISBN 978-1-881548-10-2.
- Hamlin, Christopher M. (1998). Behind the Stained Glass: A History of Sixteenth Street Baptist Church. Crane Hill Publishers. ISBN 978-1-57587-083-0.
- Klobuchar, Lisa (2009). 1963 Birmingham Church Bombing: The Ku Klux Klan's History of Terror. Compass Point Books. ISBN 978-0-7565-4092-0.
- McKinstry, Carolyn; George, Denise (2011). While the World Watched: A Birmingham Bombing Survivor Comes of Age During the Civil Rights Movement. Tyndale House Publishers. ISBN 978-1-4143-3636-7.
- Sikora, Frank (1991). Until Justice Rolls Down: The Birmingham Church Bombing Case. University of Alabama Press. ISBN 978-0-8173-0520-8.
- Thorne, T. K. (2013). Last Chance for Justice: How Relentless Investigators Uncovered New Evidence Convicting the Birmingham Church Bombers. Lawrence Books. ISBN 978-1-61374-864-0.
- Wade, Wyn C. (1998). The Fiery Cross: The Ku Klux Klan in America. Oxford University Press. ISBN 978-0-19-512357-9.
