= Charles Morgan Jr. =

American civil rights attorney (1930–2009)

- Born: March 11, 1930; Cincinnati, Ohio, U.S.
- Died: January 8, 2009 (aged 78); Destin, Florida, U.S.
- Education: University of Alabama
- Occupation: Attorney
- Known for: Reynolds v. Sims; Representing Julian Bond and Muhammad Ali

Charles "Chuck" Morgan Jr. (March 11, 1930 – January 8, 2009) was an American civil rights attorney from Alabama who played a key role in establishing the principle of "one man, one vote" in the Supreme Court of the United States decision in the 1964 case Reynolds v. Sims and represented Julian Bond and Muhammad Ali in their legal battles.

== Biography ==
=== Early life ===
Morgan was born in Cincinnati, Ohio, on March 11, 1930, and was raised in Kentucky. He moved with his family to Birmingham, Alabama, at the age of 15. Morgan attended the University of Alabama, where he earned his law degree and met his wife, the former Camille Walpole.

=== Civil rights involvement ===
The day after the 16th Street Baptist Church bombing that killed four black girls in Birmingham in September 1963, Morgan spoke out publicly at a lunch time meeting he was having with the Birmingham Young Men's Business Club, in the middle of the city's white establishment, to blame community leaders for their role in failing to stand up to the climate of racial hatred, stating that "Every person in this community who has in any way contributed during the past several years to the popularity of hatred is at least as guilty, or more so, than the demented fool who threw that bomb". Morgan stated: "Four little girls were killed in Birmingham yesterday. A mad, remorseful worried community asks, 'Who did it? Who threw that bomb? Was it a Negro or a white?' The answer should be, 'We all did it.' Every last one of us is condemned for that crime and the bombing before it and a decade ago. We all did it." Morgan accused Birmingham's white leaders of nurturing the violent air of discrimination that already existed. His statements harmed his legal practice and led to death threats against him and his family. These threats caused Morgan to have to close his law practice down and move his family out of Birmingham.

The two biggest points of democratic power Morgan focused on were voting and equal dealing of justice among all citizens but specifically for Southern blacks. As the Civil Rights Movement was progressing, separatism became a more prevalent and widespread idea. But Morgan did not support it, favoring integration over separatism. Morgan had always had close ties and favorable relations with groups he did not necessarily agree with, though, such as segregationists and "silent moderates".

Charles Morgan was a Democrat his entire life. He was attracted first to populist James E. Folsom, Governor of Alabama for two non-consecutive terms from 1947 to 1959. Morgan particularly supported Folsom's early beliefs in integration. Folsom stated, "As long as the Negroes are held down by deprivation and lack of opportunity, the other poor people will be held down alongside them," in 1949.

Harrison Salisbury wrote a controversial piece in The New York Times in 1960 that corresponded with Morgan's future tones and beliefs. Bureaucrats sued the paper on claims of libel. The court subpoenaed Reverend Robert Hughes, who was a white Methodist minister and also director of the Alabama Council on Human Relations, for records of those who supported the council; Hughes wanted to fight the subpoena, so he asked Charles Morgan to represent him. Because he represented Hughes (called a "nigger lover" by whites and racists) in the case, the Ku Klux Klan began to harass Morgan. He received anonymous phone calls, harassment in the courthouse from members, and various threats. Because of this, Morgan became more radical in his practices and beliefs. He represented Boaz Sanders, a black murder defendant, and sued his own alma mater, the University of Alabama, because they would not admit two black men to the school.

=== Trials ===
In 1964, he established the Southern Regional Office for the American Civil Liberties Union (ACLU) in Atlanta. He fought three court cases concerning Vietnam War protests as a leader of the ACLU. Through these cases, he was responsible for directing international attention to the limitations placed on soldiers' free speech. In 1972, the ACLU named Morgan as the legislative director of its national office in Washington, D.C. Morgan led the ACLU's effort to have President Richard Nixon impeached from office. In June 1973, though there was little talk of impeachment among the public, Morgan predicted to his staff that Nixon would be removed from office "by the end of the year." He edited and published a 56-page handbook entitled "Why President Richard Nixon Should Be Impeached," explaining the process, which the public barely knew about. He circulated it to all members of the United States Congress.

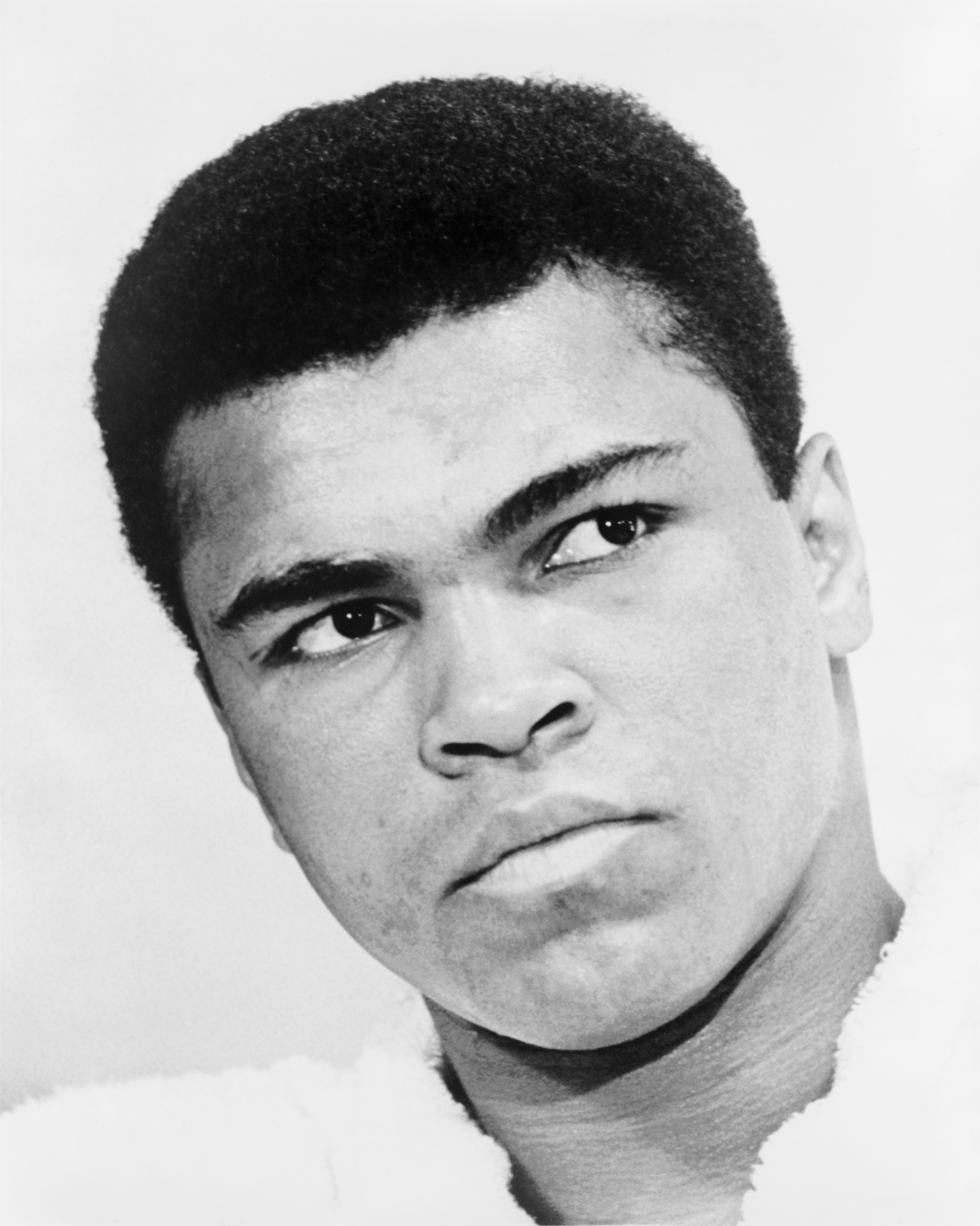
Muhammad Ali in 1967

Morgan and a group of other lawyers filed a lawsuit in 1962 that aimed to require reapportionment of the Alabama Legislature, to undo a system under which rural counties in southern Alabama had far greater voting strength than areas in the urbanized northern portion of the state. In the 1964 Supreme Court case Reynolds v. Sims, Morgan successfully argued that districts in state legislatures needed to be of nearly equal size, establishing the principle of "one man, one vote" to effectively end the use of gerrymandering that gave greater political power to the rural legislators who controlled the Alabama Legislature. Morgan was also a part of the White v. Crook case. This case caused Alabama juries to become racially integrated and declared that barring women from the Alabama juries was unconstitutional. Another case Morgan was involved in was Whitus v. Georgia of 1967. In this case, five Georgian death penalty convictions were set aside because the case declared discriminatory juries as a result of racially segregated tax digests unconstitutional.

After Julian Bond was prevented from taking his seat in the Georgia House of Representatives after having made statements opposing United States involvement in the Vietnam War, Morgan appealed to the United States Supreme Court successfully to have Bond seated.

He also served on Muhammad Ali's legal team that appealed his conviction on draft evasion after Ali refused to serve during the Vietnam War citing religious objections, and successfully appealed the case before the U.S. Supreme Court.

In 1967, Morgan represented Howard Levy who was court-martialed in 1967 at Fort Jackson, South Carolina, after Levy refused an order to teach dermatology to medical aidmen serving in the Green Berets since he considered the Special Forces "killers of peasants and murderers of women and children". Morgan raised the Nuremberg Defense on behalf of Levy, arguing that U.S. troops were committing atrocities in Vietnam and that American soldiers can lawfully refuse to obey orders related to Vietnam service. Levy was sentenced to three years in prison, and was released after serving more than two years.

At a party in Washington, D.C., an attendee from New York indicated that he would not vote for Jimmy Carter for president because of his Southern accent, to which Morgan replied "That's bigotry, and that makes you a bigot." Aryeh Neier, the ACLU's executive director, reprimanded Morgan, and criticized Morgan for taking a public position on a candidate for public office. Morgan resigned from his post in April 1976, citing efforts by the bureaucracy at the ACLU to restrict his public statements.

=== Private practice and later life ===
After leaving the ACLU, Morgan spent the remainder of his career in private practice. He represented the Tobacco Institute in its opposition to smoking bans and won a number of cases for Sears, Roebuck and Company in which the Equal Employment Opportunity Commission (EEOC) had accused the company of racial and sexual discrimination due not to complaints from employees but rather due to EEOC analysis of data from Sears which was interpreted as evidence of discrimination. Sears won their case, in part, because the EEOC was unable to produce a single witness who alleged discriminatory hiring or promotion within Sears.

During his lifetime, Charles Morgan wrote two books: A Time to Speak (describing his experiences prior to 1963) and One Man, One Vote (describing his experiences in the 1960s and 1970s). In A Time to Speak, Morgan wrote: "What's it like living in Birmingham? No one ever really has known and no one will until this city becomes part of the United States. Birmingham is not a dying city; it is dead."

Morgan died at age 78 on January 8, 2009, at his home in Destin, Florida, as a result of complications from Alzheimer's disease.

== Works ==
- Charles Morgan: A Time to Speak. New York : Holt, Rinehart and Winston, 1964. ISBN 0-03-013956-2
