= John Crosse =

John Crosse may refer to:

- John Crosse (antiquary) (1786–1833), British antiquary and music writer
- John Crosse (announcer) (1941–2025), British radio DJ and announcer
- John Crosse (priest) (1739–1816), English evangelical cleric
- John Green Crosse (1790–1850), British surgeon
- Sir John Crosse, 2nd Baronet (c. 1700–1762), British baronet and Member of Parliament

== See also ==
- John Cross (disambiguation)
- Crosse (surname)
