= Herman Frank Cash =

Suspect in the 16th Street Baptist Church bombing

- Born: July 25, 1918; Pinson, Alabama, U.S.
- Died: February 7, 1994 (aged 75); Pinson, Alabama, U.S.
- Resting place: Northview Cemetery; Cedartown, Georgia, U.S.
- Known for: Suspected co-conspirator in the 16th Street Baptist Church bombing
- Criminal charge: None
- Criminal status: Deceased
- Spouse: Myrtle Cash
- Children: 2

Herman Frank Cash (July 25, 1918 – February 7, 1994) was a suspected conspirator in the 1963 16th Street Baptist Church bombing. Thomas Edwin Blanton Jr., Robert Edward Chambliss, and Bobby Frank Cherry were all convicted and sentenced to prison for their involvement in the bombing.

Cash died in 1994 and was never charged or tried for his alleged involvement in the bombing.

== Life ==
During World War II, Cash served in the United States Army.

Cash was married to Myrtle Cash and had two children, Carolyn and Maurice. He was a truck driver for Dixie-Ohio Express Company. Cash was a member of United Klans of America, a Ku Klux Klan organization.

In December 1962, Cash was a leader of the Eastview Klavern #13 of the Ku Klux Klan.

In June 1963, Cash was arrested on weapons charges while driving with other segregationists to a Klan rally being held in Tuscoloosa, Alabama. Upon searching the vehicle, the police found a 38-caliber revolver, an army bayonet, a cotton hook that belonged to Cash, three other bayonets, two night sticks and three pistols.

Cash died in 1994 in Pinson, Alabama without ever being charged in relation to the bombing.

== Bombing role ==
Although officially named by the Federal Bureau of Investigation (FBI) as a suspect as early as 1965, Cash was never formally charged with any crime. He maintained his innocence and passed a polygraph test given by the FBI. Acquaintances claimed that Cash was too nervous to be capable of committing a crime of the magnitude of the bombing.

== See also ==
- Thomas Edwin Blanton Jr.
- Bobby Frank Cherry
- Robert Edward Chambliss
- African-American history
- Civil Rights Movement
- Birmingham campaign
- Mass racial violence in the United States
