= John H. Cross =

John Henry Cross (September 25, 1925, Lynn, Massachusetts – November 19, 2010, Silver Spring, Maryland) was an American parasitologist. He served in the Navy in the Solomon Islands, in the Pacific Theater of the war, during World War II. In 1945, as the war drew to a close, he joined the nascent United Nations Relief and Rehabilitation Administration in Shanghai, China where he met his wife, Evelyn Chang. They married in 1952, after returning to the United States for advanced education.

Cross was Scientific Director of Naval Medical Research Unit Two (NAMRU-2) from 1966 to 1984, a professor at the Uniformed Services University of the Health Sciences, where he was appointed an emeritus professor in retirement, and where he continued teaching and inspiring up until his final illness.

== Citations ==
- Brown, Emma (2010) "A Local Life: John Cross, 85; parasitologist solved mysterious illness in the Philippines" 'Washington Post' https://www.washingtonpost.com/wp-dyn/content/article/2010/12/25/AR2010122501893_2.html.
- Clayton, Charles C. (1971) "Fighters against tropical disease" http://taiwantoday.tw/ct.asp?xItem=135787&ctNode=124
- Echeverria, Peter; Ramirez, Gilbert; Blacklow, Neil R.; Ksiazek, Thomas; Cukor, George; Cross, John H. (1979). "Travelers' Diarrhea among U.S. Army Troops in South Korea". The Journal of Infectious Diseases. 139 (2): 215–219. JSTOR 30110507.
- https://web.archive.org/web/20101223184648/http://www.astmh.org/source/blog/post.cfm/in-memoriam-john-h-cross
- http://www.antimicrobe.org/authors/john_cross.asp
- Edwards, Jim (2011) "Obituary: John H Cross, 1925 - 2010" World Veterinary Association
