= John Cross Jr. =

American activist and pastor

John H. Cross Jr. (January 27, 1925 – November 15, 2007) was an American pastor and Civil Rights activist. He was best known as the pastor of the 16th Street Baptist Church, an African American Baptist congregation in Birmingham, Alabama, at the time of the church's racially motivated bombing in 1963. The bombing, which ripped through the church and killed four young girls, became a rallying cry for the Civil Rights Movement and propelled the problems of racial segregation in The South into the national spotlight. Cross spent much of the rest of his life working for racial reconciliation in the South.

== Biography ==
John Cross Jr. was born on January 27, 1925, in Haynes, Arkansas. His parents were Margie Ann and John H. Cross Sr. He became interested in the ministry very early in life when he gave his first trial sermon as a teenager. Cross joined the U.S. Army in 1944 as an assistant regimental chaplain soon after graduating from high school.

Cross left the army following World War II. Cross enrolled at Virginia Union University, a historically African American university in Richmond, Virginia, where he received his bachelor's degree in 1950. He later also received a master's degree in divinity from Virginia Union University in 1959.

Cross met his wife, Julia Ball, who was also a student at Virginia Union University. The couple married on September 3, 1949. Julia Cross died in 2003.

Cross died of natural causes on November 15, 2007. He was 82 years old. Reverend Cross is interred at Hillandale Memorial Gardens in DeKalb County, Georgia.

== 16th Street Baptist Church ==
John Cross Jr was named the new pastor of the 16th Street Baptist Church in 1962. He was serving as a pastor of a Baptist church in Richmond, Virginia at the time. Cross was asked to serve at the church because he seemed to be a good match for its congregation, who largely consisted of conservative, well educated African Americans. Cross had no real previous experience as either a civil rights activist or in the civil rights movement before arriving in Birmingham.

Cross's new city, Birmingham, Alabama, was one of the most volatile flashpoints in the South at the time. The city had earned the nickname of "Bombingham" by 1962 due to the large number of racially charged bombings during the 1950s and early 1960s. It was considered a stronghold of the Ku Klux Klan, who often perpetuated random violence against the city's black population. Birmingham's notorious public safety commissioner, Eugene "Bull" Connor, was well known for turning high-powered fire hoses and attack dogs on protesters.
