= Virgil Lamar Ware =

African-American teenager shot dead after the Birmingham church bombing

- Born: December 6, 1949; Birmingham, Alabama, U.S.
- Died: September 15, 1963 (aged 13); Birmingham, Alabama, U.S.
- Occupation: Student

Virgil Lamar Ware (December 6, 1949 – September 15, 1963) was an African-American eighth-grader shot to death after the Birmingham church bombing.

== Personal life ==
Growing up in Pratt City, Alabama, Ware was the third of six brothers. He was an eighth-grade A student, on the football team, and had aspirations to become a lawyer. He had a job as a paper boy with his brother James when the shooting occurred.

== Death and afterward ==
On September 15, 1963, Larry Joe Sims and Michael Lee Farley, both 16, had planned to attend a white supremacist rally and motorcade from the suburb of Midfield to the downtown of Birmingham. The event was canceled after the bombing at the urging of Jefferson County sheriff's deputies. They rode on Farley's motor scooter to the headquarters of the neo-fascist National States' Rights Party where they purchased a Confederate battle flag, which they attached to the scooter before riding toward a Black neighborhood. Upon seeing Virgil and his brother James, who were unaware of the bombing and riding together on a single bicycle, Farley handed Sims a .22-caliber pistol that they had bought three days earlier and told Sims to shoot at them to scare them. It ended in Virgil being shot in the cheek and chest.

An all-white jury convicted both youths of second-degree manslaughter. The judge sentenced both of them to seven months of jail, but suspended their sentences in favor of two years of probation.

In 1997, the crime came back into the public spotlight after U. S. District Judge James Ware, a Birmingham native and nominee for the United States Court of Appeals for the Ninth Circuit, claimed that his career was inspired by the death of Virgil, whom he claimed was his brother. When it was revealed that the two were not related, James Ware withdrew his nomination, apologized, and was reprimanded. The publicity around the scandal prompted Michael Farley, now 50, to contact the Ware family and privately apologize to them. In 2003, Sims, spurred by a recent TIME article about Ware, also privately apologized to his family.

Ware was buried in an unmarked grave on the side of the road until May 6, 2004, when he was moved to a burial place with a bronze marker thanks to the donations of the community.

As of 2013, he has been inducted into Birmingham's Gallery of Distinguished Citizens.

Ware's name is among those inscribed on a memorial in Birmingham dedicated in November 1989 to those killed during the civil rights movement.

His family has become greatly involved in the civil rights movement as a result of his death.
