= Bobby Frank Cherry =

American terrorist and murderer (1930–2004)

- Born: June 20, 1930; Clanton, Alabama, U.S.
- Died: November 18, 2004 (aged 74); Kilby Correctional Facility, Mount Meigs, Alabama, U.S.
- Resting place: Payne Springs Cemetery, Payne Springs
- Occupations: Truck driver, welder, business owner
- Known for: Participant in the 16th Street Baptist Church bombing
- Status: Deceased
- Motive: White supremacy
- Conviction: First degree murder (4 counts)
- Penalty: Life imprisonment
- Accomplices: Robert Edward Chambliss; Thomas Edwin Blanton Jr.

Bobby Frank Cherry (June 20, 1930 – November 18, 2004) was an American white supremacist, terrorist, and Klansman who was convicted of murder in 2002 for his role in the 16th Street Baptist Church bombing in 1963. The bombing killed four young African-American girls (Carole Robertson, Cynthia Wesley, Addie Mae Collins, and Denise McNair) and injured more than 20 other people.

== Life ==
Bobby Frank Cherry was born on June 20, 1930, in Mineral Springs, a neighborhood of Clanton, Alabama. He joined the United States Marine Corps as a youth, where he gained expertise in demolitions and working with explosives. After his time with the Marines, Cherry worked a series of low-paying jobs, including a long stint as a truck driver.

Cherry was married at the time of the bombing. He and his wife, Virginia, had seven children together. Their marriage was tumultuous and, at times, violent. Cherry expected deference from his wife and children, using beatings to enforce his authority. Virginia Cherry died of cancer in 1968. After her death, Bobby Cherry placed the children in the Gateway Mercy Home Orphanage and with relatives. He eventually remarried four times, including to third wife, Willadean Brogdon. She would later testify at Cherry's trial that he had bragged about his role in the church bombing. Cherry left Birmingham in the early 1970s and moved to the suburbs of Dallas, Texas. He worked as a welder and owned a carpet cleaning business in Grand Prairie. In 1988, he suffered a heart attack and moved again, this time to Henderson County, Texas, with fifth wife, Myrtle.

During his trial, the prosecution presented evidence that Cherry, a white man, had assaulted black minister Fred Shuttlesworth in 1957 using a set of brass knuckles. The minister had been working to integrate a school in Birmingham, Alabama. The prosecution also discussed an incident in which Cherry had allegedly pistol-whipped a black man in a restaurant after the man insulted Cherry.

On the morning of the bombing, Cherry was with his son Tom at the Modern Sign Company a few blocks away from the church. The two were silkscreening Confederate rebel flags. Tom Cherry later said that he could clearly hear the sound of an explosion happening nearby and knew that something bad had happened.

== Murder trial ==
Cherry was originally supposed to be tried at the same time as (though not jointly with) fellow defendant Thomas Edwin Blanton Jr. Cherry was able to successfully delay his trial by claiming that vascular dementia had impaired his mind and that his health would prevent him from assisting in his own defense. Blanton was convicted and Cherry was eventually found mentally competent to stand trial. At his trial, he denied his involvement in the bombing as well as his affiliation with the Ku Klux Klan, but he was ultimately found guilty.

=== Testimony and recordings ===
Cherry's son, Thomas Frank Cherry, testified that his father was a member of the United Klans of America, a Ku Klux Klan group, and relatives and friends testified that he "bragged" about having played a role in the bombing. Ex-wife Willadean Brogdon testified, "He said he lit the fuse." Michael Wayne Goings, a house painter who worked with Cherry in Dallas in 1982, said he also heard him boast about the crime, even saying "You know, I bombed that church."

A third man, Mitchell Burns, had been an associate of Blanton and Cherry at the time of the bombing and was recruited by Federal Bureau of Investigation investigators to act as an informant. Burns testified on the stand at Cherry's trial that Burns' involvement with the Ku Klux Klan was more socially than politically based, something that was plausible during the era of the crime, and that the agents approached him and asked for his help. He initially declined but was shown postmortem photos of the young girls killed by the bomb. Deeply disturbed by what he had seen, he vomited. He agreed to work with the Federal Bureau of Investigation.

Burns testified that he was primarily a friend of Blanton, but that Blanton was a good friend of Cherry, so Cherry would sometimes join them when they went out. Burns' assistance came in the form of going to numerous honky tonks with the two men with a very large reel-to-reel tape recorder in the car trunk recording the group's conversations. Burns took thorough notes after these meetings, and additionally when the three met and spoke outside of his car.

The tapes were collected by the Federal Bureau of Investigation during its immediate investigation. They were subsequently misplaced or archived and were rediscovered in 1997; the rediscovery of the tapes ultimately led to the prosecution of Blanton and Cherry.

The recordings primarily contained racist sentiment. Most significantly, one recording from the car raised the subject of the 16th Street Baptist Church bombing. In the recording, the men spoke of it with approval. Blanton began to say something that sounded as if he were about to implicate himself and Cherry by bragging, but Cherry, who was less acquainted with the informant, sharply cut him off by saying, "Now, this good ol' boy doesn't need to know about that!" and laughed. Burns also reported unrecorded references made by Blanton and Cherry to their involvement in the bombing.

=== Video ===
Also presented at Cherry's trial were videos showing explosives in the same quantity as had been used in the bombing being used to destroy a car in a field. The violent force of the explosion evident in the video was designed to counter the defense's suggestion that, though they claimed that Cherry was not involved, the purpose of the bomb may have been to scare the church congregants, not to kill or injure them.

Prosecutors also "showed the jury a videotape of a white mob beating local civil rights leader Fred Shuttlesworth when he showed up to register his children at the all white Phillips High School." At one point, the prosecutors "froze the film as a grinning, slender white man with a bulbous nose, wavy hair and a cigarette dangling from his mouth — unmistakably a grinning young Bobby Frank Cherry — was seen slamming his fist into the minister's head after pulling what appeared to be a set of brass knuckles from his back pocket."

== Conviction ==
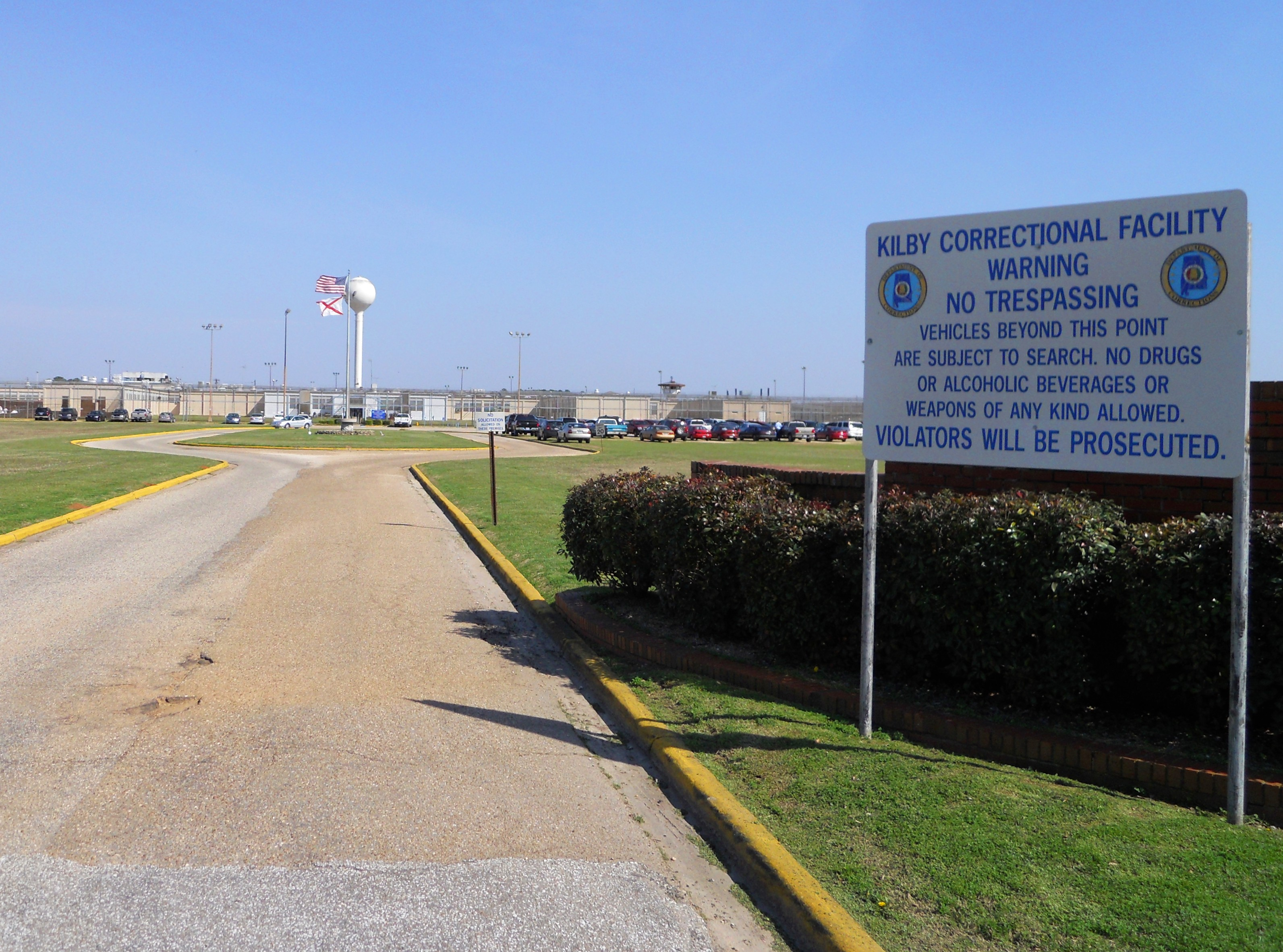
Kilby Correctional Facility, where Cherry was held for intake and where he died

During the trial, Cherry smiled and looked amused. He could be seen joking with his lawyers and several supporters, not appearing to believe that the legal system which had protected him up to that point would ultimately send him to jail. He was convicted on four counts of murder and sentenced to life in prison. Cherry attempted to appeal, but in October 2004, the Alabama Court of Criminal Appeals unanimously upheld his conviction. The court rejected Cherry's claim that a delay of 37 years between his commission of the crime and his indictment in 2000 had resulted in an inherently unfair trial.

During his prison sentence, Cherry repeatedly claimed to be the victim of a malicious false campaign against him and he said that he was a "political prisoner" who was denied proper treatment.

He was originally taken to the Kilby Correctional Facility in Montgomery County, Alabama, for intake. He was later moved to Holman Correctional Facility in Escambia County, Alabama.

On Wednesday October 13, 2004, Cherry was transferred from Holman Prison to Atmore Community Hospital in Atmore. During the same day, an ambulance transported him from the Atmore hospital to a hospital in Montgomery.

Cherry died in the Kilby prison's hospital unit, on November 18, 2004, at the age of 74. He is buried in Payne Springs Cemetery in Henderson County, Texas.

== Media portrayal ==
Cherry is portrayed by Richard Jenkins in the 2002 television film Sins of the Father.

== See also ==
- Robert Edward Chambliss
- Herman Frank Cash
- African-American history
- Civil rights movement
- Birmingham campaign
- Mass racial violence in the United States
