= Thomas Edwin Blanton Jr. =

American murderer (1938–2020)

- Undated mug shot of Blanton taken by the Alabama Department of Corrections
- Born: June 20, 1938; Washington, D.C., U.S.
- Died: June 26, 2020 (aged 82); William E. Donaldson Correctional Facility, Bessemer, Alabama, U.S.
- Known for: Participant in the 16th Street Baptist Church bombing
- Parent: Thomas Edwin "Pops" Blanton Sr.
- Status: Deceased
- Motive: White supremacy
- Conviction: First degree murder (4 counts)
- Penalty: Life imprisonment
- Accomplices: Robert Edward Chambliss; Bobby Frank Cherry

Thomas Edwin Blanton Jr. (June 20, 1938 – June 26, 2020) was an American domestic terrorist. He was sentenced to four life sentences for his role as conspirator in the 16th Street Baptist Church bombing in Birmingham, Alabama, on September 15, 1963, which killed four African American girls (Carole Robertson, Cynthia Wesley, Addie Mae Collins, and Denise McNair). Blanton, along with Bobby Frank Cherry, was convicted in May 2001 in a highly publicized trial of the cold case. Future United States Senator Doug Jones successfully prosecuted Blanton and Cherry.

== Early life ==
Blanton was born in Washington, D.C., on June 20, 1938, and was the son of Thomas Edwin "Pops" Blanton Sr., who was described in 2001 as a notorious racist in the Birmingham, Alabama, area.

== Education and career ==
Blanton had a tenth-grade education and served as an aircraft mechanic in the Navy from 1956 to 1959. Blanton was a member of the Ku Klux Klan in the early 1960s, along with the other suspects in the bombing.

== Trial and imprisonment ==
At the time of his arrest in 2000, Blanton was working at a Walmart store and lived in a trailer with no running water.

Blanton was a suspect from early in the investigation, but J. Edgar Hoover reportedly prevented attempts by the Birmingham office or the Federal Bureau of Investigation to bring charges against Blanton and three other men. This was reportedly because Hoover thought a successful prosecution was unlikely. In a jury trial in 2001, Blanton was prosecuted by the state, and convicted of murder. He was sentenced to four life sentences in state prison.

He was housed at Holman Correctional Facility in Atmore, Alabama. Blanton went before the parole board on August 3, 2016. Parole was denied and deferred until 2021.

== Death ==
On June 26, 2020, Blanton died at William E. Donaldson Correctional Facility after 19 years of incarceration, from unspecified causes while serving his life sentence, six days after his 82nd birthday.

== See also ==
- African-American history
- Civil rights movement
- Birmingham campaign
- Mass racial violence in the United States
