= Alabama Jazz Hall of Fame =

American organization and museum

Coordinates: 33°31′1.57″N 86°48′45.72″W

- The marquee
- Established: 1978
- Location: Birmingham's historic Carver Theatre
- Type: Jazz
- Collections: Paintings, quilts, instruments, and personal effects
- Website: http://www.jazzhall.com/

The Alabama Jazz Hall of Fame (AJHF) is an organization and museum in Birmingham, Alabama, United States. It was founded in 1978, and opened as museum on September 18, 1993, with a mission "to foster, encourage, educate, and cultivate a general appreciation of the medium of jazz music as a legitimate, original and distinctive art form indigenous to America. Its mission is also to preserve a continued and sustained program of illuminating the contribution of the State of Alabama through its citizens, environment, demographics and lore, and perpetuating the heritage of jazz music."

== The AJHoF Museum ==
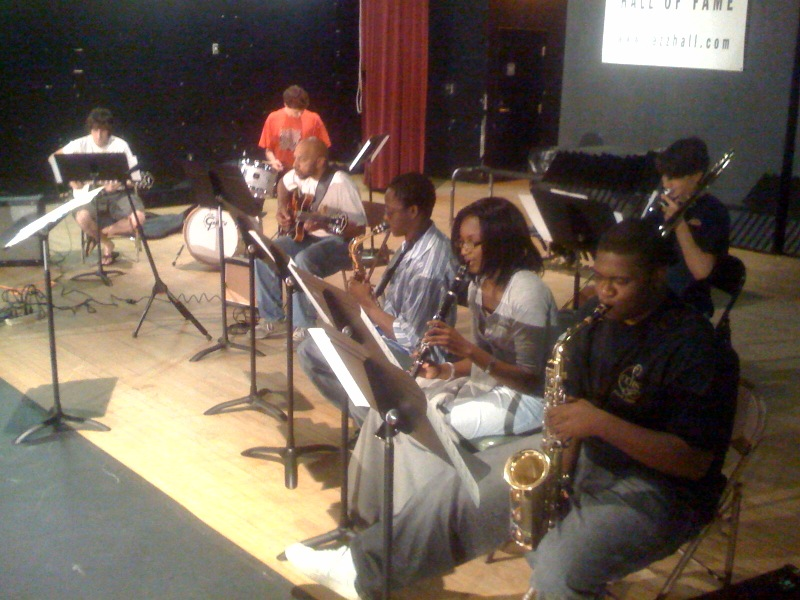
Members of the AJHF free Saturday jazz class.

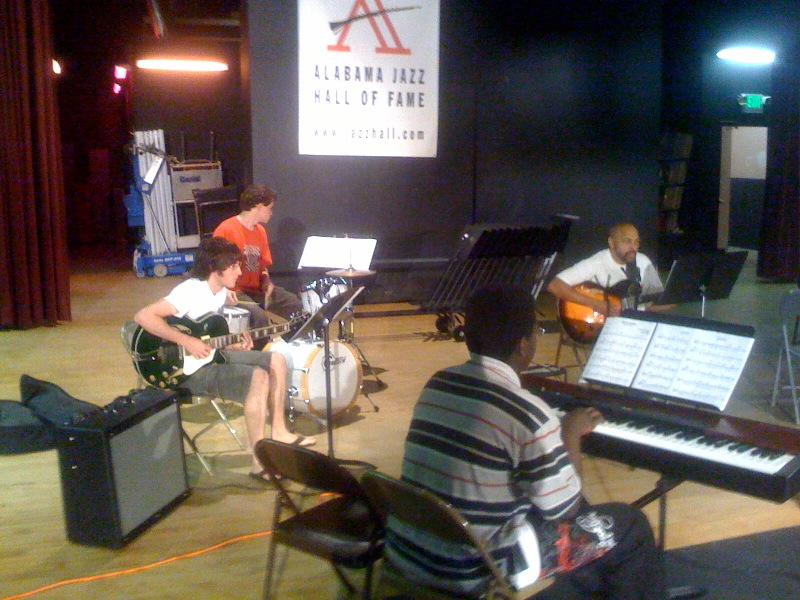
Members of the AJHF free Saturday jazz class.

The museum is located in Birmingham's historic Carver Theatre, which is part of the Birmingham Civil Rights District, along with the Birmingham Civil Rights Institute, 16th Street Baptist Church and Kelly Ingram Park. The museum contains more than 2,200 square feet (200 m^{2}) of exhibits. The Jazz Hall of Fame also sponsors jazz performances around the city and brings jazz to many local students with school visits from musicians. It contains memorabilia such as paintings, quilts, instruments, and personal effects of such artists as Ella Fitzgerald and W.C. Handy, and offers a tour guided by Frank Adams.

== Free Saturday jazz classes ==
Every Saturday morning since 1999, the Alabama Jazz Hall of Fame has offered free jazz classes to any resident of the state of Alabama. Founded by Dr. Frank Adams, the classes are taught by local jazz band directors from area schools. In these classes, students learn to read and improvise jazz. Graduates of the AJHF classes have received scholarships to prestigious jazz studies programs, such as the ones offered by the University of New Orleans, the Manhattan School of Music and New School University in New York City.

== AJHF Annual Student Jazz Band Festival ==
Every year, the Alabama Jazz Hall of Fame invites middle school, high school and college jazz bands to perform in this annual three-day event. Bands are adjudicated by notable jazz authorities and awards for "Band of Distinction" and "Outstanding Soloist" are made in each of the categories: Middle School, High School, Junior College and College.

Past award recipients at the AJHF Student Jazz Band Festival

=== College and University Bands of Distinction ===
- 2004 - University of Alabama Jazz Ensemble A, "College Band of Distinction" - Tom Wolfe, Director
- 2005 - University of Alabama at Birmingham, UAB Jazz Ensemble, "College Band of Distinction" - Ray Reach, Director
- 2006 - Jacksonville State University Jazz Ensemble, "College Band of Distinction" - Chip Crotts, Director
- 2007 - Troy State University, "College Band of Distinction"
- 2008 - Jackson State University, Jackson Mississippi, "College Band of Distinction"
- 2009 - Troy State University, "College Band of Distinction"
- 2012 - University of Alabama at Birmingham,"College Band of Distinction" - Steven Roberts, Director
- 2014 - University of Alabama at Birmingham,"College Band of Distinction" - Steven Roberts, Director
- 2015 - University of Alabama at Birmingham,"College Band of Distinction" - Steven Roberts, Director
- 2016 - University of Alabama at Birmingham "College Band of Distinction" - Steven Roberts, Director
- 2017 - Alabama State University, "College Band of Distinction" - Isaac Bell Jr., Director
- 2018 - Troy University, "College Band of Distinction" - Dr. Dave Camwell, Director

=== College and University Outstanding Soloists ===
- 2004 - Omari Thomas, University of Alabama at Birmingham, "Outstanding College Soloist"
- 2005 - Omari Thomas, University of Alabama at Birmingham, "Outstanding College Soloist"
- 2014 - Kameron Dickerson, "Outstanding College Soloist"
- 2015 - Alex Garrett, University of Alabama, Tuscaloosa, "Outstanding College Soloist"

=== High School Bands of Distinction ===
- 2015 - Minor High School, "High School Band of Distinction" - James Crumb, Director
- 2016 - Alabama School of Fine Arts, "High School Band of Distinction" - Dr. Robert Janssen, Director
- 2017 - Oak Mountain High School, "High School Band of Distinction" - Kevin Ownby, Director
- 2018 - Minor High School, "High School Band of Distinction" - James Crumb, Director

=== High School Outstanding Soloists ===
- 2015 Matthew Belser, Alabama School of Fine Arts, "Outstanding High School Soloist"

=== Middle School Bands of Distinction ===
- 2015 Phillips Academy, Joseph Smith III, Director

=== Middle School Outstanding Soloists ===
- 2015 Jaeden Henderson, Phillips Academy, "Outstanding Middle School Soloists"

== Spin-offs from AJHoF educational programs ==
There are a number of "spin-off" groups spawned by the educational programs at the Alabama Jazz Hall of Fame. Among these is a group called the "Neo Jazz Collective." A group of young students, exhibiting the skills they learned at the Alabama Jazz Hall of Fame, created this ensemble, with the intention of becoming a professional entity. The group is directed by Lud Yisrael. The group started their own school in Fairfield, Alabama, and is fast becoming a popular "Nu-Jazz" ensemble in the Birmingham area.

== Annual "Taste of 4th Avenue" Jazz Festival ==
During the fall of each year, the "Taste of 4th Avenue Jazz Festival" takes place, jointly sponsored by the Alabama Jazz Hall of Fame and Urban Impact of Birmingham.

== Free jazz workshops, clinics and masterclasses ==
AJHF offers free jazz workshops, clinics and masterclasses. Past guest clinicians include Lou Marini (saxophonist), Eric Marienthal (saxophonist), Bill Goodwin (drummer), T. S. Monk (drummer), and Gregg Karukas (keyboardist), Joey Alexander (pianist), and Esperanza Spalding.

== Musical instrument recycling program ==
Every year, the Alabama Jazz Hall of Fame accepts contributions of used, but repairable, instruments. Numerous instruments have been donated, many by famous musicians such as Lou Marini, Erskine Hawkins, Sammy Lowe and Haywood Henry. These recycled instruments are put to use by students of the AJHF educational programs.

== List of inductees ==
- 1978: Frank Adams, Amos Gordon, Erskine Hawkins, Haywood Henry, Sammy Lowe, John Tuggle "Fess" Whatley
- 1979: Paul Bascomb, Dud Bascomb, John Bell, Jothan Callins, Charles H. Clarke, Cleveland Eaton, Johnny Grimes, Richard "Dickie" Harris, Jo Jones, James H. Mitchell, Avery Parrish, Sun Ra, John C. Reed, Laura Washington
- 1980: Walter Blythe, Babe Clarke, Peter F. Clarke, Jimmy Colvin, Charles Daniels, Wilson Driver, Jerry Grundhoefer, Calvin Ivory, Henry Kimbrell, Jesse Larkins, Shorty Long, Rushton Miller, Walter Miller, Fletcher Myatt, C. Julian Parrish, Hampton Reese, Alwilda Smith, John S. Springer Sr., Newman C. Terrell, Iva B. Williams
- 1981: John Anderson, Henry Blankenship, Melvin H. Caswell, Richard Clarke, Victor Cunningham, Murray Harper, Jimmie Harris, Theodore Hill, George Hudson, William Johnson III, Warren Parham, Avery Richardson, Richard Sanford, E. W. Williams, Ivory Williams.
- 1982: Joe Alexander, Esau Coleman, Alton Davenport, Joseph Guy, Leon Hines, George Hudson, Lovell Litton, James Powell, Sam Ranelli, Tolton Rosser, Joseph Sanford, John Santoro, Roszetta Johnson, William Stewart, Robert Summers
- 1983: Hooper T. Abrams, Leroy Allen, Leatha Bell, Frank Carpenter, Paul B. Coman, LaVergne Comer, Dolly Brown Gibson, Marcellus Green, Frank Greer, Monroe Kennedy, Robert McCoy, Neil McLean, Bull Simpson, Jesse Taylor
- 1984: Doris Adams, Carl Atkins, Lucius Daniels, Ella Fitzgerald, Shelton Gary, James McDaniels, Robert Moore, H. T. Raleigh Randolph, Johnny Smith, Arthur Stringer, Sam Taylor
- 1985: Bo Berry, Edward A. Brown, Henry Caffey, Andrew Fair, Howard Funderburg, W. C. Handy, Jerome Hopkins, Everett Lawler, James Lowe, Willie Richardson, Lee Stanfield, Jonny Williams (Honorary inductees: Richard Arrington Jr., Gloria Curry, J. Garrick Hardy, C. W. Hayes, David Vann, Lewis White)
- 1986: Lucky Davis, Henry Glover, Hortense Henderson, Thomas Lyle, Mary Alice Marable, Jack Marshall, Ellis McClure, Lucky Millinder, Jerry Reed, Dinah Washington, H. T. Ward, Zelpha Wells, Harry Young
- 1987: Guitar Allen, Donald Crawford, Jesse Dandy, Ted Galloway, Jerry Greene, Tommie Harris, Aldolphus Williams
- 1988: Horace Carney, Roosevelt Hatcher, Attorney James Henderson, Nathaniel Miller, Bobby Owens, Rose Marie Rushin, Bonna Mae Perine Samuels, Tommy Stewart
- 1989: Emerson Able, John Carlton, Eddie Castleberry, Samuel Fisher, John McAphee Jr, Henry Pugh, J. B. Sims, Cornelius Aikens
- 1990: James Reese Europe, Joseph Giattina, William W. Handy, J. Earl Hensley, Nuncie LeBerte, William Lee, Irene Monroe, William Nappi, Jimmy Randolph, Evelyn Wallace
- 1991: Pat Cather, Andre Ford, Ann Graham, Eric Essix, Alex Gulas, Wilbur Harden, Cliff Nation, DeWitt Shaw, Pinetop Smith, James Swyne, Cootie Williams
- 1992: Earlie Billups, Duke Ellington, Lionel Hampton, Trenton Harris, Samuel Lay, Consuela Lee Moorehead
- 1993: Nat King Cole, John Collins
- 1994: Cholly Atkins, Mary Ogletree, Willie Ruff
- 1995: Jim Bell, Countess Felder, Urbie Green, Henry Panion, Hassan Ralph Williams, Bobby Smith
- 1997: Victor Atkins, Jesse Champion, Foxxy Fatts, Thomas Lindsey, Johnny O'Neal
- 2001: Rickey Powell, Charles Ard
- 2008: Gene Conners (aka “The Mighty Flea”), Frank Davis Jr, Bart Grooms, Alvon A. “Sonny” Harris, Grover Mitchell, Steve Sample Sr, Harry Noble Simms, Roy Yarbrough
- 2013: Harry Belafonte
- 2015: Mart Avant, Rick Bell, Daniel Jose Carr, Marion Evans, John Hayden, Robert Horton, Don Jones, Hal Kemp, Al Killian, Jean Kittrell, Jack Marshall, Gary Motley, Phelton Simmons, Eb Swingle, Ward Swingle, George Washington and Fred Wesley Jr.
- 2024: Ron Carter

== See also ==
- List of music museums
- List of jazz institutions and organizations
