= Tommy Stewart (trumpeter) =

American trumpeter, arranger, and composer

- Tommy Stewart

Background information
- Born: November 19, 1939 (age 86); Gadsden, Alabama, U.S.
- Genres: Disco, funk, R&B
- Occupations: Musician, arranger, record producer
- Instrument: Trumpet
- Years active: 1956–present
- Website: tommystewartmusic.com

Tommy Stewart is an American trumpeter, arranger, composer, and record producer. He has been a member of the Magic City Jazz Orchestra, Cleveland Eaton and the Alabama All-Stars, the Alabama Jazz Hall of Fame All-Stars, and Ray Reach and Friends. He was a 1988 inductee into the Alabama Jazz Hall of Fame.

== Early years ==
John T. "Fess" Whatley trained Stewart, Erskine Hawkins, Dud Bascomb, Paul Bascomb, and Sun Ra (previously known as Herman Blount). Whatley taught music at Industrial High in Birmingham, which at the time was one of the largest populated high schools in America, with more than 3,500 students walking its hallways. Alvin "Stumpy" Robinson, the band director at Washington Jr High School, was also influential in Stewart's development.

Tommy Stewart enrolled at Alabama State College without knowing how he was going to pay tuition. The problem solved itself when he joined the Bama State Collegians, a dance band formed in 1929 who at various times featured Erskine Hawkins, Avery Parrish, Joe Newman, Sam Taylor, Julian Dash, Benny Powell, and Vernall Fournier. Other musicians who attended Alabama State are Clarence Carter, Fred Wesley (James Brown), and Walter Orange (Commodores). The popular band made enough money to fund Stewart's way through four years of college.

== Education ==
He attended Alabama State University, where he directed the Bama State Collegians (formerly directed by trumpeter Erskine Hawkins). Later, he studied jazz arranging at the Eastman School of Music. Stewart also studied arranging under John Duncan, a classical composer and teacher at Alabama State University. Tommy pledged Omega Psi Phi at the Gamma Sigma chapter located on the Alabama State University Campus.

== Teaching years ==
He taught high school from 1961 to 1963 at Fayette High School in St. Clair County Alabama. In 1969 he moved to Atlanta, Georgia, and taught in Fayetteville, Ga; he also worked for Morris Brown College doing band arrangements. He taught jazz and did band arrangements at Morehouse College from 1974 to 1985. He also taught band classes at West End High School in Birmingham, Alabama from 1991-2001. He also taught "A Survey of Popular Music" at Georgia State University in 1979.

From 2005 to 2007, Tommy served as a faculty member of the educational program at the Alabama Jazz Hall of Fame, under Director of Student Jazz Programs, Ray Reach. In this position, he was also a member of the Alabama Jazz Hall of Fame All-Stars.

== Music career ==
In 1956 he played with Roy Hamilton. In 1963 Stewart performed with Willie Hightower L.C. Cook, and Junior Parker during summer vacations. He arranged music for Eula Cooper, The Mighty Hannibal, Sandy Gaye, and Langston-French Duo (Langston is an ex-Pip and Gladys Knight's cousin). Most of these arranging assignments took place on Jessie Jones's label, Tragar Records.

During the 1970s, he worked at the Gold Lounge accompanying Gladys Knight & the Pips and The Tams. In 1971 he went on the road with Johnnie Taylor's show, which included Jackie Moore, King Floyd, Z. Z. Hill, and The Stylistics, who were popular because of the song "You're a Big Girl Now." He was the chief arranger for a television show in 1972 called Nightlife South which ran for 25 weeks. In 1973 he wrote charts for The Burning of Atlanta album by The Spirit of Atlanta for Buddah Records. Working for GRC/Aware Records, he arranged songs for John Edwards (who later joined The Spinners) and Loletta Holloway.

Stewart toured as musical director with Johnnie Taylor on his Disco Lady Tour in 1976 and also served as Ted Taylor's musical director. In 1973 he directed Taylor's band while they performed on The Midnight Special with host Wolfman Jack. In the late 1970s Stewart collaborated with Marlon McNichols, a producer from Detroit, Michigan, to record disco with Final Approach, Cream De CoCo, Tamiko Jones, Moses Davis, and Stewart's album, which included the song "Bump & Hustle Music". Stewart arranged for Luther Ingram in 1977 and Johnny Baylor (Ingram was manager and owner of KoKo Records).

He released his debut album, Tommy Stewart for Abraxas in 1976. Rick Anderson at AllMusic said about the album, "It's almost impossible to keep a straight face while listening to this album...It's a document of one of pop music's most simultaneously embarrassing and glorious periods—the High Disco Era—when all pretense of lyrical sophistication was abandoned in favor of occasional interjections of 'Hey! Get down! Get off your seats and jam!' (a direct quote from this album)".

Stewart produced Martha High's solo album for Salsoul and co-wrote most of the songs. It was around this time that he produced Ripple, a band who recorded the song "The Beat Goes On," and Southside Coalition, made up of some of Stewart's former students from Archer High School in Atlanta.

He worked with Major Lance on two albums, toured with the Tams in 1983, and did arrangements for Serena Johnson's album The Lack of Communication. In 1990, he co-founded the African American Philharmonic Orchestra with founder and conductor John Peek. He moved from Atlanta to Birmingham in 1992.

== Discography ==
- Tommy Stewart – Same (Abraxas, 1976)
- Tommy Stewart and His Orchestra (Circle, 1980)
- Sil Austin + Tommy Stewart and His Orchestra (Circle, 1981)
- Tommy Stewart – Disco Love Affair (Cultures of Soul, 2012)
- The Spirit of Atlanta – The Burning of Atlanta (Buddah, 1973)
- Whole Darn Family – Has Arrived (Soul International, 1976)
- Ripple – Sons of the Gods (Salsoul, 1977)
- Luther Ingram – (KoKo,1977)
- Stevo – Musica Negra (Oliva Cantu, 1978)
- Opus 7 – Opus 7 (MCA, 1978)
- Ojeda Penn – Happiness (IFE, 1980)
- Hambone – Big Fat Juicy Fun (Salsoul, 1981)
- Solar Source – Now's the Time (AVI, 1981)
- Major Lance – I Wanna Go Home (Columbia, 1981)

12":

- Tommy Stewart - Bump & Hustle Music (unreleased 11 minute version bootleg) (G.B. Music 12" 2004)
- Stevo - Pay The Price / Party Night (G-K Productions 12")
- Stevo - Pay The Price / Party Night (T.K. Disco 12")
- Gregory Jolly - I Want To Clap My Hands For The Power / What' Em Doing Is My Business (G-K Productions 12")
- Masheen - Time / Get Up & Get Down (G-K Productions 12")
- Papa Gotta Live – Disco Harp / Music Man (G-K Productions 12")
- Sil Austin – Disco Music / Disco Lady (Jerri 7")
- Moses - Love to live / Something about you (Pure Silk 12" 1978)
- Mad Dog Fire Department - Cosmic Funk (T.K. Disco 12" 1979)
- Sherman Hunter - Dancing Down The Avenue (T.K. Disco 12" 1979)
- Sherman Hunter - Dance To Freedom (Dealers Choice 12" 1981)
- Cream de Coco - Wiggle wiggle wiggle / Disco strut (Free Spirit 12" 1976)
- Final Approach - We Like To Boogie / Que Passa (Goldplate 12" 1976)
- Tamiko Jones - Let It Flow (T.K. Disco 12" 1976)
- Martha High - He's My Ding Dong Man / Wallflower (Salsoul 12" 1979)
- Martha High - Showdown / He's My Ding Dong Man (Salsoul 12" 1979)
- Reanna Coleman – You're In My Pocket (Konduko 12" 1984)

45:

- Terry and Deep South – Trying to Get By (Bama 7" 1976)
- Clinton Harmon – I Want to Get Close to You (Note Records 7" 1976)
- Clinton Harmon – Can't Help the Way I Feel About You (Barnstorm Records 7")
- Stev–O – Easter Parade / Disco Bunny (G.K. Disco Series 7")
- Stevo – Pay the Price / Party Night (Shield 7")
- Lyn Westbrook – African Strut Part1 / African Strut Part2 (Esprit 7")
- Funny Bone – Ride on Bones / Bring It Home (Camp–Bell 7")
- Eula Cooper – I Can't Help If I Love You / Since I Fell for You (Tragar 7" 1969)
- Sandy Gaye – Watch the Dog That Bring the Bone / Talk Is Cheap (Tragar 7" 1969)
- Sandy Gaye – He's Good for Me / Talk Is Cheap (Moonshot 7" 1969)
- Richard Cook – Love is So Mean / Somebody's Got to Help Me (Tragar 7" 1969)
- Langston and French – Let's Get Funky / Tumbling Down (Tragar 7" 1969)
- Nathan Wilkes – Now that I Am Wise / Strange Feeling (Tragar 7" 1969)
- Richard Marks – Home for the Holidays / Mr. Santa Claus (Tuska 7" 1969)
- Buddy Cantrell – Why Did You Leave Me? / You Ain't No Good (Tuska 7" 1969)
- Richard Marks – I'm the Man for You / Cracker Jack (Tuska 7" 1969)
- Barbara Hall – Broken Hearted / Big Man (Tuska 7" 1969)
- Richard Marks – Did You Ever Lose Something / Never Satisfied (Tuska 7" 1969)
- Loleatta Holloway – Cry to Me (Aware 7" 1974)
- Loleatta Holloway – H-E-L-P Me, My Lord (Aware 7" 1974)
- Loleatta Holloway – I Know Where You're Coming From / Show Must Go On (Aware 7" 1974)
- Loleatta Holloway – Casanova (Aware 7" 1974)
- Loleatta Holloway – Casanova / Only a Fool (Aware 7" 1975)
- Calvin Arnold – Friendly Neighborhood Freak (IX Chains 7" 1975)
- 3rd World Band – Disco Hop / Let's Boogie at the Disco (Abraxas 7" 1975)
- Sil Austin – Disco Lady / Disco Music (Jerri 7" 1976)
- South Side Coalition – Get Down Get Down / The Power–Play (Brown Dog 7" 1976)
- Ojeda Penn – Brotherson (IFE 7" 1981)
- Miss Louistine – Tired of Being Alone / I Don't Want to Love Nobody But You (NWE 7" 1984)
- Louistine – Self Serve Woman / Don't Take Me On (Plexus 7" 1984)
- Harold Daniels – Don't Snatch It Back / Instrumental (Southern Tracks / 1986)
