= Birmingham Civil Rights National Monument =

- U.S. Historic district – Contributing property
- U.S. National Monument
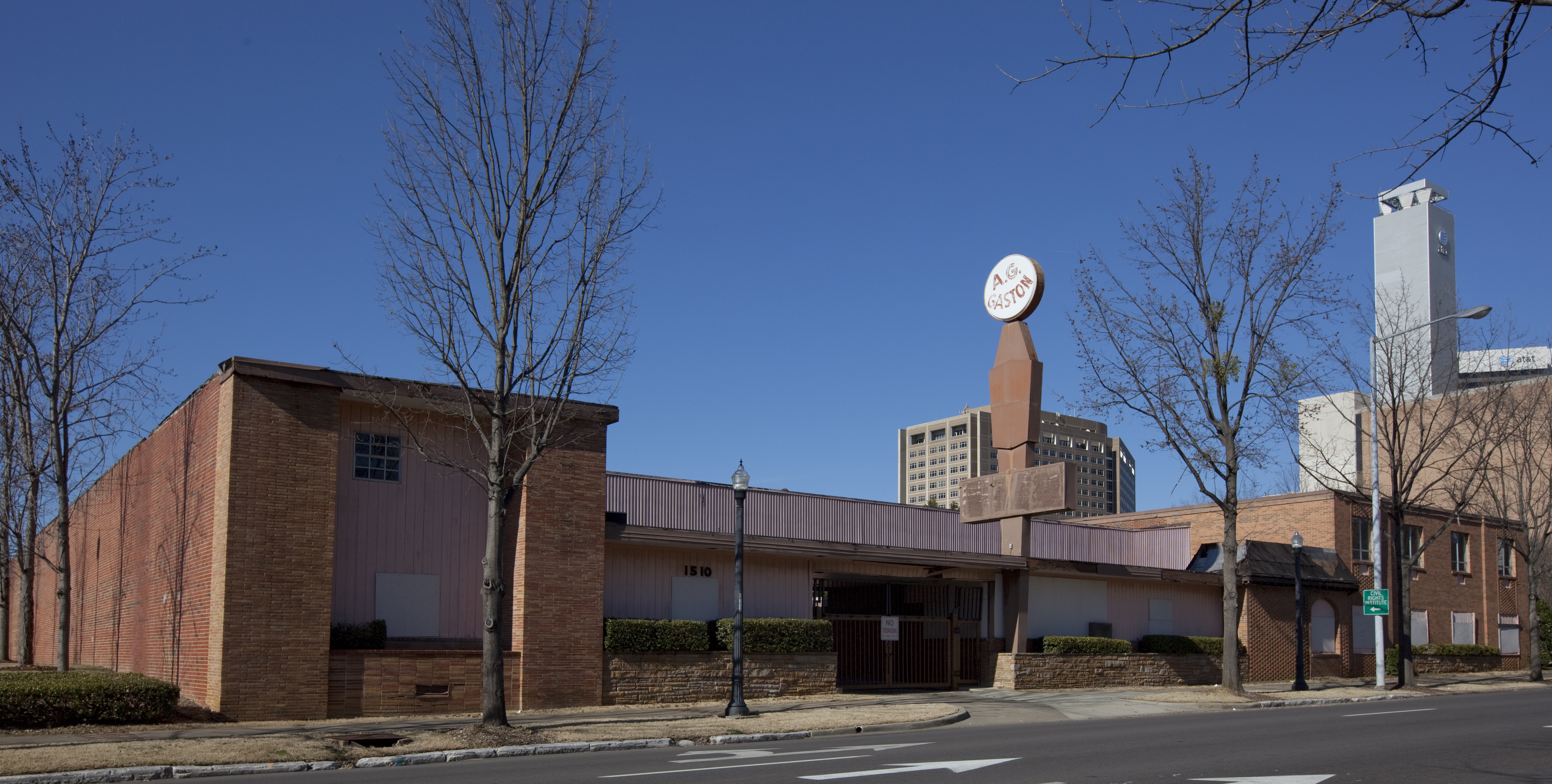
- The A.G. Gaston Motel is included in the monument.
- Interactive map of Birmingham Civil Rights National Monument
- Location: Birmingham, Alabama, United States
- Area: 18.25 acres (7.39 ha)
- Website: Birmingham Civil Rights National Monument
- Part of: Birmingham Civil Rights District (ID06000940)
- Designated NMON: January 12, 2017

The Birmingham Civil Rights National Monument is a United States National Monument in Birmingham, Alabama established in 2017 to preserve and commemorate the work of the 1963 Birmingham campaign, its Children's Crusade, and other Civil Rights Movement events and actions. Civil rights protesters took to the streets of Birmingham, Alabama to fight in favor of Project C, a campaign against laws limiting African Americans freedoms. They were met with violent resistance from the police. The monument spans an approximately five-block area of 18.25 acres (7.39 ha) in the Birmingham Civil Rights District near Downtown Birmingham. It is administered by the National Park Service.

== History ==
Birmingham was the site of the 1963 Birmingham campaign; Martin Luther King's Letter from Birmingham Jail; the Children's Crusade, with its images of students being attacked by water hoses and dogs; the bombing of the A.G. Gaston Motel – the movement's headquarters motel – and the 16th Street Baptist Church bombing.

President Barack Obama signed a proclamation on January 12, 2017, which designated half of the 36-acre (15 ha) Birmingham Civil Rights District as a U.S. National Monument. The purpose of this proclamation was to protect the history that came from the Reconstruction, tell stories, and illustrate how the Era redefined freedom. Other proclamations signed the same day established the Freedom Riders National Monument in Anniston and the Reconstruction Era National Monument in Beaufort County, South Carolina.

== Scope ==
The national monument is within the larger Birmingham Civil Rights District, which was designated in 1992 by the City of Birmingham. The National Park Service only has ownership in the A.G. Gaston Motel (0.88 acres (0.36 ha)), which now hosts the visitor center. Additional historic sites within the monument boundaries that partner with the NPS include the 16th Street Baptist Church, Kelly Ingram Park, St. Paul United Methodist Church, the Masonic Temple Building, and the Birmingham Civil Rights Institute. The historic Bethel Baptist Church in Birmingham's Collegeville neighborhood also partners with the monument but it outside the boundary.

== See also ==
- Fourth Avenue Historic District
- Freedom Riders National Monument
- Medgar and Myrlie Evers Home National Monument
- Civil rights movement in popular culture
- National Register of Historic Places listings in Birmingham, Alabama
- List of national monuments of the United States
