= Bama State Collegians =

American student jazz orchestra in Montgomery, Alabama, U.S.

- Origin: Montgomery, Alabama, U.S.
- Genre: Jazz
- Years active: late 1920s – 1963
- Past members: Len Bowden; Fess Whatley; Paul Bascomb; Erskine Hawkins; Haywood Henry; Joe Newman; Julian Dash; Sam "The Man" Taylor; Benny Powell; Avery Parrish; Tommy Stewart
- Organization: Alabama State University

The Bama State Collegians was a jazz orchestra made up of students at Alabama State University. It was organized in the late 1920s by Len Bowden, Fess Whatley, and Paul Bascomb. Len Bowden (1899–1989) went on to direct the U.S. Navy's music program at Camp Robert Smalls during World War II. John Tuggle "Fess" Whatley (1895–1972) was inducted into the Alabama Music Hall of Fame and has a K–8 school in Birmingham named after him.

The Bama State Collegians have been directed by a number of notable musicians, including Tommy Stewart and Erskine Hawkins.

The group also holds an important place in jazz history. In 1934, the entire group traveled to New York and became the Erskine Hawkins Orchestra, recording hit records such as "Tuxedo Junction", which rose to No. 7 nationally by Erskine Hawkins and No. 1 by Glenn Miller. Members of this band worked with the NBC Orchestra, the Lucky Millinder Orchestra, the Duke Ellington Orchestra, Louis Armstrong, and others.

Among those who have played with the orchestra are Dud Bascomb, Paul Bascomb, Avery Parrish, and Haywood Henry.

In 2011, the story of Erskine Hawkins and his start in the Bama State Collegians was the subject of a Florida State University Film School MFA Thesis Film "The Collegians", written and directed by Alabama State University alumnus Bryan Lewis.
