= Carver Theatre (Birmingham, Alabama) =

Theater in Birmingham, Alabama, US

Coordinates: 33.514888°N 86.811849°W

Carver Theatre

The Carver Theatre, now formally known as the Carver Performing Arts Center, is a theater located in downtown Birmingham, Alabama. In its days as a motion picture theater, it was best known as a place where African-Americans could see first-run movies; during that time, only whites were allowed in most theaters because of segregation laws.

The Carver is now a live performance venue which seats 527, and is also the home of the Alabama Jazz Hall of Fame.

== History ==
Located on the corner of Fourth Avenue North and 17th Street North, the Carver was opened in 1935. A 1945 renovation equipped the Carver with many new features, including 1,300 of the latest model theater chairs, air conditioning, and improved sound and projection, as reported by The Birmingham News. The Fourth Avenue area was a business and entertainment hub for the city's black community, and was also the location of many events in the Civil Rights Movement.

As with most downtown theaters, the Carver's fortunes declined over the years. In later years, the theater showed porn and the facility closed sometime in the early 1980s.

The City of Birmingham, seeking to improve the area where many events of the Civil Rights Movement took place, purchased the Carver in 1990 and remodeled it for live performance use, with an eye toward remembering the Carver's place in the African-American Community. One of the planned uses was a home for the Alabama Jazz Hall of Fame. Since its reopening, the Carver has hosted many events such as the Taste of 4th Avenue Jazz Festival, and the annual AJHoF Student Jazz Festival, as well as performances by Duke Ellington Orchestra, Lionel Hampton, Diana Krall, Lou Marini, the Magic City Jazz Orchestra, Ray Reach and the Alabama Jazz Hall of Fame All-Stars, Gregg Karukas, the Tom Joyner syndicated radio show, and many other notable performers. The Carver also hosts touring theatrical productions and numerous concerts and educational events sponsored by the Alabama Jazz Hall of Fame. The theatre is now a part of the Birmingham Civil Rights District.

== See also ==
- List of jazz venues
- List of jazz institutions and organizations
