= Birmingham Civil Rights District =

- Birmingham Civil Rights Historic District
- U.S. National Register of Historic Places
- U.S. Historic district
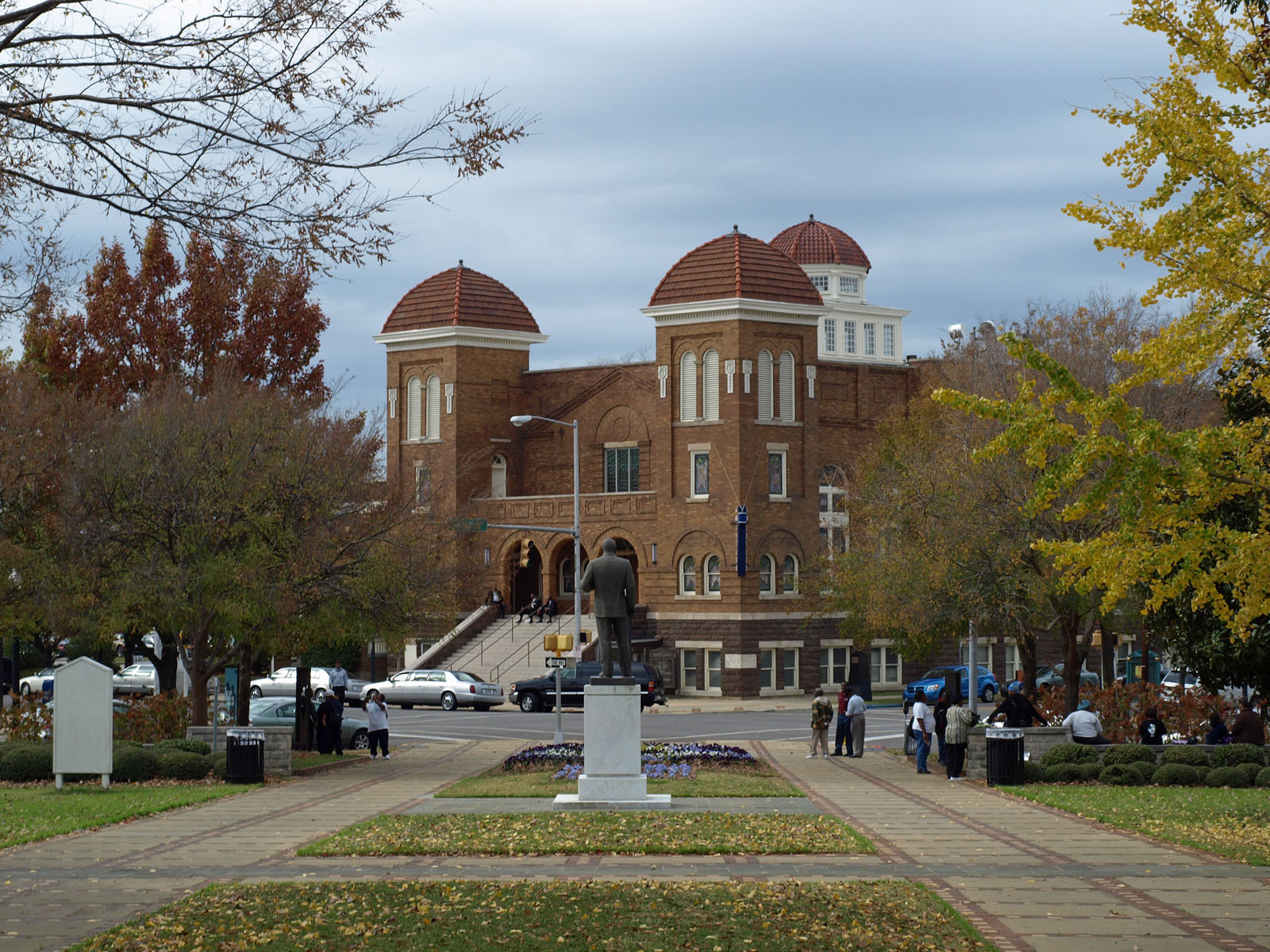
- 16th Street Baptist Church, as seen from Kelly Ingram Park. A statue of Martin Luther King Jr. faces the church.

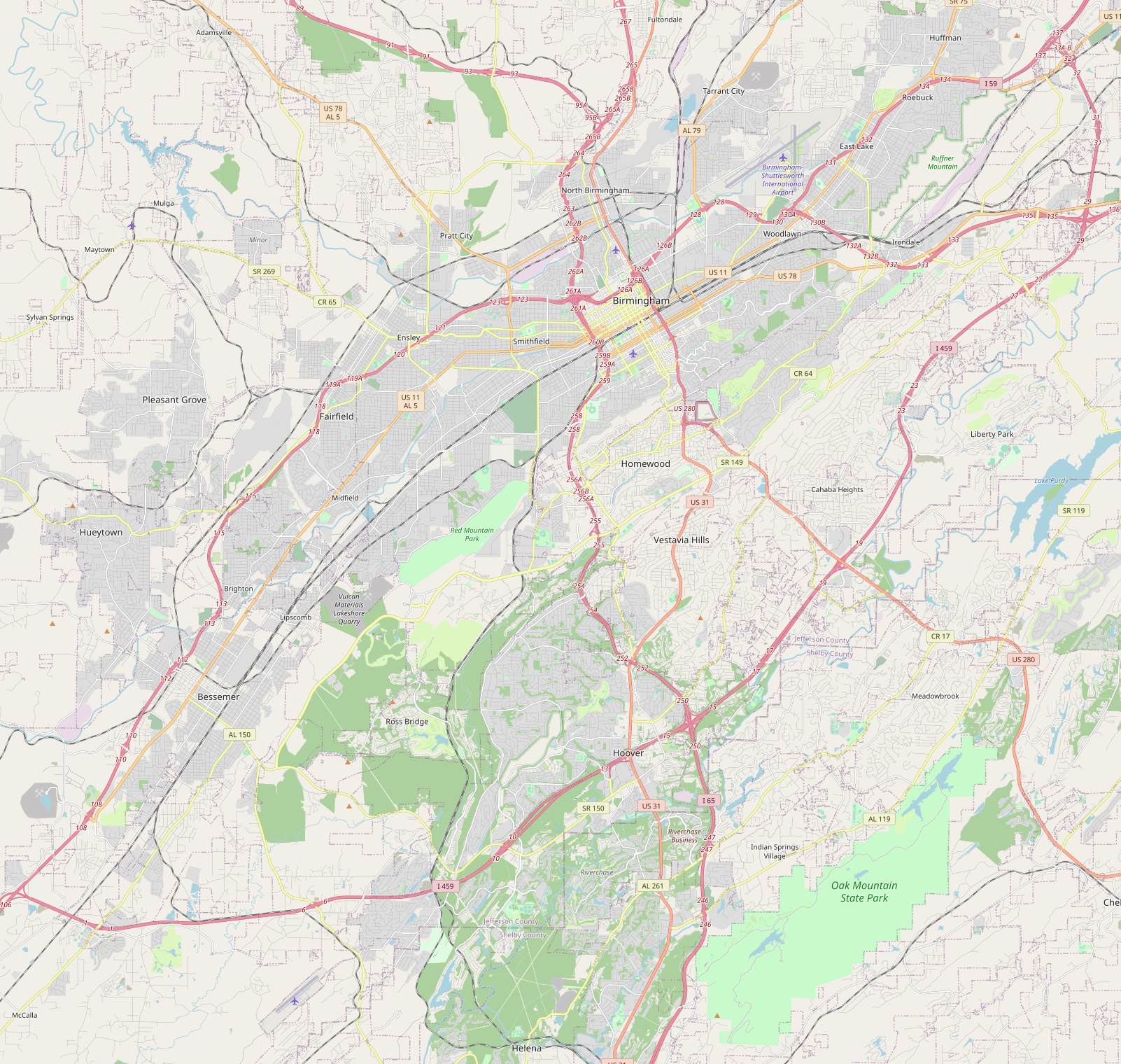
- Location within Birmingham, Alabama Location within Alabama Location within the United States
- Location: Roughly bounded 9th Ave., Richard Arrington Jr. Blvd., 1st Ave. and 14th St., Birmingham, Alabama
- Coordinates: 33°30′58″N 86°48′54″W
- Area: 36 acres (15 ha)
- Built: 1963
- Architect: Turner, Smith & Baston; et al.
- Architectural style: Classical Revival, Gothic Revival
- MPS: Civil Rights Movement in Birmingham, Alabama MPS
- NRHP reference No.: 06000940
- Added to NRHP: October 19, 2006

The Birmingham Civil Rights District is an area of downtown Birmingham, Alabama where several significant events in the Civil Rights Movement of the 1950s and 1960s took place. The district was designated by the City of Birmingham in 1992 and covers a six-block area.

Landmarks in the district include:

- 16th Street Baptist Church, where the students involved in the 1963 Birmingham campaign and its Children's Crusade were trained by SCLC activist James Bevel and left in groups of 50 to march on City Hall, and where four young African American girls were killed and 22 churchgoers were injured in a bombing on September 15, 1963.
- Kelly Ingram Park, where many protests by blacks were held, often resulting in recrimination by Birmingham police, including the famous 1963 scenes of policemen turning back young protesters with fire hoses and police dogs. News coverage of the police attack in this park helped turn the tide of public opinion in the United States against legalized segregationist policies. Several sculptures in the park depict scenes from those police riots.
- The Fourth Avenue Business District, where much of the city's black businesses and entertainment venues were located; the area was the hub of the black community for many years. The business district includes A. G. Gaston's Booker T. Washington Insurance Co. and the Gaston Motel, a meeting place for the Southern Christian Leadership Conference and Alabama Christian Movement for Human Rights during the early 1960s.
- Carver Theatre, once a popular motion picture theater for blacks in Birmingham, now renovated as a live-performance theater and home of the Alabama Jazz Hall of Fame.
- Birmingham Civil Rights Institute, a museum which chronicles the events, actions, and victories of the Civil Rights Movement, opened in 1993.

On March 21, 2016, Rep. Terri Sewell introduced to the United States House of Representatives H.R. 4817, a bill that would designate the Birmingham Civil Rights District as a National Historical Park. On March 28, 2016, the bill was referred to the Subcommittee on Federal Lands. However, a portion of the district was designated by executive order by President Obama as the Birmingham Civil Rights National Monument on January 12, 2017.

== See also ==
- Timeline of the civil rights movement
- Birmingham Civil Rights Institute
- Birmingham Civil Rights National Monument
- List of national monuments of the United States
