= A. H. Parker High School =

Public high school in Birmingham, Alabama

A.H. Parker High School

Location
- 900 4th Street North; Birmingham, Alabama 35204; United States; 33°30′53″N 86°49′45″W

Information
- School type: Public
- Established: 1900 (126 years ago)
- School district: Birmingham City Schools
- CEEB code: 010395
- Principal: Darrell Hudson
- Teaching staff: 41.00 (FTE)
- Grades: 9-12
- Enrollment: 854 (2023-2024)
- Student to teacher ratio: 20.83
- Colors: Purple and white
- Nickname: Thundering Herd
- Website: www.bhamcityschools.org/o/aes

Alabama Register of Landmarks and Heritage
- Designated: May 19, 2011

A.H. Parker High School is a four-year public high school in Birmingham, Alabama.

It is one of seven high schools in the Birmingham City School System and is named for longtime Birmingham educator Arthur Harold Parker. School colors are purple and white, and the mascot is the Bison (the 'Thundering Herd'). Parker competes in AHSAA Class 6A athletics.

== History ==
Originally known as Negro High School, Parker opened as a high school for African-American children in the fall of 1900 with a freshman class of 19 students and one teacher. The school's first graduation was June 3, 1904, at the 16th Street Baptist Church, where 15 students received diplomas. Its founding was spearheaded by pastor and banker William R. Pettiford, and Arthur H. Parker was its first principal.

In September 1910 the school moved to a temporary location - the Lane Auditorium - and began offering skills for women such as sewing, knitting, and child care. By that time the enrollment was about 100 students. Construction of a permanent facility began in 1923, and by 1929 the school had an industrial building, a library and a gymnasium.

In 1937 the school had an enrollment of over 2,700, and in 1939, A.H. Parker retired as principal and the school was subsequently renamed in his honor.

The school continued to grow steadily to 3,761 students in 1946. Because of that large number, the school soon became known as the largest high school for Negroes in the world. In 1953, the school was accredited by the Southern Association of Colleges and Schools, an accreditation it has kept ever since.

In February 2007 the Birmingham City Board of Education announced that Parker would be one of the schools rebuilt using the city's $331 million share of the $1.1 billion Jefferson County School Construction Fund. Plans to demolish the sole remaining historic building on campus, a two-story classroom wing built in 1927 and ultimately torn down in 2011, drew opposition.

== Campus ==
Parker's current campus opened in 2011. It is a 194,250 square foot facility that was constructed at a final cost of $41 million. The new building was built on a site adjacent to the existing facility, which was then demolished in order to make room for parking and athletic facilities. The school has a media center, a distance-learning lab, a career tech wing and an auditorium that can hold 750 students. The cafeteria seats more than 350.

== Student profile and athletics ==
Enrollment in grades 9-12 for the 2013–14 school year is 884 students. Approximately 98% of students are African-American, 1% are Hispanic, and 1% are multiracial. Roughly 90% of students qualify for free or reduced price lunch.

Parker has a graduation rate of 49%. Approximately 62% of its students meet or exceed proficiency standards in mathematics, and 52% meet or exceed standards in reading. The average ACT score for Parker students is 19.

Parker has numerous athletic teams and multiple state championships. The football team won the 2024 6A state championship. Frank Warren is the current head football coach. The boys basketball team has won four state championships total. Dannelle Smith is the current head boys basketball coach. The boys track team has won one state championship. Jackson Bowden is the current head track and field coach.

Tyrus Moss is the current head baseball coach as well as assistant principal. Parker started a golf team in 2024, with Darrell Hudson serving as head coach in addition to being the school's principal. Parker will field a tennis team for the first time in school history starting in the 2026 season, with Jack Rusevlyan serving as head coach.

== Notable alumni ==
- Oscar W. Adams Jr., Alabama Supreme Court justice
- Eric Bledsoe, NBA basketball player for the New Orleans Pelicans
- Bill Bruton, MLB player
- Buck Buchanan, Pro Football Hall of Fame defensive tackle
- Nell Carter, singer and actress
- Julius Ellsberry, American killed during the attack on Pearl Harbor
- Clyde Foster, NASA EEO director
- Louis Gillis, Negro league catcher
- Acie Griggs, Negro league second baseman
- Wiley Griggs, Negro league infielder
- Erskine Hawkins, musician
- Lola Hendricks, civil rights activist
- Emma Lucille Littlejohn- Haywood, South Side Matrons Keenagers, mission no.1
- Haywood Henry, jazz saxophonist
- Wendell Hudson, basketball player and coach
- Larry Langford, former mayor of Birmingham
- Raymond Lee Lathan, member of the Wisconsin State Assembly
- Helen Shores Lee, judge for the 10th Judicial Circuit of Alabama
- Carlos May, MLB player
- Lee May, MLB player
- Willie E. May, Undersecretary of Commerce for Standards and Technology and Director of the National Institute of Standards and Technology from 2015 to 2017
- Allen Murphy, basketball player
- Na'eem Offord, football cornerback
- Avery Parrish, jazz musician
- George Perdue, Alabama legislator
- Eddie Phillips, basketball player
- Sun Ra, jazz musician
- John Rhoden, sculptor
- Roderick Royal, former Birmingham City Councilman
- Bennie Seltzer, basketball coach
- Walter Sharpe, basketball player
- Olanda Truitt, former NFL wide receiver
- Lynneice Washington, lawyer and district attorney
- Chris Woods, football player
