= Birmingham Civil Rights Institute =

History museum in Birmingham, Alabama, US

Coordinates: 33.516°N 86.815°W

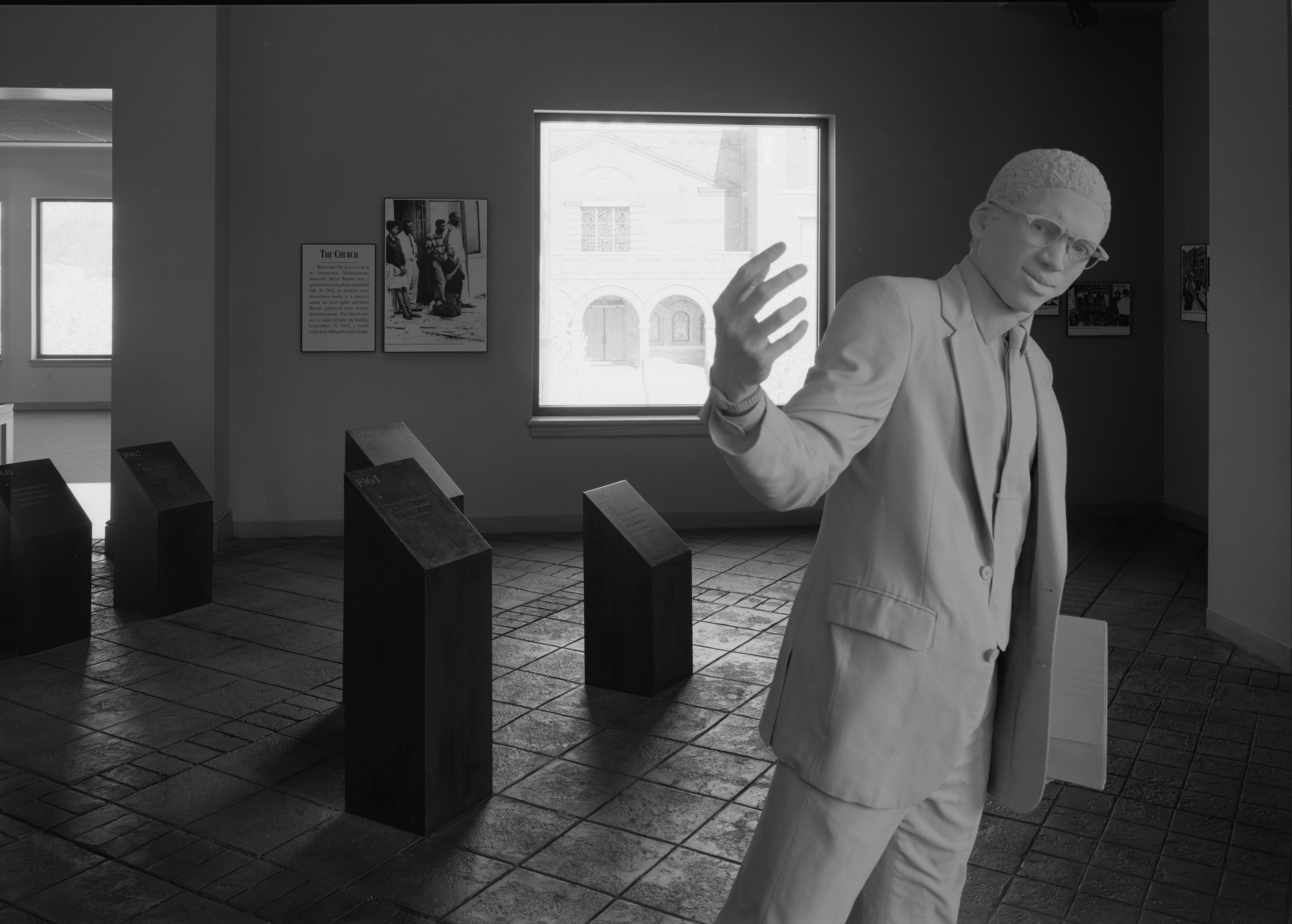
- The 16th Street Baptist Church section of the Milestone exhibition gallery in the Birmingham Civil Rights Institute, in Birmingham, Alabama. A bomb went off at the church on September 15, 1963. -- (HABS photo)
- Established: November 1992
- Location: Birmingham, Alabama
- Type: History museum
- Collection size: Multimedia exhibitions on the Civil Rights Movement and African-American history
- Visitors: Over 25,000 in its first week
- Website: www.bcri.org

Birmingham Civil Rights Institute is a comprehensive museum and educational center in Birmingham, Alabama, that depicts the events and actions of the 1963 Birmingham campaign, its Children's Crusade, and others of the Civil Rights Movement in the 1950s and 1960s. The Institute is located in the Civil Rights District, which includes the historic 16th Street Baptist Church, Kelly Ingram Park, Fourth Avenue Business District, and the Alabama Jazz Hall of Fame located in the Carver Theatre. The Institute opened in November 1992, and had more than 25,000 visitors during its first week.

== Exhibits ==
The Institute showcases a walking journey through the "living institution", which displays the lessons of the past as a positive way to chart new directions for the future. The permanent exhibitions are a self-directed journey through Birmingham's contributions to the Civil Rights Movement and human rights struggles. Multimedia exhibitions focus on the history of African-American life and the struggle for civil rights. The Oral History Project, one of the museum's multimedia exhibits, documents Birmingham's role in the Civil Rights Movement through the voices of movement participants. The museum is an affiliate in the Smithsonian Affiliations program. Through this program, the museum can acquire long-term loans and is currently hosting the Smithsonian Institution Traveling Exhibition Service exhibition "Let Your Motto Be resistance."

== Legislation ==
On May 24, 2013, President Barack Obama signed into law H.R. 360 from the 113th United States Congress, a bill which awarded the Congressional Gold Medal to Addie Mae Collins, Denise McNair, Carole Robertson, and Cynthia Wesley to commemorate the lives they lost 50 years ago in the bombing of 16th Street Baptist Church. The gold medal was given to the Birmingham Civil Rights Institute to display or loan out to other museums.

On March 21, 2016, Rep. Terri Sewell introduced to the United States House of Representatives H.R. 4817, a bill that would designate the Birmingham Civil Rights District, including the Civil Rights Institute, as a National Park. On March 28, 2016, the bill was referred to the Subcommittee on Federal Lands. However, a portion of the district was designated by executive order by President Obama as the Birmingham Civil Rights National Monument on January 12, 2017.

== Fred L. Shuttlesworth Human Rights Award ==
- Angela Davis was originally to receive the 2018 award but it was soon rescinded and no alternate recipient was chosen to replace her. The Birmingham Institute stated, "after closer examination of Ms. Davis' statements and public record, we concluded that she unfortunately does not meet all of the criteria on which the award is based," based on her support of the boycotting of Israeli institutions in support of Palestine. On January 25, the BCRI reversed their decision to rescind the Shuttleworth Award to Davis, stating that there should have been more consultation.

== See also ==
- Congressional gold medal award to victims of the 16th Street Baptist Church bombing (H.R. 360; 113th Congress)
- Birmingham Civil Rights National Monument
- List of museums focused on African Americans
- Mississippi Civil Rights Museum
- National Civil Rights Museum
- National Voting Rights Museum
