= After Hours (Avery Parrish song) =

Blues piano composition by Avery Parrish

"After Hours" is a blues piano composition composed by pianist Avery Parrish. It is usually played in G.

The first recording of the song was by Parrish with the Erskine Hawkins Orchestra, on June 10, 1940, and was released on the Bluebird record label. It was an instant hit, and subsequently became a jazz standard. The song has been recorded many times by such diverse artists as Benny Goodman, Dizzy Gillespie with Sonny Rollins and Sonny Stitt, Woody Herman, Hazel Scott, Phineas Newborn, Hank Crawford, Buck Clayton, Ellis Marsalis, Roy Buchanan, Ryo Fukui, Muddy Waters and numerous others.

The version used since 1984 as the theme song for the Jazz After Hours program on Public Radio International is a solo piano performance by Ray Bryant, recorded at the 1972 Montreux Jazz Festival.
