= Dud Bascomb =

American musician

- Born: Wilbur Odell Bascomb; May 16, 1916; Birmingham, Alabama, U.S.
- Died: December 25, 1972 (aged 56) New York City, U.S.
- Genres: Jazz
- Occupation: Musician
- Instrument: Trumpet
- Years active: 1930s – 1960s
- Label: Savoy
- Formerly of: Bama State Collegians; Erskine Hawkins big band

Wilbur Odell "Dud" Bascomb (May 16, 1916, Birmingham, Alabama – December 25, 1972, New York City) was an American jazz trumpeter, best known for his tenure with Erskine Hawkins. He was a 1979 inductee of the Alabama Jazz Hall of Fame.

== Early life ==
Bascomb was born the youngest of a family of ten children, another of whom was future tenor saxophonist Paul Bascomb. He played piano as a child but settled on trumpet, first playing with Erskine Hawkins at the Alabama State Teachers' School (now Alabama State University) in 1932, where Hawkins led the Bama State Collegians band.

== Career ==
Bascomb remained in Hawkins's employ until 1944 and soloed with him on many of his most well-known recordings.

He eventually left Hawkins to play in his brother's septet, which became a big band later in the decade. He played briefly with Duke Ellington in 1947. In the 1950s, Bascomb played for three years at Tyle's Chicken Shack in New Jersey, leading a quintet which counted Lou Donaldson among its members. He toured Japan three times with Sam Taylor and Europe with Buddy Tate in the 1960s, in addition to touring and recording with James Brown. He recorded sparingly as a leader; his Savoy Records sessions in 1959–60 were not issued until 1986.

== Discography ==
- James Brown, Out of Sight (Smash, 1964)
- James Brown, Say It Loud – I'm Black and I'm Proud (King, 1969)
- Freddie McCoy, Listen Here (Prestige, 1968)
- Buddy Tate, Buddy Tate and His Celebrity Club Orchestra (Black & Blue, 1969)
- Buddy Tate, Unbroken (MPS, 1970)
