= Public Law 113–11 =

2013 United States federal law

- Long title: To award posthumously a Congressional Gold Medal to Addie Mae Collins, Denise McNair, Carole Robertson, and Cynthia Wesley, in recognition of the 50th commemoration of the bombing of the Sixteenth Street Baptist Church where the 4 little Black girls lost their lives, which served as a catalyst for the Civil Rights Movement.
- Announced in: the 113th United States Congress
- Sponsored by: Rep. Terri A. Sewell (D, AL-7)
- Number of co-sponsors: 8

Codification
- Acts affected: Civil Rights Act of 1964, Voting Rights Act of 1965
- U.S.C. sections affected: 31 U.S.C. § 5134, 31 U.S.C. § 5136,
- Agencies affected: United States Congress, United States Department of the Treasury,
- Authorizations of appropriations: an unlimited amount

Legislative history
- Introduced in the House as H.R. 360 by Rep. Terri Sewell (D-AL) on January 23, 2013; Committee consideration by United States House Committee on Financial Services; Passed the House on April 24, 2013 (Roll Call 123: 420-0); Passed the Senate on May 9, 2013 (Unanimous Consent); Signed into law by President Barack Obama on May 24, 2013

The bill H.R. 360, which became Pub. L. 113–11 (text) (PDF), was a bill that was introduced into the United States House of Representatives during the 113th United States Congress. The purpose of the bill, as explained in the bill's long title, was "to award posthumously a Congressional Gold Medal to Addie Mae Collins, Denise McNair, Carole Robertson, and Cynthia Wesley to commemorate the lives they lost 50 years ago in the bombing of the Sixteenth Street Baptist Church, where these 4 little Black girls' ultimate sacrifice served as a catalyst for the Civil Rights Movement." The law authorizes the creation of one Congressional Gold Medal, to be sent to the Birmingham Civil Rights Institute in Birmingham, AL for display. The Treasury Department is also authorized to create bronze copies for sale.

== Background ==
More information about these four girls and the bombing they were killed in can be found in the article on the 16th Street Baptist Church bombing.

== Provisions/Elements of the bill ==
This summary is based largely on the summary provided by the Congressional Research Service, a public domain source.

The law directs the Speaker of the House of Representatives and the President pro tempore of the Senate to arrange for the presentation of a congressional gold medal to commemorate the lives of Addie Mae Collins, Denise McNair, Carole Robertson, and Cynthia Wesley (children who lost their lives in the September 1963 bombing of the 16th Street Baptist Church in Birmingham, Alabama, an incident recognized as a catalyst during the Civil Rights Movement). It requires that the congressional gold medal to be given to the Birmingham Civil Rights Institute in Birmingham, AL, where it shall be available for display or temporary loan to other appropriate places. Finally, the law authorizes the Secretary of the Treasury to strike and sell bronze duplicates of the medal, with amounts received from the sale to be deposited in the U.S. Mint Public Enterprise Fund.

== Procedural history ==
=== House ===
The bill H.R. 360 was introduced into the House by Rep. Terri Sewell (D-AL) on January 23, 2013. It was referred to the United States House Committee on Financial Services. The House voted to pass H.R. 360 on April 2, 2013, by a vote of 420–0, found in Roll Call 123.

=== Senate ===
H.R. 360 was received in the United States Senate on April 25, 2013. It passed on May 9, 2013, by unanimous consent.

=== President ===
The bill was presented to President Barack Obama on May 15, 2013, and he signed it into law on May 24, 2013.

== See also ==
- List of bills in the 113th United States Congress
