= Taste of 4th Avenue Jazz Festival =

Coordinates: 33°31′14″N 86°48′8″W

The Taste of 4th Avenue Jazz Festival is a one-day jazz festival which has been presented annually since 2003 in Birmingham's Historic 4th Avenue District downtown. In past years, it was sponsored by the Alabama Jazz Hall of Fame (AJHoF) and Urban Impact. Beginning in 2011, the festival was presented by Magic City Smooth Jazz. The event offers jazz music, food, swing dance lessons and exhibits, and presents nationally known jazz artists and local jazz artists.

== 2011 Performers ==
The 2011 festival was held on September 24, this year presented by Magic City Smooth Jazz. The lineup of performers was as follows:

- 2:00pm – 2:45pm Alabama Jazz Hall of Fame Student All Stars, directed by Ray Reach
- 3:00pm – 3:45pm Bo Berry
- 4:00pm – 4:45pm Neo Jazz Collective
- 5:00pm – 5:45pm Cleveland Eaton & the Alabama All Stars
- 6:00pm – 6:45pm Darryl Evan Jones
- 7:00pm – 7:45pm Jose's Jazz Quintet
- 8:00pm – 9:30pm Paul Taylor

== 2008 Performers ==
The 2008 festival was held on September 27. The lineup of performers included: Donald Witherspoon as Billy Ocean, the Neo Jazz Collective, On Purpose, Daniel Jose Carr, the Birmingham Heritage Band, Tekneek, Ona Watson, Dee Lucas, trumpeter Lew Soloff and the Ray Reach Quartet (with Cleveland Eaton on bass), guitarist Eric Essix with Joey Sommerville and violinist Michael Ward.

== 2007 Performers ==
The 2007 festival was held on September 29 and about 6,000 people were in attendance. It began with an opening parade at Kelly Ingram Park with Mayor Bernard Kincaid and Councilman William A. Bell officiating. Music began at 2:00 pm and continued until midnight. Featured performers included Jose Carr, The Alabama Jazz Hall of Fame Youth Ensemble, Jerome Chapman, vocalist Annie Sellick with Ray Reach and Cleveland Eaton, Foxxy Fatts & Co, Gary Motley, Dee Lucas, Ronnie Laws, Debra Laws, Donald Witherspoon as "Billy Ocean" and the Birmingham Heritage Band. The festival also featured work by urban artists, a swing tent, and a re-creation of the Little Savoy Juke Joint.

== 2006 Performers ==
The 2006 festival was held on September 23, the same weekend as the Sidewalk Moving Picture Festival. It began with a New Orleans style parade at 1:00 PM and continued with the New Orleans All-Stars, Tommy Stewart, Ray Reach and Friends, Foxxy Fatts & Co, Cleveland Eaton, Rolando Matias & the Afro Rican Ensemble featuring Bobby Matos, Johnny O'Neal, Eric Essix, Dee Lucas, the Birmingham Heritage Band, and Donald Witherspoon as "Billy Ocean." Other activities included a swing-dancing tent, a children's area, and food and gift vendors.
