= Acie Griggs =

American baseball player

- Second baseman
- Born: September 13, 1923; Union Springs, Alabama, U.S.
- Died: June 11, 2007 (aged 83); Birmingham, Alabama, U.S.
- Batted: Right Threw: Right

Negro league baseball debut
- 1948, for the New York Cubans

Last appearance
- 1957, for the Birmingham Black Barons
- Stats at Baseball Reference

Teams
- New York Cubans (1948); Birmingham Black Barons (1949–1957)

Asa Griggs (September 13, 1923 – June 11, 2007), nicknamed "Skeet", was an American Negro league second baseman in the 1940s and 1950s.

A native of Union Springs, Alabama, Griggs was the brother of fellow Negro leaguer Wiley Griggs. Older brother Acie graduated from A. H. Parker High School and Alabama A&M University, and served in the US Navy during World War II. He played for the New York Cubans in 1948, and joined the Birmingham Black Barons in 1949, where he played through 1957. Griggs died in Birmingham, Alabama in 2007 at age 83.
