= Pauline Bray Fletcher =

American nurse

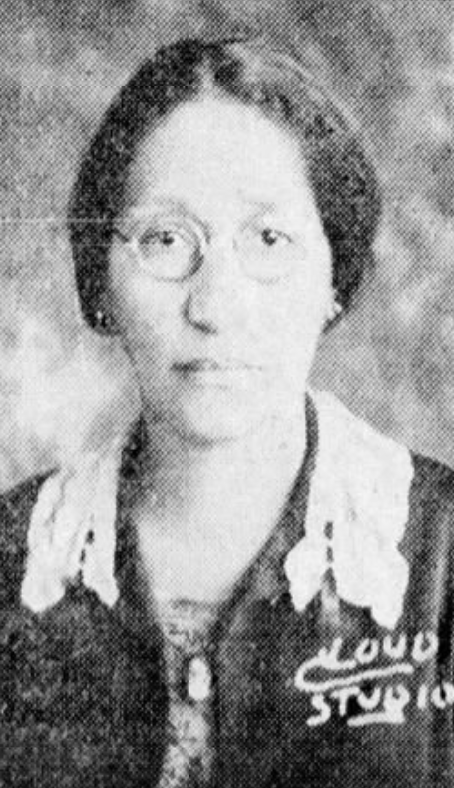
- Pauline Bray Fletcher, from a 1927 newspaper
- Born: Pauline Bray; May 8, 1884; Franklin County, Georgia
- Died: November 11, 1970 (aged 86); Birmingham, Alabama
- Other names: Pauline Braye Fletcher
- Occupations: Nurse, camping promoter

Pauline Bray Fletcher (May 8, 1884 – November 11, 1970), sometimes written as Pauline Braye Fletcher, was an American registered nurse and promoter of outdoor camping for black children in the Jim Crow South.

== Early life and education ==
Braye was born in Franklin County, Georgia, one of the six children of Andrew Jackson Bray and Mary Frances Bray. Her father was a farmer and her mother was a seamstress. She attended Haynes Institute in Georgia, and Hampton Institute in Virginia. She graduated from Huntsville Normal School in 1904. Her older brother James A. Bray was the first president of Miles College.

== Career ==
In 1906, Bray became head of the Birmingham Children's Home for Negroes Hospital. She was a health worker for United Charities of Birmingham from 1908 to 1909. From 1915 to 1920, she worked as a company nurse for American Cast Iron Pipe Company. She was a county nurse working with the Jefferson County Anti-Tuberculosis Association from 1920 to 1925.

Fletcher's public health work on tuberculosis prevention led her to focus on the environmental and nutritional needs of Black children. "Her dream was that she wanted to bring children out into the woods," explained La'Tanya Scott in a 2022 profile. "Get them out of Birmingham, out of the pollution into some fresh air to learn how to swim, to learn how to love nature, to not be afraid." She started the Girls' Service League, raised funds, bought land in Shades Valley near Bessemer, Alabama, built and opened Camp Margaret Murray Washington in 1926, as a recreational opportunity for Black children; the camp's name was changed to Camp Pauline Braye Fletcher in 1942.

In June 1948, while two white female Girl Scout instructors were staying on the grounds, the camp was raided by members of the Ku Klux Klan, and closed for the safety of the staff and campers. The general shock at the raid on a children's camp led to a state law in 1949, against wearing face coverings in public. The camp was used by scout troops, church groups, boys' clubs, the YWCA, and other organizations in the 1930s and 1940s. By 1951 the camp was expanding and improving, with a swimming pool, electric lighting, and increased kitchen capacity.

The Birmingham News compared Fletcher to Booker T. Washington and Robert Russa Moton, and described her in 1931 as "a woman of fine character, splendid intelligence, and a deep-seated humanity toward her own race as well as others". She was so respected that her face, name, and words were used to endorse a brand of coffee in newspaper advertisements. She retired as the camp's director in 1953. Supporters built a house for Fletcher's retirement, on land near the camp. In 1964, she was honored by the Birmingham Federation of Women's Clubs for her work.

== Personal life and legacy ==
Bray married twice. Her first husband was Edward David Morrison; they soon divorced. She married Andrew Jackson Fletcher in 1912; he died within a few years. Fletcher died in 1970, in Birmingham, at the age of 86. Campfire USA acquired Camp Fletcher in 2002; it is still open as of 2022, now run by the nonprofit Bridgeways of Alabama. There is a historical marker honoring Fletcher in Birmingham's Kelly Ingram Park.
