= Jerry Grundhoefer =

American jazz musician

Jerry Grundhoefer (a.k.a. Grundy) (1930–1997) was a jazz musician who played clarinet, piano, saxophone, organ, xylophone, and flute in Birmingham, Alabama. In 1980, Grundhoefer was inducted into the Alabama Jazz Hall of Fame.

== Early life ==
Born in St. Paul, Minnesota on July 22, 1930. Grundhoefer graduated from Cretin High School, (now Cretin-Derham Hall High School).

== Career ==
Grundhoefer's first public performances were playing organ at St. Paschal Catholic Church where he met Bernadine Mary "Bernie" Fitch, his future wife. Fitch and Grundhoefer were married at St. Croix River in 1950. Subsequently, he worked for American Dereck machines. Approximately one year later, Grundhoefer was working as a salesman for Hobart Sales and Services, playing music on the side.

Due to job transfers, the family moved from St. Paul to Atlanta, Georgia, to Raleigh, NC, while Grundhoefer opened offices for Hobart in these cities. They finally settled permanently in Birmingham, Alabama, in 1965. By this time, they had 9 children and Bernie was expecting another. They had 2 more children together after the move.

Grundhoefer opened Grundy's Music Hall in 1978 in Birmingham, Alabama, on 23rd Street North. In 1980, Grundy's Music Hall moved to the Clark Building on the corner of 19th Street North and 4th Avenue North. Among the musicians who performed at Grundy's were Sun Ra, Buddy Rich, Count Basie, Maynard Ferguson, Buddy Guy, Koko Taylor, Johnny O'Neal, Royce Campbell, Clark Terry, Ray Reach and many others. Grundy's closed in 1992.

After the closing of Grundy's, Grundhoefer continued to play in other Birmingham venues including Marty's Bar and Grill. Marty Eagle, the owner of Marty's, said of Grundhoefer in the Black and White City Paper, “I had Grundy in here on Sundays after Grundy's went out of business. He ran the jazz night, and nobody else could hold it together like he could. Somebody had to be the disciplinarian. And none of the others wanted to discipline any of the other people. But Jerry wanted a good show, and he did it right.”

== Death ==
In 1992, Grundhoefer was diagnosed with prostate cancer. He received a second diagnosis in 1993 of multiple myeloma. He died June 10, 1997.
