= Jean Kittrell =

Jazz musician and educator

Jean Kittrell was an American jazz pianist, vocalist and educator. She was known as the "Red Hot Mama of Dixieland Jazz".

== Early life and education ==
Kittrell was born in Birmingham, Alabama, USA She earned a Bachelor of Arts in Music Theory from Blue Mountain College, a Master's of Philosophy from the University of Chicago, and a Ph.D. in British Literature from Southern Illinois University in Carbondale.

== Career ==
=== Teaching ===
Kittrell's first teaching job was at the Alabama State Training School for Girls. She taught composition at Southern Illinois University in Carbondale around in 1967. From 1982 to 1986 she became the Department Chair at Southern Illinois University Edwardsville, where she was an English teacher until she retired in 1994.

Jean researched jazz history. She gave lectures about early styles of African American music and pioneering the incorporation of African American literature into the English department's curriculum at Southern Illinois University Edwardsville. She published Black Roots of Our American Music, in 1971.

=== Music ===
Kittrell grew up playing piano in her Southern Baptist church. She worked and performed with trumpeter Ed Kittrell, (her husband) in the Chesapeake Bay Jass Band. She played piano as a child at her church and for forty years thereafter at clubs and festivals, retiring in 2008.

She performed with the Chicago Stompers while living in Chicago, IL. She recorded an album with clarinetist Tony Parenti of Bessie Smith songs. She recorded albums with the Mississippi Mudcats Jazz Band and the Boll Weevil Jass Band in the 1970s. She led three bands based in Edwardsville near St. Louis: the Jazz Incredibles, the St. Louis Rivermen, and the Old St. Louis Levee Band. She performed until 2008 when she had to stop due to health issues.

== Death ==
Kittrell died on August 14, 2018 at 91 years in Edwardsville, Illinois, USA.

== Honors and awards ==
In 2015 she was elected to the Alabama Jazz Hall of Fame.
