= Julius Ellsberry =

- Born: August 22, 1921; Birmingham, Alabama
- Died: December 7, 1941 (aged 20); Pearl Harbor, Hawaii
- Military career
- Allegiance: United States of America
- Branch: United States Navy
- Service years: 1940–1941
- Rank: Mess Attendant, First Class
- Unit: USS Oklahoma (BB-37)
- Wars: World War II: Attack on Pearl Harbor †
- Awards: Purple Heart

Julius Ellsberry (August 22, 1921 – December 7, 1941) was an American killed during the Japanese attack on Pearl Harbor. He was the first Alabamian killed in World War II, and one of the first Americans to die in the Pacific during World War II. He was killed while aboard.

== Early life ==
Ellsberry was born in Birmingham, Alabama and was a 1938 graduate of Parker High School.

== Military career ==
Ellsberry enlisted in the United States Navy in 1940, and was serving aboard the USS Oklahoma (BB-37) as a Mess Attendant First Class when it was bombed by Japanese planes in the surprise attack on December 7, 1941. He and 413 other crewmen were killed aboard the battleship. He was awarded a posthumous Purple Heart in honor of his sacrifice.

A Navy press release followed shortly after the announcement of Ellsberry's death describing the heroism of another black seaman, then unidentified. Mess Attendant Second Class Doris Miller assumed control of a deck gun on the USS West Virginia (BB-48) after the gunner was killed and helped defend the ship. Media reports at the time often credited Ellsberry with Miller's heroism and the misidentification still sometimes persists.

== Legacy ==
The Birmingham World labeled Ellsberry "the Crispus Attucks of World War II". Birmingham's Black community raised over $300,000 in war bond purchases toward the completion of a B-24 Liberator named The Spirit of Ellsberry.

Birmingham's Ellsberry Park near Finley Boulevard north of downtown was dedicated in his honor in 1979. A marker honoring Ellsberry's sacrifice has also been erected in Kelly Ingram Park, which is named for fellow Navy veteran and Birmingham native Osmond Kelly Ingram, the first American killed in World War I.
