= Louis Gillis =

American baseball player (1924-2005)

- Catcher
- Born: August 8, 1924; Birmingham, Alabama, U.S.
- Died: February 3, 2005 (aged 80); Birmingham, Alabama, U.S.
- Batted: Right Threw: Right

Negro league baseball debut
- 1946, for the Atlanta Black Crackers

Last appearance
- 1952, for the Birmingham Black Barons

Teams
- Atlanta Black Crackers (1946–1947); Birmingham Black Barons (1950–1952)

Louis Charles Gillis Sr. (August 8, 1924 – February 3, 2005), nicknamed "Sea Boy", was an American Negro league catcher from 1946 to 1952.

A native of Birmingham, Alabama, Gillis graduated from A. H. Parker High School, and served in the US Marine Corps in World War II. He broke into the Negro leagues in 1946 with the Atlanta Black Crackers, and later played for the Birmingham Black Barons. Gillis died in Birmingham in 2005 at age 80.
