= Avery Parrish =

American jazz pianist, composer and arranger (1917–1959)

- Born: James Avery Parrish; January 24, 1917; Birmingham, Alabama, US
- Died: December 10, 1959 (aged 42) New York City, New York, US
- Genres: Jazz, blues
- Occupations: Musician, composer, arranger
- Instrument: Piano
- Years active: 1930s–1943

James Avery Parrish (January 24, 1917 – December 10, 1959) was an American jazz pianist, composer and arranger. He wrote and recorded "After Hours". Injuries from a bar fight in 1943 ended his career as a pianist.

== Early life ==
Parrish was born in Birmingham, Alabama. His parents were Curley and Fannie G. Parrish. Avery had at least one brother, who became an educator.

Parrish graduated from Parker High School in Birmingham. According to a gossip columnist in 1935, Parrish was at that time married to singer Velma Middleton.

== Later life ==
Parrish studied at the Alabama State Teachers College, where he played in the Bama State Collegians, an ensemble led by Erskine Hawkins. He remained in Hawkins's employ until 1942, and recorded with him extensively. Parrish wrote the music to "After Hours", and a 1940 recording of the tune with Hawkins's orchestra resulted in its becoming a jazz standard. He also wrote arrangements for Hawkins.

In August 1942 Parrish was injured in a car crash that killed Marcellus Green, one of Hawkins's trumpeters. They were in a group of five in the vehicle, driving between Pittsburgh and Chattanooga to gigs when it overturned. Parrish left Hawkins later that year and moved to California. He was a commercially successful solo pianist there. He was involved in a bar fight in 1943 – he was hit in the head by a bar stool – which put him in hospital for a few months. This left him partly paralyzed; he was unable to play music for the rest of his life.

Parrish died of unknown causes on December 10, 1959. A contemporary report stated that he "had been found lying in Harlem streets five days before he died at the Harlem Hospital. There were no marks of violence on his body." Author and music executive Arnold Shaw stated that Parrish suffered "a fall down a flight of stairs". At the time, Parrish was living with his mother on Saint Nicholas Avenue and "working as a porter for a local bottling company." He was buried in Ferncliff Cemetery, New York. He was survived by his mother and a brother, Julian.

In 1979, Parrish was inducted into the Alabama Jazz Hall of Fame.
