= Paul Bascomb =

American jazz saxophonist (1912–1986)

- Born: February 12, 1912; Birmingham, Alabama, U.S.
- Died: December 2, 1986 (aged 74) Chicago, Illinois, U.S.
- Genres: Jazz
- Occupation: Musician
- Instrument: Tenor saxophone
- Years active: late 1920s – mid-1980s
- Labels: States; Delmark; Parrot
- Formerly of: Bama State Collegians; Erskine Hawkins big band

Paul Bascomb (February 12, 1912 – December 2, 1986) was an American jazz tenor saxophonist, noted for his extended tenure with big band leader Erskine Hawkins. He is a 1979 inductee of the Alabama Jazz Hall of Fame.

== Career ==
Bascomb was a founding member of the Bama State Collegians, which was led by Erskine Hawkins and eventually became his big band. Bascomb's brother Dud played in this ensemble. Bascomb remained in this ensemble until 1944, aside from a brief interval in 1938 and 1939, where he played in Count Basie's orchestra after Herschel Evans's death. From 1944 to 1947, he and Dud co-led a septet which evolved into a big band. He recorded for States Records in 1952; these sides were reissued by Delmark Records in the 1970s. From 1953 to 1955, he recorded for Parrot Records, and was active as a performer nearly up until the time of his death.
