= Sam Ranelli =

American jazz drummer

Sam C. Ranelli (February 21, 1920 – December 30, 1999) was a professional big band jazz drummer from Birmingham, Alabama. Ranelli played with several famous big bands and eventually formed and led his own big band. In 1982, he was inducted into the Alabama Jazz Hall of Fame.
