= Na'eem Offord =

American football player

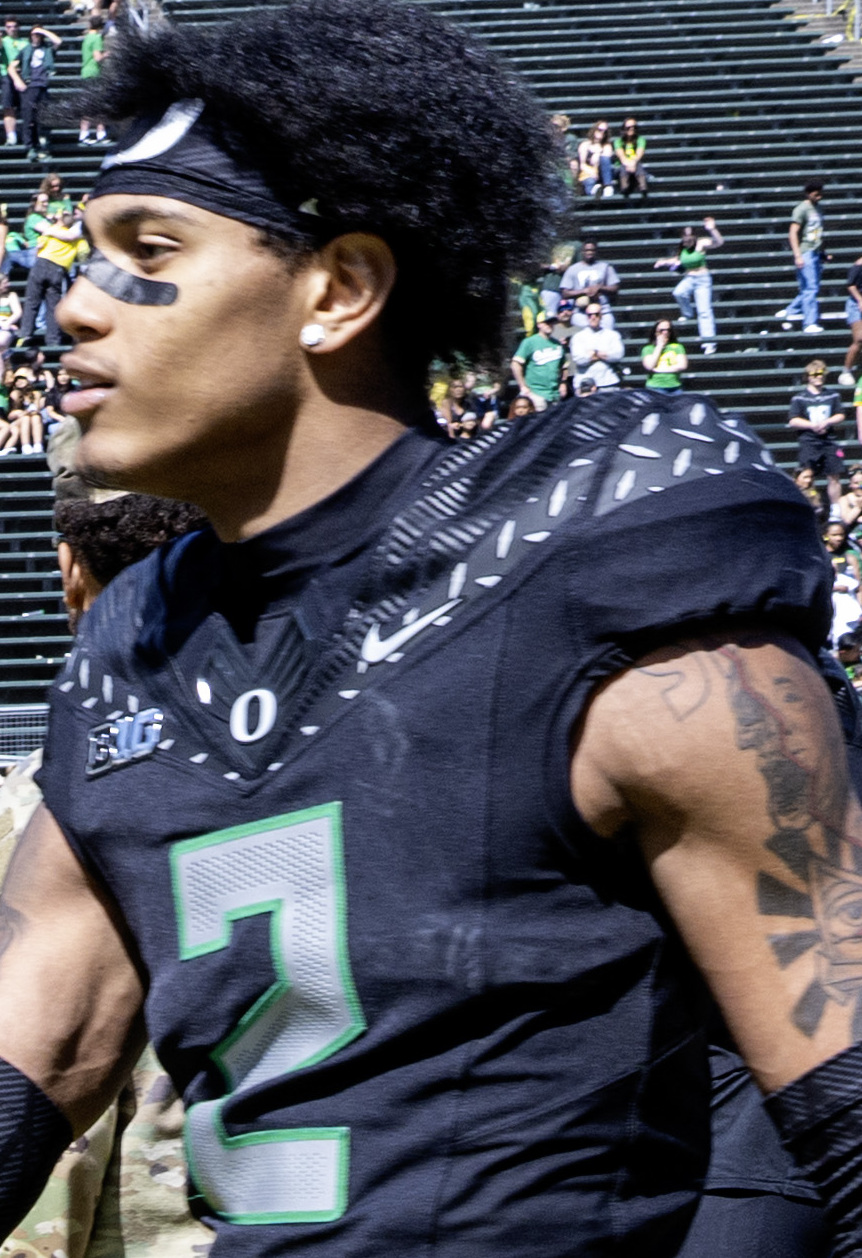
- Offord in 2026

No. 2 – Oregon Ducks
- Position: Cornerback
- Class: Sophomore

Personal information
- Listed height: 6 ft 1 in (1.85 m)
- Listed weight: 195 lb (88 kg)

Career information
- High school: A. H. Parker High School (Birmingham, Alabama)
- College: Oregon (2025–present)

Na'eem Offord is an American college football cornerback for Oregon Ducks. Offord was a five-star prospect and one of the top-ranked recruits for the class of 2025,

== Early life ==
Offord attended A. H. Parker High School in Birmingham, Alabama, where he played football and ran track. He received his first scholarship offer to play college football as a freshman in 2021, and became a starter on the varsity at wide receiver and cornerback in 2022, recording 13 tackles and 726 yards and six touchdowns that year. In a playoff game during the 2022 season, he was called in to play quarterback due to injuries; according to his coach, during the game "he had the flu – and he still had three touchdowns and about 120 yards rushing."

During his junior year, 2023, Offord tallied 17 tackles, five interceptions and four pass breakups on defense, while playing running back and wide receiver on offense and totaling 518 all-purpose yards with 10 offensive touchdowns and an additional two punt return touchdowns. He helped Parker compile a 13–1 record that season while appearing in the AHSAA 6A championship game.

In 2024, by the time of the class 6A championship game, Offord had totaled 43 tackles and four interceptions on defense while running for 525 yards and 14 touchdowns on 70 carries on offense. He led Parker to the class championship where the team defeated Saraland High School for the school's first-ever 6A title.

=== Recruiting ===
By February 2024, Offord was ranked the sixth-best player nationally and the number one overall cornerback recruit for the class of 2025. He was described as having "had the attention of nearly every college football program in the country" and was a five-star prospect. He announced his commitment to play for the Ohio State Buckeyes in February 2024. Following the 2024 season, he was ranked by 247Sports as the second-best cornerback recruit and the 12th-best prospect nationally. In December 2024, on National Signing Day, he announced that he was flipping his commitment from Ohio State to the Oregon Ducks.

== Personal life ==
Offord is the half-brother of Houston Cougars running back, Makhi Hughes.
