= Wiley Griggs =

American baseball player (1925–1996)

- Infielder
- Born: March 24, 1925; Union Springs, Alabama, U.S.
- Died: August 23, 1996 (aged 71); Birmingham, Alabama, U.S.
- Batted: Right Threw: Right

Negro league baseball debut
- 1948, for the Birmingham Black Barons

Last appearance
- 1958, for the Birmingham Black Barons
- Stats at Baseball Reference

Teams
- Birmingham Black Barons (1948–1950); Cleveland Buckeyes (1950); Houston Eagles (1950–1951); Birmingham Black Barons (1951–1958)

Wiley Lee Griggs III (March 24, 1925 – August 23, 1996), nicknamed "Diamond Jim", was an American Negro league infielder in the 1940s and 1950s.

A native of Union Springs, Alabama, Griggs was the brother of fellow Negro leaguer Acie Griggs. Younger brother Wiley attended A. H. Parker High School, and served in the US Army during World War II. He broke into the Negro leagues in 1948 with the Birmingham Black Barons, and was a reserve infielder that year as the team reached the Negro World Series. In 1951, he was selected to represent the Houston Eagles in the East–West All-Star Game. Griggs died in Birmingham, Alabama in 1996 at age 71.
