= Erskine Ramsay =

American industrialist (1864–1953)

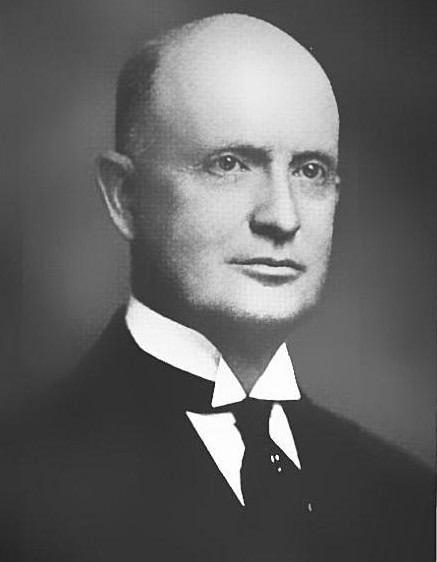
- Born: September 24, 1864; Six Mile Ferry, Pennsylvania, US
- Died: August 15, 1953 (aged 89); Birmingham, Alabama, US
- Education: Saint Vincent College
- Occupation(s): Mining Engineer, Industrialist
- Clip of Mayor Cooper Green during proclamation of Erskine Ramsay Day Clip of Mayor Cooper Green during proclamation of Erskine Ramsay Day; Recorded 09 June 1942 WAPI Voices of Alabama - Erskine Ramsay WAPI Voices of Alabama - Erskine Ramsay; Recorded 18 March 1947 WAPI Erskine Ramsay Memorial Service (clip) WAPI Erskine Ramsay Memorial Service (clip); Recorded August 1953

Signature
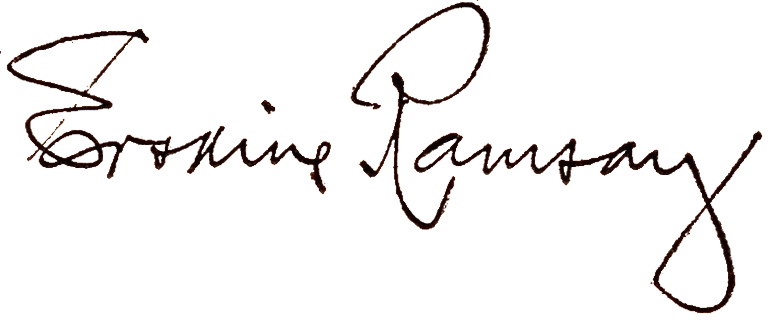

Erskine Ramsay (September 24, 1864 – August 15, 1953) was an Alabama industrialist and financier. He died on August 15, 1953, at age 88.

In his lifetime, Ramsay gave almost $5 million to charitable organizations.
