= List of jazz institutions and organizations =

This is a list of notable jazz institutions and organizations.

== A ==
- Alabama Jazz Hall of Fame, Birmingham, Alabama
- American Jazz Museum, Kansas City, Missouri
- Association for the Advancement of Creative Musicians, Chicago, Illinois

== B ==
- Ben Webster Foundation, Copenhagen, Denmark
- Berklee College of Music, Boston, Massachusetts
- Black Artists Group, St. Louis, Missouri

== I ==
- Institute of Jazz Studies, Newark, New Jersey
- International Association for Jazz Education (IAJE), Manhattan, Kansas
- International Jazz Festivals Organization

== J ==
- Jazz at Lincoln Center, New York City, New York
- Jazz Bridge, Philadelphia, Pennsylvania
- Jazz Foundation of America, New York City, New York
- Jazz Institute of Chicago, Chicago, Illinois
- Jazz Interactions, New York City, New York
- Jazz Loft Project, University of Arizona and Duke University
- Jazz on the Square, Woodstock, Illinois
- Jazzmobile, New York City, New York
- Jazzschool, Berkeley, California
- John W. Coltrane Cultural Society, Philadelphia, Pennsylvania

== L ==
- Left Bank Jazz Society, Baltimore, Maryland
- Louis Armstrong House, Corona, Queens, New York

== M ==
- Manchester Craftsmen's Guild/MCG Jazz, Pittsburgh, Pennsylvania

== N ==
- National Orchestra Service, Omaha, Nebraska
- New Orleans Jazz National Historical Park, New Orleans, Louisiana
- The New School for Jazz and Contemporary Music, New York City, New York

== O ==
- Oklahoma Jazz Hall of Fame, Tulsa, Oklahoma

== S ==
- Stanford Jazz Workshop, Stanford, California

== T ==
- Thelonious Monk Institute of Jazz, Washington, D.C.; Los Angeles, California; and New Orleans, Louisiana
- Tomorrow's Warriors, London, UK

== See also ==
- Timeline of jazz education
