= Children's Crusade (1963) =

1963 civil rights march by schoolchildren in Birmingham, Alabama, U.S.

- Part of the Birmingham campaign in the Civil Rights Movement
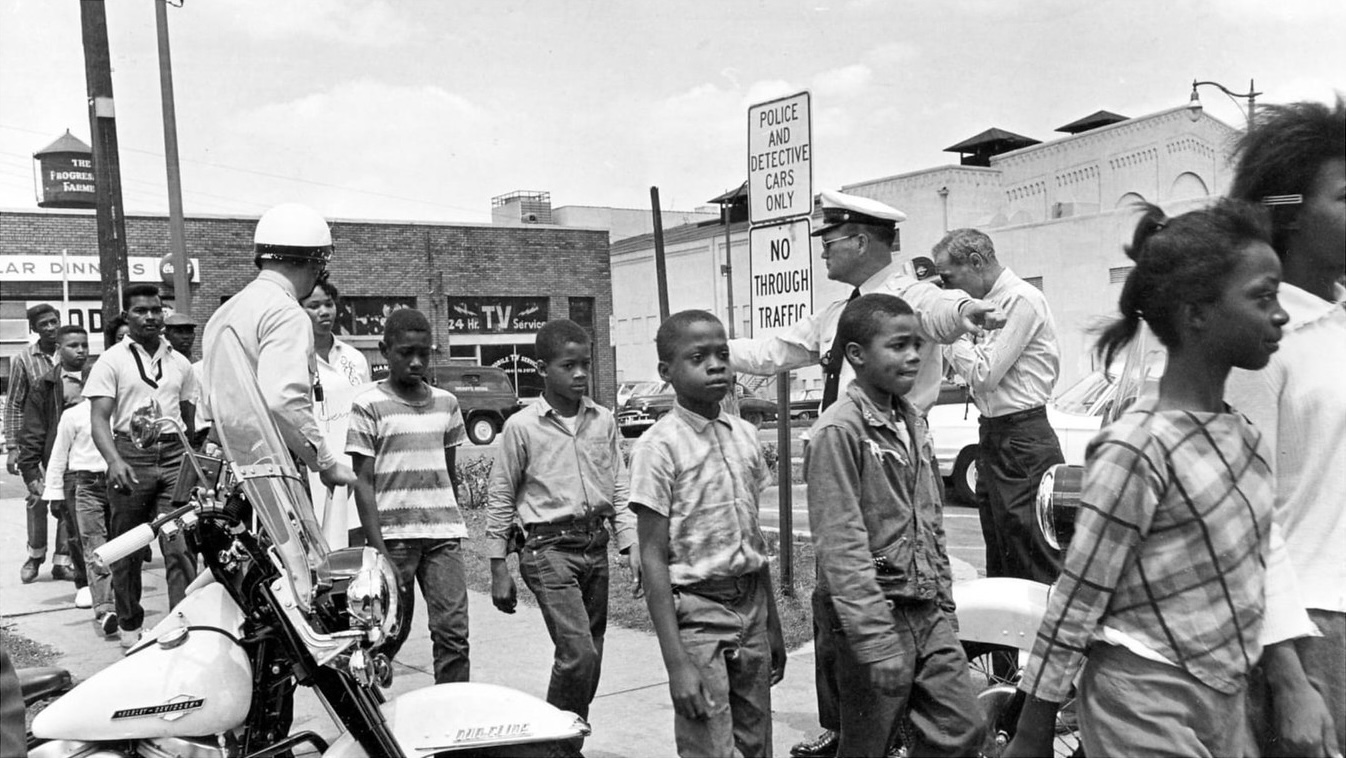
- Children protesting during the 1963 Children's Crusade in Birmingham
- Date: May 2–3, 1963
- Location: Birmingham, Alabama

Parties
Southern Christian Leadership Conference (SCLC)	City Commission of Birmingham; Birmingham Police Department; Birmingham Fire Department

Lead figures
SCLC member: James Bevel	Commissioner of Public Safety: Bull Connor

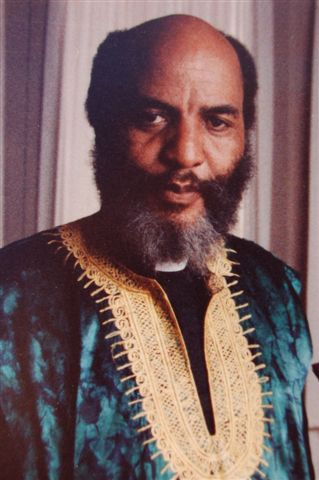
James Bevel initiated, organized, and taught the children and students nonviolence before they set out to walk to Birmingham city hall to talk to the mayor about removing legalized segregation.

The Children's Crusade, or Children's March, was a march by over 1,000 school students in Birmingham, Alabama, on May 2–10, 1963. Initiated and organized by Rev. James Bevel, the purpose of the march was to walk downtown to talk to the mayor about legalized segregation in their city. Many children left their schools and were arrested, set free, and then arrested again the next day. The marches were stopped by the head of police, Bull Connor, who brought fire hoses to ward off the children and set police dogs after the children. This event compelled President John F. Kennedy to publicly support federal civil rights legislation and eventually led to the passage of the Civil Rights Act of 1964.

Martin Luther King Jr. and others, such as Malcolm X, were opposed to the event because they thought it would expose the children to violence.

== Background ==
Although the Civil Rights Movement had been active under Martin Luther King's leadership, little progress was being made following the dramatic gains of the student movement in 1960 and 1961. After some major legal victories, the movement was beginning to stagnate. President Kennedy supported civil rights but held back from introducing his own bill, and King was running out of options. He looked to Birmingham, where African Americans lived segregated and in fear as second-class citizens. In January 1963, Dr. King arrived to organize nonviolent protests such as marches and sit-ins. The goal was to get a reaction from the racist officials that would not only spotlight the injustice of the south but gain national attention and support.

However, authorities adapted to his nonviolent approach. Drastic measures were then taken by SCLC's James Bevel before Dr. King abandoned Birmingham. Bevel, realizing that adults feared becoming involved because an arrest may cause loss of their jobs, decided that children would become involved instead and march to City Hall. During their marches the city officials reacted with violence, giving the Civil Rights Movement the jolt and leverage needed to accomplish its ultimate goals.

== Event ==
On May 2, 1963, thousands of children gathered at 16th Street Baptist Church in place of their parents, who, under Alabama law and social oppression, faced harsh penalties such as loss of their jobs and jail time if they protested the racist and unjust segregation laws of Alabama.

In response to the mass arrests of the children, Commissioner of Public Safety, Bull Connor, finally ordered police to use police dogs, high-pressure fire hoses, batons, and arrest these children if "deemed" necessary. Despite this harsh treatment, children still participated in the marches. On May 5, protesters marched to the city jail where many young people were being held and continued practicing their tactics of nonviolent demonstrations. Jail cells were filled to capacity with children, and there were not enough police to manage the children.

John F. Kennedy did not like this, as he called King and told him to stop the crusade and told him that he could not afford to have children get hurt. However, Martin Luther King Jr., after talking to James Bevel, told Kennedy that children were already hurting across the country.

== Federal response ==
Before the Children's March, federal response was limited in an effort to balance federal authority and state rights. The Children's March played a pivotal role in ending legal segregation, as the media coverage of the event further brought the plight of Southern African Americans to the national stage. After additional measures were taken, President Kennedy could not avoid the issue, and on June 11, 1963, in a "Report to the American People on Civil Rights", he announced his intentions to establish new federal civil rights legislation and end legalized segregation in the United States:

This is not a sectional issue ... Nor is this a partisan issue ... This is not even a legal or legislative issue alone ... We are confronted primarily with a moral issue. ...

If an American, because his skin is dark, cannot eat lunch in a restaurant open to the public; if he cannot send his children to the best public school available; if he cannot vote for the public officials who represent him; if, in short, he cannot enjoy the full and free life which all of us want – then who among us would be content to have the color of his skin changed and stand in his place? Who among us would then be content with the counsels of patience and delay? ...

We preach freedom around the world, and we mean it, and we cherish our freedom here at home. But are we to say to the world, and much more importantly to each other, that this is the land of the free – except for the negroes? That we have no second class citizens – except negroes? That we have no class or caste system, no ghettoes, no master race – except with respect to negroes?

== Aftermath ==
After the march, the Civil Rights Movement regained momentum, and on August 28 Dr. King led the March on Washington where he delivered his famous "I Have a Dream" speech. But on September 15, the Ku Klux Klan bombed the 16th Street Baptist Church, killing four African American girls, and on November 22 President Kennedy was assassinated. It was President Lyndon B. Johnson who saw the 1964 Civil Rights Act through, a victory for the Civil Rights Movement made possible because of the children of Birmingham.

The children who died in the church bombing were Addie Mae Collins, Cynthia Wesley, and Carole Robertson, all 14, and Denise McNair, 11.

== See also ==
- Timeline of the civil rights movement
- Mighty Times: The Children's March
- American Heroes Channel: "What History Forgot" Season 2, Episode 5
