= Sam Taylor (saxophonist) =

American jazz and blues saxophonist (1916–1990)

- Born: Samuel Leroy Taylor Jr. July 12, 1916; Lexington, Tennessee, U.S.
- Died: October 5, 1990 (aged 74) Atlanta, Georgia, U.S.
- Genres: Jazz; R&B; blues
- Occupations: Musician; bandleader
- Instrument: Tenor saxophone
- Formerly of: Bama State Collegians

Samuel Leroy Taylor Jr. (July 12, 1916 – October 5, 1990), known as Sam "The Man" Taylor, was an American jazz, rhythm and blues, and blues tenor saxophonist and bandleader.

== Biography ==
Taylor was born in Lexington, Tennessee, United States. He attended Alabama State University, where he played with the Bama State Collegians. He later worked with Scatman Crothers, Cootie Williams, Lucky Millinder, Cab Calloway, Ray Charles, Buddy Johnson, Louis Jordan, and Big Joe Turner. Taylor was one of the most requested session saxophone players in New York recording studios in the 1950s. He also replaced Count Basie as the house bandleader on Alan Freed's radio series, Camel Rock 'n Roll Dance Party, on CBS.

Taylor played the saxophone solo on Turner's "Shake, Rattle and Roll". He also played on "Harlem Nocturne"; on "Money Honey", recorded by Clyde McPhatter and The Drifters in 1953; and on "Sh-Boom" by The Chords.

During the 1960s, he led a five-piece band, the Blues Chasers. In the 1970s, he frequently played and recorded in Japan.

Taylor died in 1990 in Crawford Long Hospital, in Atlanta, Georgia, at the age of 74.

== Discography ==
- Blue Mist (MGM, 1955)
- Music with the Big Beat (MGM, 1956)
- Out of This World (MGM, 1956)
- Rockin' Sax and Rollin' Organ, with Dick Hyman (MGM, 1957)
- Jazz for Commuters (MetroJazz, 1958)
- More Blue Mist (MGM, 1959)
- Mist of the Orient (MGM [E4066], 1962)
- In Japan (MGM [SMM-1019])
- The Bad and the Beautiful (Moodsville, 1962)
- Misty Mood (Decca, 1962)
- It's a Blue World (Decca, 1963)
- Watermelon Man, with Frank Hunter and the Huntsmen (Epic, 1963)
- Somewhere in the Night (Decca, 1964)
- A Musical Portrait of Ray Charles, with LeRoy Holmes and his Orchestra (MGM)
- Love You Tokyo (Crown [GW-7001 C.M.P.], 1967)
- Ima Wa Shiawasekai (Crown [GW-7002 C.M.P.], 1968)
- Hana to Namida (Crown [GW-7005], 1969)
- Koga Melodies: Best Collection (Pony Canyon, c. 1970)
- Eternal Standard (Pony Canyon, c. 1971)
- Bokyo Shiretokoryojo (Crown [GW-7015 C.M.P.], 1971)
- Hit Melodies from Shi Retoko to Nagasaki (Crown [GW-7055 C.M.P.], 1973)
- Onna No Sadame (Crown [GW-7070 C.M.P.], 1974)
- The Blue Mood of Sam Taylor (MCA [MCA-9050-511974])
- Song of Street (Crown [GW-20051-52], 1975)
- Mood Tenor Sax, with Yokouchi Shoji, Kosugi Jinsan Three (Crown [GW-20139-40], 1975)
- Sam (The Man) Taylor Vol. 1 (Crown [GW-20239-40], 1978)
- Standard Best Collection Vols. I & II (Japan, 1999)
- Bluesy Sam Taylor (Polydor [SMP-2004])
- Blue Light Yokohama (Polydor [SMP-2043])

=== As sideman ===
With The Chords

- Sh-Boom (Cat), 1954

With Ruth Brown

- Ruth Brown (Atlantic), 1957
- Miss Rhythm (Atlantic), 1959

With Freddy Cole

- Waiter, Ask the Man to Play the Blues (Dot), 1964

With Al Hibbler

- After the Lights Go Down Low (Atlantic), 1957

With Langston Hughes

- Weary Blues (MGM), 1958

With Quincy Jones

- The Birth of a Band! (Mercury), 1959
- Quincy Plays for Pussycats (Mercury, 1959-65 [1965])

== See also ==
- Harlem Nocturne
