= Kelly Ingram Park =

Park in Birmingham, Alabama, United States

Coordinates: 33.5163°N 86.8134°W

- U.S. National Register of Historic Places
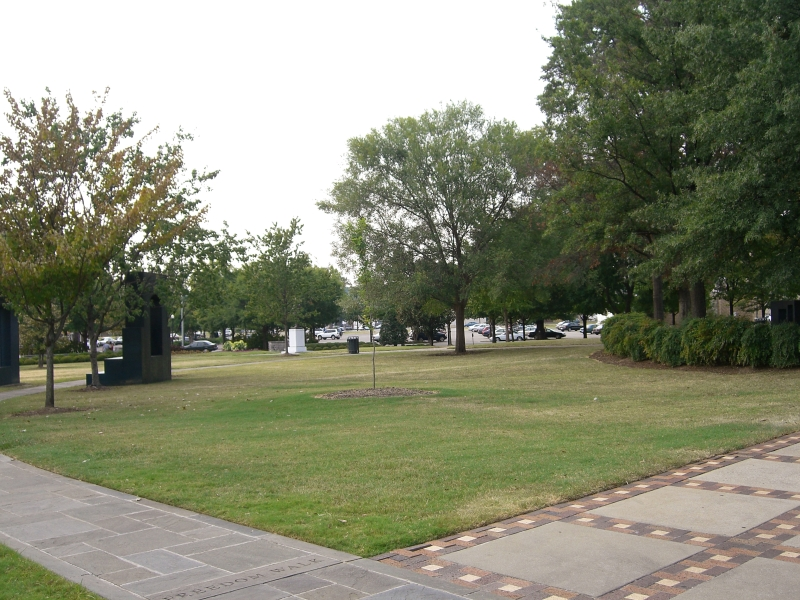
- Kelly Ingram Park

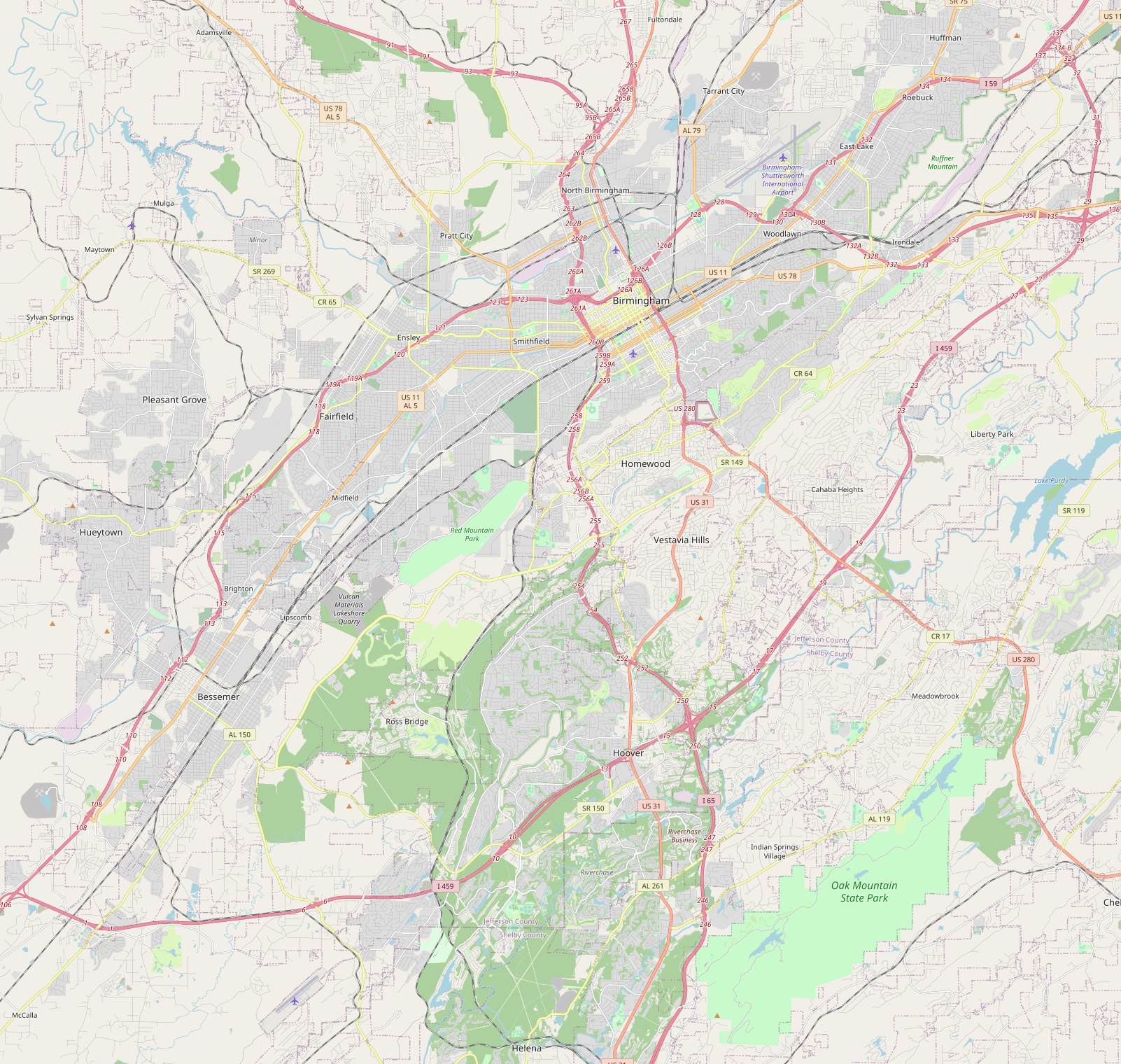
- Location within Birmingham, Alabama Location within Alabama Location within the United States
- Location: 5th Ave. N and 16th St., Birmingham, Alabama
- Area: less than one acre
- Built: 1871
- NRHP reference No.: 84000636
- Added to NRHP: May 24, 1984

Kelly Ingram Park, formerly West Park, is a four-acre (1.6 ha) park located in Birmingham, Alabama. It is bounded by 16th and 17th Streets and 5th and 6th Avenues North in the Birmingham Civil Rights District. The park, just outside the doors of the 16th Street Baptist Church, served as a central staging ground for large-scale demonstrations during the American Civil Rights Movement of the 1960s.

Reverend James Bevel of the Southern Christian Leadership Conference directed the organized protest by students in 1963 which centered on Kelly Ingram Park. It was here, during the first week of May 1963, that Birmingham police and firemen, under orders from Public Safety Commissioner Eugene "Bull" Connor, confronted the student demonstrators emerging from the 16th Street Baptist Church, almost all of them children and high school students, first with mass arrests and then with police dogs and firehoses. Images from those confrontations, broadcast internationally, spurred a public outcry which turned the nation's attention to the struggle for racial equality. The demonstrations in Birmingham brought city leaders to agree to an end of public segregation and helped to ensure the writing and then the passage of the Civil Rights Act of 1964.

The park was named in 1932 for local firefighter Osmond Kelly Ingram, who was the first sailor in the United States Navy to be killed in World War I. In 1992 it was completely renovated and rededicated as "A Place of Revolution and Reconciliation" to coincide with the opening of the Birmingham Civil Rights Institute, an interpretive museum and research center, which adjoins the park to the west.

The park is the setting for several pieces of sculpture related to the civil rights movement.

There is a central fountain and commemorative statues of Dr. Martin Luther King Jr. and some of the other heroes of the civil rights movement, as well as three installations by artist James Drake which flank a circular "Freedom Walk". They bring the visitor inside the portrayals of terror and sorrow of the 1963 confrontations. A limestone sculpture by Raymond Kaskey installed in 1992 depicts three ministers, John Thomas Porter, Nelson H. Smith, and A. D. King, kneeling in prayer. A statue of Rev. Fred Suttlesworth by John Rhoden faces the park from in front of the Birmingham Civil Rights Institute, across the street.

The Four Spirits sculpture was unveiled at Kelly Ingram Park in September 2013 to commemorate the 50th anniversary of the 16th Street Baptist Church bombing. Crafted in Berkeley, California by Birmingham-born sculptor Elizabeth MacQueen and designed as a memorial to the four girls killed in the bombing (which occurred on September 15, 1963), it depicts the four girls in preparation for the church sermon at the 16th Street Baptist Church in the moments immediately before the explosion. The youngest girl killed in the explosion (Carol Denise McNair) is depicted releasing six doves into the air as she stands tiptoed and barefooted upon a bench as another barefooted girl (Addie Mae Collins) is depicted kneeling upon the bench, affixing a dress sash to McNair; a third girl (Cynthia Wesley) is depicted sitting upon the bench alongside McNair and Collins with a book in her lap. The book depicts the refrain of William Butler Yeats poem "The Stolen Child". The fourth girl (Carole Robertson) is depicted standing and smiling as she motions the other three girls to attend their church sermon. At the base of the sculpture is an inscription of the name of the sermon the four girls were to attend prior to the bombing—"A Love that Forgives." Oval photographs and brief biographies of the four girls killed in the explosion, the most seriously injured survivor (Sarah Collins), and the two teenage boys shot to death later that day also adorn the base of the sculpture.

Additional monuments honor Pauline Fletcher, Carrie A. Tuggle, Ruth Jackson, Arthur Shores, Julius Ellsberry, and the "foot soldiers" and other "unsung heroes" of the Civil Rights Movement.

The park hosts several local family festivals and cultural and entertainment events throughout the year. The Civil Rights Institute provides audio-tour guides for the park which feature remembrances by many of the figures directly involved in the confrontations. Urban Impact, Inc. also provides guided tours by appointment.

== See also ==
- List of national monuments of the United States
