= 16th Street Baptist Church =

Historic church in Alabama, United States

- U.S. National Register of Historic Places
- U.S. National Historic Landmark
- Alabama Register of Landmarks and Heritage
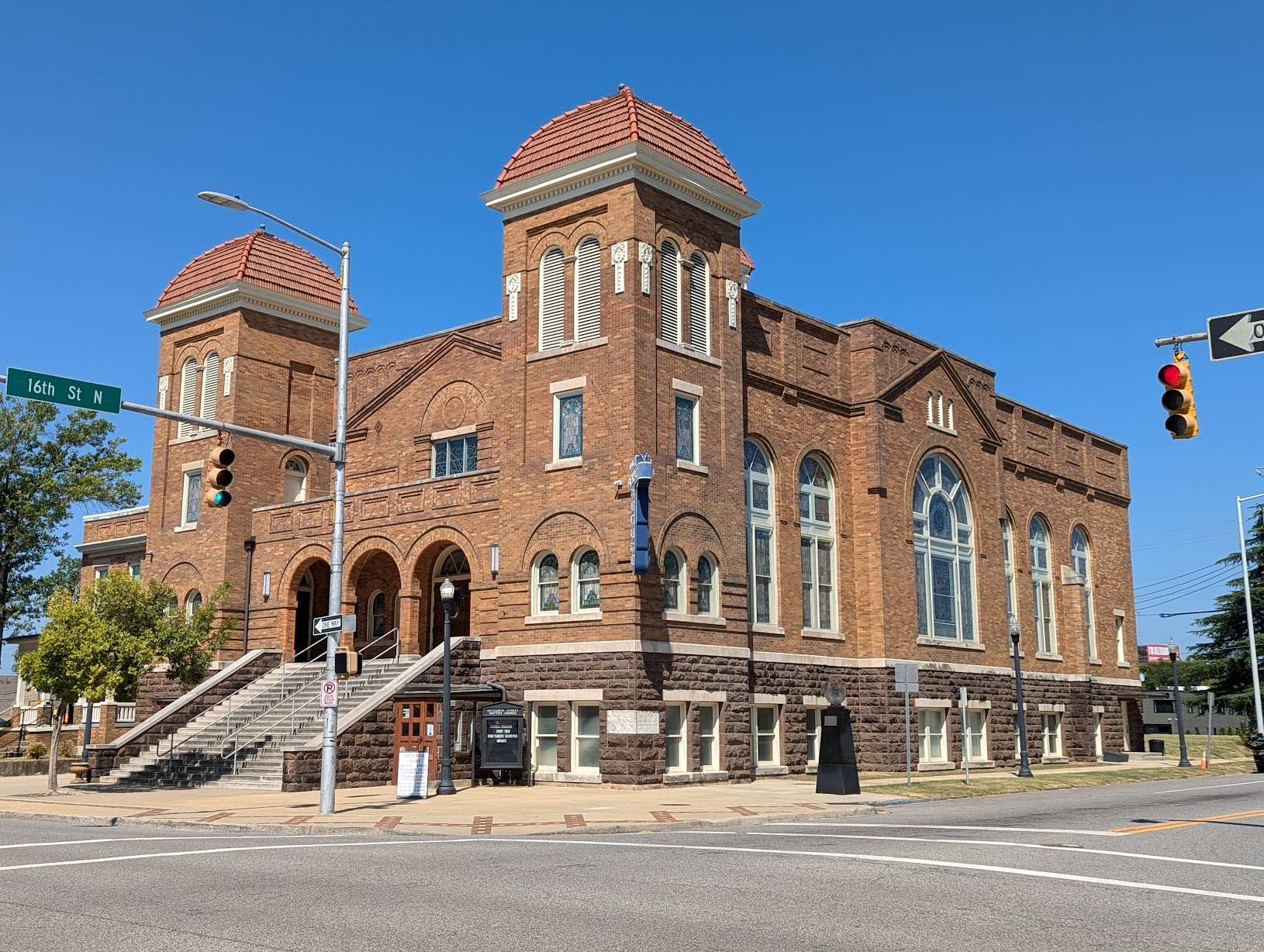
- 16th Street Baptist Church in August 2024

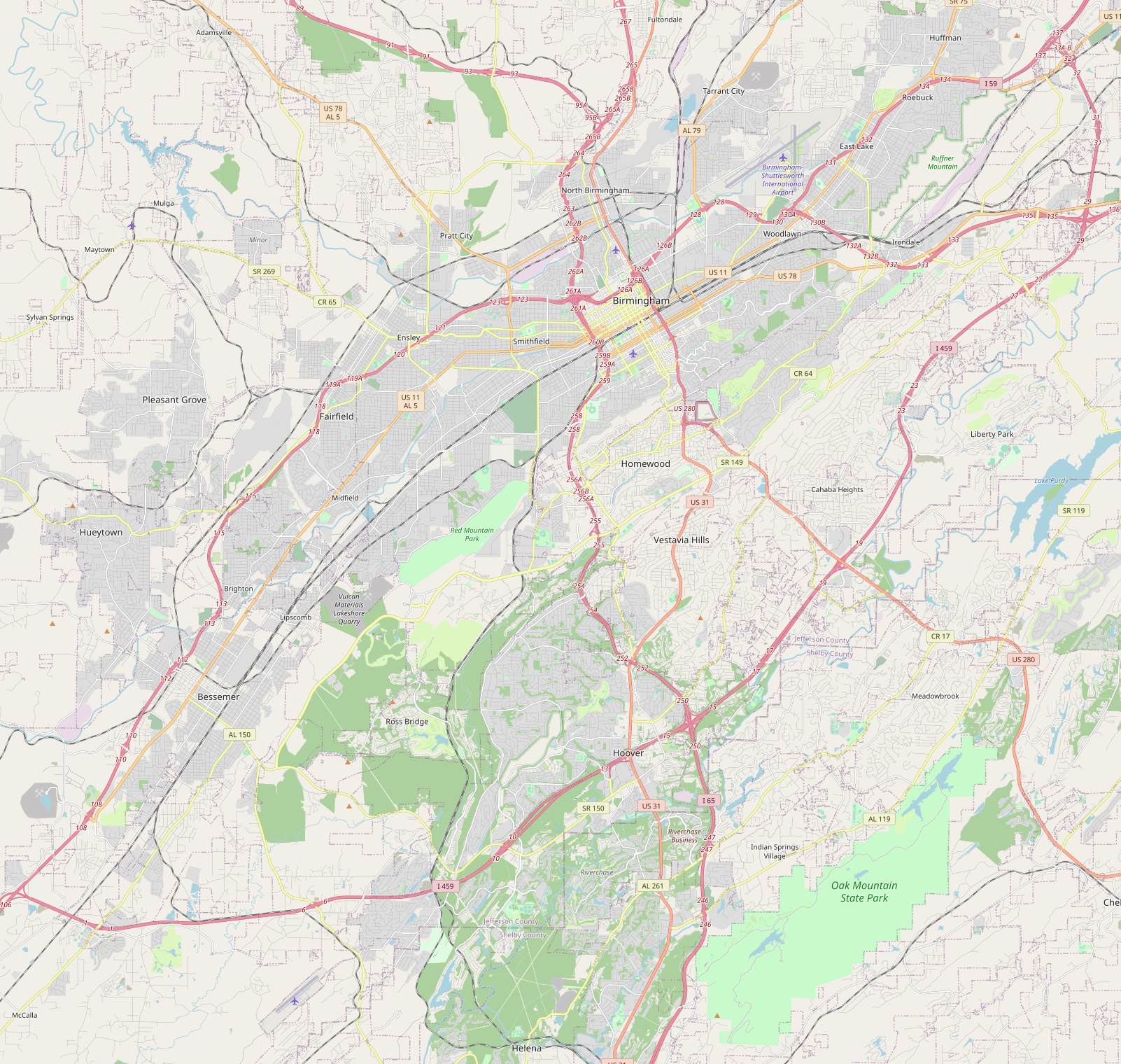
- Location within Birmingham, Alabama Location within Alabama Location within the United States
- Location: Birmingham, Alabama
- Coordinates: 33°31′00″N 86°48′54″W
- Built: 1911 / 1873
- Architect: Wallace Rayfield; Windham Bros. Construction Co.
- Architectural style: Romanesque
- NRHP reference No.: 80000696

Significant dates
- Added to NRHP: September 17, 1980
- Designated NHL: February 20, 2006
- Designated ARLH: June 16, 1976

The 16th Street Baptist Church is a Baptist church in Birmingham, Alabama, United States.

In 1963, the church was bombed by Ku Klux Klan members. The bombing killed four young girls in the midst of the Civil Rights Movement. The church is still in operation and is a central landmark in the Birmingham Civil Rights District. It was designated as a National Historic Landmark in 2006. Since 2008, it has also been on the UNESCO list of tentative World Heritage Sites.

== Beginnings ==
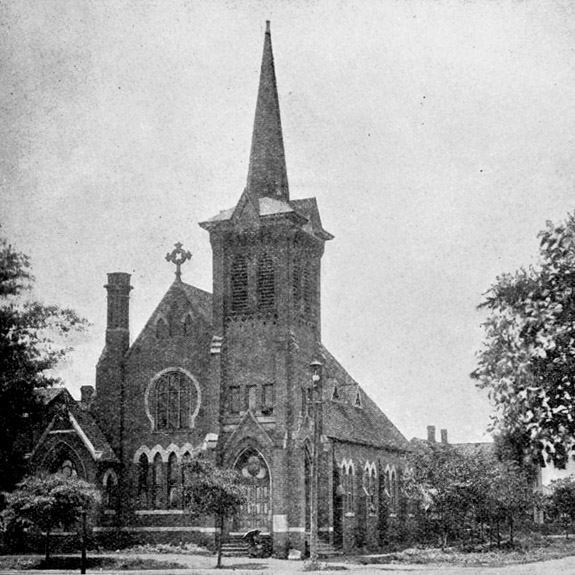
Building used by 16th Street Baptist Church from 1884 to 1908

The 16th Street Baptist Church was organized as the First Colored Baptist Church of Birmingham in 1873. It was the first black church to organize in Birmingham, which was founded just two years before. The first meetings were held in a small building at 12th Street and Fourth Avenue North. A site was soon acquired on 3rd Avenue North between 19th and 20th Street for a dedicated building. In 1880, the church sold that property and built a new church on the present site on 16th Street and 6th Avenue North. The new brick building was completed in 1884 under the supervision of its pastor, William R. Pettiford, but in 1908, the city condemned the structure and ordered it to be demolished. Pettiford was pastor from 1883 to 1904.

The present building, a "modified Romanesque and Byzantine design" by the prominent black architect Wallace Rayfield, was constructed in 1911 by the local black contractor T.C. Windham. The cost of construction was $26,000. In addition to the main sanctuary, the building houses a basement auditorium, used for meetings and lectures, and several ancillary rooms used for Sunday school and smaller groups.

As one of the primary institutions in the black community, the 16th Street Baptist Church has hosted prominent visitors throughout its history. W. E. B. Du Bois, Mary McLeod Bethune, Paul Robeson and Ralph Bunche all spoke at the church during the first part of the 20th century.

== Civil rights era and the 1963 bombing ==
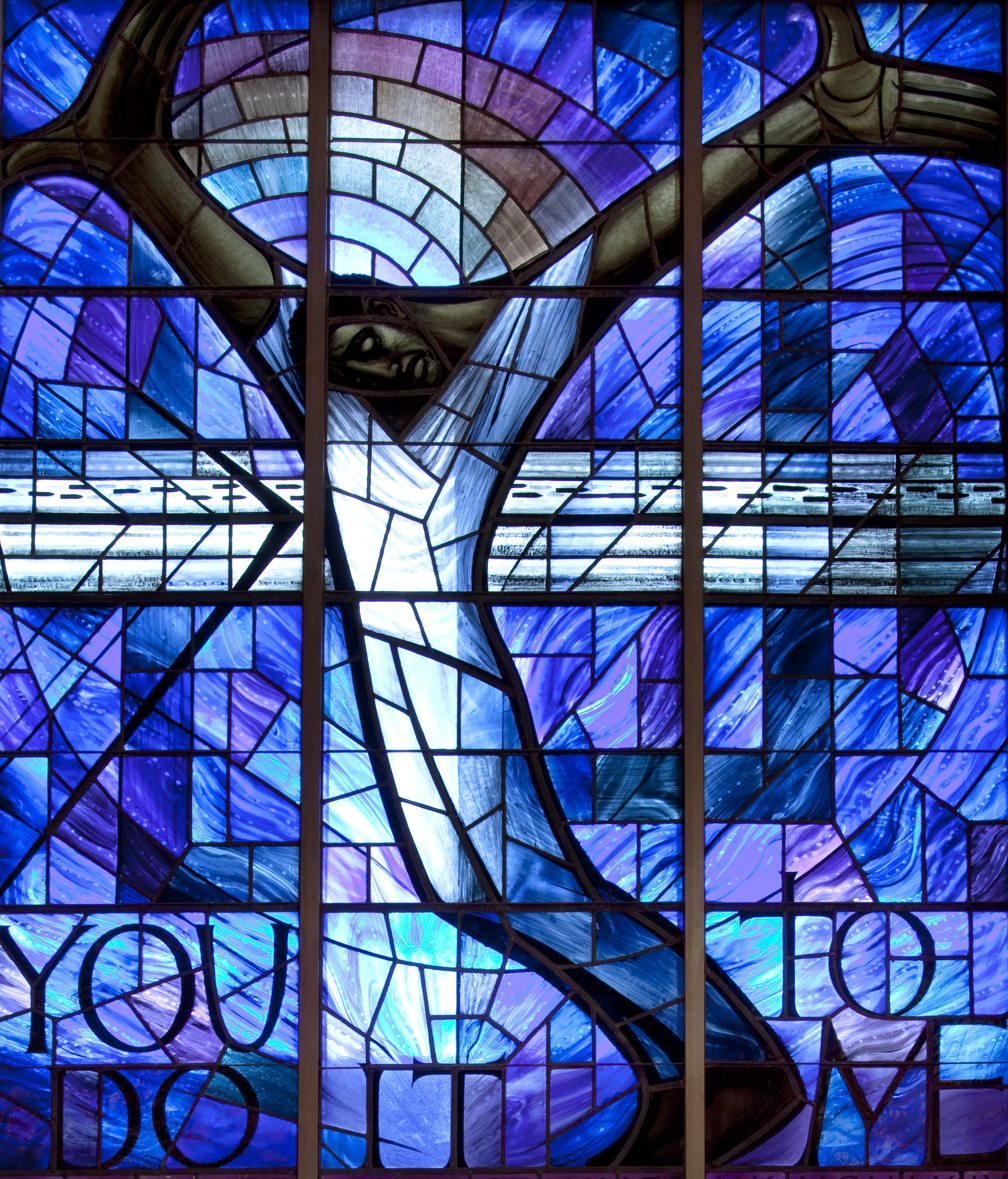
The Wales Window for Alabama donated by the people of Wales after the 1963 bombing of the church. The south-facing window was designed by Welsh artist John Petts and depicts a black Jesus with his arms outstretched. The right hand symbolizes oppression, his left is asking for forgiveness. The words "You do it to me" refer to the biblical parable of the sheep and the goats.

During the civil rights movement of the 1960s, the 16th Street Baptist Church served as an organizational headquarters, site of mass meetings and rallying point for African Americans protesting widespread institutionalized racism in Birmingham, Alabama, and the South. The ministers Fred Shuttlesworth, who was the chief local organizer, Southern Christian Leadership Conference (SCLC) leader Martin Luther King Jr., and SCLC leader James Bevel, who initiated the Children's Crusade and taught the students nonviolence, were frequent speakers at the church and led the movement.

On Sunday, September 15, 1963, Thomas Blanton, Bobby Frank Cherry and Robert Edward Chambliss, members of the Ku Klux Klan, planted 19 sticks of dynamite outside the basement of the church. At 10:22 a.m., they exploded, killing four young girls – Addie Mae Collins, Carole Robertson, Cynthia Wesley and Denise McNair. Twenty-two other victims suffered injuries. They were there preparing for the church's "Youth Day". A funeral for three of the four victims was attended by more than 8,000 mourners, white and black, but no city officials.

This was one of a string of more than 45 bombings within the decade. The neighborhood of Dynamite Hill was the most-frequently targeted area during this time. The bombing of the 16th Street Baptist Church increased Federal involvement in Alabama. President Johnson signed the 1964 Civil Rights Act into law the following year; and in 1965 the Voting Rights Act was passed, making literacy tests and poll taxes illegal.

=== Restoration ===
Following the bombing, more than $300,000 in unsolicited gifts were received by the church and repairs were begun immediately. The church reopened on June 7, 1964. A stained glass window depicting a black Jesus, designed by John Petts, was donated by citizens of Wales and installed in the front window, facing south.

== Current status ==
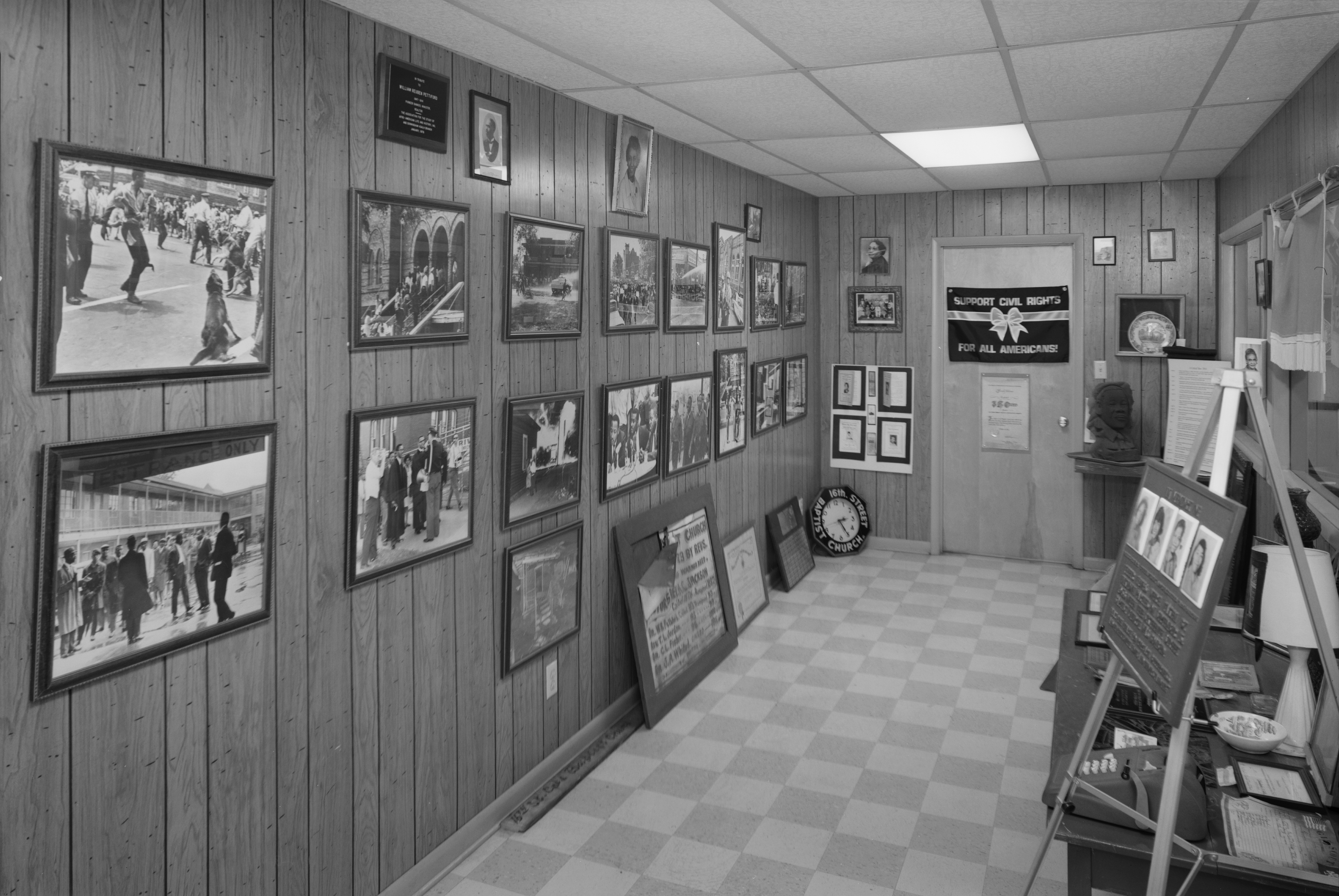
Basement exhibition at the 16th Street Baptist Church in Birmingham, Alabama, with pictures of the events of the Civil Rights Movement and the 1963 bombing of the church.

The church was added to the Alabama Register of Landmarks and Heritage on June 16, 1976. On September 17, 1980, it was added to the National Register of Historic Places. In 1993, a team of surveyors for the Historic American Buildings Survey executed archival quality measured drawings of the church for the Library of Congress. Because of its historic value on a national level in the moral crusade of civil rights, the church was officially designated a National Historic Landmark on February 20, 2006, by the United States Department of the Interior. On January 1, 2008, the US Government submitted it to UNESCO as part of an envisaged future World Heritage nomination and as such it is on UNESCO's tentative list of World Heritage Sites. In 2017, the church became part of the newly created Birmingham Civil Rights National Monument.

As part of the Birmingham Civil Rights District, the 16th Street Baptist Church receives more than 200,000 visitors annually. Though the current membership is only around 500, it has an average weekly attendance of nearly 2,000. The church also operates a large drug counseling program. The current pastor is the Reverend Arthur Price. Across from the church at Kelly Ingram Park is the Birmingham Civil Rights Institute, which plans events that teach and promote the history of human rights.

The 16th Street Baptist Church engaged in a $3 million restoration of the building in the first decade of the 21st century. Persistent water damage problems and exterior brick facing failure were addressed. The first phase of restoration, mainly below-grade waterproofing, was completed in 2007, followed by work on the exterior masonry. Additional funds were sought to handle unexpected problems uncovered during the work and to provide for ongoing physical maintenance.

== See also ==
- List of Baptist churches in Alabama
- List of National Historic Landmarks in Alabama
- List of national monuments of the United States
- Birmingham Civil Rights National Monument
