= Erskine Hawkins =

American trumpeter and big band leader (1914–1993)

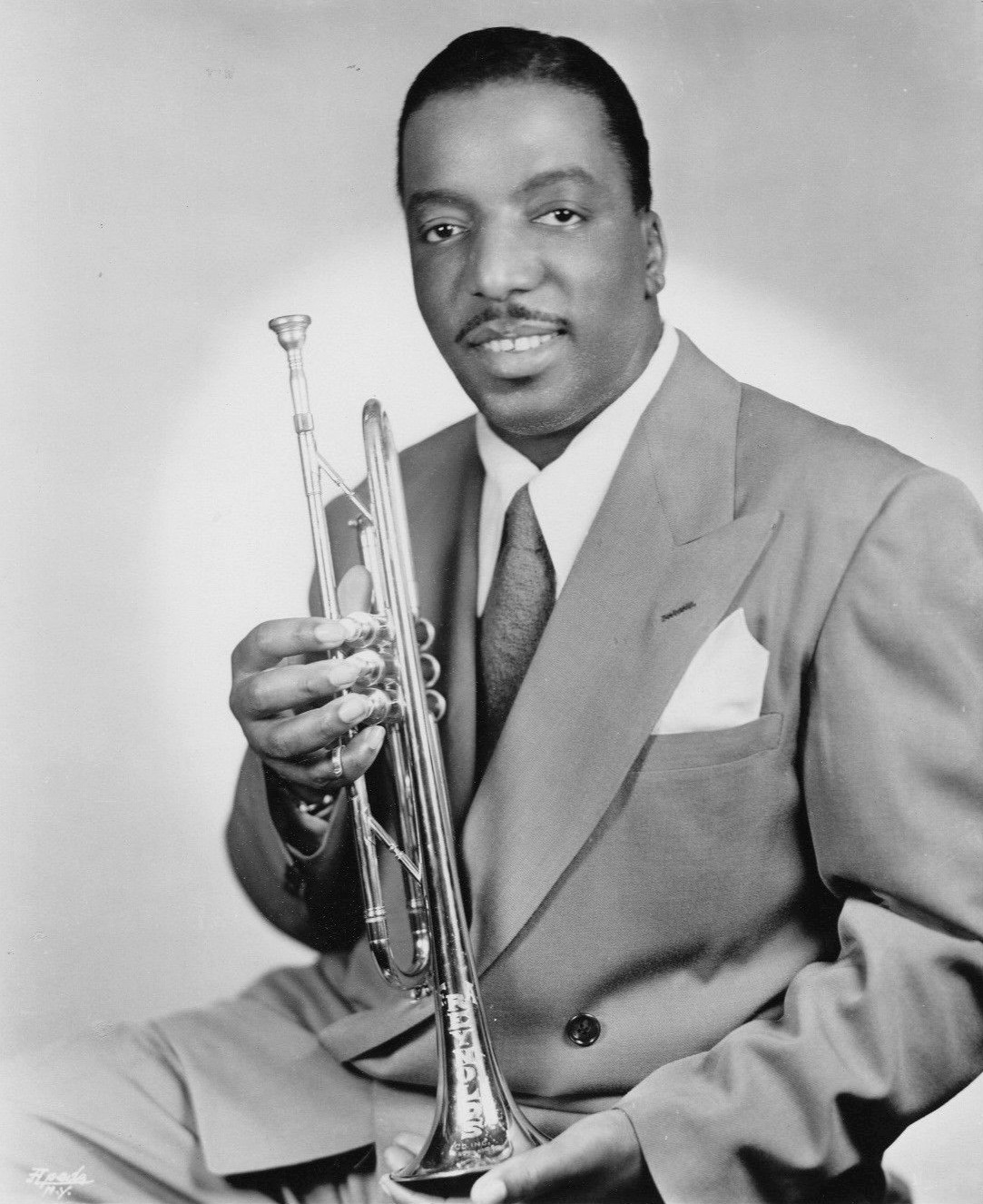
- Hawkins circa 1940s

Background information
- Born: Erskine Ramsay Hawkins; July 26, 1914; Birmingham, Alabama, U.S.
- Died: November 11, 1993 (aged 79) Willingboro Township, New Jersey, U.S.
- Genres: Jazz, blues
- Occupations: Musician, composer, bandleader
- Instrument: Trumpet
- Years active: 1930s–1980s
- Labels: Vocalion, RCA

Erskine Ramsay Hawkins (July 26, 1914 – November 11, 1993) was an American trumpeter and big band leader from Birmingham, Alabama, dubbed "The 20th Century Gabriel". He is best remembered for composing the jazz standard "Tuxedo Junction" (1939) with saxophonist and arranger Bill Johnson. The song became a top ten hit during World War II. Vocalists who were featured with Erskine's orchestra include Ida James, Delores Brown, and Della Reese. Hawkins was named after Alabama industrialist Erskine Ramsay.

== Early years ==
Erskine Hawkins was named by his parents after Alabama industrialist Erskine Ramsay who was rewarding parents with savings accounts for them for doing so. Hawkins attended Councill Elementary School and Industrial High School (now known as Parker High School) in Birmingham, Alabama. At Industrial High School, he played in the band directed by Fess Whatley, a teacher who taught many African-American musicians, many of whom worked with such musicians as Duke Ellington, Lucky Millinder, Louis Armstrong and Skitch Henderson (of the NBC Orchestra).

== Headliner years ==
During 1936 through 1938, Hawkins recorded for Vocalion Records as "Erskine Hawkins and his 'Bama State Collegians". In 1938, he signed with RCA Victor and began recording on their Bluebird label as, simply, "Erskine Hawkins and His Orchestra".

In the late 1930s, Hawkins and his Orchestra were one of the house bands at the Savoy Ballroom. They alternated with the Chick Webb band, and often used "Tuxedo Junction" as their sign-off song before the next band would take the stage, so that the dancing would continue uninterrupted. Hawkins also engaged in "battles of the bands" with such bandleaders as Glenn Miller, Duke Ellington, and Lionel Hampton.

In 1943, a Hawkins concert caused trouble in Little Rock, Arkansas: "3,000 Negroes jammed into the Exhibition Hall to dance to the music of Hawkins and his crew became unruly and began to push white police all over the floor. Police brandished their guns and blackjacks and attempted to quiet the crowd—but only after Hawkins and his boys broke into the national anthem did the dancers settle down." A city "ban on dances for Negroes" followed the event, meaning that "bookers of Negro orchestras for dances here may just as well take up another profession."

In the mid 1940s, he was transferred to the main RCA Victor label, recording many of his greatest hits for both labels during this decade. He remained with them until 1950 when he switched over to Coral Records. He continued to record for many years.

== Later years ==
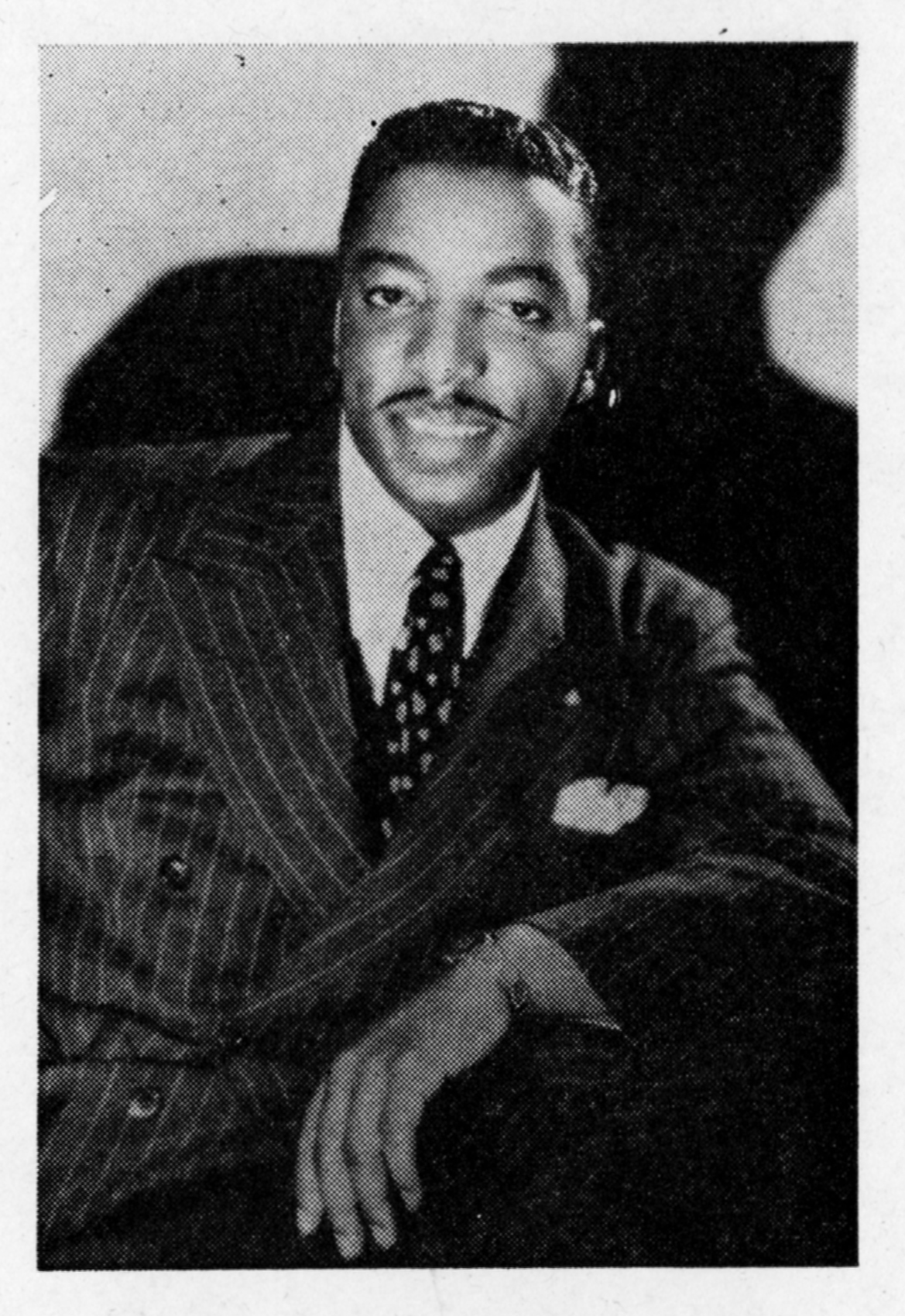
Erskine Hawkins

Hawkins was trumpeter and band leader in the lobby bar and show nightclub at The Concord Resort Hotel in Kiamesha Lake, New York, from 1967 to 1993 with his last performing group Joe Vitale (piano), Dudly Watson (bass), Sonny Rossi (vocals and clarinet), and George Leary (drums). Hawkins died at his home in Willingboro Township, New Jersey, in November 1993, at the age of 79. He is buried at Elmwood Cemetery and Mausoleum, alongside his sister, in Birmingham, Alabama.

== Personal life ==
Flo Hawkins, who appeared in the 1946 film That Man of Mine, was his wife. They eventually became estranged and she worked in The Catskills.

== Induction into the Alabama Jazz Hall of Fame ==
In 1978, Erskine Hawkins became one of the first five artists inducted into the Alabama Jazz Hall of Fame. In 1989, he was inducted into the Alabama Music Hall of Fame. Hawkins was a contemporary of another Birmingham jazz musician, Sun Ra.

== Chart singles ==
| Year | Single | Chart positions | |
| Year | Single | Pop | US R&B |
|---|---|---|---|
| 1936 | "Until the Real Thing Comes Along" | 20 | |
| 1936 | "Big John's Special" | 18 | |
| 1937 | "Way Down Upon the Swanee River" | 17 | |
| 1939 | "Do You Wanna Jump, Chillun?" | 16 | |
| 1939 | "Tuxedo Junction" | 7 | |
| 1940 | "Whispering Grass" | 13 | |
| 1940 | "Dolemite" | 10 | |
| 1940 | "Five O Clock Whistle" | 15 | |
| 1941 | "Song of the Wanderer" | 21 | |
| 1941 | "Nona" | 17 | |
| 1942 | "Wrap Your Troubles in Dreams" | 23 | |
| 1942 | "Bicycle Bounce" | 5 | |
| 1943 | "Don't Cry Baby" | 11 | 1 |
| 1944 | "Cherry" | 15 | 5 |
| 1945 | "Tippin' In" | 9 | 1 |
| 1945 | "Caldonia" | 12 | 2 |
| 1945 | "Fifteen Years (And I'm Still Serving Time)" | | 4 |
| 1946 | "Sneakin' Out" | | 5 |
| 1946 | "I've Got A Right to Cry" | | 2 |
| 1946 | "After Hours" | | 3 |
| 1947 | "Hawk's Boogie" | | 2 |
| 1948 | "Gabriel's Heater" | 28 | |
| 1949 | "Corn Bread" | | 8 |
| 1950 | "Tennessee Waltz" | | 6 |
