= Bill Hudson (photographer) =

American photojournalist (1932–2010)

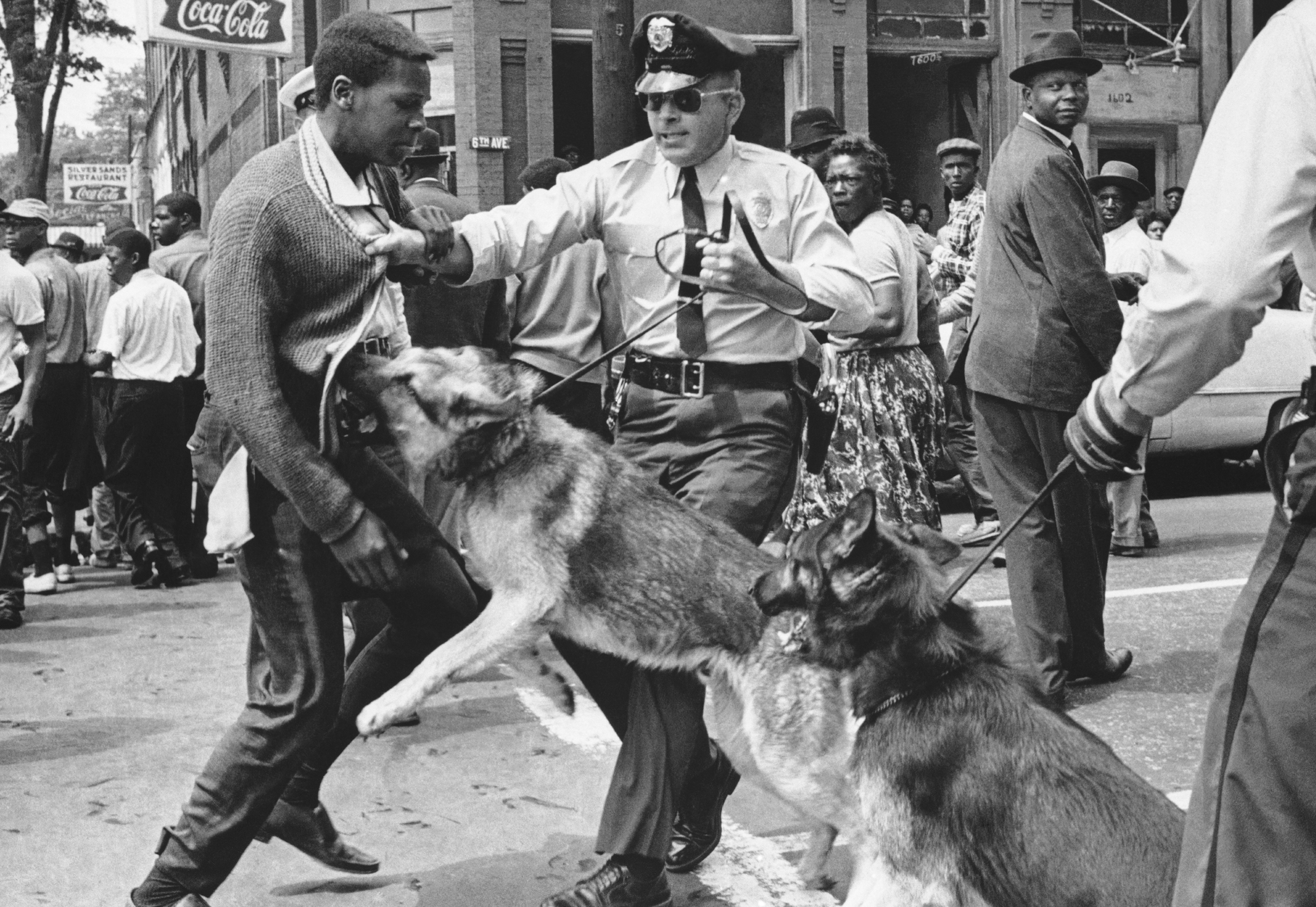
Bill Hudson's image of Parker High School student Walter Gadsden being attacked by dogs was published in The New York Times on May 4, 1963.

Bill Hudson (August 20, 1932 – June 24, 2010) was an American photojournalist for the Associated Press who was best known for his photographs taken in the Southern United States during the Civil Rights Movement. The depictions of police brutality against peaceful protesters that were seen in his widely published photographs helped push public support towards the goals of the civil rights movement.

William Marvin Hudson was born in Detroit on August 20, 1932. He began his career as a photographer in 1949 when he joined the United States Army during the Korean War. He became a sergeant. After leaving military service, he worked as a photographer at the Press-Register of Mobile, Alabama and The Chattanooga Times.

He was hired by the Memphis, Tennessee bureau of the Associated Press in 1962 and covered many widely reported events of the civil rights era, including protests — and the often-violent responses of the police — during the Birmingham campaign and in the Selma to Montgomery marches. His wife recounted that Hudson had been the target of bricks and rocks thrown at him by those who did not want him to photograph the African-American protests and the encounters they had with the police. Phil Sandlin, a competing photographer for UPI, described Hudson as "probably the most feared photographer that I had to work against because he was very, very good".

He took a photo on May 3, 1963, of Walter Gadsden, an African-American bystander who had been grabbed by a sunglasses-wearing police officer, while a German Shepherd lunged at his chest. The photo appeared above the fold, covering three columns in the next day's issue of The New York Times, as well as in other newspapers nationwide. Author Diane McWhorter wrote in her Pulitzer Prize-winning 2001 book Carry Me Home: Birmingham, Alabama, the Climactic Battle of the Civil Rights Revolution that Hudson's photo that day drove "international opinion to the side of the civil rights revolution".

Hudson joined United Press International in 1974.

A resident of Ponte Vedra Beach, Florida, Hudson died at Baptist Medical Center Beaches on June 24, 2010, at age 77 due to congestive heart failure. He was survived by his wife, Patricia.

== See also ==
- List of photographers of the civil rights movement
