= Birmingham campaign =

American civil rights campaign in Alabama (1963)

- Part of the Civil Rights Movement
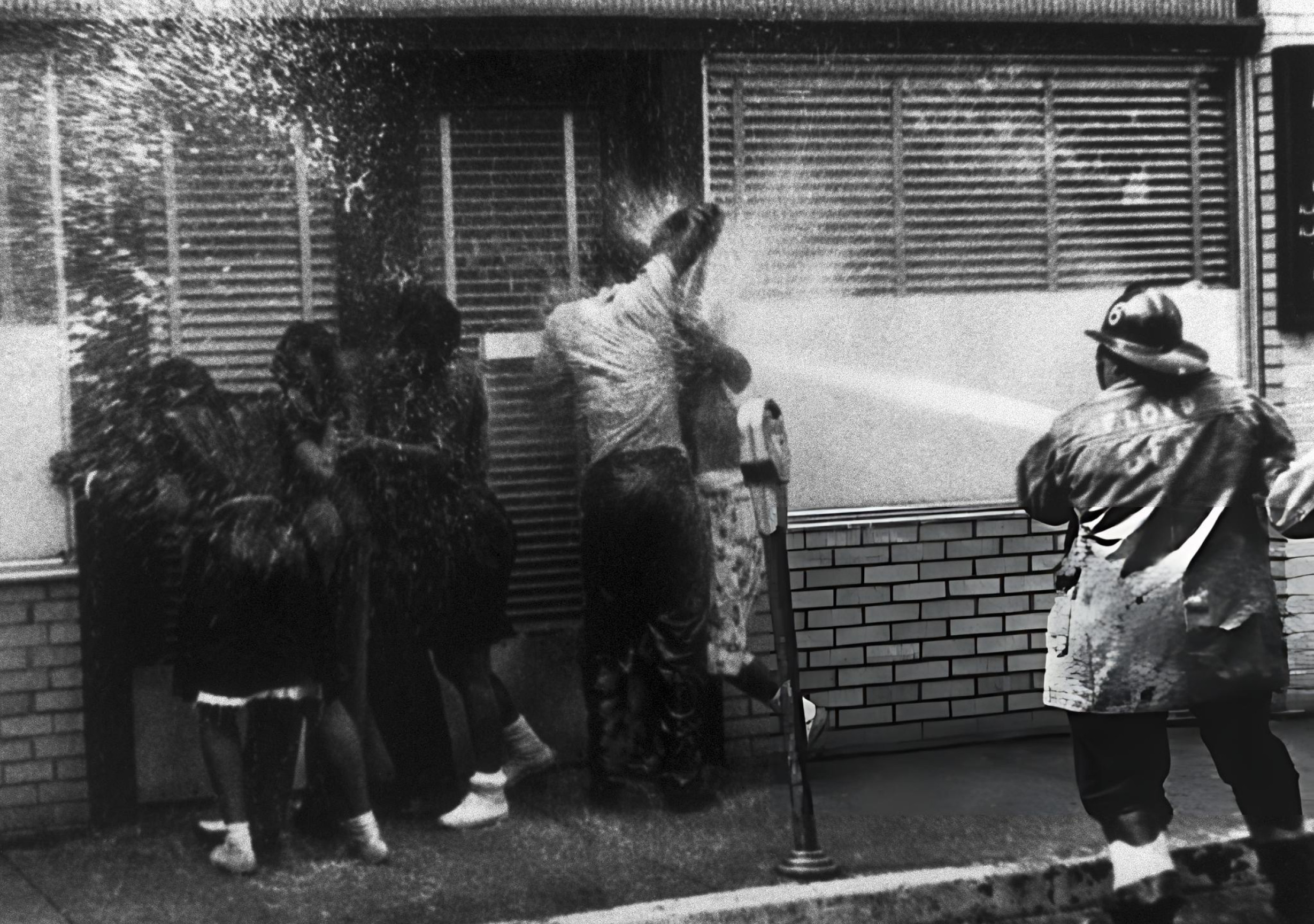
- High school students are hit by a high-pressure water jet from a fire hose during a peaceful walk in Birmingham, Alabama in 1963.
- Date: April 3 – May 10, 1963
- Location: Birmingham, Alabama and Kelly Ingram Park
- Result: Mass demonstrations throughout United States; Civil Rights Address delivered by John F. Kennedy; March on Washington for Jobs and Freedom; Civil Rights Act of 1964; Martin Luther King Jr. writes "Letter from Birmingham Jail"; Increased attention towards racial segregation in southern United States; Martin Luther King Jr.'s reputation elevated; Bull Connor ousted from his public office; Desegregation in Birmingham

Parties
Alabama Christian Movement for Human Rights (ACMHR); Southern Christian Leadership Conference (SCLC)	City Commission of Birmingham; Birmingham Police Department; Birmingham Fire Department; Birmingham Chamber of Commerce; Ku Klux Klan

Lead figures
ACMHR member; Rev. Fred Shuttlesworth; SCLC members; Martin Luther King Jr.; James Bevel; Wyatt Tee Walker; Dorothy Cotton	Mayors; Art Hanes (1961–1963); Albert Boutwell (1963–1967); Commissioner of Public Safety; Bull Connor; Commissioner of Public Improvements; J. T. Waggoner Sr.; President of Chamber of Commerce; Sid Smyer

The Birmingham campaign, also known as the Birmingham movement or Birmingham confrontation, was an American movement organized in early 1963 by the Southern Christian Leadership Conference to bring attention to the integration efforts of African Americans in Birmingham, Alabama.

Led by Martin Luther King Jr., James Bevel, Fred Shuttlesworth and others, the campaign of nonviolent direct action culminated in the 1963 Children's Crusade, widely publicized confrontations between young black students marching peacefully to City Hall to talk to the Mayor and white civic authorities, who stopped them with force, dogs, and fire hoses. These events led the municipal government to change the city's discrimination laws and the federal government to began the process of drafting the 1964 Civil Rights Act.

In the early 1960s, Birmingham was one of the most racially divided cities in the United States, enforced both legally and culturally. Black citizens faced legal and economic disparities, and violent retribution when they attempted to draw attention to their problems. Martin Luther King Jr. called it the most segregated city in the country. Protests in Birmingham began with a boycott led by Shuttlesworth meant to pressure business leaders to open employment to people of all races, and end segregation in public facilities, restaurants, schools, and stores. When local business and governmental leaders resisted the boycott, the SCLC agreed to assist. Organizer Wyatt Tee Walker joined Birmingham activist Shuttlesworth and began what they called Project C, a series of sit-ins and marches intended to provoke mass arrests.

When the campaign ran low on adult volunteers, James Bevel thought of the idea of having students become the main demonstrators in the Birmingham campaign. He then trained and directed high school, college, and elementary school students in nonviolence, and asked them to participate in the demonstrations by taking a peaceful walk 50 at a time from the 16th Street Baptist Church to City Hall in order to talk to the mayor about segregation. This resulted in over a thousand arrests, and, as the jails and holding areas filled with arrested students, the Birmingham Police Department, at the direction of the city Commissioner of Public Safety, Eugene "Bull" Connor, used high-pressure water hoses and police attack dogs on the children and adult bystanders. Not all of the bystanders were peaceful, despite the avowed intentions of SCLC to hold a completely nonviolent walk, but the students held to the nonviolent premise. Martin Luther King Jr. and the SCLC drew both criticism and praise for allowing children to participate and put themselves in harm's way.

The Birmingham campaign was a model of nonviolent direct action protest and, through the media, drew the world's attention to racial segregation in the South. It burnished King's reputation, ousted Connor from his job, obtained desegregation in Birmingham, and directly paved the way for the Civil Rights Act of 1964, which prohibited racial discrimination in hiring practices and public services throughout the United States.

== Background ==
=== City of segregation ===
Birmingham, Alabama was, in 1963, "probably the most thoroughly segregated city in the United States", according to King. Although the city's population of almost 350,000 was 60% white and 40% black, Birmingham had no black police officers, firefighters, sales clerks in department stores, bus drivers, bank tellers, or store cashiers. Black secretaries could not work for white professionals. Jobs available to black workers were limited to manual labor in Birmingham's steel mills, work in household service and yard maintenance, or work in black neighborhoods. When layoffs were necessary, black employees were often the first to go. The unemployment rate for black people was two and a half times higher than for white people. The average income for black employees in the city was less than half that of white employees. Significantly lower pay scales for black workers at the local steel mills were common. Racial segregation of public and commercial facilities throughout Jefferson County was legally required, covered all aspects of life, and was rigidly enforced. Only 10 percent of the city's black population was registered to vote in 1960.

In addition, Birmingham's economy was stagnating as the city was shifting from blue collar to white collar jobs. According to Time magazine in 1958, the only thing white workers had to gain from desegregation was more competition from black workers. Fifty unsolved racially motivated bombings between 1945 and 1962 had earned the city the nickname "Bombingham". A neighborhood shared by white and black families experienced so many attacks that it was called "Dynamite Hill". Black churches in which civil rights were discussed became specific targets for attack.

Black organizers had worked in Birmingham for about ten years, as it was the headquarters of the Southern Negro Youth Congress (SNYC). In Birmingham, SNYC experienced both successes and failures, as well as arrests and official violence. SNYC was forced out in 1949, leaving behind a Black population that thus had some experience of civil rights organizing. A few years later, Birmingham's black population began to organize to effect change. After Alabama banned the National Association for the Advancement of Colored People (NAACP) in 1956, Reverend Fred Shuttlesworth formed the Alabama Christian Movement for Human Rights (ACMHR) the same year to challenge the city's segregation policies through lawsuits and protests. When the courts overturned the segregation of the city's parks, the city responded by closing them. Shuttlesworth's home was repeatedly bombed, as was Bethel Baptist Church, where he was pastor. After Shuttlesworth was arrested and jailed for violating the city's segregation rules in 1962, he sent a petition to Mayor Art Hanes' office asking that public facilities be desegregated. Hanes responded with a letter informing Shuttlesworth that his petition had been thrown in the garbage. Looking for outside help, Shuttlesworth invited Martin Luther King Jr. and the SCLC to Birmingham, saying, "If you come to Birmingham, you will not only gain prestige, but really shake the country. If you win in Birmingham, as Birmingham goes, so goes the nation."

=== Campaign goals ===
King of the SCLC had recently been involved in a campaign to desegregate the city of Albany, Georgia, but did not see the results they had anticipated. Described by historian Henry Hampton as a "morass", the Albany Movement lost momentum and stalled. King's reputation had been hurt by the Albany campaign, and he was eager to improve it. Determined not to make the same mistakes in Birmingham, King and the SCLC changed several of their strategies. In Albany, they concentrated on the desegregation of the city as a whole. In Birmingham, their campaign tactics focused on more narrowly defined goals for the downtown shopping and government district. These goals included the desegregation of Birmingham's downtown stores, fair hiring practices in shops and city employment, the reopening of public parks, and the creation of a bi-racial committee to oversee the desegregation of Birmingham's public schools. King summarized the philosophy of the Birmingham campaign when he said: "The purpose of ... direct action is to create a situation so crisis-packed that it will inevitably open the door to negotiation".

=== Commissioner of Public Safety ===
A significant factor in the success of the Birmingham campaign was the structure of the city government and the personality of its contentious Commissioner of Public Safety, Eugene "Bull" Connor. Described as an "arch-segregationist" by Time magazine, Connor asserted that the city "ain't gonna segregate no niggers and whites together in this town [sic]". He also claimed that the Civil Rights Movement was a Communist plot, and after the churches were bombed, Connor blamed the violence on local black citizens. Birmingham's government was set up in such a way that it gave Connor powerful influence. In 1958, police arrested ministers organizing a bus boycott. When the Federal Bureau of Investigation (FBI) initiated a probe amid allegations of police misconduct for the arrests, Connor responded that he "[hadn't] got any damn apology to the FBI or anybody else", and predicted, "If the North keeps trying to cram this thing [desegregation] down our throats, there's going to be bloodshed." In 1961, Connor delayed sending police to intervene when Freedom Riders were beaten by local mobs. The police harassed religious leaders and protest organizers by ticketing cars parked at mass meetings and entering the meetings in plainclothes to take notes. The Birmingham Fire Department interrupted such meetings to search for "phantom fire hazards". Connor was so antagonistic towards the Civil Rights Movement that his actions galvanized support for black Americans. President John F. Kennedy later said of him, "The Civil Rights Movement should thank God for Bull Connor. He's helped it as much as Abraham Lincoln."

Turmoil in the mayor's office also weakened the Birmingham city government in its opposition to the campaign. Connor, who had run for several elected offices in the months leading up to the campaign, had lost all but the race for Public Safety Commissioner. Because they believed Connor's extreme conservatism slowed progress for the city as a whole, a group of white political moderates worked to defeat him. The Citizens for Progress was backed by the Chamber of Commerce and other white professionals in the city, and their tactics were successful. In November 1962, Connor lost the race for mayor to Albert Boutwell, a less combative segregationist. However, Connor and his colleagues on the City Commission refused to accept the new mayor's authority. They claimed on a technicality that their terms not expire until 1965 instead of in the spring of 1963. So for a brief time, Birmingham had two city governments attempting to conduct business.

== Focus on Birmingham ==
=== Selective buying campaign ===
Modeled on the Montgomery bus boycott, protest actions in Birmingham began in 1962, when students from local colleges arranged for a year of staggered boycotts. They caused downtown business to decline by as much as 40 percent, which attracted attention from Chamber of Commerce president Sidney Smyer, who commented that the "racial incidents have given us a black eye that we'll be a long time trying to forget". In response to the boycott, the City Commission of Birmingham punished the black community by withdrawing $45,000 ($480,000 in 2025) from a surplus-food program used primarily by low-income black families. The result, however, was a black community more motivated to resist.

The SCLC decided that economic pressure on Birmingham businesses would be more effective than pressure on politicians, a lesson learned in Albany as few black citizens were registered to vote in 1962. In the spring of 1963, before Easter, the Birmingham boycott intensified during the second-busiest shopping season of the year. Pastors urged their congregations to avoid shopping in Birmingham stores in the downtown district. For six weeks supporters of the boycott patrolled the downtown area to make sure black shoppers were not patronizing stores that promoted or tolerated segregation. If black shoppers were found in these stores, organizers confronted them and shamed them into participating in the boycott. Shuttlesworth recalled a woman whose $15 hat ($160 in 2025) was destroyed by boycott enforcers. Campaign participant Joe Dickson recalled, "We had to go under strict surveillance. We had to tell people, say look: if you go downtown and buy something, you're going to have to answer to us." After several business owners in Birmingham took down "white only" and "colored only" signs, Commissioner Connor told business owners that if they did not obey the segregation ordinances, they would lose their business licenses.

=== Project C ===
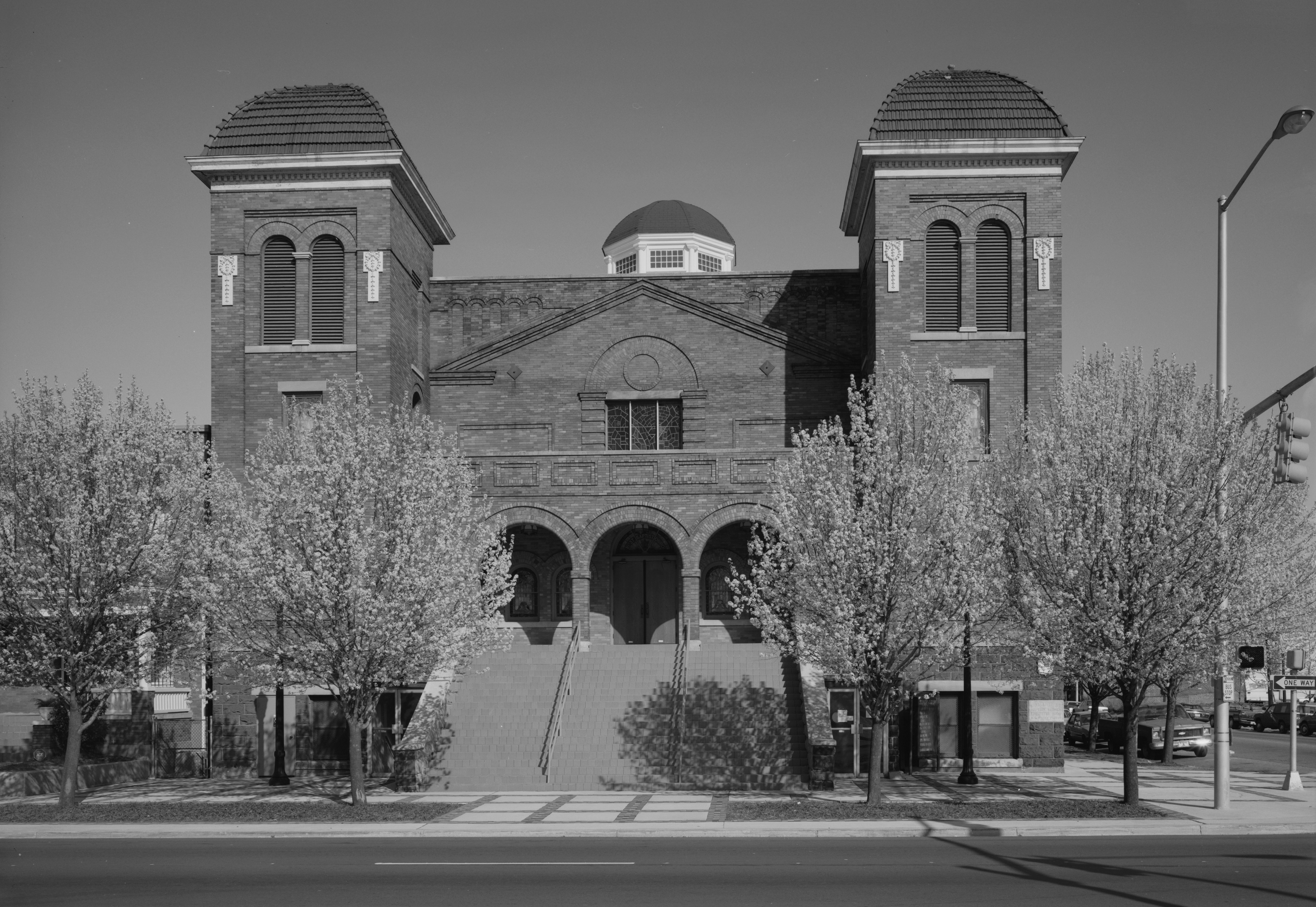
The 16th Street Baptist Church, headquarters and rendezvous point for the campaign

Martin Luther King Jr.'s presence in Birmingham was not welcomed by all in the black community. A local black attorney complained in Time that the new city administration did not have enough time to confer with the various groups invested in changing the city's segregation policies. Black hotel owner A. G. Gaston agreed. A white Jesuit priest assisting in desegregation negotiations attested the "demonstrations [were] poorly timed and misdirected."

Protest organizers knew they would meet with violence from the Birmingham Police Department and chose a confrontational approach to get the attention of the federal government. Wyatt Tee Walker, one of the SCLC founders and the executive director from 1960 to 1964, planned the tactics of the direct action protests, specifically targeting Bull Connor's tendency to react to demonstrations with violence: "My theory was that if we mounted a strong nonviolent movement, the opposition would surely do something to attract the media, and in turn induce national sympathy and attention to the everyday segregated circumstance of a person living in the Deep South." He headed the planning of what he called Project C, which stood for "confrontation". Organizers believed their phones were tapped, so to prevent their plans from being leaked and perhaps influencing the mayoral election, they used code words for demonstrations.

The plan called for direct nonviolent action to attract media attention to "the biggest and baddest city of the South". In preparation for the protests, Walker timed the walking distance from the 16th Street Baptist Church, headquarters for the campaign, to the downtown area. He surveyed the segregated lunch counters of department stores, and listed federal buildings as secondary targets should police block the protesters' entrance into primary targets such as stores, libraries, and all-white churches.

==== Methods ====
The campaign used a variety of nonviolent methods of confrontation, including sit-ins at libraries and lunch counters, kneel-ins by black visitors at white churches, and a march to the county building to mark the beginning of a voter-registration drive. Most businesses responded by refusing to serve demonstrators. Some white spectators at a sit-in at a Woolworth's lunch counter spat upon the participants. A few hundred protesters, including jazz musician Al Hibbler, were arrested, although Hibbler was immediately released by Connor.

The SCLC's goals were to fill the jails with protesters to force the city government to negotiate as demonstrations continued. However, not enough people were arrested to affect the functioning of the city and the wisdom of the plans were being questioned in the black community. The editor of The Birmingham World, the city's black newspaper, called the direct actions by the demonstrators "wasteful and worthless", and urged black citizens to use the courts to change the city's racist policies. Most white residents of Birmingham expressed shock at the demonstrations. White religious leaders denounced King and the other organizers, saying that "a cause should be pressed in the courts and the negotiations among local leaders, and not in the streets". Some white Birmingham residents were supportive as the boycott continued. When one black woman entered Loveman's department store to buy her children Easter shoes, a white saleswoman said to her, "Negro, ain't you ashamed of yourself, your people out there on the street getting put in jail and you in here spending money and I'm not going to sell you any, you'll have to go some other place." King promised a protest every day until "peaceful equality had been assured" and expressed doubt that the new mayor would ever voluntarily desegregate the city.

==== City reaction ====
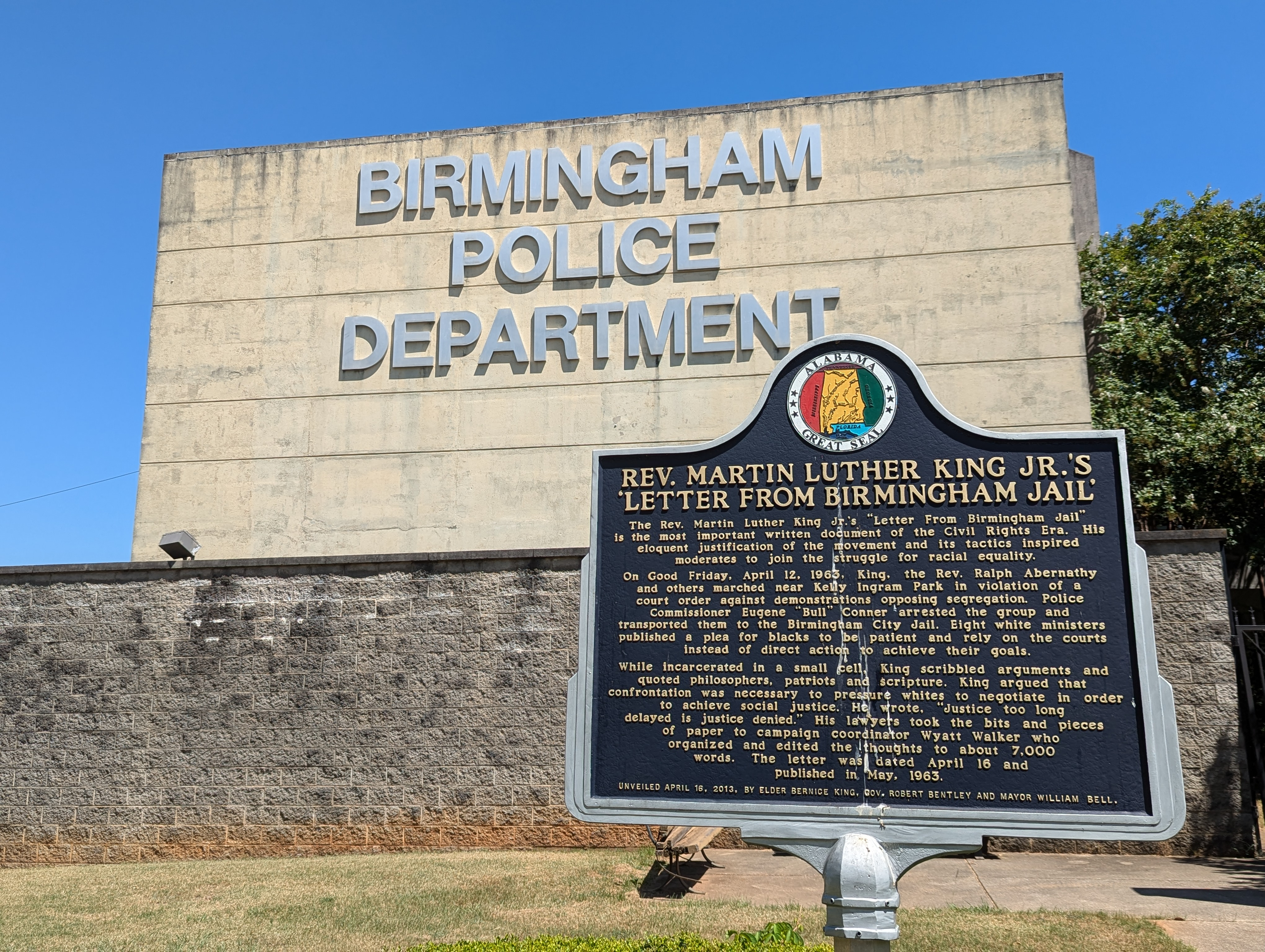
The Birmingham Police Department building where Martin Luther King, Jr. was jailed. The historic marker in the foreground, erected by the Alabama Historical Society, details his incarceration and the writing of "Letter from Birmingham Jail".

On April 10, 1963, Bull Connor obtained an injunction barring the protests and subsequently raised bail bond for those arrested from $200 to $1,500 ($2,000 to $16,000 in 2025). Fred Shuttlesworth called the injunction a "flagrant denial of our constitutional rights" and organizers prepared to defy the order. The decision to ignore the injunction had been made during the planning stage of the campaign. King and the SCLC had obeyed court injunctions in their Albany protests and reasoned that obeying them contributed to the Albany campaign's lack of success. In a press release they explained, "We are now confronted with recalcitrant forces in the Deep South that will use the courts to perpetuate the unjust and illegal systems of racial separation". Incoming mayor Albert Boutwell called King and the SCLC organizers "strangers" whose only purpose in Birmingham was "to stir inter-racial discord". Connor promised, "You can rest assured that I will fill the jail full of any persons violating the law as long as I'm at City Hall."

The movement organizers found themselves out of money after the amount of required bail was raised. Because King was the major fundraiser, his associates urged him to travel the country to raise bail money for those arrested. He had, however, previously promised to lead the marchers to jail in solidarity, but hesitated as the planned date arrived. Some SCLC members grew frustrated with his indecisiveness. "I have never seen Martin so troubled", one of King's friends later said. After King prayed and reflected alone in his hotel room, he and the campaign leaders decided to defy the injunction and prepared for mass arrests of campaign supporters. To build morale and to recruit volunteers to go to jail, Ralph Abernathy spoke at a mass meeting of Birmingham's black citizens at the 6th Avenue Baptist Church: "The eyes of the world are on Birmingham tonight. Bobby Kennedy is looking here at Birmingham, the United States Congress is looking at Birmingham. The Department of Justice is looking at Birmingham. Are you ready, are you ready to make the challenge? I am ready to go to jail, are you?" With Abernathy, King was among 50 Birmingham residents ranging in age from 15 to 81 years who were arrested on Good Friday, April 12, 1963. It was King's 13th arrest.

=== Martin Luther King Jr. jailed ===
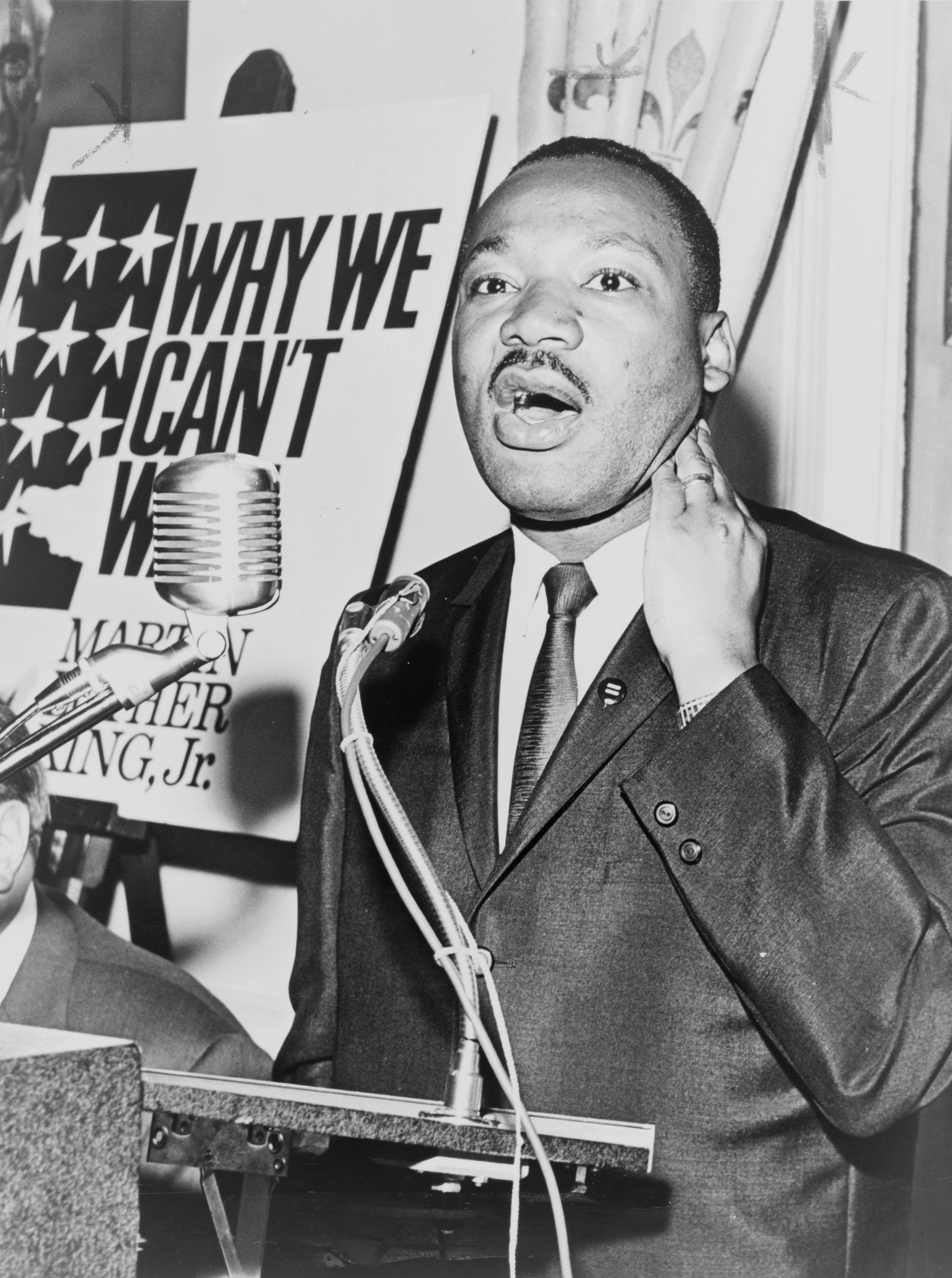
Martin Luther King Jr., a year later in 1964, promoting the book Why We Can't Wait, based on his "Letter from Birmingham Jail"

Martin Luther King Jr. was held in the Birmingham jail and was denied a consultation with an attorney from the NAACP without guards present. When historian Jonathan Bass wrote of the incident in 2001, he noted that news of King's incarceration was spread quickly by Wyatt Tee Walker, as planned. King's supporters sent telegrams about his arrest to the White House. He could have been released on bail at any time, and jail administrators wished him to be released as soon as possible to avoid the media attention while King was in custody. However, campaign organizers offered no bail in order "to focus the attention of the media and national public opinion on the Birmingham situation".

Twenty-four hours after his arrest, King was allowed to see local attorneys from the SCLC. When Coretta Scott King did not hear from her husband, she called Walker and he suggested that she call President Kennedy directly. Mrs. King was recuperating at home after the birth of their fourth child when she received a call from President Kennedy the Monday after the arrest. The president told her she could expect a call from her husband soon. When Martin Luther King Jr. called his wife, their conversation was brief and guarded; he correctly assumed that his phones were tapped. Several days later, Jacqueline Kennedy called Coretta Scott King to express her concern for King while he was incarcerated.

Using scraps of paper given to him by a janitor, notes written on the margins of a newspaper, and later a legal pad given to him by SCLC attorneys, King wrote his essay "Letter from Birmingham Jail". It responded to eight politically moderate white clergymen who accused King of agitating local residents and not giving the incoming mayor a chance to make any changes. The essay was a culmination of many of King's ideas, which he had touched on in earlier writings. King's arrest attracted national attention, including that of corporate officers of retail chains with stores in downtown Birmingham. After King's arrest, the chains' profits began to erode. National business owners pressed the Kennedy administration to intervene. King was released on April 20, 1963.

== Conflict escalation ==
=== Recruiting students ===
Despite the publicity surrounding King's arrest, the campaign was faltering because few demonstrators were willing to risk arrest. In addition, although Connor had used police dogs to assist in the arrest of demonstrators, this did not attract the media attention that organizers had hoped for. To re-energize the campaign, SCLC organizer James Bevel devised a controversial alternative plan he named D Day that was later called the "Children's Crusade" by Newsweek magazine. D Day called for students from Birmingham elementary schools and high schools as well as nearby Miles College to take part in the demonstrations.

Bevel, a veteran of earlier nonviolent student protests with the Nashville Student Movement and SNCC, had been named SCLC's Director of Direct Action and Nonviolent Education. After initiating the idea he organized and educated the students in nonviolence tactics and philosophy. King hesitated to approve the use of children, but Bevel believed that children were appropriate for the demonstrations because jail time for them would not hurt families economically as much as the loss of a working parent. He also saw that adults in the black community were divided about how much support to give the protests. Bevel and the organizers knew that high school students were a more cohesive group; they had been together as classmates since kindergarten. He recruited girls who were school leaders and boys who were athletes. Bevel found girls more receptive to his ideas because they had less experience as victims of white violence. When the girls joined, however, the boys were close behind.

Bevel and the SCLC held workshops to help students overcome their fear of dogs and jails. They showed films of the Nashville sit-ins organized in 1960 to end segregation at public lunch counters. Birmingham's black radio station, WENN, supported the new plan by telling students to arrive at the demonstration meeting place with a toothbrush to be used in jail. Flyers were distributed in black schools and neighborhoods that said, "Fight for freedom first then go to school" and "It's up to you to free our teachers, our parents, yourself, and our country."

=== Children's Crusade ===
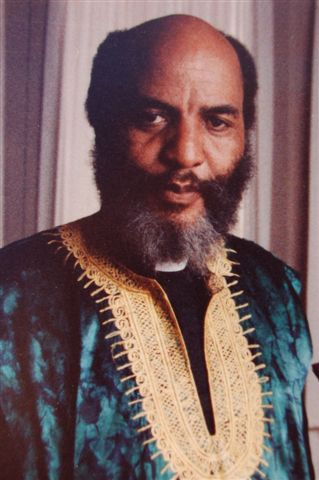
James Bevel, who was soon to become SCLC's Director of Direct Action and Director of Nonviolent Education, initiated and organized the Birmingham Children's Crusade

On May 2, 1963, 7th grader Gwendolyn Sanders helped organize her classmates, and hundreds of children from high schoolers down to first graders who joined her in a massive walkout defying the principal of Parker High School who attempted to lock the gates to keep students inside. Demonstrators were given instructions to march to the downtown area, to meet with the Mayor, and integrate the chosen buildings. They were to leave in smaller groups and continue on their courses until arrested. Marching in disciplined ranks, some of them using walkie-talkies, they were sent at timed intervals from various churches to the downtown business area. More than 600 students were arrested; the youngest of these was reported to be eight years old. Children left the churches while singing hymns and "freedom songs" such as "We Shall Overcome". They clapped and laughed while being arrested and awaiting transport to jail. The mood was compared to that of a school picnic. Although Bevel informed Connor that the march was to take place, Connor and the police were dumbfounded by the numbers and behavior of the children. They assembled paddy wagons and school buses to take the children to jail. When no squad cars were left to block the city streets, Connor, whose authority extended to the fire department, used fire trucks. The day's arrests brought the total number of jailed protesters to 1,200 in the 900-capacity Birmingham jail.

Some considered the use of children controversial, including incoming Birmingham mayor Albert Boutwell and Attorney General Robert F. Kennedy, who condemned the decision to use children in the protests. Kennedy was reported in The New York Times as saying, "an injured, maimed, or dead child is a price that none of us can afford to pay", although adding, "I believe that everyone understands their just grievances must be resolved." Malcolm X criticized the decision, saying, "Real men don't put their children on the firing line."

King, who had been silent and then out of town while Bevel was organizing the children, was impressed by the success of the children's protests. That evening he declared at a mass meeting, "I have been inspired and moved by today. I have never seen anything like it." Although Wyatt Tee Walker was initially against the use of children in the demonstrations, he responded to criticism by saying, "Negro children will get a better education in five days in jail than in five months in a segregated school." The D Day campaign received front page coverage by The Washington Post and The New York Times.

=== Fire hoses and police dogs ===
When Connor realized that the Birmingham jail was full, on May 3 he changed police tactics to keep protesters out of the downtown business area. Another thousand students gathered at the church and left to walk across Kelly Ingram Park while chanting, "We're going to walk, walk, walk. Freedom ... freedom ... freedom." As the demonstrators left the church, police warned them to stop and turn back, "or you'll get wet". When they continued, Connor ordered the city's fire hoses, set at a level that would peel bark off a tree or separate bricks from mortar, to be turned on the children. Boys' shirts were ripped off, and girls were pushed over the tops of cars by the force of the water. When the students crouched or fell, the blasts of water rolled them down the asphalt streets and concrete sidewalks. Connor allowed white spectators to push forward, shouting, "Let those people come forward, sergeant. I want 'em to see the dogs work." (Note: Time magazine originally reported that Connor said, "Look at those niggers run!" However, when the Time reporter was questioned, he admitted he did not hear the statement, which was published in any case by Newsweek magazine and several newspapers and became one of Connor's "most memorable lines".)

A.G. Gaston, who was appalled at the idea of using children, was on the phone with white attorney David Vann trying to negotiate a resolution to the crisis. When Gaston looked out the window and saw the children being hit with high-pressure water, he said, "Lawyer Vann, I can't talk to you now or ever. My people are out there fighting for their lives and my freedom. I have to go help them", and hung up the phone. Black parents and adults who were observing cheered on the marching students, but when the hoses were turned on, bystanders began to throw rocks and bottles at the police. To disperse them, Connor ordered police to use German Shepherd dogs to keep them in line. James Bevel wove in and out of the crowds warning them, "If any cops get hurt, we're going to lose this fight." At 3 pm, the protest was over. During a kind of truce, protesters went home. Police removed the barricades and re-opened the streets to traffic. That evening King told worried parents in a crowd of a thousand, "Don't worry about your children who are in jail. The eyes of the world are on Birmingham. We're going on in spite of dogs and fire hoses. We've gone too far to turn back now."

==== Images of the day ====
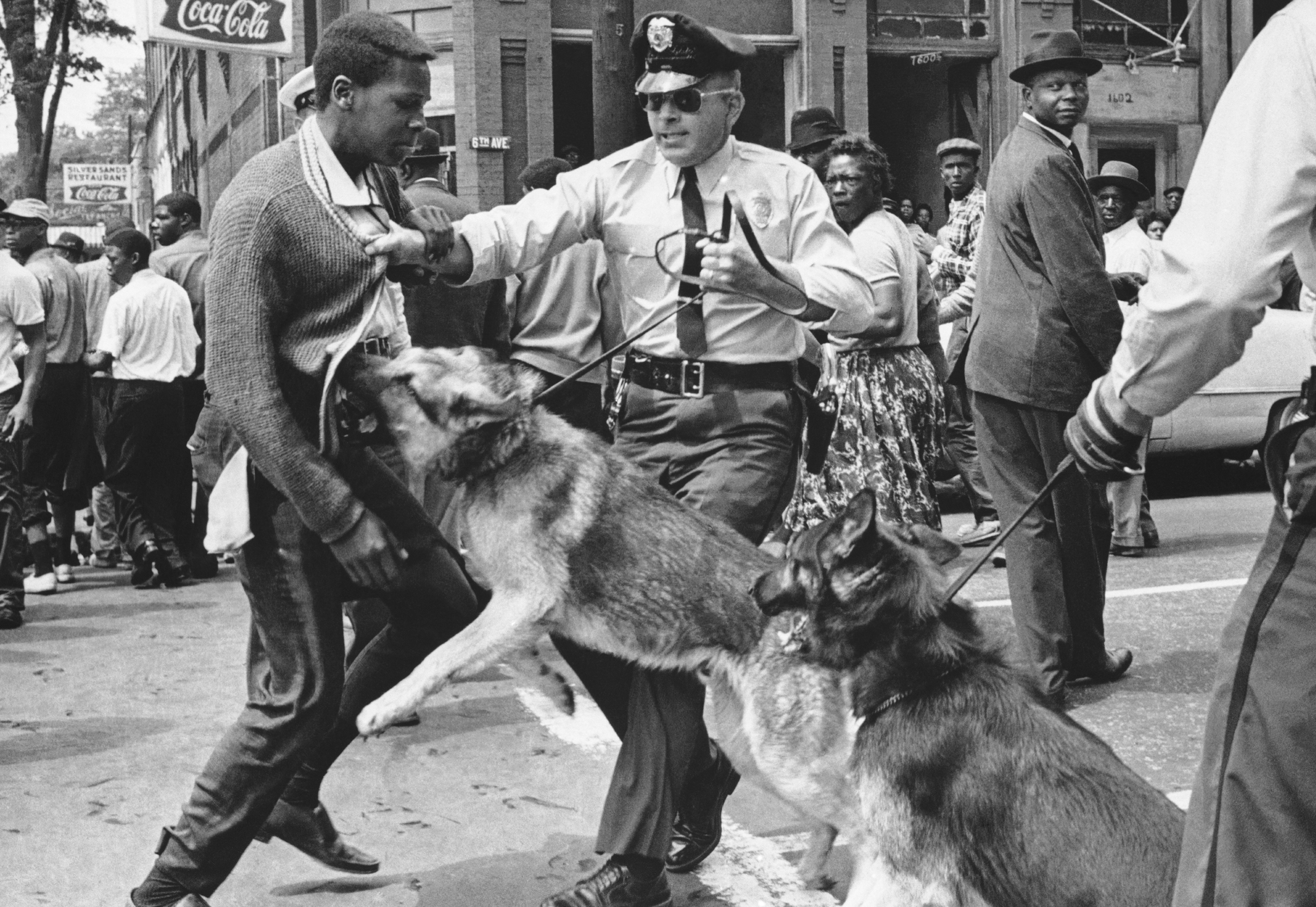
Bill Hudson's image of Parker High School student Walter Gadsden being attacked by dogs was published in The New York Times on May 4, 1963.

The images had a profound effect in Birmingham. Despite decades of disagreements, when the photos were released, "the black community was instantaneously consolidated behind King", according to David Vann, who would later serve as mayor of Birmingham. Horrified at what the Birmingham police were doing to protect segregation, New York Senator Jacob K. Javits declared, "the country won't tolerate it", and pressed Congress to pass a civil rights bill. Similar reactions were reported by Kentucky Senator Sherman Cooper, and Oregon Senator Wayne Morse, who compared Birmingham to South Africa under apartheid. A New York Times editorial called the behavior of the Birmingham police "a national disgrace." The Washington Post editorialized, "The spectacle in Birmingham ... must excite the sympathy of the rest of the country for the decent, just, and reasonable citizens of the community, who have so recently demonstrated at the polls their lack of support for the very policies that have produced the Birmingham riots. The authorities who tried, by these brutal means, to stop the freedom marchers do not speak or act in the name of the enlightened people of the city." President Kennedy sent Assistant Attorney General Burke Marshall to Birmingham to help negotiate a truce. Marshall faced a stalemate when merchants and protest organizers refused to budge.

=== Standoff ===
Black onlookers in the area of Kelly Ingram Park abandoned nonviolence on May 5. Spectators taunted police, and SCLC leaders begged them to be peaceful or go home. James Bevel borrowed a bullhorn from the police and shouted, "Everybody get off this corner. If you're not going to demonstrate in a nonviolent way, then leave!" Commissioner Connor was overheard saying, "If you'd ask half of them what freedom means, they couldn't tell you." To prevent further marches, Connor ordered the doors to the churches blocked to prevent students from leaving.

By May 6, the jails were so full that Connor transformed the stockade at the state fairgrounds into a makeshift jail to hold protesters. Black protestors arrived at white churches to integrate services. They were accepted in Roman Catholic, Episcopal, and Presbyterian churches but turned away at others, where they knelt and prayed until they were arrested. Well-known national figures arrived to show support. Singer Joan Baez arrived to perform for free at Miles College and stayed at the black-owned and integrated Gaston Motel. Comedian Dick Gregory and Barbara Deming, a writer for The Nation, were both arrested. The young Dan Rather reported for CBS News. The car of Fannie Flagg, a local television personality and recent Miss Alabama finalist, was surrounded by teenagers who recognized her. Flagg worked at Channel 6 on the morning show, and after asking her producers why the show was not covering the demonstrations, she received orders never to mention them on air. She rolled down the window and shouted to the children, "I'm with you all the way!"

Birmingham's fire department refused orders from Connor to turn the hoses on demonstrators again, and waded through the basement of the 16th Street Baptist Church to clean up water from earlier fire-hose flooding. White business leaders met with protest organizers to try and arrange an economic solution but said they had no control over politics. Protest organizers disagreed, saying that business leaders were positioned to pressure political leaders.

=== City paralysis ===
The situation reached a crisis on May 7, 1963. Breakfast in the jail took four hours to distribute to all the prisoners. Seventy members of the Birmingham Chamber of Commerce pleaded with the protest organizers to stop the actions. The NAACP asked for sympathizers to picket in unity in 100 American cities. Twenty rabbis flew to Birmingham to support the cause, equating silence about segregation to the atrocities of the Holocaust. Local rabbis disagreed and asked them to go home. The editor of The Birmingham News wired President Kennedy and pleaded with him to end the protests.

Fire hoses were used once again, injuring police and Fred Shuttlesworth, as well as other demonstrators. Commissioner Connor expressed regret at missing seeing Shuttlesworth get hit and said he "wished they'd carried him away in a hearse". Another 1,000 people were arrested, bringing the total to 2,500.

News of the mass arrests of children had reached Western Europe and the Soviet Union. The Soviet Union devoted up to 25 percent of its news broadcast to the demonstrations, sending much of it to Africa, where Soviet and U.S. interests clashed. Soviet news commentary accused the Kennedy administration of neglect and "inactivity". Alabama Governor George Wallace sent state troopers to assist Connor. Attorney General Robert Kennedy prepared to activate the Alabama National Guard and notified the Second Infantry Division from Fort Benning, Georgia that it might be deployed to Birmingham.

No business of any kind was being conducted downtown. Organizers planned to flood the downtown area businesses with black people. Smaller groups of decoys were set out to distract police attention from activities at the 16th Street Baptist Church. Protesters set off false fire alarms to occupy the fire department and its hoses. One group of children approached a police officer and announced, "We want to go to jail!" When the officer pointed the way, the students ran across Kelly Ingram Park shouting, "We're going to jail!" Six hundred picketers reached downtown Birmingham. Large groups of protesters sat in stores and sang freedom songs. Streets, sidewalks, stores, and buildings were overwhelmed with more than 3,000 protesters. The sheriff and chief of police admitted to Burke Marshall that they did not think they could handle the situation for more than a few hours.

=== Resolution ===
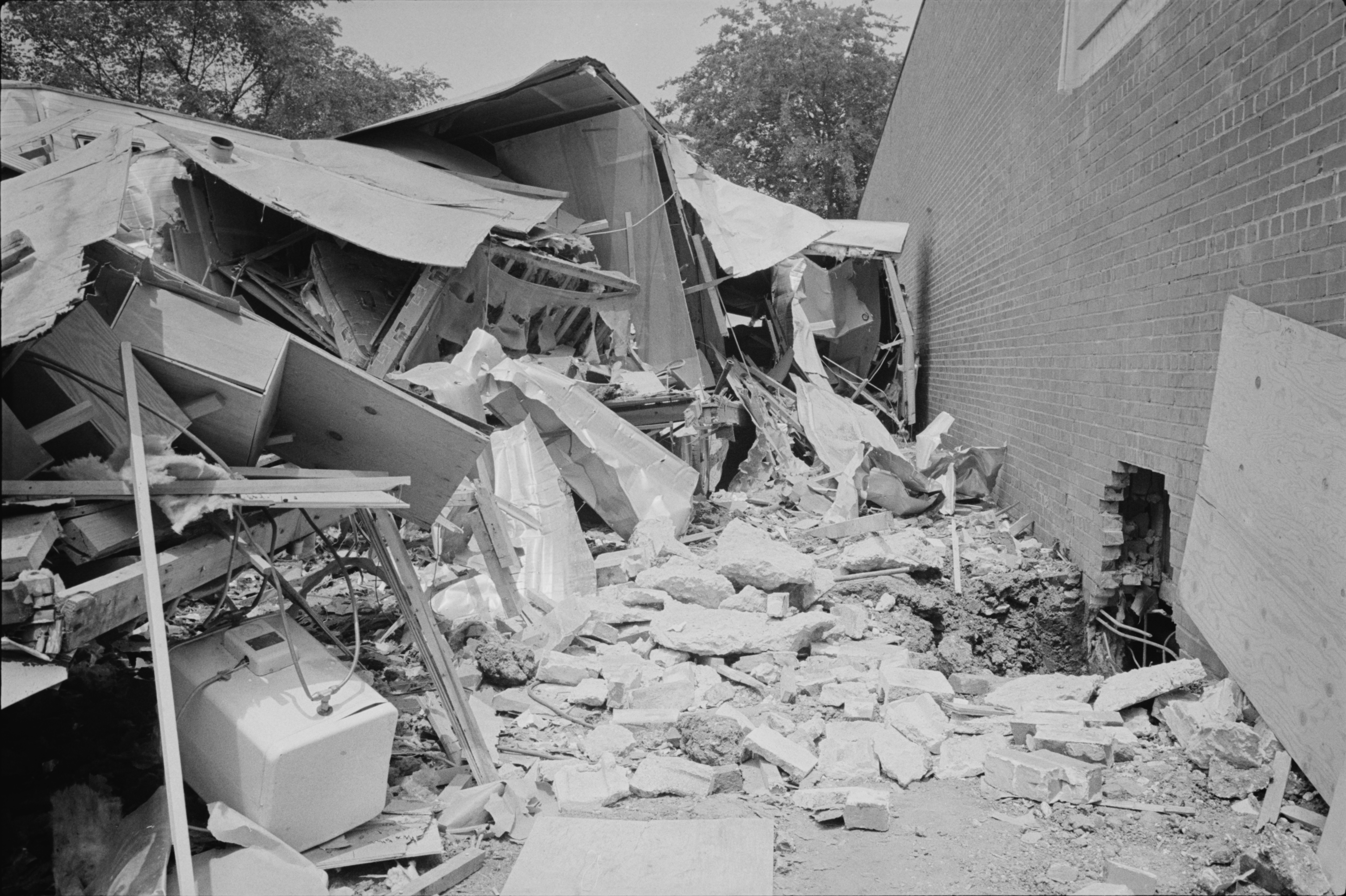
Wreckage at the A.G. Gaston Motel following the bomb explosion on May 11, 1963

On May 8 at 4 am, white business leaders agreed to most of the protesters' demands. Political leaders held fast, however. The rift between the businessmen and the politicians became clear when business leaders admitted they could not guarantee the protesters' release from jail. On May 10, Fred Shuttlesworth and Martin Luther King Jr. told reporters that they had an agreement from the City of Birmingham to desegregate lunch counters, restrooms, drinking fountains and fitting rooms within 90 days, and to hire black people in stores as salesmen and clerks. Those in jail would be released on bond or their own recognizance. Urged by Kennedy, the United Auto Workers, National Maritime Union, United Steelworkers Union, and the American Federation of Labor and Congress of Industrial Organizations (AFL-CIO) raised $237,000 in bail money ($2,490,000 in 2025) to free the demonstrators. Commissioner Connor and the outgoing mayor condemned the resolution.

On the night of May 11, a bomb heavily damaged the A.G. Gaston Motel where King had been staying—and had left only hours before—and another damaged the house of A. D. King, Martin Luther King Jr.'s brother. When police went to inspect the motel, they were met with rocks and bottles from neighborhood black citizens. The arrival of state troopers only further angered the crowd; in the early hours of the morning, thousands of black people rioted, numerous buildings and vehicles were burned, and several people, including a police officer, were stabbed. By May 13, three thousand federal troops were deployed to Birmingham to restore order, even though Alabama Governor George Wallace told President Kennedy that state and local forces were sufficient. Martin Luther King Jr. returned to Birmingham to stress nonviolence.

Outgoing mayor Art Hanes left office after the Alabama State Supreme Court ruled that Albert Boutwell could take office on May 21, 1963. Upon picking up his last paycheck, Bull Connor remarked tearfully, "This is the worst day of my life." In June 1963, the Jim Crow signs regulating segregated public places in Birmingham were taken down.

== After the campaign ==
Desegregation in Birmingham took place slowly after the demonstrations. King and the SCLC were criticized by some for ending the campaign with promises that were too vague and "settling for a lot less than even moderate demands". In fact, Sydney Smyer, president of the Birmingham Chamber of Commerce, re-interpreted the terms of the agreement. Shuttlesworth and King had announced that desegregation would take place 90 days from May 15. Smyer then said that a single black clerk hired 90 days from when the new city government took office would be sufficient. By July, most of the city's segregation ordinances had been overturned. Some of the lunch counters in department stores complied with the new rules. City parks and golf courses were opened again to black and white citizens. Mayor Boutwell appointed a biracial committee to discuss further changes. However, no hiring of black clerks, police officers, and firefighters had yet been completed and the Birmingham Bar Association rejected membership by black attorneys.

The reputation of Martin Luther King Jr. soared after the protests in Birmingham, and he was lauded by many as a hero. The SCLC was much in demand to effect change in many Southern cities. In the summer of 1963, King led the March on Washington for Jobs and Freedom where he delivered his most famous speech, "I Have a Dream". King became Time's Man of the Year for 1963 and won the Nobel Peace Prize in 1964.

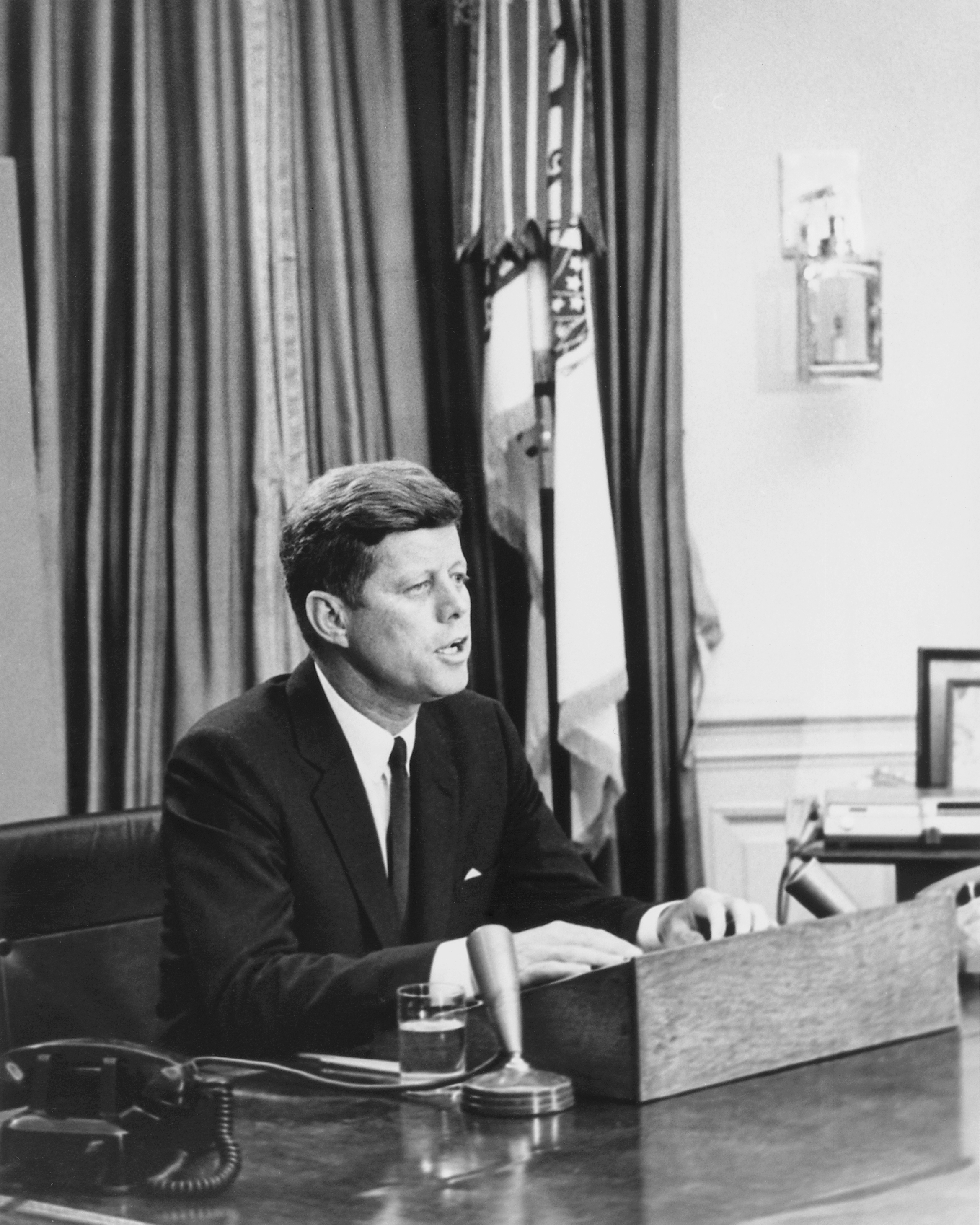
John F. Kennedy addressing the nation about Civil Rights on June 11, 1963

The Birmingham campaign, as well as George Wallace's refusal to admit black students to the University of Alabama, convinced President Kennedy to address the severe inequalities between black and white citizens in the South: "The events in Birmingham and elsewhere have so increased cries for equality that no city or state or legislative body can prudently choose to ignore them." Despite the apparent lack of immediate local success after the Birmingham campaign, Fred Shuttlesworth and Wyatt Tee Walker pointed to its influence on national affairs as its true impact. President Kennedy's administration drew up the Civil Rights Act bill. After being filibustered for 75 days by "diehard southerners" in Congress, it was passed into law in 1964 and signed by President Lyndon Johnson. The Civil Rights Act applied to the entire nation, prohibiting racial discrimination in employment and in access to public places. Roy Wilkins of the NAACP, however, disagreed that the Birmingham campaign was the primary force behind the Civil Rights Act. Wilkins gave credit to other movements, such as the Freedom Rides, the integration of the University of Mississippi, and campaigns to end public school segregation.

Birmingham's public schools were integrated in September 1963. Governor Wallace sent National Guard troops to keep black students out but President Kennedy reversed Wallace by ordering the troops to stand down. Violence continued to plague the city, however. Someone threw a tear gas canister into Loveman's department store when it complied with the desegregation agreement; twenty people in the store required hospital treatment.

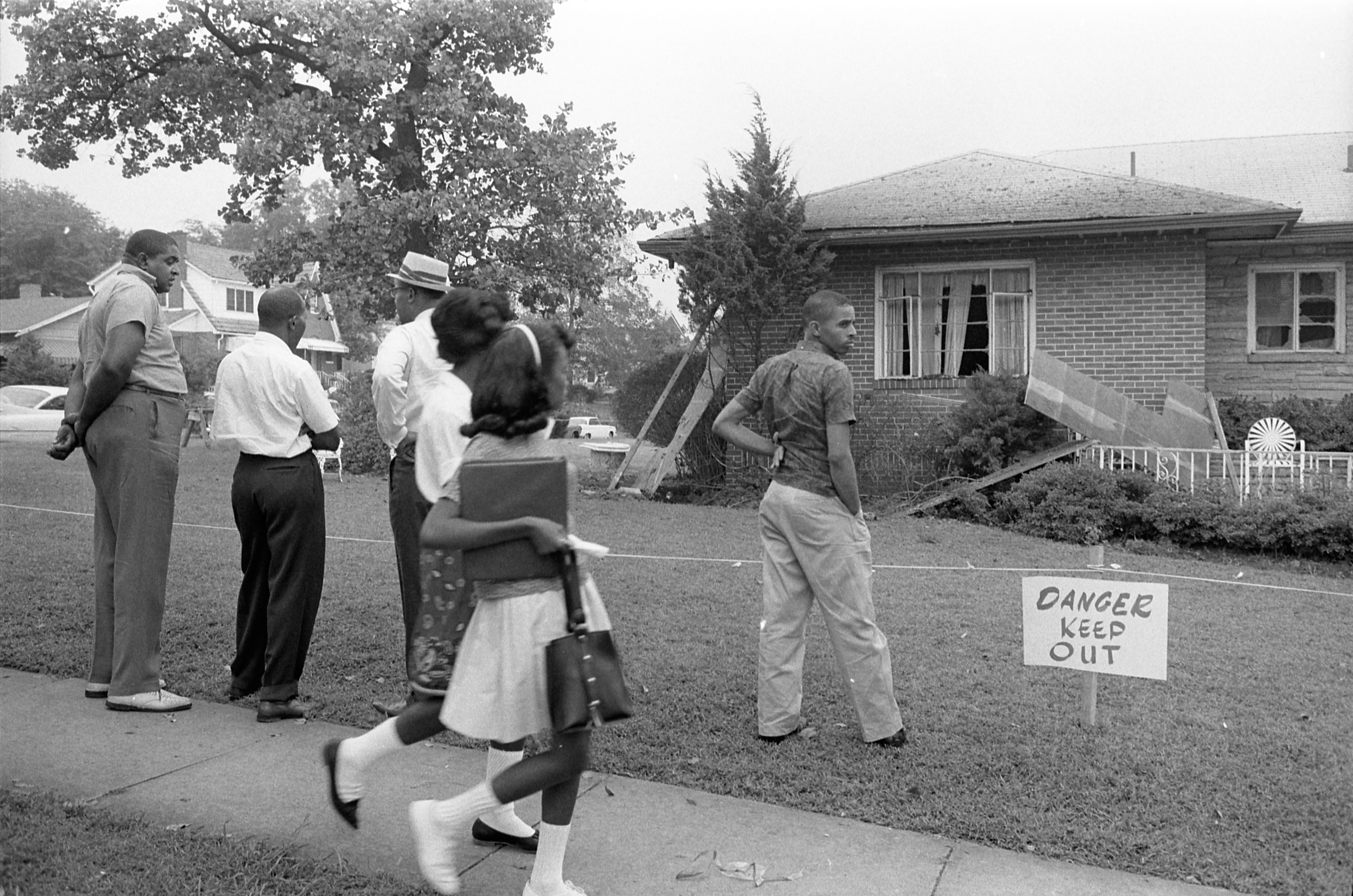
Birmingham residents view the bomb-damaged home of NAACP attorney Arthur Shores on September 5, 1963.

Four months after the Birmingham campaign settlement, someone bombed the house of NAACP attorney Arthur Shores, injuring his wife in the attack. On September 15, 1963, Birmingham again earned international attention when Ku Klux Klan (KKK) members bombed the 16th Street Baptist Church on a Sunday morning and killed four young girls. FBI informant Gary Thomas Rowe was hired to infiltrate the KKK and monitor their activities and plans. Rowe was involved, along with the Birmingham Police, with the KKK attacks on the Freedom Riders, led by Fred Shuttlesworth, in Anniston, Alabama on May 14, 1961. In addition, Rowe and several other Klansmen also partook in the killing of Civil Rights activist Viola Liuzzo on March 25, 1965, in Lowndes County, Alabama after the Selma to Montgomery march.

The Birmingham campaign inspired the Civil Rights Movement in other parts of the South. Two days after King and Shuttlesworth announced the settlement in Birmingham, Medgar Evers of the NAACP in Jackson, Mississippi demanded a biracial committee to address concerns there. On June 12, 1963, Evers was murdered by a KKK member outside his home. He had been organizing demonstrations similar to those in Birmingham to pressure Jackson's city government. In 1965 Shuttlesworth assisted Bevel, King, and the SCLC to lead the Selma to Montgomery marches, intended to increase voter registration among black citizens.

=== Campaign impact ===
Historian Glenn Eskew wrote that the campaign "led to an awakening to the evils of segregation and a need for reforms in the region." According to Eskew, the riots that occurred after the bombing of the Gaston Motel foreshadowed rioting in larger cities later in the 1960s. ACMHR vice president Abraham Woods claimed that the rioting in Birmingham set a precedent for the "Burn, baby, burn" mindset, a cry used in later civic unrest in the Watts riots, the 12th Street riots in Detroit, and other American cities in the 1960s. A study of the Watts riots concluded, "The 'rules of the game' in race relations were permanently changed in Birmingham."

Wyatt Tee Walker wrote that the Birmingham campaign was "legend" and had become the Civil Rights Movement's most important chapter. It was "the chief watershed of the nonviolent movement in the United States. It marked the maturation of the SCLC as a national force in the civil rights arena of the land that had been dominated by the older and stodgier NAACP." Walker called the Birmingham campaign and the Selma marches "Siamese twins" joining to "kill segregation ... and bury the body". Jonathan Bass declared that "King had won a tremendous public relations victory in Birmingham" but also stated pointedly that "it was the citizens of the Magic City, both black and white, and not Martin Luther King Jr. and the SCLC, that brought about the real transformation of the city."

== See also ==
- Birmingham Civil Rights National Monument
- Birmingham Civil Rights Institute
- In Eyes on the Prize, the award-winning documentary on the Civil Rights movement, the Birmingham campaign is one focus of Episode #4, "No Easy Walk (1961–1963)."

== Bibliography ==
- Bass, S. Jonathan (2001). Blessed Are the Peacemakers: Martin Luther King, Jr., Eight White Religious Leaders, and the 'Letter from Birmingham Jail'. Louisiana State University Press. ISBN 0-8071-2655-1.
- Branch, Taylor (1988). Parting The Waters; America in the King Years 1954–63. Simon & Schuster. ISBN 0-671-46097-8.
- Cotman, John (1989). Birmingham, JFK, and the Civil Rights Act of 1963: Implications For Elite Theory. Peter Lang Publishing. ISBN 0-8204-0806-9.
- Davis, Jack. (2001). The Civil Rights Movement, Oxford. ISBN 0-631-22044-5.
- Eskew, Glenn (1997). But for Birmingham: The Local and National Movements in the Civil Rights Struggle. University of North Carolina Press. ISBN 0-8078-6132-4.
- Fairclough, Adam (1987). To Redeem the Soul of America: the Southern Christian Leadership Conference and Martin Luther King, Jr. University of Georgia Press. ISBN 0-8203-0898-6.
- Franklin, Jimmie (1989). Back to Birmingham: Richard Arrington, Jr. and His Times. University of Alabama Press. ISBN 0-8173-0435-5.
- Garrow, David (1986). Bearing the Cross: Martin Luther King, Jr., and the Southern Christian Leadership Conference. William Morrow and Company. ISBN 0-688-04794-7.
- Garrow, David, ed. (1989). Birmingham, Alabama, 1956–1963: The Black Struggle for Civil Rights. Carlson Publishing. ISBN 0-926019-04-X.
- Hampton, Henry, Fayer, S. (1990). Voices of Freedom: An Oral History of the Civil Rights Movement from the 1950s Through the 1980s. Bantam Books. ISBN 0-553-05734-0.
- Isserman, Maurice, Kazin, Michael. (2008). America Divided: The Civil War of the 1960s, Oxford. ISBN 0-19-509190-6.
- Manis, Andrew (1999). A Fire You Can't Put Out: The Civil Rights Life of Birmingham's Reverend Fred Shuttlesworth. University of Alabama Press. ISBN 0-585-35440-5.
- McWhorter, Diane (2001). Carry Me Home: Birmingham, Alabama, the Climactic Battle of the Civil Rights Revolution. Simon & Schuster. ISBN 0-7432-1772-1.
- Nunnelley, William (1991). Bull Connor. University of Alabama Press. ISBN 0-585-32316-X.
- White, Marjorie, Manis, Andrew, eds. (2000). Birmingham Revolutionaries: The Reverend Fred Shuttlesworth and the Alabama Christian Movement for Human Rights. Mercer University Press. ISBN 0-86554-709-2.
- Wilson, Bobby (2000). Race and Place in Birmingham: The Civil Rights and Neighborhood Movements. Rowman & Littlefield. ISBN 0-8476-9482-8.
