= Carry Me Home (book) =

2001 book by Diane McWhorter

Carry Me Home: Birmingham, Alabama, the Climactic Battle of the Civil Rights Revolution
- Author: Diane McWhorter
- Subject: African-American civil rights movement
- Publisher: Simon & Schuster
- Publication date: 2001

Carry Me Home: Birmingham, Alabama, the Climactic Battle of the Civil Rights Revolution, is a nonfiction book about the African-American civil rights movement written by Diane McWhorter and published by Simon & Schuster in 2001. The book, which is part investigative journalism and part memoir, won the J. Anthony Lukas Book Prize and the 2002 Pulitzer Prize for General Nonfiction.

McWhorter grew up in Birmingham, Alabama, and recounts being about the same age as the girls killed in the September 1963 bombing of the 16th Street Baptist Church, though she "was growing up on the wrong side of the revolution". While four black girls were murdered in that day's bombing, McWhorter recalls that the only repercussion of the killings on her white high school was the cancellation of a play rehearsal. Carry Me Home describes how bigotry was prevalent among whites and her interviews and reviews of documents from the civil rights era showed "the long tradition of enmeshment between law enforcers and Klansmen", ranging from local and state police to agents of the Federal Bureau of Investigation.

She describes how local political leaders, newspaper editors and Police, by supporting segregation exercised consistently poor judgment which rescued the cause of civil rights demonstrators during the Birmingham campaign; police chief Bull Connor responding to peaceful protests from local teenagers with high-pressure fire hose and police dogs and encouraged Ku Klux Klan attacks. Wyatt Tee Walker of the Southern Christian Leadership Conference recounted how "Birmingham would have been lost if Bull had let us go down to the city hall and pray".'

McWhorter notes the May 3, 1963, photo by Associated Press photographer Bill Hudson of Walter Gadsden, an African-American bystander who had been grabbed by a sunglasses-wearing police officer, while a German Shepherd lunged at his chest. The photo appeared above the fold, covering three columns in the next day's issue of The New York Times, as well as in other newspapers nationwide. McWhorter wrote that Hudson's photo that day drove "international opinion to the side of the civil rights revolution".

In his review of the book in The New York Times, David K. Shipler credits McWhorter as being "impressive at gathering facts and sourcing them precisely"; though he notes that "[a]t times, the themes are lost in dizzying detail, the trees overwhelm the forest", he nonetheless concludes that it is "very much worth the effort."

The book won the 2002 Pulitzer Prize for General Nonfiction.
