= Birmingham riot of 1963 =

1963 unrest following the targeted bombings of Civil Rights leaders in Birmingham, AL, US

- Part of the Civil Rights Movement
- Location: Birmingham, Alabama, United States
- Date: May 11, 1963
- Perpetrator: Ku Klux Klan (alleged)

The Birmingham riot of 1963 was a civil disorder and riot in Birmingham, Alabama, that was provoked by bombings on the night of May 11, 1963. The bombings targeted African-American leaders of the Birmingham campaign. In response, local African-Americans burned businesses and fought police throughout the downtown area.

The places bombed were the parsonage of Rev. A. D. King, brother of Martin Luther King Jr., and a motel owned by A. G. Gaston, where King and others organizing the campaign had stayed. It is believed that the bombings were carried out by members of the Ku Klux Klan, in cooperation with Birmingham police. Civil rights protesters were frustrated with local police complicity with the perpetrators of the bombings, and grew frustrated at the non-violence strategy directed by King. Initially starting as a protest, violence escalated following local police intervention. The federal government intervened with federal troops for the first time to control violence during a largely African-American riot. It was also a rare instance of domestic military deployment independent of enforcing a court injunction, an action which was considered controversial by Governor George Wallace and other Alabama whites. The African-American response was a pivotal event that contributed to President Kennedy's decision to propose a major civil rights bill. It was ultimately passed under President Lyndon B. Johnson as the Civil Rights Act of 1964.

== Background ==
On May 10, 1963, negotiators for the city, local businesses, and the civil rights campaign had completed and announced the "Birmingham Truce Agreement". The agreement included city and business commitments for partial desegregation (of fitting rooms, water fountains, and lunch counters in retail stores), promises of economic advancement for African-American workers, release of persons who had been arrested in demonstrations, and the formation of a Committee on Racial Problems and Employment. In an afternoon press conference held at the Gaston Motel, where King and his team were staying, Rev. Fred Shuttlesworth read a version of the agreement, after which King declared a "great victory" and prepared to leave town. However, some white leaders, including the city's powerful Commissioner of Public Safety Bull Connor, who had used dogs and fire hoses against demonstrators, denounced the agreement and suggested that they might not enforce its provisions.

== Preparations ==
On the morning of May 11, 1963, state troopers were withdrawing from Birmingham under orders from Governor George Wallace. Investigator Ben Allen had been alerted about a potential bombing of the Gaston Motel by a source within the Klan and recommended that these troops stay for a few more days. Allen's warning was disregarded by state Public Safety Director Al Lingo, who said he could "take care of" the Klan threat. Martin Luther King Jr., left Birmingham for Atlanta.

Also during the day on May 11, Klan leaders from across the South were assembling in nearby Bessemer, Alabama for a rally. Klan Imperial Wizard Robert Shelton addressed the white crowd, urging rejection of "any concessions or demands from any of the atheist so-called ministers of the nigger race or any other group here in Birmingham." He also said that "Klansmen would be willing to give their lives if necessary to protect segregation in Alabama." The crowd was, reportedly, unenthusiastic, as they were demoralized by the momentum toward desegregation. The rally ended at 10:15 pm.

At 8:08 p.m. that evening, the Gaston Motel received a death threat against King,

== Bombings ==
At around 10:30 p.m., a number of Birmingham police departed the parking lot of the Holy Family Hospital, driving toward the home of Martin Luther King's brother, A. D. King, in the Ensley neighborhood. Some police traveled in an unmarked car.

=== A. D. King residence ===
At about 10:45 p.m., a uniformed officer got out of his police car and placed a package near A. D. King's front porch. The officer returned to the car. As he drove away, the officer threw an object out of the car's window. The object landed two to three feet from the sidewalk, where it caused a small but loud explosion and knocked over bystander Roosevelt Tatum.

Tatum got up and moved toward the King house—only to face another, larger, blast from the package near the porch. This explosion destroyed the front of the house. Tatum survived and ran toward the back of the house, where he found A. D. King and his wife Naomi trying to escape with their five children.

Tatum told King that he had seen police deliver the bombs. King called the Federal Bureau of Investigation (FBI), demanding action against the local police department.

=== Gaston Motel ===
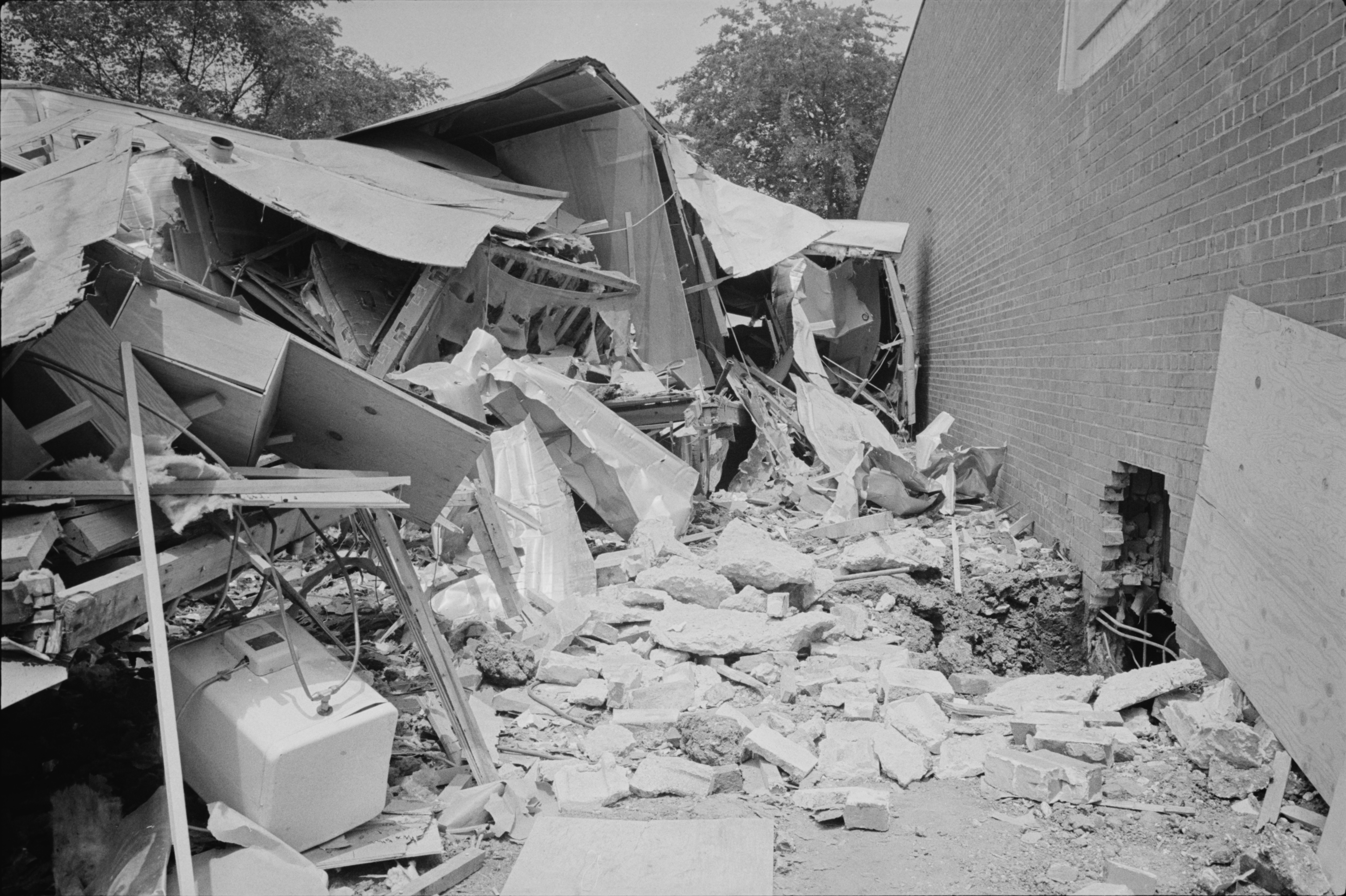
Bomb wreckage near Gaston Motel

At 11:58 p.m., a bomb thrown from a moving car detonated immediately beneath Room 30 at the Gaston Motel—the room where Martin Luther King had been staying. The Gaston Motel was owned by A. G. Gaston, an African-American businessman who often provided resources to assist the Alabama Christian Movement for Human Rights. Attorney and activist Orzell Billingsley had intended to sleep in Room 30 because he was exhausted from days of negotiation and his wife was throwing a party at the couple's house. However, he was so tired that he fell asleep at home after stopping there for clothes.

The motel bomb could be heard all over town. It interrupted the singing of children in the juvenile detention center, most of whom had been arrested during the civil rights demonstrations. Next, the children heard the sound of white men repeatedly singing "Dixie" over the jail's loudspeakers.

Bryan McFall of the FBI was expecting his Klan informant Gary Rowe to report at 10:30 p.m., immediately after the end of the Klan rally. McFall searched in vain for Rowe until finding him at 3:00 a.m. in the VFW Hall near the Gaston Motel. Rowe told McFall, his FBI handler, that Black Muslims had perpetrated a false flag bombing in order to blame the Klan. McFall was unconvinced. However, in submitting his final report to J. Edgar Hoover, head of the FBI, McFall did not identify the Klan as potentially responsible for the bombing, nor did he question the credibility of Rowe as an informant.

Contemporary historians widely believe that the bombing was carried out by four Klan members, including Gary Rowe and known bomber Bill Holt. Rowe was already suspected by the Klan to be a government informant, and other members may have compelled him to assist with the bombing in order to test his fidelity to the white supremacy cause.

== Unrest ==
Many African-American witnesses held police accountable for the bombing of the King house, and immediately began to express their anger. Some began to sing "We Shall Overcome", while others began to throw rocks and other small objects. More people mobilized after the second blast. As it was Saturday night, many had been celebrating the agreement that had been reached and had been drinking. Many of them were already frustrated with the strategy of nonviolence as espoused by Martin Luther King and his Southern Christian Leadership Conference and turned to violence. Three African-American men knifed white police officer J. N. Spivey in the ribs.

Several reporters who had been drinking at the bar got into a shared rental car and headed toward the commotion. A crowd of about 2,500 people had formed and was blocking police cars and fire trucks from the Gaston Motel area. A fire that started at an Italian grocery store spread to the whole block. As traffic started to move, Birmingham Police drove their six-wheeled armored vehicle down the street, spraying tear gas. An unexplained U.S. Army tank also appeared.

At 2:30 a.m., a large battalion of state troopers, commanded by Al Lingo and armed with submachine guns, arrived on the scene. About 100 were mounted on horses. These troops menaced any African-Americans remaining in the street, as well as the white journalists, who were forced into the lobby of the motel. Hospitals treated more than 50 wounded people.

The white journalists and a group of blacks were sequestered in the bombed motel (with no food or water) until morning. Heavily armed forces continued to patrol the streets, "giving this industrial city ..." (in the words of one newspaper report) "the appearance of a city under siege on this Mother's Day."

== Operation Oak Tree ==
U.S. President John F. Kennedy ended a vacation at Camp David (near Thurmont, Maryland) early in order to respond to the situation. Conflicted about whether to deploy federal troops, Kennedy wanted to save face after the violence in Birmingham became covered as international news, and he wanted to protect the truce that had just been established. At the same time, he did not want to set a precedent that might compel routine military interventions, and he feared a backlash among southern white Democrats who opposed a federal "invasion". In Kennedy's opinion, however, in Birmingham "the people who've gotten out of hand are not the white people, but the Negroes by and large," thus making intervention more palatable.

Over TV and radio, Kennedy announced that the "government will do whatever must be done to preserve order, to protect the lives of its citizens ... [and to] uphold the law of the land." He raised the alert for troops on nearby military bases and suggested that the Alabama National Guard might be federalized. He also dispatched Department of Justice attorney Burke Marshall, who had just returned to Washington, D.C. after helping to broker the Birmingham Truce. The Army mission to Birmingham, titled Operation Oak Tree, was headed by Maj. General Creighton Abrams and headquartered with the FBI in the Birmingham federal building. At the operation's peak (on May 18), about 18,000 soldiers were placed on one-, two-, or four-hour alert status, prepared to respond to a crisis in the city.

Governor Wallace learned of Operation Oak Tree on May 14 and complained. In response, Kennedy quietly shifted the Operation's headquarters to Fort McClellan while a handful of officers remained behind at the federal building. Wallace complained again, to the Supreme Court. The Court responded that Kennedy was exercising his authority within U.S. Code Title X, Section 333, stating: "Such purely preparatory measures and their alleged adverse general effects upon the plaintiffs afford no basis for the granting of any relief."

Perceived inefficiencies of the operation led the Joint Chiefs of Staff to draft a memo on preparedness for domestic civil disturbances. According to this memo, the newly created Strike Command should be able "to move readily deployable, tailored Army forces ranging in size from a reinforced company to a maximum force of 15,000 personnel." The Strike Command designated seven Army brigades (amounting to about 21,000 soldiers) as available to respond to civil unrest. The Operation also led the military to increase its efforts at autonomous intelligence gathering, as well as collaboration with the FBI.

== Significance ==
Birmingham activist Abraham Woods considered the disorder to be a "forerunner" to the 1967 wave of riots that followed passage of civil rights legislation and expressed protest at the slow rate of change. Operation Oak Tree was the first time in modern United States history that the federal government deployed military power in response to civil unrest without a specific legal injunction to enforce.

New York City Congressman Adam Clayton Powell Jr. warned that if Kennedy did not move quickly on civil rights in Birmingham, as well as nationally, then riots would spread throughout the country, including to the capital in Washington, DC. Malcolm X affirmed Powell's warning, as well as his criticism of the president.

Malcolm cited the federal response to the Birmingham crisis as evidence of skewed priorities:

President Kennedy did not send troops to Alabama when dogs were biting black babies. He waited three weeks until the situation exploded. He then sent troops after the Negroes had demonstrated their ability to defend themselves. In his talk with Alabama editors Kennedy did not urge that Negroes be treated right because it is the right thing to do. Instead, he said that if the Negroes aren't well treated the Muslims would become a threat. He urged a change not because it is right but because the world is watching this country. Kennedy is wrong because his motivation is wrong.

Malcolm X later said in his well-known Message to the Grass Roots speech:

By the way, right at that time Birmingham had exploded, and the Negroes in Birmingham—remember, they also exploded. They began to stab the crackers in the back and bust them up 'side their head—yes, they did. That's when Kennedy sent in the troops, down in Birmingham. So, and right after that, Kennedy got on the television and said "this is a moral issue."

Malcolm X's evaluation is largely confirmed by modern scholarship. Nicholas Bryant, author of the most comprehensive study of President Kennedy's decision-making on civil rights policy, notes that during the predominantly nonviolent Birmingham campaign, Kennedy refused to make a commitment to forceful intervention or new legislation. He resisted the influence of the powerful, internationally publicized photograph of a police dog tearing into an African-American youth. The legislative situation was hopeless, he claimed, and he did not think the events in Birmingham would influence the voting intentions of a single lawmaker "... While Kennedy recognized the potent symbolic value of the [police dog] image, he was unwilling to counteract it with a symbolic gesture of his own." Bryant concludes:

It was the black-on-white violence of May 11 - not the publication of the startling photograph a week earlier – that represented the real watershed in Kennedy's thinking, and the turning point in administration policy. Kennedy had grown used to segregationist attacks against civil rights protesters. But he – along with his brother and other administration officials – was far more troubled by black mobs running amok.

Timothy Tyson affirms this position, writing that "The violence threatened to mar SCLC's victory but also helped cement White House support for civil rights. It was one of the enduring ironies of the civil rights movement that the threat of violence was so critical to the success of nonviolence." This relationship has been noted by numerous other historians, including Howard Zinn, Clayborne Carson, Glenn Eskew and Gary Younge.

Declassified recordings of a White House meeting on May 12, 1963, are often cited in support of this view:

Robert Kennedy: The Negro Reverend Walker ... he said that the Negroes, when dark comes tonight, they're going to start going after the policemen—headhunting—trying to shoot to kill policemen. He says it's completely out of hand ... you could trigger off a good deal of violence around the country now, with Negroes saying they've been abused for all these years and they're going to follow the ideas of the Black Muslims now ... If they feel on the other hand that the federal government is their friend, that it's intervening for them, that it's going to work for them, then it will head some of that off. I think that's the strongest argument for doing something ...

President Kennedy: First we have to have law and order, so the Negros not running all over the city ... If the [local Birmingham desegregation] agreement blows up, the other remedy we have under that condition is to send legislation up to congress this week as our response ... As a means of providing relief we have to have legislation.

== See also ==
- Bombingham
- Birmingham Civil Rights National Monument
- List of incidents of civil unrest in the United States
