= Sun-n-Sand Motor Hotel =

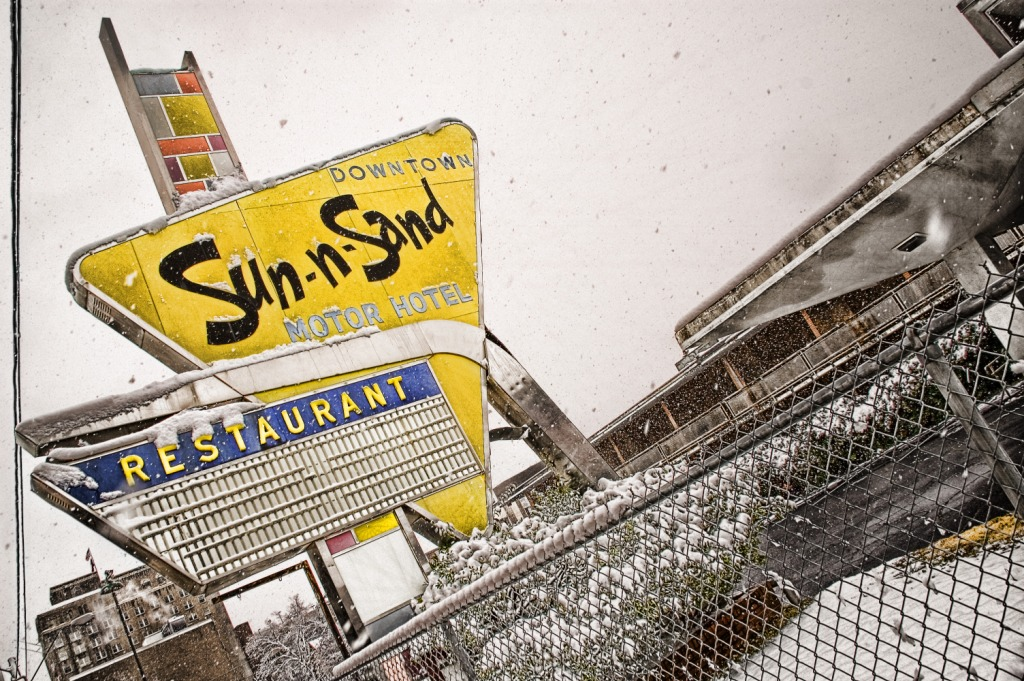
- The sign and building in 2010
- Interactive map of the Sun-n-Sand Motor Hotel area

General information
- Status: Partially demolished
- Type: Motel
- Architectural style: International Style; Mid-century modern Googie (sign)
- Location: 401 North Lamar Street, Jackson, Mississippi, United States
- Coordinates: 32°18′15″N 90°11′7″W
- Opened: 1960
- Closed: c. 2001–2002
- Demolished: 2021

Mississippi Landmark
- Designated: January 2020

The Sun-n-Sand Motor Hotel was a motel in Jackson, Mississippi, United States. The motel was opened in 1960 and partially demolished in 2021.

The motel was opened by Mississippi businessman Dumas Milner and was designed in either the International or mid-century modern style. Due to its close proximity to the Mississippi State Capitol, the motel served as the temporary lodging for many politicians and elected officials while the Mississippi Legislature was in session. Additionally, during the 1960s, it became a prominent lodging location for activists in the civil rights movement, such as Robert L. Carter of the NAACP and several members of the Council of Federated Organizations during the Freedom Summer project.

In either 2001 or 2002, the motel closed. Following this, the government of Mississippi leased the property as a parking lot for government employees. In 2019, the government purchased the property and announced plans to demolish the building and convert the lot into additional parking spaces. This prompted outcry from many state historians and led to the motel being declared a Mississippi Landmark by the Mississippi Department of Archives and History and being added to the National Trust for Historic Preservation's list of America's Most Endangered Places in 2020. Despite this, much of the structure was demolished by February 2021, with only the sign and some of the commons areas preserved, with the intent of converting the latter into office and meeting spaces.

== Architecture ==
Sources differ slightly on the architectural style of the motel. In a 2019 article in the Jackson Free Press, the motel is described as "a rare example of International-style modernism in Jackson", though a 2021 analysis of the building by the National Trust for Historic Preservation describes it as an example of mid-century modern architecture, with distinctive elements including large plate glass windows and metal screens. The motel had a ballroom, a swimming pool, and a sign that was constructed in either the mid-century modern or Googie style. (Note: In 2020, WJTV, the CBS affiliate for Jackson, reported that the sign was an example of mid-century modern design. However, both a 2019 article in the Jackson Free Press and a 2021 article from the National Trust for Historic Preservation describe the sign as being in the Googie style. In that Jackson Free Press article, Jennifer V. O. Baughn, the chief architectural historian for the Mississippi Department of Archives and History, is cited as calling the sign "probably the state's best surviving example of a Googie sign".) The total floor area of the building, including the commons areas, was at least 60,000 square feet (5,600 m^{2}).

== History ==
The Sun-n-Sand Motor Hotel, located at 401 North Lamar Street, was opened in 1960 by Dumas Milner, a Mississippi businessman, who named the motel after another one that he owned in Biloxi, Mississippi. In addition to the Sun-n-Sand properties, Milner also owned and operated the King Edward Hotel in Jackson. In 1965, the motel opened one of the first bars in Jackson after prohibition was repealed in the city. According to the National Trust for Historic Preservation, the motel was "a fixture of downtown Jackson", and it is referenced in several works of literature that are set in the city, including Willie Morris's My Cat Spit McGee and Kathryn Stockett's The Help. Additionally, Morris wrote his book New York Days while staying at the motel, and John Grisham, who was at the time a member of the Mississippi House of Representatives, wrote A Time to Kill while living in the motel.

=== Use by legislators and activists ===
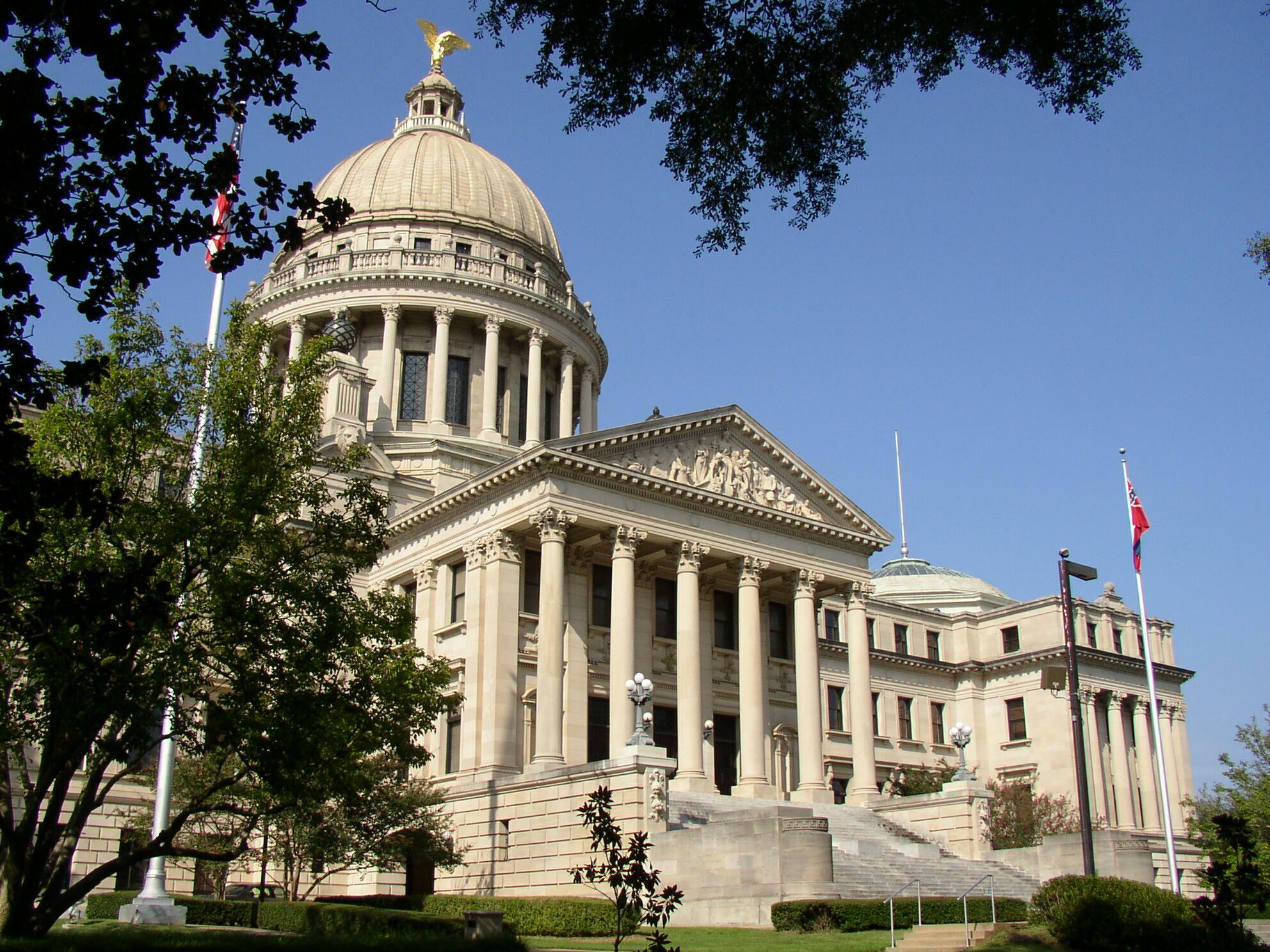
Many state legislators stayed at the motel during legislative sessions due to its proximity to the Mississippi State Capitol (pictured 2008).

Located near the Mississippi State Capitol, the new motel became a popular housing option for several members of the Mississippi Legislature during legislative sessions. Legislators could rent rooms at the motel on a monthly basis, and, according to journalist Keisha Rowe of The Clarion-Ledger, it served as an "informal meeting site" where elected officials could discuss political matters. Following a 1984 meeting at the hotel with politicians William J. McCoy and Michael P. Mills, journalist Sid Salter of the Clarion-Ledger said that the living arrangements at the motel were similar to those of the freshman dormitories at Mississippi State University and that the politicians who stayed there operated under the Chatham House Rule. In 2001, McCoy said concerning the political activities at the motel, "We have passed many important measures because of our conversations after hours in the Sun-n-Sand". Representative Steve Holland similarly noted the significance of the motel in Mississippi politics during a 2009 interview with the Associated Press, saying, "Everything you ever needed to know about what's going on, you could find out at the breakfast table. ... Hell, if you didn't know it, you could start a rumor at 5:30 in the morning. It'd be around the Capitol later that day".

In addition to legislators, many activists in the civil rights movement used the motel while staying in Jackson, such as Robert L. Carter of the NAACP, who stayed at the hotel in 1964. In July of that year, following the passage of the Civil Rights Act of 1964, the motel became one of several in Jackson to desegregate and accept African American patrons. On August 15 of that year, Ku Klux Klan members held a cross burning outside of the motel after they became aware that activists associated with the Council of Federated Organizations were staying there as part of the Freedom Summer project. The motel also served as the meeting place for activists involved in the Wednesdays in Mississippi program. During his time as a member of the Mississippi House of Representatives, Aaron Henry, a civil rights activist who served as the head of the state branch of the NAACP, stayed at the motel. While staying at the motel, Henry was involved in a long-term homosexual relationship that was common knowledge to other residents and workers at the motel, including other politicians. Partially concerning this relationship and the motel in general, historian John Howard wrote in a 1999 history book,

The Sun-n-Sand was a hybrid space, situated on the Lamar Street edge of both the business and Farish Street districts. The only motor hotel within walking distance of the new Capitol, it housed rural and small-town delegates to the state legislature and served as a site for illicit sex

=== Closure ===
In either 2001 or 2002, (Note: Sources vary on whether the motel closed in 2001 or 2002.) the motel closed and many of its physical assets were liquidated via auction. Afterwards, the building was boarded up and became dilapidated. Following its closure, the government of Mississippi leased the site for use as a parking lot by state legislators. In 2005, the property was purchased by Lamar Properties, under whose ownership the state government continued to lease the site. That same year, due to concerns regarding the historic preservation of the building, the nonprofit organization Mississippi Heritage Trust added the Sun-n-Sand Motor Hotel to its list of the "Ten Most Endangered Historic Places in Mississippi".

=== Purchase by the state government ===
In July 2019, the Mississippi Department of Finance and Administration (MDFA) purchased the property for the state government for approximately $1.1 million. (Note: While several sources state that the state government acquired the property in July 2019, a 2019 article in The Clarion-Ledger states that "The Mississippi Department of Finance and Administration purchased the historic Sun-N-Sand motor hotel on Lamar Street years ago". Additionally, concerning the cost of the acquisition, several sources state that the property was purchased for roughly $1.1 million. Other sources offer more vague estimates of "just over $1 million". However, two articles from the Jackson Free Press offer contradictory estimates for the cost of the acquisition of $1,015,021 and $1,285,300. Additionally, those two articles state that the property was acquired in January 2019, while many other sources state that the property was purchased in July 2019.) With the purchase, the MDFA announced plans to demolish the motel building and add additional parking spaces for state government employees. According to a 2021 report from WLBT, the NBC affiliate in Jackson, the purchase and conversion would save money for the state government compared to continued leasing of the site.

The MDFA's plans to demolish the building were decried by many historians and historic preservation organizations in the state. In late October 2019, the Mississippi Department of Archives and History (MDAH) initiated the process of reviewing the site for designation as a Mississippi Landmark, which, according to reporting from the Clarion-Ledger, could potentially save the building from demolition. On November 5, the MDAH started a 30-day public comment period to collect opinions on the site, and by November 19, a petition to preserve the site posted by Mississippi Heritage Trust on Change.org had garnered over 1,300 signatures. By January 2020, the petition had garnered roughly 2,600 signatures. That same month, the MDAH declared the motel a Mississippi Landmark, but still gave authorization to the state government to demolish the building. In their decision, the MDAH granted the MDFA permission to begin demolition work on the building starting in June 2020, but expressed hope that the department could develop a new plan that would preserve the building. The MDFA stated that their plans for redevelopment of the site would see the sign and certain parts of the building, such as the ballroom and commons areas, preserved. Additionally, the sign would be restored and re-electrified. Other additional items, such as historical light fixtures, were also expected to be saved from demolition.

In September 2020, the National Trust for Historic Preservation added the site to its list of America's Most Endangered Places. The National Trust estimated that the demolition work on the building would cost approximately $2.095 million. Concerning the site, the group's Chief Preservation Officer Katherine Malone-France said, "The (Sun-N-Sand) has a history that is as vibrant and distinctive as its architecture, and the National Trust believes it can have an even brighter future. ... Reusing and revitalizing the Sun-N-Sand would help the state of Mississippi celebrate its rich history — including the story of ongoing racial reconciliation represented by 'Wednesdays in Mississippi' — while putting the building back into use in a way that could create jobs and stimulate economic growth".

=== Demolition ===
In October 2020, local television station WJTV reported that preliminary demolition work had begun on the motel, though later reporting from WLBT stated that the structure was not being demolished at the time and that the work being performed was asbestos removal. Structural demolition began in 2021, with the first round of demolition being completed by February of that year. Following this initial demolition work, MDFA Project Director Paula Young said that "select demolition" would take place inside of the remaining structure to prepare it for later renovations. According to Young, the remaining part of the building would be converted into office and meeting spaces. In January 2022, WJTV reported that the MDFA had approved a $4.375 million contract for this work. As of July 2022, renovation work was ongoing for the remaining sections of the building and was planned to be completed by 2023. That same month, the sign was removed for restoration work, later being reinstalled in January 2024.

== See also ==
- A.G. Gaston Motel – Former motel in Birmingham, Alabama, that accommodated activists during the civil rights movement
- List of hotels in the United States
- List of motels

== Sources ==
- "Historic Designation Considered for Iconic Jackson Hotel". Jackson Free Press. Associated Press. November 20, 2019. Archived from the original on November 22, 2019.
- Babson, Steve; Riddle, Dave; Elsila, David (2010). The Color of Law: Ernie Goodman, Detroit, and the Struggle for Labor and Civil Rights. Great Lakes Books. Detroit: Wayne State University Press. ISBN 978-0-8143-3496-6. LCCN 2010011104. OCLC 794415462.
- Bayram, Seyma (December 11, 2019). "A Colorful Past: Can the Sun-N-Sand Be Saved?". Jackson Free Press. Archived from the original on March 28, 2023.
- Bulecza, Jade (October 2, 2020) [October 1, 2020]. "MS Heritage Trust: Sun-n-Sand being demolished". WJTV. Archived from the original on February 28, 2021.
- Cardon, Dustin (July 15, 2019a). "MDFA Landmark Purchases, Free Indoor Tracks for Seniors at YMCA and TAP at Beau Rivage". Jackson Free Press. Archived from the original on September 26, 2021.
- Cardon, Dustin (September 18, 2019b). "A New Workforce Café, and Lots of Renovations". Jackson Free Press. Archived from the original on September 27, 2019.
- Gallant, Jacob (September 24, 2020). "Sun-n-Sand named one of most endangered historic places in America". WLBT. Archived from the original on December 7, 2023.
- Howard, John (1999). Men Like That: A Southern Queer History. Chicago: University of Chicago Press. ISBN 978-0-226-35471-2. LCCN 99024363. OCLC 40925993.
- Ivy, James W., ed. (November 1964). "Report of the Special Mississippi Investigation Committee of the National Board of Directors of the National Association for the Advancement of Colored People". The Crisis. 71 (9). New York City: NAACP: 581–593.
- Parzen, Kendra (February 4, 2021). "Demolition Begins at the Sun-n-Sand Motor Hotel". National Trust for Historic Preservation. Archived from the original on July 24, 2024.
- Rowe, Keisha (November 19, 2019). "Sun-N-Sand Motor Hotel could be saved by historic designation". The Clarion-Ledger. Gannett.
- Salter, Sid (July 5, 2019) [August 2001]. "Remembering Sun-N-Sand's glory days: Power brokers, bare feet and laughter". The Clarion-Ledger. Gannett.
- Sellars, Chelsey (November 16, 2019). "Petition in motion to help Sun-N-Sand Hotel become protected landmark". WLBT. Archived from the original on May 1, 2023.
- Sokol, Jason (2007) [2006]. There Goes My Everything: White Southerners in the Age of Civil Rights, 1945–1975 (First Vintage Books ed.). New York City: Vintage Books. ISBN 978-0-307-49181-7. LCCN 2007280283. OCLC 869563133.
- Ta, Thao (September 24, 2020). "Sun-n-Sand Motor Hotel named one of America's Most Endangered Historic Places". WJTV. Archived from the original on January 7, 2022.
- Vicory, Justin (September 27, 2020). "Parking lot or not? Iconic Sun-N-Sand hotel gets national ally committed to preserving site". The Clarion-Ledger. Gannett.
- Warnock, Sarah (July 5, 2019). "Jackson's landmark Sun-N-Sand Hotel: Over the years". The Clarion-Ledger. Gannett.
- Warren, Anthony (February 6, 2021). "First round of demolition wrapped up at historic Sun-n-Sand site". WLBT. Archived from the original on January 10, 2024.
- Warren, Anthony (July 20, 2022). "Iconic Sun-N-Sand sign taken down for repairs". WLBT. Archived from the original on July 26, 2022.
- Warren, Anthony (January 9, 2024). "Iconic downtown Jackson sign slated to go back up Wednesday". WLBT. Archived from the original on January 17, 2024.
- "Sun-n-Sand Motel designated as Mississippi Landmark". WJTV. January 24, 2020. Archived from the original on November 19, 2022.
- "Reports: Compromise struck on Sun-n-Sand hotel demolition". WJTV. October 5, 2020b. Archived from the original on April 10, 2021.
- "Board approves $4.3M demolition of historic Sun-N-Sand". WJTV. January 6, 2022. Archived from the original on November 19, 2022.
- "Historic Sun-n-Sand motel declared Mississippi Landmark". WLBT. January 24, 2020a. Archived from the original on February 8, 2024.
- "Asbestos removal underway at Sun-N-Sand Motor Hotel". WLBT. October 2, 2020b. Archived from the original on October 2, 2023.
