= A.G. Gaston Motel =

Motel and historical place in Birmingham, Alabama, United States

- Gaston, A.G., Building
- U.S. National Register of Historic Places
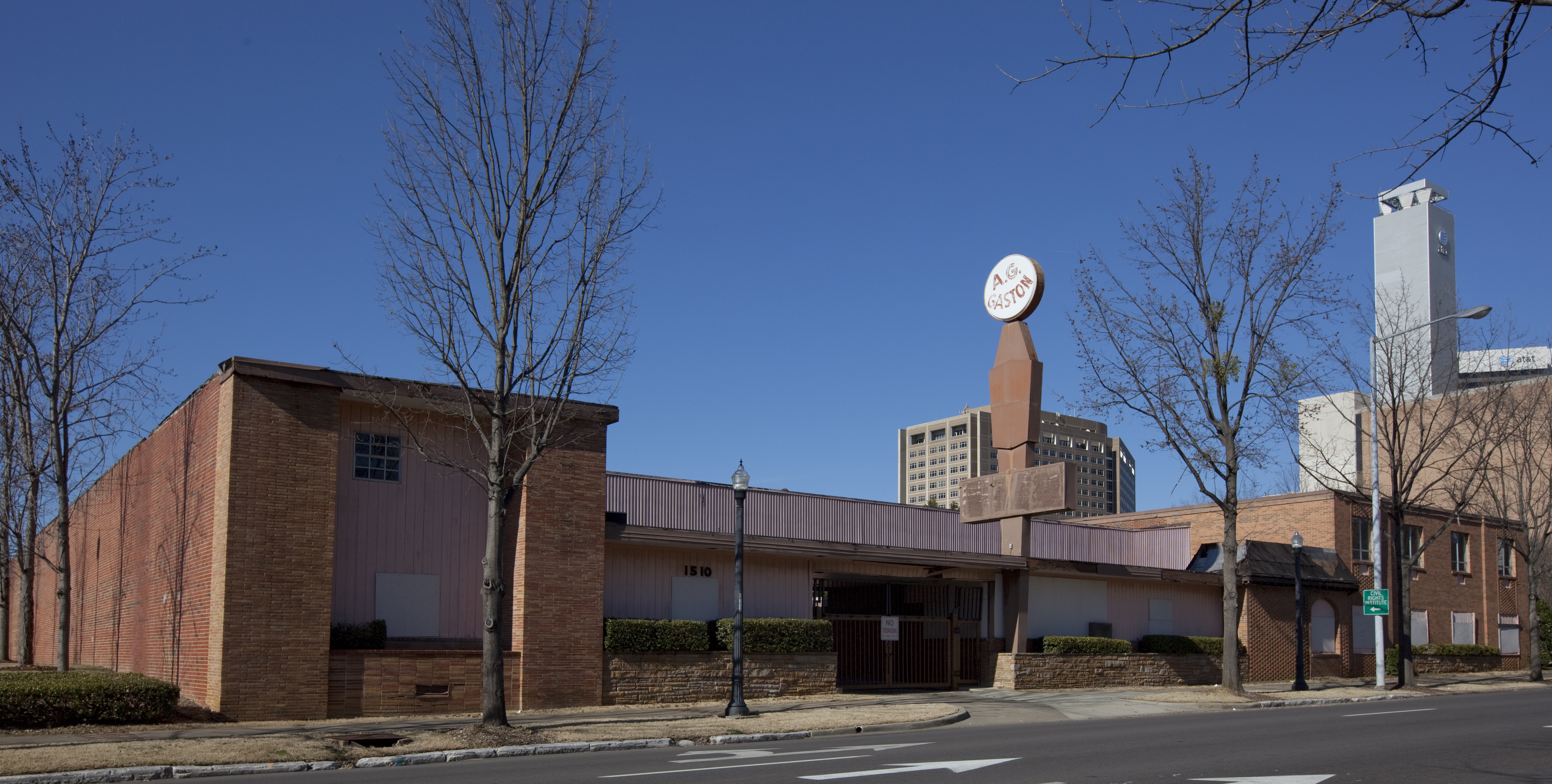
- A.G. Gaston Motel in 2010. Photo by Carol M. Highsmith.

- Location within Alabama
- Location: 1527 Fifth Ave. N, Birmingham, Alabama
- Coordinates: 33°30′54″N 86°48′51″W
- Area: less than one acre
- Built: 1959
- Built by: Bank Building and Equipment Corp.
- Architect: Langston, Perry C.
- Architectural style: International Style
- NRHP reference No.: 00001028
- Added to NRHP: September 11, 2000

A.G. Gaston Motel in 2010. Photos by Carol M. Highsmith.

The A.G. Gaston Motel is a historic building and former motel in Birmingham, Alabama. In 1963 during the Civil Rights movement, the Southern Christian Leadership Conference used a room in the hotel as their headquarters, which was later bombed by terrorists.

== History ==
Built in 1954 by local businessman A. G. Gaston. It served as premium accommodation for African American travelers and was listed in The Negro Motorist Green Book, a travel guide.

The Southern Christian Leadership Conference used room 30 as its headquarters for leaders such as Martin Luther King Jr., Ralph Abernathy, Fred Shuttlesworth, and others, to plan portions of the 1963 Birmingham campaign of the civil rights movement. On May 10, 1963, the motel was bombed by white supremacist terrorists. After discrimination in public accommodation was outlawed, the motel's business declined in the 1970s. It was used as senior housing from 1982 to 1996.

Since 2017 it is owned in part by the Birmingham Civil Rights National Monument, the National Park Service, and the City of Birmingham. It has been designated by the National Trust for Historic Preservation as one of America's National Treasures. The site opened the same week as the 60th anniversary of the 16th Street Baptist Church bombing.

== See also ==
- List of national monuments of the United States
- Sun-n-Sand Motor Hotel – Former motel in Jackson, Mississippi, that accommodated activists during the civil rights movement
