= A. G. Gaston =

African-American civil rights leader (1892–1996)

- Born: Arthur George Gaston; July 4, 1892; Demopolis, Alabama, U.S.
- Died: January 19, 1996 (aged 103); Birmingham, Alabama, U.S.
- Occupation: Entrepreneur
- Relatives: Carol Jenkins (niece)

Arthur George Gaston (July 4, 1892 – January 19, 1996) was an American entrepreneur who established businesses in Birmingham, Alabama. He had a significant role in the movement to remove legal barriers to integration in Birmingham in 1963. In his lifetime, Gaston's companies were some of the most prominent African-American businesses in the American South.

== Early life ==
The grandson of an enslaved person, A.G. Gaston was born on July 4, 1892, in Demopolis, Alabama to Tom and Rosa (McDonald) Gaston. Gaston's father died while he was still an infant. He grew up in a log cabin with his mother and grandparents, Joe and Idella Gaston. He moved to Birmingham in 1905 with the Loveman family, who employed his mother as a cook.

Gaston's formal education ended with the 10th grade. After earning his certificate from the Tuggle Institute (which only went through the 10th grade), he served in the army in France during World War I and then went to work in the mines run by Tennessee Coal, Iron and Railroad Company in Fairfield and Westfield, Alabama.

== Business growth ==
While working in the mines, he hit on the plan of selling lunches to his fellow miners and then branched into loaning money to them at 25% interest. While working in the mines he also conceived of the idea of offering burial insurance to co-workers having noticed that mine widows would come to the mines and to local churches to collect donations in order to bury their husbands and he wondered if people would "give a few dimes into a burial society to bury their dead". As a result, Gaston formed the Booker T. Washington Burial Insurance Company in 1923, which became the Booker T. Washington Insurance Company in 1932.

In 1938, Gaston bought and renovated a property on the edge of Kelly Ingram Park in downtown Birmingham, where, in partnership with his father-in-law, A. L. Smith, he started the Smith & Gaston Funeral Home. Smith & Gaston sponsored gospel music programs on local radio stations and launched a quartet of its own.

Realizing that there were not enough black people with sufficient training to be able to work in the insurance and funeral industries, in 1939 he and his second wife, Minnie L. Gardner Gaston, established the Booker T. Washington business school. (His first wife, Creola Smith Gaston, died in 1938.) Other Gaston enterprises included Citizens Federal Savings and Loan Association, the first black-owned financial institution in Birmingham in more than forty years. On July 1, 1954, Gaston opened the A.G. Gaston Motel on a site adjoining Kelly Ingram Park.

== Political activities ==
Gaston kept a low political profile through most of the 1940s and 1950s. Although he was reluctant to confront white authorities and the white business establishment directly, he supported the civil rights movement financially. He offered financial support to Autherine Lucy, who had sued to integrate the University of Alabama, and had provided financial assistance to residents of Tuskegee who faced foreclosure because of their role in a boycott of white-owned businesses called to protest their disenfranchisement. When Rev. Fred Shuttlesworth, a civil rights leader in Birmingham, founded the Alabama Christian Movement for Human Rights in the wake of the outlawing of the NAACP in the State of Alabama in 1956, the group held its first meeting at Smith & Gaston's offices.

When students at Miles College, a historically black college in Fairfield, attempted to use sit-in and boycott tactics to desegregate downtown Birmingham in 1962, Gaston used his position as a member of the board of trustees of the institution to dissuade them from continuing their campaign while he pursued negotiations with them. Those negotiations produced some token changes, but no significant progress toward desegregating the stores or hiring black employees.

External videos
- “Eyes on the Prize; Interview with A.G. Gaston” conducted in 1985 for the Eyes on the Prize documentary in which he discusses the Birmingham campaign of 1963, financially supporting civil rights activists, and his efforts to reach a negotiated settlement between civil rights activists and the city government, including Bull Connor.

When the Southern Christian Leadership Conference (SCLC), represented locally by Rev. Fred Shuttlesworth, proposed to support those students' demands in 1963 by widespread demonstrations, challenging both Birmingham's segregation laws and Local Police Commissioner Bull Connor's authority, Gaston opposed the plan and tried to deflect the campaign from public confrontation into negotiations with white business leaders. Gaston posted $5000 bail for Dr. Martin Luther King and Reverend Abernathy when they were arrested.

At the same time, Gaston provided King and Rev. Ralph Abernathy with a room at his motel at a discount, and free meeting rooms at his offices nearby throughout the campaign. He maintained a public show of support for the campaign and not only took part in the meetings with local business leaders, but insisted that Shuttlesworth be brought in since "he's the man with the marbles".

That unity nearly dissolved, however, after Abernathy made comments about alleged "Uncle Toms" and Dr. King made a call for unity on April 9, 1963, that made it clear that he would press forward with his plans for confrontation. Gaston issued a press release in response in which he obliquely criticized King by lamenting the lack of communication between white business leaders and "local colored leadership".

That press release exposed a significant rift between the activists in the Civil Rights Movement. Hosea Williams described Gaston as a "super Uncle Tom" to the press while complaining that he overcharged for his motel rooms—despite the fact that Williams, and other civil rights leaders were staying at Gaston's motel free of charge. The leaders of the movement were eager, however, to avoid any public airing of those differences; Shuttlesworth soon apologized, SCLC leaders treated the press release as an expression of support for their campaign while Dr. King announced creation of a special committee of local leaders, including Gaston, to meet every morning to approve each day's plans.

That committee had no real power, however, as became clear when the movement encouraged school children to march against segregation on May 2, 1963. Gaston protested the strategy, telling King: "Let those kids stay in school. They don't know nothing." King replied, "Brother Gaston, let those people go into the streets where they'll learn something." The demonstrations continued.

== Violence against Gaston ==
Because of his stance as a negotiator, Gaston often faced challenges by proponents from both sides of the civil rights issue.

Gaston remained disaffected from Dr. King, urging him to stay away, in a statement released in September 1963, after Dr. King announced plans to return to Birmingham to resume demonstrations.

On May 11, 1963, four people probably associated with the KKK attempted to blow up the part of the A.G. Gaston Motel where King and Abernathy were staying; the home of Martin Luther King's brother Reverend A. D. King was also bombed. Later that night, the bombings sparked riots by African Americans in the community in a 28-block section of Birmingham. The local police officers and state troopers responded to the crisis and subsequently beat rioters and bystanders. More than fifty people were injured as police were dispatched to clear Kelly Ingram Park.

On September 8, 1963, unidentified persons threw firebombs at Gaston's house, a day after he and his wife had attended a state dinner at the White House with President John F. Kennedy.

On the night of January 24, 1976, Gaston and his wife were kidnapped and beaten by an intruder, and Gaston was abducted in his own car; police officers found him two hours later, bound in the back seat of the car.

== Death and legacy ==
Gaston published a memoir in 1968, coinciding with the founding of the A. G. Gaston Boys club.

Gaston famously said, "I never went into anything with the idea of making money...I thought of doing something, and it would come up and make money. I never thought of trying to get rich."

Gaston died in Birmingham, Alabama, on January 19, 1996, at the age of 103. He left behind an insurance company, the Booker T. Washington Insurance Company; a construction firm, the A.G. Gaston Construction Company, Smith and Gaston Funeral Home, and a financial institution, CFS Bancshares. The City of Birmingham owns the motel. His net worth was estimated to be more than $130,000,000 at the time of his death.

He is the subject of the 2004 biography Black Titan: A.G. Gaston and the Making of a Black American Millionaire, written by his niece and grandniece, Carol Jenkins; Elizabeth Gardner Hines.

In 2017, President Barack Obama designated the A.G. Gaston Motel the center of the Birmingham Civil Rights National Monument.
