= Diane McWhorter =

American journalist and author

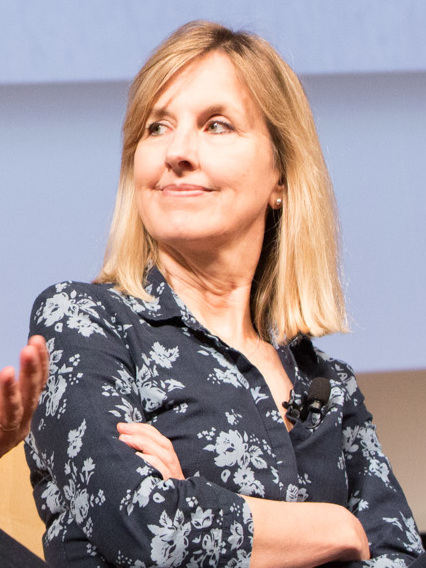
- Born: November 1, 1952 (age 73)
- Occupation: Journalist
- Awards: Guggenheim Fellowship (2009); Pulitzer Prize for General Nonfiction (Carry Me Home, 2002); Berlin Prize (2007); The Hillman Prize for Book Journalism (Carry Me Home, 2002)

Rebecca Diane McWhorter (born November 1, 1952) is an American journalist, commentator, and author who has written extensively about race and the history of civil rights. She won the Pulitzer Prize for General Nonfiction and the J. Anthony Lukas Book Prize in 2002 for Carry Me Home: Birmingham, Alabama, the Climactic Battle of the Civil Rights Revolution (Simon & Schuster, 2001; reprinted with a new afterword, 2013).

== Early life and education ==
McWhorter is from Birmingham, Alabama, where she attended the Brooke Hill School, which is now The Altamont School.

Among McWhorter's elementary school classmates was Mary Badham, who portrayed "Scout" Finch in the 1962 film To Kill a Mockingbird. When the film was released, McWhorter was among the students who went to a viewing of the film as part of a school field trip. She later reflected on that experience:

"By, you know, rooting for a black man, you were kind of betraying every principle that you had been raised to believe, and I remember thinking "what would my father think if he saw me fighting back these tears when Tom Robinson gets shot?" It was a really disturbing experience; to be crying for a black man was so taboo."

McWhorter graduated from Wellesley College in 1974.

== Career ==
External videos
- Booknotes interview with McWhorter on Carry Me Home, May 27, 2001, C-SPAN

McWhorter has written extensively on race and the struggle for civil rights in the US. In 2002 she was awarded both the Pulitzer Prize for General Nonfiction and the J. Anthony Lukas Book Prize for Carry Me Home: Birmingham, Alabama, the Climactic Battle of the Civil Rights Revolution. She is also the author of A Dream of Freedom, a young adult history of the civil rights movement (Scholastic, 2004). She is a long-time contributor to The New York Times and has written for the op-ed page of USA Today and for Slate, Harper's, Smithsonian, among other publications. She is a member of the Board of Contributors for USA Today's Forum Page, part of the newspaper's Opinion section, and has been managing editor of Boston magazine.

She has been a Holtzbrinck Fellow at the American Academy in Berlin, Germany, a Guggenheim Fellow, a resident scholar at the Rockefeller Foundation Bellagio Center, and a Fellow at the Radcliffe Institute for Advanced Study and at the W. E. B. Du Bois Institute at Harvard University. In 2015 she was one of the recipients in the first year of the National Endowment for the Humanities' Public Scholar program to underwrite the production of general-readership nonfiction books by scholars. She is a member of the Society of American Historians. She is working on Moon over Alabama, a study of Wernher von Braun and the US space program in Alabama.

== Personal life ==
She married Richard Dean Rosen in 1987; they have two children.
