= List of unarmed African Americans killed by law enforcement officers in the United States in the 20th century =

This is a list of African Americans reportedly killed while unarmed by non-military law enforcement officers in the United States prior to 2000. Events are listed whether they took place in the line of duty or not, and regardless of reason or method. The listing documents the occurrence of a death, making no implications regarding wrongdoing or justification on the part of the person killed or officer involved. Killings are arranged by date of the incident that caused death.

== List ==
Date	Name	Age	City	Description
March 31, 1870	Henry Truman	26	Philadelphia, Pennsylvania	Officer John Whiteside chased Truman into an alley after a shoplifting. When Truman asked the officer what he did wrong, Whiteside shot him. Whiteside was found guilty of manslaughter.
December 14, 1895	Lizzie Durr	13	Birmingham, Alabama	A police officer shot and killed Durr as she and a friend stole coal from a train car. The officer claimed Durr jumped on him, causing his gun to discharge, but Durr's friend claimed she was shot while they were running away. Durr had been shot in the back of the head.
March 26, 1938	Berry Lawson	21	Seattle, Washington	Three officers beat Lawson to death after removing him from the hotel he worked at. The officers claimed Lawson fell down the stairs and attempted to bribe a witness, but all three were tried and convicted of manslaughter.
March 22, 1942	Thomas P. Foster	25	Little Rock, Arkansas	Two white military police officers and two city police officers beat a black soldier while arresting him for public drunkenness. When Foster, who outranked the military officers, confronted them, the officers attempted to arrest him. City Officer Abner J. Hay fought with Foster near a church, with other officers hitting Foster with batons when it appeared he was winning the fight. When Foster let go of Hay, Hay shot him three times.
January 29, 1943	Robert "Bobby" Hall	~30	Baker County, Georgia	Sheriff Claude Screws and two deputies beat a handcuffed Hall to death on the grounds of the Baker County Courthouse following a personal dispute. Screws's conviction of violating Hall's civil rights was overturned by the United States Supreme Court.
February 2, 1958	Daniel Bell	22	Milwaukee, Wisconsin	Bell fled a traffic stop because he had no license. Officer Thomas Grady shot him and planted a knife on the scene, claiming Bell had lunged at him. Two decades later, the other officer on scene admitted that Grady planted the weapon, and he was convicted of reckless homicide and perjury in 1979.
October 25, 1959	Luther Jackson	27	Philadelphia, Mississippi	Jackson, a veteran of the Korean War, was shot and killed by Officer Lawrence A. Rainey as he exited his vehicle. Rainey would later gain notoriety for his alleged involvement in the Freedom Summer murders.
April 9, 1962	Roman Ducksworth Jr.	30	Taylorsville, Mississippi	Ducksworth, a military police officer, was shot and killed by Taylorsville Police Officer William Kelly after he fell asleep on a bus on the way to the hospital as his child was born.
September 15, 1963	Johnny Robinson	16	Birmingham, Alabama	During unrest over the 16th Street Baptist Church bombing, Robinson and several others threw rocks at a car draped with the Confederate Flag. Officer Jack Parker shot Robinson but claimed that he had only fired a warning shot. Two juries chose not to indict Parker for the shooting.
February 26, 1965	Jimmie Lee Jackson	26	Marion, Alabama	During a peaceful voting rights rally, Alabama State Trooper James Bonard Fowler shot Jackson after another threw him against a cigarette machine. Fowler was not named as the shooter until 2005, and he pled guilty to manslaughter in 2010, serving six months in prison.
May 7, 1966	Leonard Deadwyler	25	Los Angeles, California	Deadwyler was speeding as he drove to the hospital with his wife, who was in labor. An officer shot Deadwyler, claiming the vehicle had lurched forward. A coroner's jury later ruled the shooting an accidental homicide.
September 27, 1966	Matthew Johnson	16	San Francisco, California	Patrolman Alvin Johnson (no relation) shot Matthew as he ran away. The shooting sparked riots in the Hunters Point neighborhood.
May 12, 1967	Benjamin Brown	22	Jackson, Mississippi	Brown was leaving a café on the Jackson State University campus after buying a sandwich for his wife when he encountered a standoff between protesters and police. Police shot him twice in the back, killing him. A 2001 grand jury blamed two policemen, Jackson Police officer Buddy Kane and Mississippi Highway Patrolman Lloyd Jones for Brown's death, but both men had died prior to the grand jury.
June 11, 1967	Martin Chambers	19	Tampa, Florida	Officer James Calvert shot burglary suspect Chambers in the back as he ran away. The shooting led to riots in the city, among over 150 other riots that summer.
July 14, 1967	Eddie Moss	10	Newark, New Jersey	National Guardsmen fired at a vehicle moving through checkpoints, killing Moss.
July 14, 1967	Rufus Council	35	Newark, New Jersey	State troopers shot Council as he stood in the doorframe of a restaurant.
July 14, 1967	Tedock Bell	28	Newark, New Jersey	Bell and his family walked to the tavern he worked at, hoping to check on it. An unidentified officer shot him.
July 14, 1967	Leroy Boyd	34	Newark, New Jersey	An officer shot and killed Boyd. According to a grand jury report the shooting was accidental.
July 14, 1967	Cornelius Murray	29	Newark, New Jersey	Police shot Murray as he stood with his friends.
July 15, 1967	Eloise Spellman	42	Newark, New Jersey	Police and National Guardsmen shot three people in apartments after reports of sniper fire.
July 15, 1967	Rebecca Brown	29	Newark, New Jersey	Police and National Guardsmen shot three people in apartments after reports of sniper fire.
July 15, 1967	Hattie Gainer	53	Newark, New Jersey	Police and National Guardsmen shot three people in apartments after reports of sniper fire.
July 15, 1967	William Furr	25	Newark, New Jersey	Police shot Furr as he fled a looted liquor store.
July 16, 1967	Michael Pugh	12	Newark, New Jersey	National Guardsmen shot Pugh as he went to take his family's garbage out.
July 16, 1967	James Rutledge	19	Newark, New Jersey	State troopers found Rutledge in a liquor store. When he stood up to surrender, police shot him 39 times.
July 17, 1967	Raymond Gilmer	20	Newark, New Jersey	During riots in Newark a police officer shot Gilmer as he fled a store. He was the last person to be killed in the Newark riots.
July 24, 1967	Robert Beal	23	Detroit, Michigan	During the 1967 Detroit riot, a patrolman shot Beal inside a drug store. An initial report said he was shot while fleeing, but a later report said he made a sudden move toward the officers.
July 24, 1967	Joseph Chandler	34	Detroit, Michigan	Two officers shot Chandler as he ran down an alley. After firing the officers left, believing they had missed Chandler.
July 24, 1967	Herman Canty	34	Detroit, Michigan	An officer shot Canty as he drove away from a supermarket, which a witness said he had looted.
July 24, 1967	Alfred Peachlum	36	Detroit, Michigan	Police shot Peachlum inside a grocery store after mistaking a shiny object for a gun. He was holding beef wrapped in tin foil. Police also wounded two women across the street from the store.
July 24, 1967	Alphonso Smith	35	Detroit, Michigan	A patrolman shot Smith in a supermarket. The officer said Smith had thrown a can at him and that he fired after slipping on debris, but witnesses said the officer shot through a window.
July 24, 1967	Mike Williams	16	Detroit, Michigan	A state trooper shot Williams and a 20-year-old man as they fled from a looted warehouse.
July 24, 1967	Edward Kemp	35	Detroit, Michigan	An officer shot Kemp as he fled holding stolen cigars.
July 24, 1967	Richard Sims	35	Detroit, Michigan	Four officers chased Sims for allegedly trying to break into a bar. The officers surrounded him next to a locked door and shot him.
July 24, 1967	Frank Tanner	35	Detroit, Michigan	Police and National Guardsmen fired at a group of people who had allegedly stolen alcohol from a store, killing Tanner. Tanner was holding a cardboard box when he was shot.
July 25, 1967	Henry Denson	27	Detroit, Michigan	National Guardsmen shot at a vehicle driving slowly near a checkpoint, killing Denson, a passenger. The driver of the car was charged with assault but was acquitted.
July 25, 1967	Emanuel Cosbey	26	Detroit, Michigan	Police fired at a group of fleeing looting suspects, killing Cosbey.
July 25, 1967	Ronald Evans	16	Detroit, Michigan	Police arrested Evans and Jones for stealing beer. Officers shot both men, claiming they attempted to run, although witnesses claimed police had forced Evans to run before they shot him.
July 25, 1967	William Jones	23	Detroit, Michigan	Police arrested Evans and Jones for stealing beer. Officers shot both men, claiming they attempted to run, although witnesses claimed police had forced Evans to run before they shot him.
July 25, 1967	Roy Banks	46	Detroit, Michigan	National Guardsmen shot Banks, who was deaf, as he walked to catch a bus to work. Police said he was a suspected looter, but the looted business's owner denied this. Banks died on August 14 from his injuries.
July 25, 1967	Arthur Johnson	36	Detroit, Michigan	Police shot Johnson and Williams inside a looted pawn shop. Police said Johnson had a club, but it was never produced by police.
July 25, 1967	Perry Williams	33	Detroit, Michigan	Police shot Johnson and Williams inside a looted pawn shop. Police said Johnson had a club, but it was never produced by police.
July 25, 1967	Tonia Blanding	4	Detroit, Michigan	The National Guard sent a tank to a neighborhood after rumors of snipers. When someone in an apartment lit a cigarette, National Guardsmen opened fire, mistaking it for a sniper. Blanding was shot and killed.
July 26, 1967	John LeRoy	30	Detroit, Michigan	LeRoy and some friends went to check on a friend's pregnant wife. After getting permission from a National Guardsman to go out past curfew, they passed a National Guard Jeep, where Guardsmen fired at the vehicle, killing LeRoy and wounding two friends, including the one whose wife they were visiting. LeRoy died of his injuries three days later.
July 26, 1967	Carl Cooper	17	Detroit, Michigan	Police shot three teenagers in a motel. Officers were charged with Pollard and Temple's deaths, while another was charged with conspiracy in relation to Cooper's death, but no officer was ever convicted.
July 26, 1967	Aubrey Pollard	19	Detroit, Michigan	Police shot three teenagers in a motel. Officers were charged with Pollard and Temple's deaths, while another was charged with conspiracy in relation to Cooper's death, but no officer was ever convicted.
July 26, 1967	Fred Temple	18	Detroit, Michigan	Police shot three teenagers in a motel. Officers were charged with Pollard and Temple's deaths, while another was charged with conspiracy in relation to Cooper's death, but no officer was ever convicted.
July 26, 1967	George Talbert	20	Detroit, Michigan	A National Guard specialist shot Talbert. The Guardsman claimed Talbert had threatened to cut him, but an investigation by the Detroit Free Press determined he was unarmed. He died of his injuries ten days later.
July 26, 1967	Albert Robinson	38	Detroit, Michigan	National Guardsmen struck Robinson with a bayonette and shot him. Police said he was a sniper trying to escape his apartment, but no weapons were found in the apartment.
July 28, 1967	William Dalton	19	Detroit, Michigan	Police shot Dalton after detaining him for violating curfew. Police said he was fleeing, but witnesses claimed officers had taken him to an alley and shot him.
July 29, 1967	Ernest Roquemore	19	Detroit, Michigan	Police and Army paratroopers opened fire on a crowd of people after a transistor radio was mistaken for a gun. Roquemore was shot and killed.
February 8, 1968	Samuel Ephesians Hammond Jr.	18	Orangeburg, South Carolina	South Carolina Highway Patrol officers shot at a group of protesters at South Carolina State University, killing three.
February 8, 1968	Delano Herman Middleton	17	Orangeburg, South Carolina	South Carolina Highway Patrol officers shot at a group of protesters at South Carolina State University, killing three.
February 8, 1968	Henry Ezekial Smith	19	Orangeburg, South Carolina	South Carolina Highway Patrol officers shot at a group of protesters at South Carolina State University, killing three.
March 9, 1968	William Leonard	19	Los Angeles, California	Police responded to reports of a man threatening to kill his wife. Officer Larry N. Fultz went to question the wife when he shot Leonard through a window. Leonard, who babysat for the family, was standing with his arms raised facing away from the window when he was shot.
March 28, 1968	Larry Payne	18	Memphis, Tennessee	During a sanitation strike Officer Leslie Dean Jones shot Payne in the stomach with a sawed-off shotgun. Jones claimed Payne had a butcher's knife but witnesses disputed this.
April 18, 1968	Roosevelt Jackson	Unknown	Port Gibson, Mississippi	Two weeks after the assassination of Martin Luther King Jr., two police officers attempted to arrest Jackson for interfering with another man's arrest. During his arrest there was a struggle, which ended with police shooting Jackson. Jackson's killing resulted in NAACP protests led by Charles Evers, which then led to the Supreme Court case NAACP v. Claiborne Hardware Co. after local merchants sued the NAACP.
May 18, 1968	Daniel Kenneth Henry	22	Salisbury, Maryland	Plainclothes detective Jerry Mason, who was White, shot Henry following a scuffle with police. Henry had dropped a gun, which was picked up by Mason, and he was unarmed when police yelled at him to stop. Because Henry was deaf, he did not hear their warning, and Mason fired one shot into the back of Henry's neck, killing him instantly. Mason was cleared by a grand jury.
June 24, 1969	Vivian Strong	14	Omaha, Nebraska	Officer James Loder shot into a group of teenagers running away, striking Vivian Strong. Loder was tried for manslaughter but was found not guilty by an all-White jury.
December 4, 1969	Fred Hampton	21	Chicago, Illinois	Hampton, a chairman of the Black Panther Party, was assassinated while he slept in his bed. Hampton was shot multiple times by police who raided his apartment. 22-year-old Mark Clark was also shot and killed.
May 11, 1970	Charlie Mack Murphy	39	Augusta, Georgia	During riots in Augusta, Murphy was walking to his mother's house when police shot him seven times in the back.
May 11, 1970	William Wright	18	Augusta, Georgia	Wright and some friends were watching riots when they noticed police officers through a fence. Wright and his friends ran, and police shot him eight times, five in the back and three in the arm.
May 11, 1970	Sammie McCullough	20	Augusta, Georgia	Police dispersed a group of people near a fire. As McCullough and a friend ran, police opened fire, hitting McCullough and grazing his friend. McCullough died in surgery at Talmadge Hospital.
May 11, 1970	James Stokes	19	Augusta, Georgia	Stokes and a group of other young people were in a grocery store around midnight when a police car drove up and an officer opened fire, killing Stokes. A 12-year-old girl who witnessed his death said that one officer rolled Stokes onto his back with his foot, while another referred to him with a racial slur.
May 12, 1970	John Bennett	28	Augusta, Georgia	Bennett and his cousin left a party and found his car, parked near a looted business and half-filled with groceries from the store. They told two officers that the car was Bennett's, but they did not believe them and began assaulting Bennett. When he ran to a nearby housing project police opened fire, killing Bennett.
May 12, 1970	Mack Wilson	49	Augusta, Georgia	An officer shot Wilson behind a looted bar.
May 15, 1970	Phillip Lafayette Gibbs	21	Jackson, Mississippi	Officers from the Jackson Police Department and the Mississippi Highway Patrol opened fire on student protesters at Jackson State College (now Jackson State University), killing two of them. The shooting occurred 11 days after the Kent State shootings, in which the National Guard similarly fired into a crowd of student protesters, killing four. The two shootings resulted in President Richard Nixon creating the President's Commission on Campus Unrest. In 2021, the mayor of Jackson and a state senator issued an apology for the shootings, and Gibbs and Green were granted posthumous degrees.
May 15, 1970	James Earl Green	17	Jackson, Mississippi	
June 20, 1970	Jerry Lee Amie	24	Los Angeles, California	Police responded to reports of a man with a gun and shot Amie. Police stated Amie reached towards his waistband and had a toy gun on his person, while family stated his hands were raised and the toy gun was planted closer to the scene.
May 31, 1971	Carnell Russ	24	Star City, Arkansas	While driving home with his family after visiting relatives on Memorial Day, Russ was pulled over by Officer Charles Lee Ratliff. Ratliff had Russ drive with him to the Lincoln County Courthouse. After Ratliff refused to provide Russ with a copy of the ticket, he refused to pay, leading to a scuffle. During the struggle Ratliff hit Russ with his gun and shot him. Ratliff was charged with manslaughter but was acquitted by an all-white jury.
November 16, 1972	Leonard Brown	20	Baton Rouge, Louisiana	Police shot Brown and Smith as they and other students at Southern University protested poor funding and educational disparities. In 2017 the two men were awarded posthumous degrees and in 2022 Governor John Bel Edwards apologized for their deaths.
November 16, 1972	Denver Smith	20	Baton Rouge, Louisiana	Police shot Brown and Smith as they and other students at Southern University protested poor funding and educational disparities. In 2017 the two men were awarded posthumous degrees and in 2022 Governor John Bel Edwards apologized for their deaths.
January 27, 1973	Rita Lloyd	16	New York City, New York	A plainclothes officer shot at girl who pointed a sawed-off shotgun at him, hitting Lloyd.
April 28, 1973	Clifford Glover	10	New York City, New York	Two undercover officers approached Glover and his stepfather, believing they had committed a robbery. Believing they were about to be robbed, Glover and his stepfather ran, and police shot Glover. Officers stated they believed Glover had a gun he passed to his stepfather, but no weapon was recovered.
October 3, 1974	Edward Garner	15	Memphis, Tennessee	After stealing $10 and a purse, Garner fled from Officer Elton Hyman by climbing a fence. Hyman shot Garner in the back of the head, saying he did so to prevent him from escaping. The shooting was ruled justified, as Tennessee had a law allowing police to shoot fleeing suspects for any reason. The shooting led to the Supreme Court case Tennessee v. Garner, where justices ruled 6–3 that the law was unconstitutional.
December 2, 1975	Bernard Whitehurst	32	Montgomery, Alabama	Officer Donald Foster shot Whitehurst in the back while investigating a robbery. Police covered the shooting up by planting a gun and claiming Whitehurst had fired at them, but an investigation by the Montgomery Advertiser found he was unarmed.
February 15, 1976	Michael Sherard	16	Philadelphia, Pennsylvania	Policeman Donald Woodruff shot and killed Sherard. After throwing a TV set at Woodruff, Sherard fled and was shot by Woodruff. Woodruff stated he shot Sherard after he pulled his hand out of his pocket, but witnesses said he was fleeing when he was shot. Woodruff was charged but acquitted.
November 25, 1976	Randolph Evans	15	New York City, New York	Officer Robert Torsey shot Evans point-blank in the head after a brief conversation. Torsey was arrested by other officers at the scene and later found not guilty of murder by reason of insanity.
February 27, 1978	Michael Carpenter	19	Philadelphia, Pennsylvania	Officer Marcus Giardino shot Carpenter in the back as he ran away. Giardino pleaded guilty to involuntary manslaughter in 1978, the second time in Philadelphia history an officer was convicted for killing a Black man.
June 14, 1978	Arthur Miller Jr.	34–35	New York City, New York	Miller died after being put in a chokehold by NYPD officers.
September 23, 1978	Cornell Warren	19	Philadelphia, Pennsylvania	After being stopped for a traffic violation, Warren ran from police while handcuffed. Officer Thomas Bower pursued Warren, struck him, and shot him. Bowe was charged in Warren's death but was acquitted.
June 22, 1979	Bonita Carter	20	Birmingham, Alabama	A shooting broke out at a gas station after a customer, Alger Pickett, got into a fight with an employee and returned with a firearm. After running out of bullets, Pickett fled the scene and shouted for someone to move his car so it wouldn't be towed. Carter, who was at the station with her friends, got into the car and began to drive away. Two officers, George Sands and R.W. Hollingsworth, happened to be in the area at the time and saw Carter in Pickett's car. Although bystanders yelled that Carter was not the robber, Sands fired four shots, killing her.
July 19, 1979	Emery Robinson	18	Pelham Manor, New York	After questioning Robinson about a stolen car, Officer John Robins shot Robinson as he ran away, after firing a warning shot.
December 17, 1979	Arthur McDuffie	33	Miami, Florida	McDuffie died after he was beaten by four officers during a traffic stop. The medical examiner concluded that McDuffie's injuries were not consistent with a motorcycle crash, but closer to being beaten.
August 24, 1980	William Green	17	Philadelphia, Pennsylvania	During a traffic stop Officer John Ziegler shot and killed Green. Ziegler stated he was hitting Green with his gun when it went off. Ziegler was charged with murder but was acquitted.
November 4, 1980	Michael Smith	15	Indianapolis, Indiana	Officer Jeffrey Ritorto shot Smith as he fled a burglary unarmed. The officer said he believed Smith was reaching for a weapon.
July 9, 1981	Ernest Lacy	22	Milwaukee, Wisconsin	Police questioned Lacy in connection with a rape. Police handcuffed him and wrestled him to the ground, with one officer pushing his knee into Lacy's back and neck. He fell unconscious and died. Another suspect was later found and convicted of the initial rape.
October 20, 1982	Anthony Nelson	Unknown	Miami, Florida	Officer Ernest Urtiaga was frisking Nelson, suspected of stealing a truck, with a shotgun to his back. According to Urtiaga he felt contact on the shotgun and thought Nelson was trying to take it, so he pulled back and shot him. Urtiaga was charged with manslaughter but was acquitted.
March 4, 1983	Donald Harp	22	Miami, Florida	Following a car accident, Officer Robert Koenig shot Harp. The officer claimed he thought Harp was reaching for a weapon, although a medical examiner said Harp was nearly unconscious at the time. Koenig was convicted of manslaughter and sentenced to seven years in prison.
September 28, 1983	Michael Stewart	25	New York City, New York	
September 21, 1984	Sal Saran Scott	22	Minneapolis, Minnesota	Undercover officers attempted to arrest Scott after he allegedly tried to rob one. During his arrest an officer shot Scott in the back of the head with a shotgun.
April 20, 1985	Lloyd D. Stevenson	31	Portland, Oregon	Stevenson walked into a 7-Eleven and found two White clerks trying to stop a Black suspected shoplifter from leaving. A fight broke out and Stevenson attempted to break it up. When officers arrived, Officer Gary Barbour put Stevenson in a sleeper hold, leading to Stevenson's losing consciousness and dying. An all-white six person jury decided a verdict of criminally negligent homicide, but a grand jury declined to indict the officers.
May 13, 1985	MOVE Bombing	numerous	Philadelphia, Pennsylvania	11 people were killed and over 200 were made homeless when police bombed a residential neighborhood.
April 3, 1986	Erdman Bascomb	41	Seattle, Washington	During a drug raid on a Genesee apartment, police burst in and shot Bascomb in the chest. Bascomb was holding a black TV remote, which the officer who shot him said he mistook for a gun.
April 3, 1986	Robert V. Logan	Unknown	Indianapolis, Indiana	An officer shot Logan in the back while trying to handcuff him.
December 9, 1987	Yvonne Smallwood	28	New York City, New York	Died from a blood-clot while in police custody. Smallwood's boyfriend and another witness said they saw police kick and beat Smallwood days before her death.
January 16, 1989	Clement Lloyd	23	Miami, Florida	Officer William Lozano shot and killed Lloyd as he fled police on a motorcycle. The crash also killed Blanchard, Lloyd's passenger. Lozano was convicted of manslaughter but the verdict was overturned and Lozano was acquitted.
January 16, 1989	Allan Blanchard	24	Miami, Florida	Officer William Lozano shot and killed Lloyd as he fled police on a motorcycle. The crash also killed Blanchard, Lloyd's passenger. Lozano was convicted of manslaughter but the verdict was overturned and Lozano was acquitted.
January 25, 1989	Lloyd Smalley	71	Minneapolis, Minnesota	During a raid, police launched a stun grenade into an apartment where several people, including Smalley and Weiss, were staying. The stun grenade sparked a fire, which killed both Smalley and Weiss.
January 25, 1989	Lillian Weiss	65	Minneapolis, Minnesota	During a raid, police launched a stun grenade into an apartment where several people, including Smalley and Weiss, were staying. The stun grenade sparked a fire, which killed both Smalley and Weiss.
March 22, 1990	Adolph Archie	40	New Orleans, Louisiana	Archie died after being severely beaten to death at a New Orleans police station. Archie's injuries included a fractured skull, kicked in teeth, a fractured larynx, and severely hemorrhaged testicles. Archie was suspected of fatally shooting NOPD Police Officer Earl Hauck earlier on the same day.
April 10, 1990	Phillip Pannell	16	Teaneck, New Jersey	16-year-old Phillip Pannell was shot in his back with his hands raised by Officer Gary Spath.
July 9, 1990	Leonard Bennett	25	Indianapolis, Indiana	Following a robbery at a restaurant police pursued Bennett. When the pursuit ended Officer Scott Haslar shot Bennett five times. Bennett was unarmed when he was shot.
May 4, 1991	Grady Alexis	26	New York City, New York	Following a traffic dispute, off-duty officer and professional boxer Richard Frazier struck Alexis in the head, killing him. The officer was charged with assault against one of Alexis's friends, but not for Alexis himself. One of Frazier's friends was charged with assaulting Alexis and was sentenced to jail for four months and community service.
July 12, 1991	Christopher Rogers	16	Boston, Massachusetts	Officer James E. "Sonny" Hall shot and killed Rogers as he hid under a truck in the Dorchester neighborhood. Hall, a Black officer who claimed he shot Rogers after losing his balance, was convicted of manslaughter in 1992 and sentenced to five to ten and a half years in prison.
September 2, 1991	Steve Clemons	27	Los Angeles, California	Clemons was shot in the back while fleeing by LASD Deputy Michael Staley in Los Angeles's Willowbrook Park.
December 30, 1991	Roy Lee Jones	25	Cairo, Illinois	Officer John McDonald stopped Jones and questioned him about a robbery. After Jones refused to answer questions, he attempted to leave, resulting in a scuffle between him and McDonald. McDonald shot thirteen times, missing each time, before shooting a fourteenth time, which hit Jones, killing him. McDonalds claimed his supervisor had told him to fire the last shot, although his supervisor disputed this. McDonald was convicted of second-degree murder and aggravated battery and sentenced to ten years in prison.
April 30, 1992	Brian Edmund Andrew	30	Compton, California	During the 1992 Los Angeles riots a Compton Police officer shot Andrew during a fight in an alley. Andrew had been seen running with a beer bottle and a pair of shoes.
May 1, 1992	Charles William Orebo	21	Los Angeles, California	While driving to a home, Orebo cut off an LAPD officer commuting to work. As the officer pulled up next to Orebo, his passenger pointed a gun at the officer, who shot and killed Orebo. Orebo himself was unarmed.
May 1, 1992	Howard Eugene Martin	22	Pasadena, California	Police attempted to disperse a party when gunshots were fired. Police returned fire and one of the shots ricocheted off of the pavement, striking Martin, an uninvolved bystander watching from his friend's balcony.
July 1, 1992	John L. Daniels Jr.	36	Los Angeles, California	Officer Douglas Iversen and his partner spotted Daniels at a gas station driving his tow truck, which had been mistakenly released to him after being seized. When Daniels attempted to drive off, Iversen shot him. Iversen was charged with murder but was not convicted.
November 5, 1992	Malice Green	35	Detroit, Michigan	Officers Walter Budzyn and Larry Nevers repeatedly struck Green with a flashlight, leading to his death. Budzyn and Nevers were convicted of guilty of second-degree murder, another officer was acquitted of assault, and a fourth had charges dropped.
December 2, 1992	Marshall Smith Jr	Unknown	Albuquerque, New Mexico	Albuquerque SWAT police Officer Steve Rodriguez shot Smith while on a bridge. Marshall was possibly on the bridge to commit suicide or to throw his daughter off the bridge.
April 15, 1993	Paul Monroe	23	Austin, Texas	Officer Steven Deaton shot Monroe in the abdomen as he got on the ground after dropping a bag.
April 17, 1993	Simmont Donta Thomas	14	Baltimore, Maryland	Officer Edward T. Gorwell II shot Thomas as he and several other teenagers fled from a stolen car. Gorwell claimed he thought he heard a gunshot before he fired, but no witnesses were found who verified this, and no gun was found at the scene. Gorwell was charged with manslaughter but charges were dropped.
May 25, 1993	Johnnie Cromartie	40	New York City, New York	Cromartie was admitted to New York Downtown Hospital after suffering from an epileptic seizure during an arrest for carrying a revolver. Reports say when Cromartie was transferred to another room (lacking handcuffs so he could use the bathroom), Cromartie allegedly announced that he wanted to leave. Four NYPD officers then confronted Cromartie, causing a violent confrontation to ensue. A lawyer for Cromartie's mother said, while Cromartie was handcuffed to the floor, two white officers stomped and kicked Cromartie while referring him as a "nigger". Cromartie stopped moving after one officer kicked Cromartie, who was in a prone position, in the neck using both feet.
July 30, 1993	Don Myrick	53	Los Angeles, California	During a narcotics investigation Officer Gary Barbaro shot musician Don Myrick after mistaking a butane lighter for a gun.
October 24, 1993	Lester Steven Yarbrough	34	Mount Vernon, New York	Yarbrough died after officers from the Mount Vernon Police Department pepper-sprayed Yarbrough at his apartment, causing him to go into cardiac arrest.
December 19, 1993	Windy Gail Thompson	32	Charlotte, North Carolina	Police pursued Thompson after she drove away from a traffic stop. Following the chase Thompson crashed into a telephone pole. When she attempted to drive away, an officer shot and killed her.
January 11, 1994	Shu'aib Abdul-Latif	17	New York City, New York	During a building search an officer struggled with Abdul-Latif. Abdul-Latif freed himself and ran away, bumping into two other officers, who fired.
March 24, 1994	Accelyne Williams	75	Boston, Massachusetts	Police conducted a no-knock raid on Rev. Williams’ home. He was tackled, and his hands were tied behind his back. He collapsed and died of a heart attack. No guns or drugs were found, as the police had raided the wrong apartment.
April 2, 1994	Preston Tate	26	Corcoran, California	A correctional officer at Corcoran State Prison fatally shot Tate in the head while he reported breaking up a fight.
April 29, 1994	Ernest Sayon	22	New York City, New York	After a firecracker exploded in the Clifton neighborhood of Staten Island, Sayon walked towards officers with his hands in his shirt. Police handcuffed and beat Sayon, who later died. His death was ruled a homicide due to "asphyxia by compression of the chest and neck while rear-handcuffed and prone on the ground".
August 27, 1994	Edward Mallet	25	Phoenix, Arizona	Edward, who had both legs amputated, died after Phoenix Police officers pepper sprayed, and placed him in a chokehold. In 1998, Mallet's family received $45 million in a civil suit against the city.
September 27, 1994	Nicholas Heyward Jr.	13	New York City, New York	Heyward and several friends were playing cops and robbers with toy guns when a housing police officer shot him in a stairwell. The case was reopened in 2016 but the officer was not charged.
October 24, 1994	Anthony Merisier	25	New York City, New York	Merisier died after being shot by a NYPD officer during a traffic stop. No weapons were recovered.
December 7, 1994	Eric Pitt	27	New York City, New York	Following a chase for a shooting, police shot Pitt and Taylor after one of them reached under his car seat. No weapons were found in the vehicle.
December 7, 1994	Donald Taylor	30	New York City, New York	Following a chase for a shooting, police shot Pitt and Taylor after one of them reached under his car seat. No weapons were found in the vehicle.
January 28, 1995	Dan Davis	26	Birmingham, Alabama	Officer Charles Forbes approached Davis and several others he believed were conducting a drug deal. When Davis argued with Forbes, the two fought, and Forbes shot Davis three times. He was convicted of manslaughter.
February 21, 1995	Lawrence Meyers	16	Paterson, New Jersey	A housing police officer shot and killed Meyers during a narcotics operation as the officer subdued him, hitting Meyers in the back of the head. Protests broke out in Paterson in response to the shooting.
April 6, 1995	Jerry Jackson	44	Pittsburgh, Pennsylvania	Police pursued Jackson for driving the wrong way down a one-way street. When Jackson was driving in a tunnel, police fired at least 51 shots, with Pittsburgh Housing Authority Officer John Charmo firing thirteen times. Charmo later pled guilty to involuntary manslaughter.
July 30, 1995	Joseph Gould	36	Chicago, Illinois	Gould, a homeless man, approached off-duty Officer Gregory Becker and asked for money to clean Becker's windshield. An argument broke out and Becker took a handgun from his car trunk. There was a struggle and Becker shot Gould before driving away without reporting the shooting.
October 12, 1995	Jonny Gammage	31	Pittsburgh, Pennsylvania	Gammage was pulled over by a Brentwood Police officer and a struggle ensued. Several more officers arrived from Brentwood and Baldwin, and Gammage died during the struggle. Gammage's death was ruled a homicide due to asphyxiation due to pressure applied on the chest and neck. Officers Milton Mullholland, Michael Albert, and John Vojtas were tried for manslaughter, but none were convicted.
January 15, 1996	Edward Anderson	Unknown	Seattle, Washington	Police responded to a home and found the homeowner yelling that Anderson was trying to kill him. Officers chased Anderson, who tried to jump a nearby fence. He fell on his back on the ground, and shortly after an officer pursuing Anderson shot him in the neck. An inquest jury found the shooting unintentional.
February 13, 1996	Christopher Thomas	28	Paterson, New Jersey	A housing police officer, Philip Perrone, responded to reports of a burglary and encountered Thomas. Perrone and Thomas struggled, and the officer accidentally shot Thomas in the back of the head.
April 9, 1996	Eric Smith	22	Forest View, Illinois	Smith, who was deaf, was shot and killed by Forest View police officer Robert Lawruk after disputed circumstances. Months before the shooting, Smith was brutalized by police in DC.
July 4, 1996	Nathaniel Levi Gaines	25	New York City, New York	Officer Paolo Colecchia shot Gaines in the back at a subway station. Colecchia admitted he was not in fear of his life when he fired and was later convicted in his death.
November 19, 1996	James Cooper	19	Charlotte, North Carolina	An officer pulled Cooper over as he drove with his four-year-old daughter. During the traffic stop Cooper exited his vehicle, and the officer shot him after he leaned into the car and reached into his pants.
March 22, 1997	Frankie Ann Perkins	37	Chicago, Illinois	Jones's death is disputed. Police say Jones died from choked to death on a plastic bag of crack cocaine. But others say Officer Robert Hofer and Officer Joseph McCarthy ran up to Perkins, threw her down, put a knee on her chest, choked her and yelled "spit it out."
April 9, 1997	Carolyn Sue Boetticher	48	Charlotte, North Carolina	Two officers shot and killed Boetticher at a license checkpoint after she allegedly swerved towards an officer.
April 26, 1997	Dwight Stiggons	18	West Covina, California	West Covina police begin chasing Stiggons after allegedly witnessing him jaywalk. They later cornered Stiggons and fatally shot him because they thought he reached for a gun. Stiggons only had a bible on his person.
July 4, 1997	Malik Jones	21	New Haven, Connecticut	Following reports of a vehicle driving erratically, officers boxed it in at a parking lot. After Jones's vehicle backed into East Haven Officer Robert Flodquist's vehicle, Jones drove forward, and Flodquist broke Jones's window and shot him.
October 19, 1997	Kevin Robinson	33	Los Angeles, California	For reasons unknown, Robinson was fatally shot in the back by an LAPD officer. Robinson was reportedly denied paramedic services and bled to death.
December 25, 1997	William J. Whitfield	22	New York City, New York	Police responded to a domestic dispute and heard gunshots. As other officers responded, Whitfield, who had no connection to the shooting, walked outside to call his mother on a payphone. When officers told him to stop he fled, running into a grocery store. In the store Whitfield hid behind a couch. When he stood up, an officer shouted "Drop!" and shot him once.
Aug. 14, 1998	Justin H. Smith	24	Tulsa, Oklahoma	Following a headlight malfunction on Smith's automobile and his refusal to pull over on a rural road where there were no possible witnesses, sheriffs rammed his car and a high-speed chase ensued. When he stopped the car in a residential area, Justin was severely beaten by five Tulsa County Sheriffs while he was unarmed and handcuffed. He died when he could no longer breathe after one of the officers choked him and his larynx was crushed.
October 1, 1998	Donta Dawson	19	Philadelphia, Pennsylvania	Officer Christopher DiPasquale shot Dawson in the head during a traffic stop. DiPasquale was charged with manslaughter but the charges were dropped.
December 21, 1998	Deron Grimmitt	32	Pittsburgh, Pennsylvania	During a vehicle chase, Grimmitt was driving down a road when Officer Jeffrey Cooperstein, standing outside a police vehicle on the other side of the road, opened fire. Grimmitt was killed and his brother was wounded when the vehicle crashed. Cooperstein, who had been accused of creating a racist website towards black people, was charged with homicide and assault but was acquitted.
December 29, 1998	Franklyn Reid	27	New Milford, Connecticut	Following a chase officer Scott B. Smith stepped on Reid's back and shot him as he laid on the ground with his hands behind his back. Reid was unarmed but there was a pocket knife in his jacket, found nearby. Smith pled no contest to a charge of criminally negligent homicide.
February 4, 1999	Amadou Diallo	23	New York City, New York	Amadou Diallo was a Guinean student who was shot 41 times by four NYPD plainclothes officers in the vestibule of his apartment on February 4, 1999. The four officers were charged with second-degree murder, but were acquitted of all charges by a jury after just three days of deliberation.
April 13, 1999	Aquan Salmon	14	Hartford, Connecticut	Officer Robert Allan shot Salmon as he and three other young people suspected of a robbery fled. No gun was found, but two gun-shaped cigarette lighters were recovered.
May 13, 1999	Desmond Rudolph	18	Louisville, Kentucky	Police attempted to arrest Rudolph for stealing a van. Two officers shot and killed Rudolph after the van got stuck in an alleyway, saying they believed Rudolph was going to run them over. The two officers were given awards for the shooting, leading Mayor David L. Armstrong to fire Police Chief Gene Sherrard the next day.
June 3, 1999	Stanton L. Crew	31	Parsippany–Troy Hills, New Jersey	Police pursued Crew and a passenger on the Interstate 80 for erratic driving. After the vehicle was forced off the road, Crew attempted to drive past several police cars, striking two of them. Police shot into the vehicle, killing Crew and wounding the passenger.
June 4, 1999	LaTanya Haggerty	26	Chicago, Illinois	Haggerty was shot and killed after Officer Serena Daniels mistook an object in her right hand for a gun. Haggerty had a cell phone in her left hand, but witnesses say they did not see her holding anything in her right hand.
June 5, 1999	Robert Russ	22	Chicago, Illinois	Police pursued Russ, a linebacker at Northwestern University, after he fled a traffic stop. Following the pursuit, Russ crashed and Officer Van Watts IV smashed the rear driver's side window with a tire iron. Watts claimed Russ attempted to grab his gun, though a witness disputed this. No charges were filed against Watts, but a jury awarded his son nearly $10 million in a lawsuit.
June 14, 1999	Gregory Riley	31	Chicago, Illinois	Police attempted to arrest Riley during a drug investigation, during which he died. The medical examiner ruled his death a homicide due to pressure on his neck and chest, likely caused by the officers' arms and bodies as they tried to arrest him.
July 24, 1999	Demetrius DuBose	28	San Diego, California	Officers Timothy Keating and Robert Wills shot and killed NFL linebacker Demetrius DuBose after he accidentally walked into the house next to the vacation rental he was staying at. DuBose was shot 12 times, including five times in the back. A federal jury ruled that the two officers acted reasonably.
September 10, 1999	Mardio House	Unknown	Baltimore, Maryland	Police and DEA agents attempted to apprehend House for skipping a court appointment. An officer shot and killed House after he jumped out holding a black object. House was holding a cell phone.
September 20, 1999	Antonio Butler	19	Miami, Florida	Officer Juan Mendez shot and killed Butler. Mendez stated he believed Butler was reaching for a gun, but he was unarmed. Mendez was involved in six previous shootings, killing three other people.

== See also ==
- Driving while black
- Shooting bias
- Racism against African Americans
- The talk (racism in the United States)
- Police brutality in the United States
- Police use of deadly force in the United States
- List of lynching victims in the United States
