= Dwight Gooden =

American baseball player (born 1964)

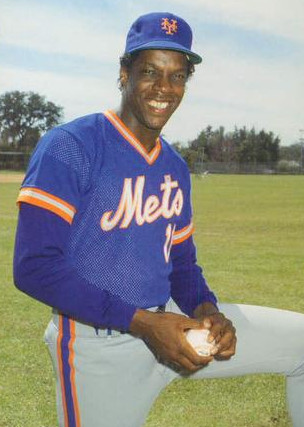
- Gooden with the New York Mets in 1986
- Pitcher
- Born: November 16, 1964 (age 62); Tampa, Florida, U.S.
- Batted: Right Threw: Right

MLB debut
- April 7, 1984, for the New York Mets

Last MLB appearance
- September 29, 2000, for the New York Yankees

MLB statistics
- Win–loss record: 194–112
- Earned run average: 3.51
- Strikeouts: 2,293
- Stats at Baseball Reference

Teams
- New York Mets (1984–1994); New York Yankees (1996–1997); Cleveland Indians (1998–1999); Houston Astros (2000); Tampa Bay Devil Rays (2000); New York Yankees (2000)

Career highlights and awards
- 4× All-Star (1984–1986, 1988); 2× World Series champion (1986, 2000); NL Cy Young Award (1985); Triple Crown (1985); NL Rookie of the Year (1984); Silver Slugger Award (1992); MLB wins leader (1985); MLB ERA leader (1985); 2× MLB strikeout leader (1984, 1985); Pitched a no-hitter on May 14, 1996; New York Mets No. 16 retired; New York Mets Hall of Fame

Dwight Eugene Gooden (born November 16, 1964), nicknamed "Dr. K" and "Doc", is an American former professional baseball pitcher who played 16 seasons in Major League Baseball (MLB). Gooden pitched from 1984 to 1994 and from 1996 to 2000 for the New York Mets, New York Yankees, Cleveland Indians, Houston Astros, and Tampa Bay Devil Rays. In a career spanning 430 games, he pitched 2,800 2/3 innings and posted a win–loss record of 194–112, with a 3.51 earned run average (ERA), and 2,293 strikeouts.

Gooden made his MLB debut in 1984 for the Mets and quickly established himself as one of the league's most talented pitchers; as a 19-year-old rookie, he earned the first of four All-Star selections, won the National League (NL) Rookie of the Year Award, and led the league in strikeouts. In 1985, he won the NL Cy Young Award and achieved the pitching Triple Crown, compiling a 24–4 record and a league-leading 1.53 ERA, 268 strikeouts, and 16 complete games. The following season, he helped the Mets win the 1986 World Series.

Gooden remained an effective pitcher in subsequent years, but his career was ultimately derailed by cocaine and alcohol addiction. After posting a losing record in each season from 1992 to 1994, Gooden was suspended for the 1995 season after a positive drug test while serving a prior suspension. As a member of the Yankees in 1996, Gooden pitched a no-hitter and helped the team on its path to a World Series championship. He pitched four additional years for as many teams, but never approached the success of his peak years with the Mets. In 2010, Gooden was inducted into the New York Mets Hall of Fame and on April 14, 2024, Gooden's number 16 was retired by the New York Mets. Gooden's troubles with addiction continued after his retirement from baseball and resulted in several arrests. He was incarcerated for seven months in 2006 after violating the terms of his probation.

== Career ==
Gooden attended Hillsborough High School in Tampa where he was teammates on the school's baseball team with Vance Lovelace. A native of Tampa, Florida, Dwight Gooden was drafted in the first round in 1982, the fifth player taken overall. He spent two seasons in the minors, 1982 in which he went 5-5 combined between Kingsport and Little Falls and in 1983 in which he led the Class-A Carolina League in wins, strikeouts and ERA while playing for the Lynchburg Mets. Gooden had 300 strikeouts in 191 innings, a performance which convinced Triple-A Tidewater Tides manager and future Mets manager Davey Johnson to bring him up for the Tides' postseason.

=== 1984–1994: New York Mets ===
==== 1984 ====
Gooden made the rare jump from High-A directly to the major leagues in one year, bypassing Double-A and Triple-A. He made his major-league debut on April 7, 1984, with the New York Mets at the age of 19. He quickly developed a reputation with his 98 miles per hour (158 km/h) fastball and sweeping curveball, which was given the superlative nickname of "Lord Charles", in contrast with "Uncle Charlie", a common nickname for a curveball. He was dubbed "Dr. K", in reference to the letter "K" being the standard abbreviation for strikeout, which soon became shortened to "Doc". Gooden soon attracted a rooting section at Shea Stadium that called itself "The K Korner", and would hang up cards with a red "K" after each of his strikeouts.

When he took the mound in the fifth inning on July 10, 1984, Gooden became the youngest player to appear in an All-Star Game. He complemented this distinction by striking out the side, AL batters: Lance Parrish, Chet Lemon, and Alvin Davis. Setting up Gooden, NL Pitcher Fernando Valenzuela had already struck out the side in the fourth, putting down future Hall of Famers Dave Winfield, Reggie Jackson, and George Brett. The two pitchers' combined performance broke an All-Star game record, coincidentally on its celebrated 50th anniversary—Carl Hubbell's five consecutive strikeouts in 1934.

That season, Gooden won 17 games, the most by a 19-year-old since Wally Bunker won 19 games in 1964 and the second most for a Mets rookie, after Jerry Koosman's 19 wins in 1968. Gooden won eight of his last nine starts; in his final three starts of the 1984 season, he had 41 strikeouts and 1 walk. Gooden led the league in strikeouts, his 276 breaking Herb Score's rookie record of 245 in 1955, and also set the record for most strikeouts in three consecutive starts with 43. As a 19-year-old rookie, Gooden set the then-major league record for strikeouts per 9 innings, with 11.39, breaking Sam McDowell's record of 10.71 in 1965. He was voted the Rookie of the Year, giving the Mets two consecutive winners of that award (Darryl Strawberry had been the recipient in 1983). Gooden also became the third Mets pitcher to win the award, joining Tom Seaver (1967) and Jon Matlack (1972). Gooden finished second in the NL Cy Young Award voting, even though he had more wins, strikeouts, and innings pitched as well as a lower ERA than the NL winner, Rick Sutcliffe.

==== 1985 ====
In 1985, Gooden pitched one of the most statistically dominant single seasons in baseball history. Leading Major League Baseball with 24 wins, 268 strikeouts, and a 1.53 ERA, the second-lowest in the live-ball era, trailing only Bob Gibson's 1.12 in 1968. Gooden earned the major leagues' pitching Triple Crown. He led the National League in complete games (16) and innings pitched (276 2/3). After his first start, his ERA never rose above 2.00. At age 20, he was the youngest pitcher of the last half-century to have an ERA+ above 200. Gooden's ERA+ was 229; 23-year-old Dean Chance (200 ERA+ in 1964) was the only other pitcher under the age of 25 to do so. From August 31 through September 16, Gooden threw 31 consecutive scoreless innings over four games, and through October 2, threw 49 consecutive innings over seven games without allowing an earned run. Gooden had one of the highest quality start percentages in a season, with 33 quality starts in 35 games.

In September, he pitched back-to-back nine-inning games allowing no runs, but received no-decisions in both games. In his four losses, Gooden allowed 26 hits and five walks in 28 innings, with 28 strikeouts and a 2.89 ERA. The Mets finished second in the 1985 NL East. Teammates jokingly blamed Gooden for having lost 4 games, thereby mathematically costing them the division title. That year, Gooden became one of only 15 black pitchers ever to win 20 games in a season, the most recent of whom was David Price. Gooden became the youngest-ever recipient of the Cy Young Award and Pitcher of the Year Award, and was also named the Associated Press Athlete of the Year. That November, Gooden turned 21.

Travelers descending the steps of the side entrance to Manhattan's Penn Station were greeted by an enormous photograph of Gooden in mid-motion that recorded his season's strikeout totals as the year progressed. Likewise, those strolling the streets of Manhattan's West Side could gaze up at a 102 feet tall Sports Illustrated mural of Gooden painted on the side of a building at 351 West 42nd Street in Times Square, whose caption asked "How does it feel to look down the barrel of a loaded gun?" In a span of 50 starts from August 11, 1984, to May 6, 1986, Gooden posted a record of 37–5 with a 1.38 ERA; he had 412 strikeouts and 90 walks in 406 innings.

==== 1986 ====
In 1986, he compiled a 17–6 record. Gooden's 200 strikeouts were fifth in the National League, more than a hundred behind the league leader, Mike Scott of the Houston Astros and a tremendous decrease from his first two seasons. As the 1986 season progressed, Gooden felt that his fastball became less effective. “That impossible-to-track, impossible-to-time movement deserted me in 1986, and never returned,” he said. Gooden had compiled a strikeouts per nine innings pitched of 10.05 for his first two seasons. For the rest of his career, he would strike out only 5.91 batters per nine innings.

In another All-Star record, in 1986 Gooden became the youngest pitcher to start an All-Star Game at 21 years, 241 days of age. Gooden was the Mets ace going into the playoffs, and his postseason started promisingly. He lost a 1–0 duel with Scott in the NLCS opener, then got a no-decision in Game 5, pitching 10 innings of one-run ball. He was substantially worse in the World Series against the Boston Red Sox, not getting past the 5th inning in either of his two starts. Nevertheless, the Mets won four of the five non-Gooden starts and the championship. Gooden did not attend the team's victory parade; in 2011, he said that during the parade, he had been using drugs at his dealer's apartment.

==== 1987: Early drug problems and injuries ====
Gooden was arrested on December 13, 1986, in Tampa, Florida after being assaulted by police. A report clearing police of misconduct in the arrest helped start the 1987 Tampa riots. Gooden tested positive for cocaine during spring training in 1987. He entered a rehabilitation center on April 1 to avoid being suspended. He did not make his first start of the season until June 5. Despite missing a third of the season, Gooden won 15 games for the 1987 Mets. In 1988, he was profiled in the William Goldman and Mike Lupica book Wait Till Next Year, which looked at the impact Gooden's drug use and enforced missed games had on the Mets over the 1987 season.

==== 1988 ====
In 1988, Gooden had an 18–9 record as the Mets returned to the postseason. In the first game of the NLCS against the Los Angeles Dodgers, Gooden was matched against Orel Hershiser, who had just finished the regular season with a 59-inning scoreless streak. Gooden pitched well, allowing just 4 hits and recording 10 strikeouts, but left after seven innings trailing 2–0. In his next start in Game 4, Gooden entered the ninth inning with a 4–2 lead and the chance to give his Mets a commanding 3–1 advantage in the series. But he allowed a game-tying home run to Mike Scioscia, and the Dodgers eventually went on to win the game in 12 innings, and ultimately the series as well, 4 games to 3.

==== 1989–1991 ====
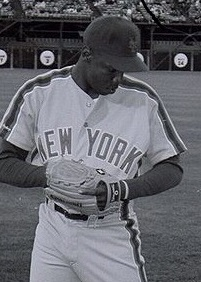
Gooden with the Mets in 1991

Gooden suffered a shoulder injury in 1989, which limited him to just 17 starts, during which he posted a 9–4 record. He rebounded in 1990, posting a 19–7 season with 223 strikeouts, tied for second behind teammate David Cone's 233. However, after another injury in 1991, Gooden's career declined significantly. Though drug abuse is commonly blamed for Gooden's pitching troubles, some analysts point to his early workload. It has been estimated that Gooden threw over 10,800 pitches from 1983 to 1985, a period in which he was 18 to 20 years old. Gooden hurled 276 2/3 innings in his historic 1985 season; As of the end of the 2024 season, only two pitchers have since thrown that many innings: Charlie Hough, a knuckleballer, and Roger Clemens, both in 1987. By the time he reached his 21st birthday, Gooden already had 928 strikeouts between the minor and major leagues.

On August 9, 1990, Phillies pitcher Pat Combs struck Gooden in the knee with the first pitch of the bottom of the fifth inning. Gooden, seeing the pitch as retaliation for him having hit two Phillies batters, charged the mound, setting off a bench-clearing brawl. Gooden was one of six players ejected.

Gooden was accused of rape along with teammates Vince Coleman and Daryl Boston in 1991; however, authorities questioned the alleged victim and found insufficient evidence to charge anyone.

==== 1992–1995 ====
Gooden's first-ever losing season (10–13) was in 1992; it was also the first time he had at least 10 losses. Before the 1993 season, Sports Illustrated ran a cover story on Gooden entitled, "From Phenom to Phantom." The next year was no improvement, as Gooden finished 12–15.

During the strike-shortened 1994 season at age 29, Gooden had a 3–4 record with a 6.31 ERA when he tested positive for cocaine use and was suspended for 60 days. He tested positive again while serving the suspension, and was further suspended for the entire 1995 season. The day after receiving the second suspension, Gooden's wife, Monica, found him in his bedroom with a loaded gun to his head.

In July 1995, the famous longstanding Gooden Times Square mural was replaced with a Charles Oakley mural. The Dwight Gooden mural was a part of the New York City landscape for more than 10 years.

Kirk Radomski, the New York Mets clubhouse attendant whose allegations are at the base of the Mitchell Report, later claimed that he took two urine tests for Gooden during the 1990s. Gooden denied the allegations.

=== 1996–1997: New York Yankees ===
Gooden signed with the New York Yankees in 1996 as a free agent. After pitching poorly in April and nearly getting released, he was sent down to the minors where he worked on his mechanics and soon returned with a shortened wind-up. He no-hit the Seattle Mariners 2–0 at Yankee Stadium on May 14; the no-hitter was the first by a Yankee right-hander since Don Larsen's perfect game in the 1956 World Series and the first by a Yankee right-hander during the regular season since Allie Reynolds' second no-hitter in 1951. He ended the 1996 season at 11–7, his first winning record since 1991, and showed flashes of his early form, going 10–2 with a 3.09 ERA from April 27 through August 12. He proved to be a valuable asset for the Yankees that season as David Cone was out until early September with an aneurysm in his shoulder.

Gooden was left off the 1996 postseason roster due to injury and fatigue. In 1997, he posted a respectable 9–5 record with a 4.91 ERA. He had one start for the Yankees in the 1997 ALDS against the Cleveland Indians; coincidentally, he again faced his 1988 postseason nemesis Orel Hershiser. Gooden left Game 4 during the sixth inning with a 2–1 lead, but the Yankee bullpen faltered in the 8th, and Gooden was left with the no-decision.

=== 1998–1999: Cleveland Indians ===
Gooden then signed with Cleveland and enjoyed moderate success in 1998, going 8–6 with a 3.76 ERA. He started two games in the 1998 postseason, getting a no-decision against the Boston Red Sox and a loss to his former team, the Yankees. He remained with the Indians in 1999 but did not match his respectable numbers from the previous year, going 3–4 with a 6.26 ERA.

In 1999, Gooden released an autobiography titled Heat, in which he discussed his struggles with alcohol and cocaine abuse.

=== 2000–2001: Houston, Tampa Bay, and New York Yankees (second stint) ===
Gooden began the 2000 season with two subpar stints with the Houston Astros and Tampa Bay Devil Rays but found himself back with the Yankees mid-season. He would go on to have a respectable return with the Yankees, going 4–2 with a 3.36 ERA as a spot starter and long reliever, including a win against his former team, the Mets, on July 8 in the regular-season Subway Series. He made one relief appearance in each of the first two rounds of the playoffs, both times with the Yankees trailing. Gooden did not pitch in the 2000 World Series against the Mets, though 2000 would be the second time Gooden received a World Series ring in his career.

=== Postseason career ===
Gooden failed to win a postseason game, going 0–4 in the course of nine postseason starts over eight series. In the 1986 National League Championship Series, however, he had an earned run average of only 1.06 after starting two games and allowing just two earned runs in 17 innings pitched.

=== Batting and fielding ===
For a pitcher, Gooden was an above average hitter, posting a .196 batting average (145-for-741) with 60 runs, 15 doubles, 5 triples, 8 home runs, 67 RBI, and 14 bases on balls. He recorded a .950 fielding percentage, which was five points lower than the league average at his position.

=== Retirement ===
Dwight Gooden on September 28, 2008

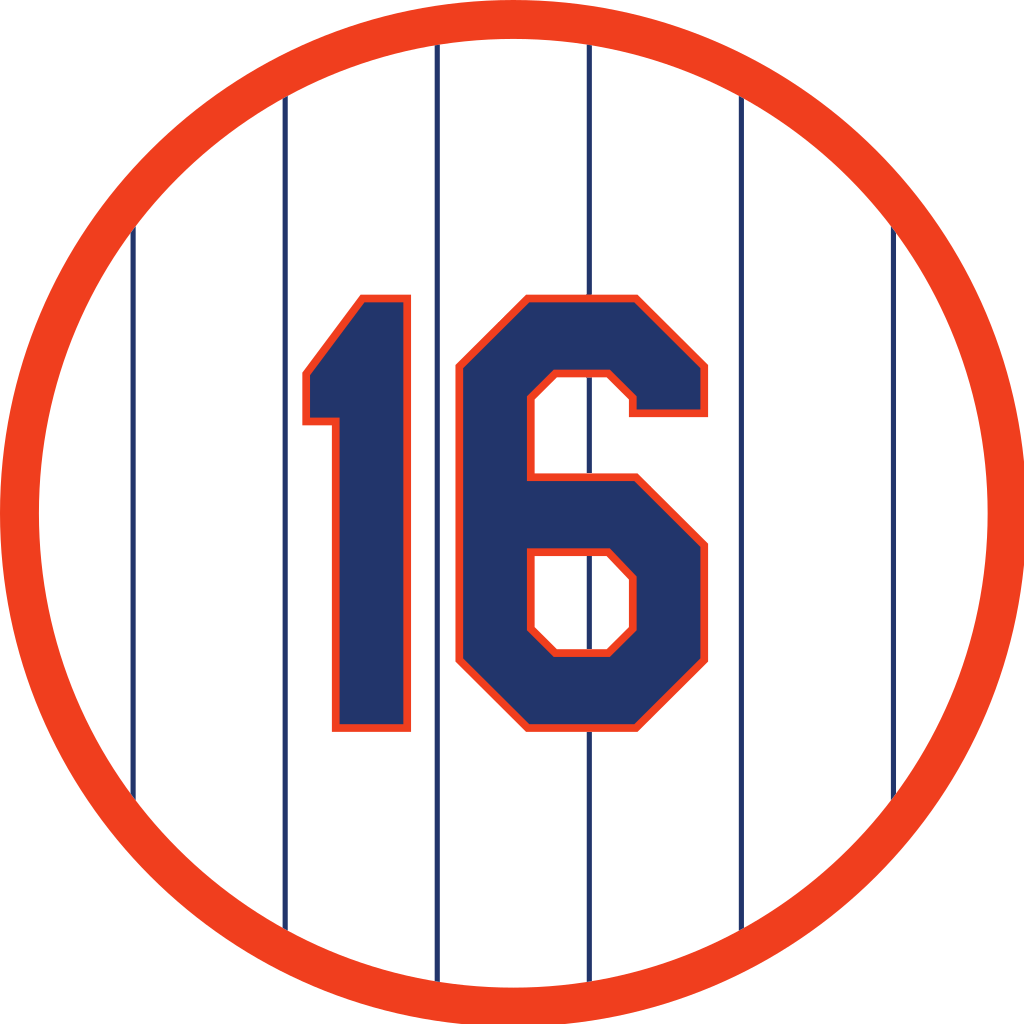
Dwight Gooden's number 16 was retired by the New York Mets in 2024.

Gooden retired in March 2001 after he was cut by the Yankees in spring training, ending his career with a record of 194–112. More than half of those wins came before age 25.

Gooden appeared on the 2006 Baseball Hall of Fame ballot. He was named on only 17 ballots, which was 3.3 percent of the 520 writers' ballots. Because he named on fewer than 5 percent of the ballots, he was removed from future writers ballots.

After retiring, Gooden took a job in the Yankees' front office. He acted as the go-between man during free agent contract negotiations between his nephew, Gary Sheffield, and the Yankees prior to the 2004 season. In July 2009, he was hired as a vice president of community relations for Atlantic League's Newark Bears. He left the post in November of the same year.

Gooden appeared at the Shea Stadium final celebration on September 28, 2008, the first time he had appeared at Shea Stadium since 2000. On April 13, 2009, he made an appearance at the newly opened Citi Field. Gooden spontaneously signed his name to a wall on the inside of the stadium. The Mets initially indicated that they would remove the signature, but soon decided instead to move the part of the wall with Gooden's writing to a different area of the stadium and acquire additional signatures from other popular ex-players. On August 1, 2010, he was officially inducted into the Mets Hall of Fame along with Darryl Strawberry, Frank Cashen, and Davey Johnson. That day, Gooden threw out the ceremonial first pitch to Gary Carter.

VH1 announced on June 11, 2011, that Gooden would be a patient on an upcoming season of the reality show Celebrity Rehab with Dr. Drew.

Gooden's number 16 was retired by the Mets on April 14, 2024.

== Legal troubles ==
In December 1986, Gooden was arrested in Tampa alongside nephew Gary Sheffield and former high school teammate Vance Lovelace after police stopped his Chevrolet Corvette. Gooden was charged with resisting arrest with violence, battery on a police officer, and disorderly conduct. He pleaded no contest in January 1987 and was sentenced to three years probation and 160 hours of community service.

On February 20, 2002, Gooden was arrested in Tampa and charged with driving while intoxicated, having an open container of alcohol in his vehicle, and driving with a suspended license. He was arrested again in January 2003 for driving with a suspended license. On March 12, 2005, Gooden was again arrested in Tampa for punching his girlfriend after she threw a telephone at his head. He was released two days later on a misdemeanor battery charge.

On August 23, 2005, Gooden drove away from a traffic stop in Tampa after being pulled over for driving erratically. He gave the officer his driver's license, twice refused to leave his car, and then drove away. The officer remarked in his report that Gooden's eyes were glassy and bloodshot, his speech was slurred, and a "strong" odor of alcohol was present on him. Three days after the traffic stop, Gooden turned himself in to police.

Gooden was again arrested in March 2006 for violating his probation, after he arrived high on cocaine at a scheduled meeting with his probation officer. He chose prison over extended probation, perhaps in the hope that incarceration would separate him from the temptations of his addiction. He entered prison on April 17, 2006. On May 31, Gooden said in an interview from prison, "I can't come back here ... I'd rather get shot than come back here ... If I don't get the message this time, I never will." Gooden was released from prison November 9, 2006, after nearly seven months' incarceration and was not placed on further probation.

On the morning of March 24, 2010, Gooden was arrested in Franklin Lakes, New Jersey, near his home, after leaving the scene of a traffic accident, having been located nearby and found to be under the influence of an undisclosed controlled substance. He was charged with DWI with a child passenger, leaving the scene of an accident, and other motor vehicle violations. Gooden was also charged with endangering the welfare of a child because a child was with him at the time of the accident. He later pleaded guilty to child endangerment, received five years' probation, and was ordered to undergo outpatient drug treatment.

Gooden was arrested for cocaine possession in Holmdel Township, New Jersey on June 7, 2019. Gooden had been stopped by police for driving too slowly and having illegally tinted windows when they discovered two baggies suspected of containing cocaine. Gooden was charged with possession of a controlled substance, possession of drug paraphernalia and driving under the influence. He pleaded guilty to one charge of possessing cocaine in August and was sentenced to a year probation in November 2020.

Another arrest for driving while intoxicated occurred on July 22, 2019, this time in Newark, New Jersey. Gooden had been due in court to answer for the cocaine possession arrest in June the day after his arrest in July.

== In popular culture ==
American rock band the Mountain Goats released a song entitled "Doc Gooden" on their 2019 album In League with Dragons. Songwriter John Darnielle's lyrics reference life as a baseball player.

American rapper Action Bronson mentioned Gooden in his 2015 song "Baby Blue."

American hiphop group Da Lench Mob referenced Gooden along with Babe Ruth in the 1992 song "You And Your Heroes."

The baseball video game MLB Power Pros uses Gooden's Dr. K nickname as the name for an ability that makes pitchers pitch well with two strikes.

In the seventh season premiere of Law & Order "Causa Mortis," aired in 1996, Adam Schiff compares a defense attorney whose career has rebounded after a series of personal and professional setbacks to Gooden, asking, "If Doc Gooden can rise from the dead, why not Abe Mercer?"

== See also ==
- List of Major League Baseball annual ERA leaders
- List of Major League Baseball annual strikeout leaders
- List of Major League Baseball annual wins leaders
- List of Major League Baseball career strikeout leaders
- List of Major League Baseball no-hitters
- Major League Baseball Triple Crown

Achievements
Preceded by Gilberto Reyes; 1983	Youngest Player in the National League; 1984	Succeeded by José González; 1985
Preceded by Steve Carlton	National League Pitching Triple Crown; 1985	Succeeded by Randy Johnson
Preceded by Al Leiter	No-hitter pitcher May 14, 1996	Succeeded by Hideo Nomo
