= Civil Rights Memorial =

American memorial in Montgomery, Alabama

Coordinates: 32.37626°N 86.30325°W

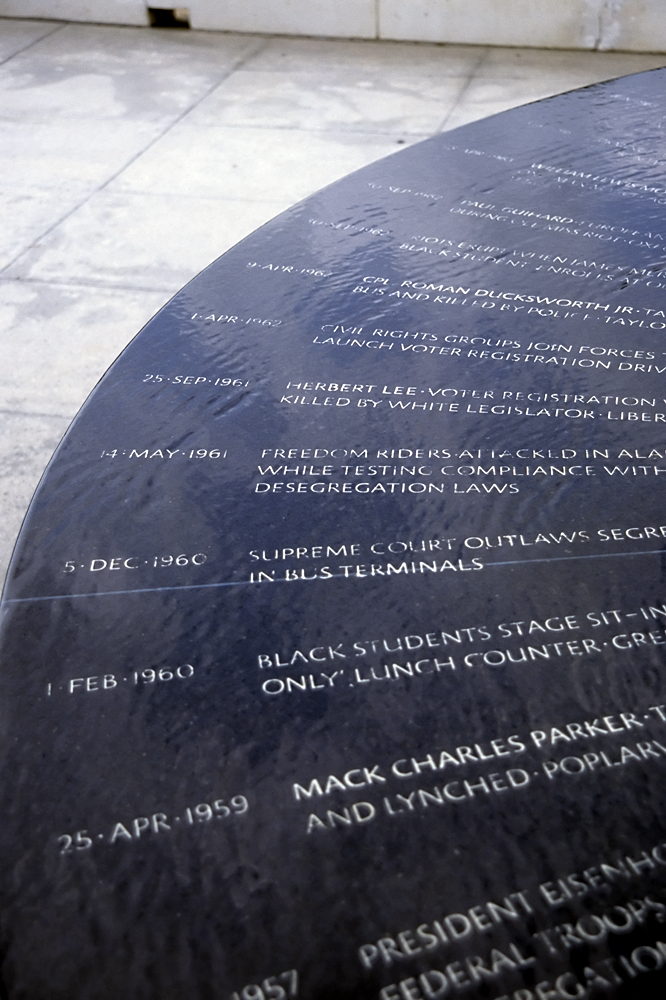
- Interactive map of Civil Rights Memorial
- Location: Montgomery, Alabama
- Designer: Maya Lin
- Material: Granite
- Opening date: 1989; 37 years ago
- Website: www.splcenter.org

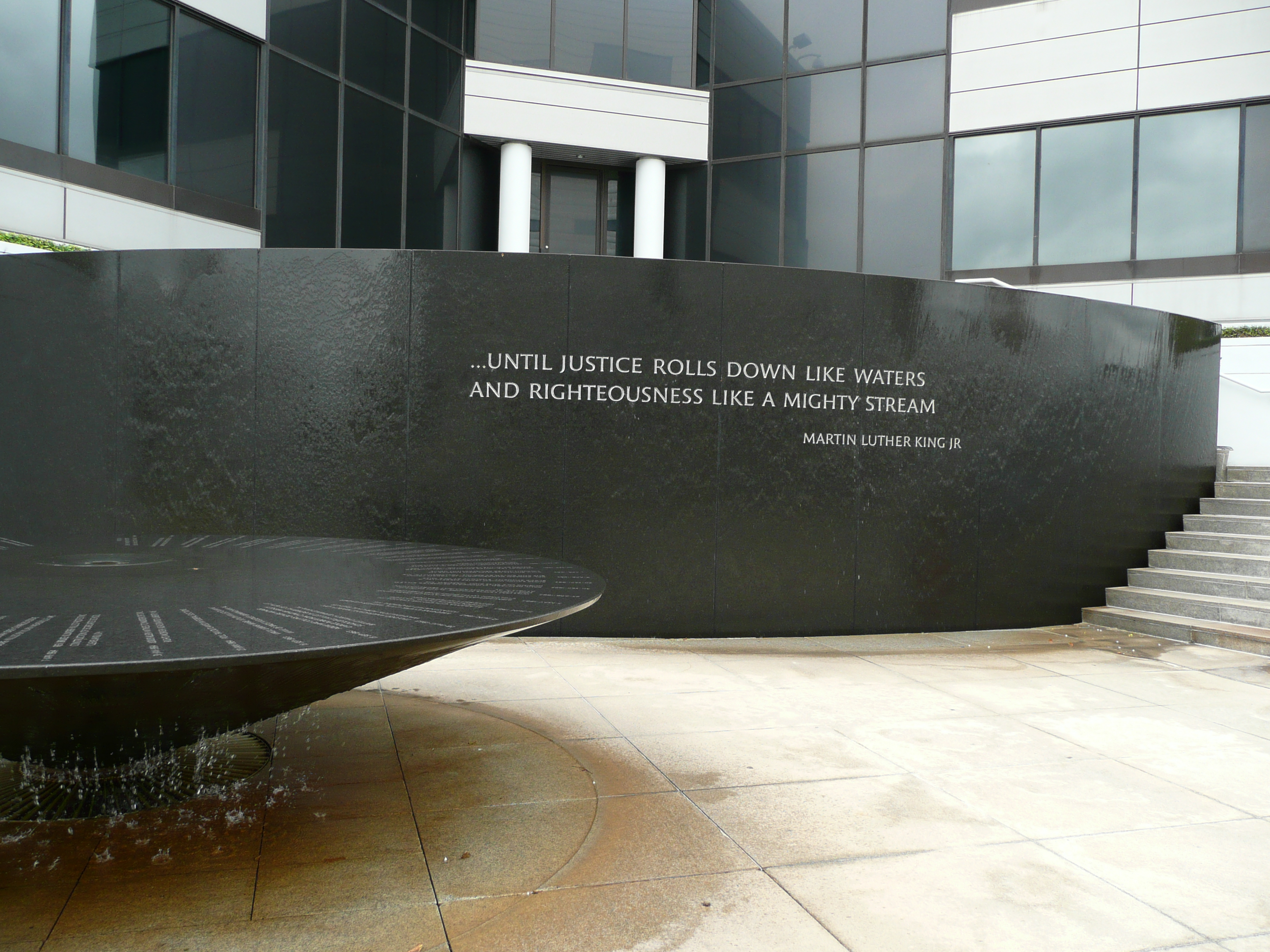
The Civil Rights Memorial

The Civil Rights Memorial is an American memorial in Montgomery, Alabama, created by Maya Lin. The names of 41 people are inscribed on the granite fountain as martyrs who were killed in the civil rights movement. The memorial is sponsored by the Southern Poverty Law Center.

== Design ==
The names included in the memorial belong to those who were killed between 1955 and 1968. The dates chosen represent a time when legalized segregation was prominent. In 1954 the U.S. Supreme Court ruled in Brown v. Board of Education that racial segregation in schools was unlawful and 1968 is the year of the assassination of Martin Luther King Jr. The monument was created by Maya Lin, who also created the Vietnam Veterans Memorial in Washington, D.C. The Civil Rights Memorial was dedicated in 1989.

The concept of Lin's design is based on the soothing and healing effect of water. It was inspired by a passage from King's 1963 "I Have a Dream" speech "...we will not be satisfied "until justice rolls down like waters and righteousness like a mighty stream..." The quotation in the passage, which is inscribed on the memorial, is a direct paraphrase of Amos 5:24, as translated in the American Standard Version of the Bible. The memorial is a fountain in the form of an asymmetric inverted stone cone. A film of water flows over the base of the cone, which contains the 41 names included. It is possible to touch the smooth film of water and to alter it temporarily, which quickly returns to smoothness. The memorial is designed in a timeline manner. It begins with Brown v. Board in 1954, and ends with Martin Luther King Jr.'s assassination in 1968.

== Tours and location ==
The memorial is in downtown Montgomery, at 400 Washington Avenue, in an open plaza in front of the Civil Rights Memorial Center, which was the offices of the Southern Poverty Law Center until it moved across the street into a new building in 2001. The memorial may be visited freely 24 hours a day, 7 days a week.

The Civil Rights Memorial Center offers guided group tours, lasting approximately one hour. Tours are available by appointment, Monday to Saturday.

The memorial is only a few blocks from other historic sites, including the Dexter Avenue King Memorial Baptist Church, the Alabama State Capitol, the Alabama Department of Archives and History, the corners where Claudette Colvin and Rosa Parks boarded buses in 1955 on which they would later refuse to give up their seats, and the Rosa Parks Library and Museum.

== Names included ==
=== "Civil Rights Martyrs" ===
The 41 names included in the Civil Rights Memorial are those of:

- Louis Allen
- Willie Brewster
- Benjamin Brown
- Johnnie Mae Chappell
- James Chaney
- Addie Mae Collins
- Vernon Dahmer
- Jonathan Daniels
- Henry Hezekiah Dee
- Roman Ducksworth Jr.
- Willie Edwards
- Medgar Evers
- Andrew Goodman
- Paul Guihard
- Samuel Hammond Jr.
- Jimmie Lee Jackson
- Wharlest Jackson
- Martin Luther King Jr.
- Bruce W. Klunder
- George W. Lee
- Herbert Lee
- Viola Liuzzo
- Denise McNair
- Delano Herman Middleton
- Charles Eddie Moore
- Oneal Moore
- William Lewis Moore
- Mack Charles Parker
- Lemuel Penn
- James Reeb
- John Earl Reese
- Carole Robertson
- Michael Schwerner
- Henry Ezekial Smith
- Lamar Smith
- Emmett Till
- Clarence Triggs
- Virgil Lamar Ware
- Cynthia Wesley
- Ben Chester White
- Sammy Younge Jr.

=== "The Forgotten" ===
"The Forgotten" are 74 people who are identified in a display at the Civil Rights Memorial Center. These names were not inscribed on the Memorial because there was insufficient information about their deaths at the time the Memorial was created. However, it is thought that these people were killed as a result of racially motivated violence between 1952 and 1968.

- Andrew Lee Anderson
- Frank Andrews
- Isadore Banks
- Larry Bolden
- James Brazier
- Thomas Brewer
- Hilliard Brooks
- Charles Brown
- Jessie Brown
- Carrie Brumfield
- Eli Brumfield
- Silas (Ernest) Caston
- Clarence Cloninger
- Willie Countryman
- Vincent Dahmon
- Woodrow Wilson Daniels
- Joseph Hill Dumas
- Pheld Evans
- J. E. Evanston
- Mattie Greene
- Jasper Greenwood
- Jimmie Lee Griffith
- A. C. Hall
- Rogers Hamilton
- Collie Hampton
- Alphonso Harris
- Izell Henry
- Arthur James Hill
- Ernest Hunter
- Luther Jackson
- Ernest Jells
- Joe Franklin Jeter
- Marshall Johnson
- John Lee
- Willie Henry Lee
- Richard Lillard
- George Love
- Robert McNair
- Maybelle Mahone
- Sylvester Maxwell
- Clinton Melton
- James Andrew Miller
- Booker T. Mixon
- Nehemiah Montgomery
- Frank Morris
- James Earl Motley
- Sam O'Quinn
- Hubert Orsby
- Larry Payne
- C. H. Pickett
- Albert Pitts
- David Pitts
- Ernest McPharland
- Jimmy Powell
- William Roy Prather
- Johnny Queen
- Donald Rasberry
- Fred Robinson
- Johnny Robinson
- Willie Joe Sanford
- Marshall Scott Jr.
- Jessie James Shelby
- W. G. Singleton
- Ed Smith
- Eddie James Stewart
- Isaiah Taylor
- Freddie Lee Thomas
- Saleam Triggs
- Hubert Varner
- Clifton Walker
- James Waymers
- John Wesley Wilder
- Rodell Williamson
- Archie Wooden

== See also ==
- Civil rights movement in popular culture
- History of fountains in the United States
- Title I of the Civil Rights Act of 1968
