= 1967 Tampa riots =

Race riot in Tampa, Florida, USA

- Part of Long, hot summer of 1967
- Date: June 11 – 15, 1967
- Location: Tampa, Florida
- Caused by: Martin Chambers being shot by Patrolman James Calvert and later dying; Racial inequality
- Methods: Protests, rioting, arson, looting
- Result: Investigations into the shooting of Martin Chambers done by authorities.; Program created by local businesspeople to reduce unemployment of black residents.; Unsuccessful attempts made to improve relations with black residents by law enforcement in the following years.; Contributed to the decline of Central Park.

Parties
Protestors, rioters	Florida; State agencies; Florida National Guard; Florida Highway Patrol; State Beverage Department; Local agencies; Hillsborough County Sheriff's Office; Tampa Police Department; Other law enforcement agencies; Pinellas County Sheriff's Office; St. Petersburg Police Department; Treasure Island Police Department

Lead figures
	Governor of Florida; Claude R. Kirk Jr.; Sheriff of Hillsborough County; Malcolm Beard; Mayor of Tampa; Nick Nuccio

Number
	472 – ~500 Florida National Guard soldiers; 235 Florida Highway Patrol troopers

Casualties
- Deaths: 1
- Arrested: 100+
- Damage: $2 million

The 1967 Tampa riots were a series of race riots during June 1967 in Tampa, Florida, as one of 159 such riots in the United States that summer.The Tampa riots began after a 19-year-old black man named Martin Chambers, who was one of three people suspected of robbing a camera supply warehouse on 421 East Ellasme Street, was fatally shot by a white officer of the Tampa Police Department, Patrolman James Calvert. The riots began on the night of June 11 and ended on June 15, in the neighborhood that was then known as Central Park.

== Background ==
=== June 11 ===
A hydroplane race took place on the day of June 11, where the Tampa Police Department's anti-riot unit, the Selective Enforcement Unit, was covering the event during the afternoon. TPD Chief James P. Mullins would be absent that day.

=== Central Park neighborhood ===
Central Park, previously known as "The Scrub", was Tampa's first African-American neighborhood located between downtown Tampa and Ybor City. The neighborhood grew with the arrival of Henry Plant's railroad in 1883 and the cigar industry two years later. Starting in the 1890s and lasting until the 1950s, it was the most significant black neighborhood in the city, with Central Avenue being called the "Harlem of the South".

=== Urban renewal ===
In the 1950s and 1960s, Tampa underwent significant urban development.

The federal Housing Act of 1949 and subsequent amendments allowed cities to pursue urban renewal projects. However, a 1952 Florida Supreme Court case ruled that cities could not use eminent domain to sell the land to private companies to redevelop. Though, with this case, cities in Florida could not participate in the Act, the legislature passed laws allowing Tampa and Tallahassee to undertake urban renewal projects. Urban renewal in the Central Avenue neighborhood was seen as a way to increase tax revenue.

Renewal projects forced some residents to leave their homes. The circumstances were exacerbated by insufficient low-income housing. Even before displacement, public housing was often filled up and private housing did not have the same quality or prices as public housing. As part of a slum-clearance project, two public housing projects would be built in parts of its area during 1954: Robles Park Village and Central Park Village. During May 1958, the Urban Renewal Agency (URA) in Tampa's municipal government was created by Mayor Nick Nuccio.

Ybor City saw the practices of blockbusting and redlining in it. African-American residents in Tampa often had difficulty getting loans from insurance and mortgage companies. Many black residents' views were not factored in during urban renewal projects, especially as URA had no black members on its board.

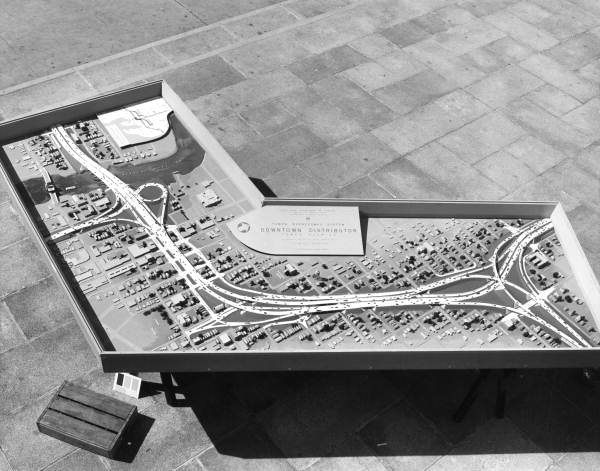
A model of Interstate 4 in Tampa.

For the construction of Interstate 4 (finished in 1963), an estimated 2,544 homes were razed and a sizable amount of neighborhood would be demolished for it. During the freeway construction that was done in Tampa, the URA estimated that several hundred black families would be displaced with freeway construction between 1962 and 1963 along with roughly 400 others being relocated by code enforcement related reasons.

=== Civil Rights Movement ===
During the Civil Rights Movement in Tampa, there was little violence in the city. Starting in February 1960, a series of sit-ins at several stores in the downtown area took place, leading to 18 stores in Downtown Tampa being integrated in September. During the sit-ins, the only time that the police intervened was when they had to remove two white people from a Walgreens who were being abusive to protesters. Martin Luther King Jr. visited Tampa on November 19, 1961, and gave a speech at Fort Homer Hesterly Armory to a crowd of 4,200 people. A false bomb threat led to King and the attendees being evacuated and the speech was delayed by 30 minutes.

By 1967, Tampa was described as having little visible legal segregation in it. The city practiced the "Tampa Technique" of desegregating in a slow and nonconfrontational manner. However, there was significant economical segregation. Many black residents in the city were denied jobs and didn't have access to civil service tests. Black residents were also dissatisfied with the rate at which low-cost housing was being built, the poor quality of policing, a shortage of recreational facilities, and being exploited by white business owners in black neighborhoods.

== Initial incident ==
=== Chase ===
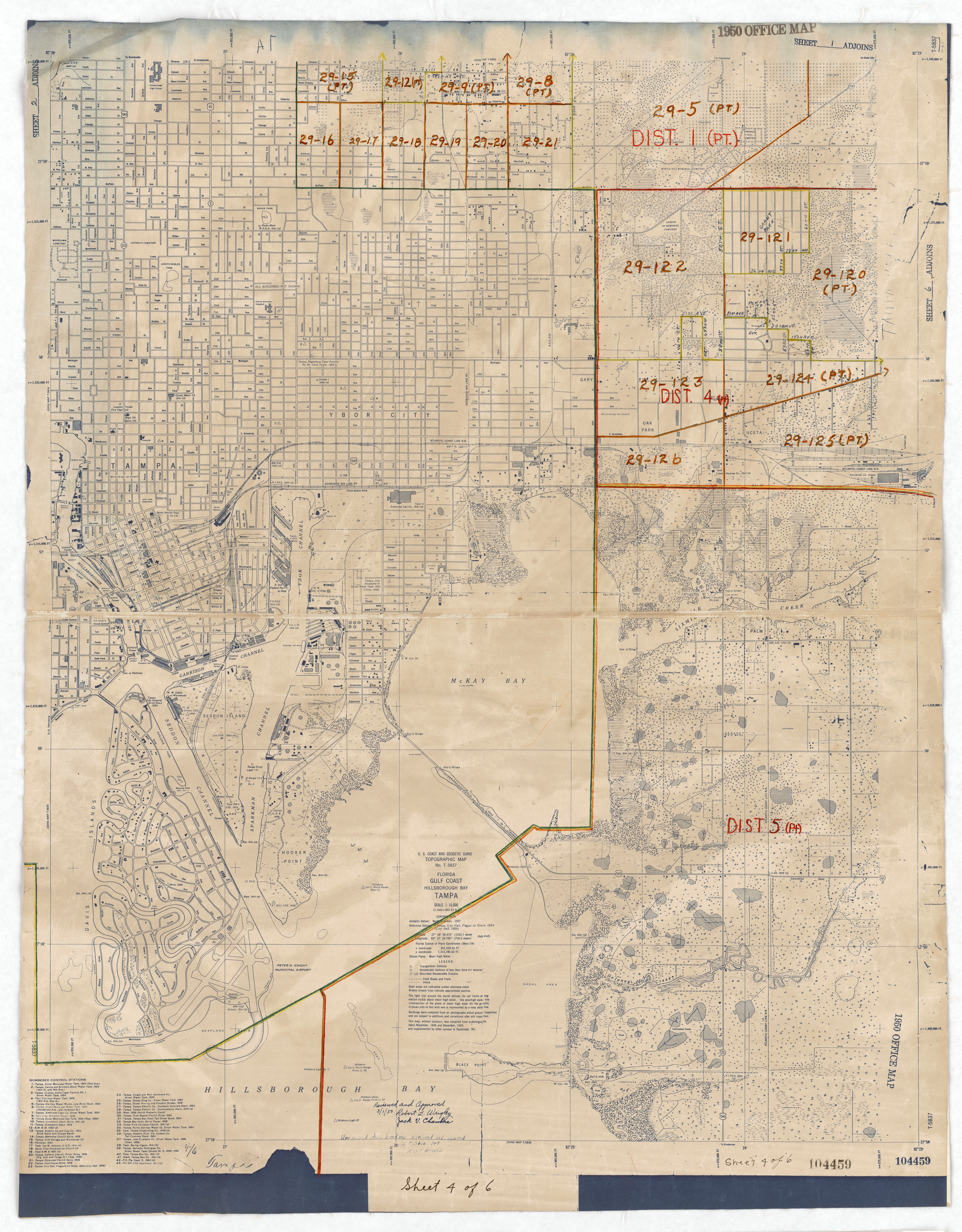
A 1950 United States Census enumeration district map of Tampa. Most of the streets that are mentioned on the page can be seen on this map.

On June 11, 1967, three black burglars—Martin Chambers (19 years old), John Dawson, and Calvin Moore (15)—broke into Tampa's Photo Supply Warehouse located at 421 East Ellasme Street at 5:30 pm, stealing photographic and film equipment worth over $100. Chambers is known to have had a criminal record in the past.

Tampa Police Department (TPD) Patrolman R.L. Cloud and G.L. Hackney were both on patrol in their police cars on Nebraska Avenue at the time. At approximately 6:18 pm, the two officers observed the three men near an alley that connected to Nebraska Avenue located between Zack and Twiggs Street, believing them to be suspects in robbing the camera supply warehouse. Once spotted on Nebraska Avenue, they broadcast over the police radio that the men were the likely suspects in the burglary and gave descriptions of them. Cloud and Hackney followed the suspects until they noticed the two officers. All 3 suspects fled from the police once being spotted. Monroe attempted to escape but would end up being arrested.

Chambers, who was unarmed, ran through the surrounding neighborhood while trying to escape from the police. With Chambers having lost the two officers, Cloud and Hackney sent a message over the radio asking for assistance. J.L. Calvert, a white police officer who was alone in his police cruiser at the time of the broadcast, would join in and chase Chambers. After all three suspects had split up, Chambers would encounter Edward Thomas at one point. Thomas later on took the blame for the robbery. Monroe said that he himself, Thomas and Chambers were the ones that had robbed the store and had done it together.

When black residents of the Central Park Village housing project became aware of the chase, they began to participate and some even tried to help officers in locating Chambers. R.C. Oates—one of seventeen black police officers among the total 511 officers in the Tampa Police Department—called for Chambers to surrender, but was ignored. Calvert yelled at Chambers to stop but was also ignored. Chambers was chased by Calvert until he reached the rear side of a home in an unknown location. The rear side was described as facing a southerly direction while the front faced the north. The chase went into an alley that was 25 feet (7.6 m) long and 2 feet (0.61 m) wide bounded by a chain-link fence and the home itself with Chambers entering from the southeast.

=== Shooting and immediate aftermath ===
Still in the alley, near the intersection of Cass Street and Nebraska Avenue, Calvert fired his .38 revolver at Chambers' back once and the bullet passed completely through his body. As Chambers was a few feet away from exiting, Calvert claimed that if Chambers had left the alley, he would have lost him.

Witnesses, on the other hand, said that Chambers had stopped and that he was attempting to surrender. However, when the witnesses were brought to the crime scene, they said they were at the westerly side of the house, a viewpoint that the police deemed would be impossible to view what happened in those moments. Calvert also claimed that he was attempting to shoot directly above Chambers' back but that he had missed. At the time of the shooting, Patrolman Calvert was described as "not having any special qualifications in marksmanship."

A crowd gathered around where Chambers had been shot and were angered about what happened to him. An ambulance was sent for Chambers but ended up getting lost along the way. As such, Oates put Chambers into his car and drove him to the hospital. Shortly after putting him in his car, Chambers died. Close to the time of Chambers being put into the car, a rainstorm occurred and the crowd dispersed. The rainstorm itself is said to have lasted two hours, but it is unknown when it ended.

== Events ==
=== June 11 ===
At 7:30 pm, a report was received by the TPD saying that 500 people were gathering in an unspecified location. A police car was sent there but did not find anyone. In the Central Park Village housing complex, hundreds of people left the apartments as soon as the rain stopped. They discussed the shooting and incidents of prejudice that they had faced. At some point, in an attempt to persuade the crowd into dispersing, Officer Oates went to the area and make an announcement that an investigation would be made into Chambers' shooting.

Appearing to make progress in calming down the crowd, Oates' words were outweighed when a woman came running down a street screaming about her brother who was killed by the police. It is said that this caused the immediate crowd to become galvanized. The crowd began stoning in general, with police cars in the area being hit by rocks. The police tried to replicate what they had done in a similar incident in the past by withdrawing all police units which resulted in the crowd dispersing. However, this time it did not work and resulted in the opposite effect. In commercial areas nearby, the patrons of bars and nightclubs joined in with the initial crowd. A group of rioters moved down Central Avenue where the first stores were hit and the first fire was set.

During the early period of the riots, there was a lack of intelligence from the police resulting in their slow reaction time. Officers began to arrive in the area between 11:00 and 11:50 pm. After 11 pm, a request for deputies from Hillsborough County Sheriff Malcolm Beard was made. The recall order that was made earlier that day was rescinded by 11:30 pm. By 11:50, there was enough law enforcement officers to create an "assault line" to move into the area where they thought the civil disorder was happening. While assembling at Cass Street, they encountered sniper fire. As a result, Sherriff's Department deputies and police officers were placed on the roof of the Pyramid Hotel to give cover. The group of officers and deputies moved north along Central Avenue going from Cass Street to Harrison Street. By the time the police started their march to try and penetrate the area, there were falling power lines in the area, with electrical sparks flying in the air near the line of officer's marching on the street. Using a sound car, the police announced that anyone caught with weapons would be shot. After the announcement, the firing ceased.

Officers crossed an alley on Harrison Street from the northwest corner of Harrison Street and Central Avenue. After a building collapsed, flames shot out from it, blocking Central Avenue. Those who were firing at the police likely obtained their weapons after looting a gun store. Police using dogs moved in to seek them out.

=== June 12 ===
At 12:45 am, law enforcement forces began an attempt to create a perimeter around the area where civil unrest had been encountered at so far. The Sheriff's Department was responsible for all entrances to the area from the eastern side of Orange Street going from Scott to Cass Street. While doing these maneuvers, Sgt. Donald Clark Williams, a deputy from the Sheriff's Department who was leading a squad, died of a heart attack. Williams, who had a previous medical history relating to the heart attack, was 52 years old and had been with the Sheriff's Departments for 6 years at the time of his death.

While the TPD was responsible for all entrances on Central Avenue spanning from Scott to Harrison Street, the perimeter later ended up being extended and prohibited traffic going in and out of the area. The new perimeter was bounded by Cass Street towards the south, Nebraska Avenue in the east, Henderson Avenue in the north and Orange Street in the west.

For the following 12 hours, it was tense in the area.

By 1 am, firefighters began extinguishing the fires that had been set to 3 buildings and had spread to several nearby buildings by this point. Most fires were extinguished by 4 am. Deputy Fire Chief Charles Wells claimed that over 100 firefighters responded that night and none were injured.

At 2 am, Sheriff Beard called Governor Claude Kirk who was in West Palm Beach at the time. Kirk flew into the city for a two-hour-long conference with Mayor Nick Nuccio and other city officials, and left by dawn. During the early daytime hours, Tampa's Sanitation Department sent 50 workers to clean up the area that was destroyed. The process took 3 hours in total, but it is unclear when it started. At 7 am, all officers and deputies were placed on a 12-hour day with no days off. Sheriff deputies that were doing the perimeter control were relieved by the TPD officers at 9:34 am.

Between 10 am and noon, the TPD contacted all stores that sold guns and ammunition requesting them to stop selling items to customers; all stores were cooperative. Pawn shops were also contacted with the same request. All ammunition wholesalers were granted 24-hour, around-the-clock protection by the police. By that afternoon, the officers of both policing forces were tired and none were available in reserves. As result, Beard requested for a National Guard unit to be available at 1 pm. At close to the same time, gunfire was heard in the area of Central Park Village and a news helicopter flying over the area was shot at. The units that Beard had requested were received between 3:30 pm and 4:30 pm.

Governor Kirk spoke with local residents at a school in the Central Park Village area during the late afternoon. During the meeting at the school the atmosphere was described as being tense and speakers regardless of race were booed and hissed at. Nothing came out of the meeting, but Kirk thought it let the residents to take off steam.

During the evening, National Guard troops began to replace the local policing forces in maintaining the perimeter around Central Park. Two groups of 70 local law enforcement officers each did patrols that night. The first group did a patrol heading North on Central Avenue until Scott Street, where they headed on Scott, towards Nebraska Avenue, before going back to the command post that was located at the intersection of Cass Street and Central Avenue. The second group started its patrol going west on India Street until Nebraska Avenue. Once on Nebraska Avenue, they headed to Governor Street, where officers headed south to Harrison Street and turned westwards on it until reaching Central Avenue and returning to the same command post as the first group. Forty law enforcement officers were sent to Main Street in West Tampa between Albany and Armenia Avenues. Antipoverty workers went from door-to-door urging that people stay off the streets during that night as well.

At 11 pm, the St. Petersburg Police Department along with the Treasure Island and Polk County Sheriff's Offices offered assistance to help the police forces with the riots. Pinellas County's reinforcements consisted of a riot squad with 20 members and 2 paddy wagons. The riot squad had been used several days earlier to quell a riot that happened in Clearwater.

It is unclear what the precise number of National Guards troops there were in the city. A 1967 congressional report about the usage of military troops during civil unrest that mentioned the riots said that 475 troops were deployed. A report done by the State Adjunct General for 1967 and 1968 said that 472 troops in total were deployed, which included 83 officers. Moreover, a publication from the US Army Office of Military History from 1971 says that approximately 500 were deployed and stated that the precise number of troops that were activated was not recorded.

=== June 13 ===
During the early morning hours of June 13, the city was described as being rather quiet overall. Law enforcement forces received several reports they deemed to be false during the early morning hours. The Florida State Beverage Department offered officers to assist in Tampa at 1:10 am. The only significant piece of information that the police received and deemed to be true was when they encountered a non-white male using a CB radio to communicate with others at 1:15 am. However, the police were not sure as to whether it was directly relating to the riots.

At 10:55 am, the police believed a "Possible racial outbreak" had happened at Lopez Feed Co., located at 2300 East 7th Avenue, that was sparked by an African-American male burglary suspect being shot in the wrist by the owner, Manuel Lopez. It is unknown what entailed in this "Possible racial outbreak" that Jack de La Llana had described in his testimony to US Congress.

At 12:55 pm, Manuel Fenandez, a member of the city council, asked the police to standby at A. A. Gonzales Clinic between 10:30 and 11:05 pm. Fernandez's reasoning was that nurses needed to change shifts and, according to him they were molested and stoned the previous night. A group of about 20 black people were reported to have been at the Mayor's Office at 4:30 pm demanding that they be able to see the mayor. They were told that the mayor was at the Meachum School and could be seen there. The group would not leave and did not want to talk with anyone else. Police forces did not attempt to remove them as they thought the mayor should see them. Mayor Nuccio left the Meachum School at 5:02 pm and, before he left for the College Hill School, went back to his office to speak with the group that had gathered there. Nuccio arrived at 5:53 pm and spoke with the black groups there in a meeting. The group wanted the police to be "removed from area" and wanted to do policing of it instead, which the mayor and sheriff agreed to. Calls for African Americans wanting to do the policing themselves led to the creation of a youth patrol referred to as the "White Hats". Over the next 24 hours, a total of 126 people joined the patrol.

During that day, the perimeter around Central Park Village was maintained at all times of the day by police officers. Throughout the day, the police received many false reports with activities reported to them being dramatized. Mayor Nuccio that day met with local residents, who suggested that Coash Jim Williams in Tallahassee would be most effective in calming down the rioters. A complaint often presented to him was that residents disliked the National Guard's presence in the city, particularly in predominantly black sections of it.

=== June 14 and conclusion ===
On June 14 at 12:18 am, a car was stopped by the TPD on Madison Street with 12 non-white males in it. Two Molotov cocktails were found and all 12 were arrested. One minute later, two white males carrying shotguns at Beach Street and Howard Avenue in West Tampa were reported to the police. The TPD went to the scene and held them in custody. The TPD's second radio frequency went offline at about 4 am, but was repaired and went back online by 8 am. Having 50,000 ammunition rounds and 250 guns, the Less Gun and Archery Shop located on Fairbanks and Nebraska Avenue told the TPD that they needed someplace to store them. It was accepted and the equipment was placed in the Police Department's property room.

A meeting was held that afternoon in the "Citizens building". People in attendance included Chief Mullins, Sheriff Beard, Mayor Nuccio, NAACP members, and other local law enforcement officers. Black people who were attending the meeting requested that Patrolman Calvert be fired by the municipal government. The mayor and the police chief, however, did not accept this, which was meant with general hostility by meeting attendees. (The reason as to why the mayor and police chief did not want to fire Patrolman Calvert is unknown.) Also during that afternoon, the Sheriff announced that he had the authorization by Governor Kirk to create a curfew during the night hours, arresting anyone who was found on the streets at night.

At 10:03 pm, "Armed persons" were reported on Central Avenue at the Club Sudan. At the same time, another report was received by the police that there was a large crowd at Central Avenue and Constant Street. A disturbance took place with a fight between two black females in a bar. One person was cut and needed an ambulance which was sent. A strike force, composed of Sheriff's Department deputies and TPD officers, was organized, in response. They were sent to the Central Avenue and waited 150 feet (46 m) away from the crowd to observe them and intervene if necessary. They returned to the Sheriff's office at 10:15 pm and waited there for orders.

A conference was held at the Sheriff's Office at 10 am, and at this time the National Guard was demobilized and put on alert. A command room that had been established in the Sheriff's Office was closed at 11:50 am. For the rest of the week, officers worked 12-hour long shifts.

All troops were withdrawn from the city, excluding liaison personnel, leaving on June 18. The Police Department and Sheriff's Department went back to normal operations on June 19.

== Response ==
Apart from purely responding from the violence caused by the unrest, law enforcement forces provided security to certain locations and people. Jack De La Llana went into detail about the security that was provided during his testimony to US Congress. Auxiliary forces were deployed to provide perimeter security for the Tampa Police Department and Hillsborough County Sheriff's Office headquarters. Governor Claude Kirk was assigned a deputy when he was in the Tampa area. Two officers were assigned to guard Paul Antinori's house while one officer would accompany Mayor Nick Nuccio.

A youth patrol force later referred to as the "White Hats" was created in response to the grievances that many African Americans had towards law enforcement during the riots. Originally they were identified by the usage of phosphorescent arm bands and later by their usage of white hats. Hillsborough County's Sheriff department spent some of its money at an army surplus store to buy helmets and then paint them white; 125 helmets with liners ended up being purchased. Colonel Bullard from the National Guard was approached about this but said they did not have a sufficient amount available. Eventually, the White Hats wound up getting disbanded after several of its members were indicted for felony charges not related to the riots.

== Aftermath ==
The riots ended up lasting several days and their ending was credited to Governor Claude R. Kirk Jr. who ordered in a variety of reinforcements to assist on June 14. By the end of the rioting, over 100 people were arrested and $2 million in damage was to be dealt.

Martin Chambers' funeral was held on June 24 at 3:30 pm. It was monitored by the Sheriff's Department that flew a plane over the funeral site and areas they deemed to be critical. No disturbances in the city took place during his funeral despite the mobilization of police forces. On June 23, Beard held a conference at the Sheriff's Office where officials from both the Tampa Police Department and the Hillsborough County's Sheriff Department in preparation for Chambers funeral. TPD deployed 4 squads, having 35 officers in total, while the Sheriff's Department put 25 deputies on standby.

=== Results/legacy ===
Statistics about Tampa were included in the Kerner Commission. A two day long investigation was done by the Hillsborough County District Attorney office declaring that the shooting of Chambers was justified. The state attorney for Hillsborough County, Paul Antinori said that his office would investigate it. Antinori reached a similar conclusion saying that the use of deadly force was justified. He said the shooting was justified because he was a known felon trying to escape being arrested. Black youths who said they were witnesses towards the shooting in hearings held by Antinori said Chambers stopped, put his hands up and turn towards Patrolman Calvert when he was shot him. Martin's mother, Janie Bell Chambers continued to try to seek justice for him until her death in 1996. She often held protests at her son's grave along with vigils there. Janie tried to get the city to investigate her son's death in 1990, which led to the Florida Department of Law Enforcement finding that the shooting was justifiable. In 2007, Martin Chambers' two siblings: Jeffery Collins-King Chambers and Sabrina King along with Marzuq Al-Hakim who were advocating for them went before the Tampa City Council to ask if they could send Martin's case to the US Department of Justice. 40 years later, Tampa's municipal government would not admit it did anything wrong involving him. Also during 2007, an advisory committee for the mayor moved to rename a room in the Kid Mason Recreation Center that was located on Orange Street in honor of him.

On July 12, local business owners created a program to give jobs to many of the city's African-American residents as a way to counteract the racial tensions in the city by reducing unemployment. Sergeant J.S. de la Llana of the TPD's Criminal Intelligence Unit testified to the US Senate on August 4 about the riots.

The county sheriff department and municipal police force attempted to improve community relationships. Despite this, the relationships between black residents and the police would not improve which led to a two-day long open hearing would be held by the Florida State Advisory Committee to the US Commission on Civil Rights in May 1971 to investigate whether relationships between Tampa's black community and local law enforcement were worsening and how to improve them.

==== 1972 report ====
A report was produced by the Florida Advisory Committee in December 1972 concluding that black residents in the city did have strained relations with the police. Law enforcement tried to increase the amount of black law enforcement officers but had little success due to a few reasons: poor relations with them, low pay, lack of promotions, a minority recruitment program not existing and biased evaluation/testing procedures that were done. At the end of the report, there were several recommendations made falling into three general categories. For the mayor and city council it would endorse: passing a city ordinance endorsing non-discrimination and affirmative action in the city government, give more power to the Tampa Commission on Community Relations, creating the position of ombudsman to be held by someone who was liked by the community. While for the police and sheriff's department it would propose: both agencies expand minority recruitment programs, review qualifications of officers, fire those who were discriminatory towards nonwhites, applying affirmative action, appointing minority group members to high level policy positions, letting the police meet with citizens to discuss issues, making disciplinary actions done to law enforcement officers public information, publicizing their existing police complaint system and making an external way to handle complaints by the police, making steps to determine that actions are not prejudiced, strictly enforcing rules against using racial slurs along with making those rules well-known, publicize regulations related to weapons and also let the general public know the police go through human relations training. For other groups it would recommend several things: that the Florida Civil Service's role in the employment of law enforcement officers from minority groups be considered, improving the judicial system for minorities and it's functioning for them and that local leaders should prioritize trying to make the city more tolerant.

==== Continued urban renewal ====
Sometime during 1972, the URA was dissolved. The riots along with other urban renewal orientated projects contributed to the neighborhood's downfall. The final business on Central Avenue was closed down in 1974 and its building was demolished that year. Perry Harvey Sr. Park was developed in 1979 at the request of local youths. It was named after Perry Harvey Sr. a long time president of International Longshoremen's Association local chapter 1402 and an advocate for civil rights. Central Park Village was demolished to make way for another urban renewal project named the Encore which opened on December 18, 2012 and contains a mix of residential and commercial spaces.

== See also ==
- Long, hot summer of 1967
- 1987 Tampa riots
