= Vance Lovelace =

American baseball player (born 1963)

- Pitcher
- Born: August 9, 1963 (age 62); Tampa, Florida, U.S.
- Batted: Left Threw: Left

MLB debut
- September 10, 1988, for the California Angels

Last MLB appearance
- September 22, 1990, for the Seattle Mariners

MLB statistics
- Win–loss record: 0–0
- Earned run average: 5.79
- Strikeouts: 2

CPBL statistics
- Win–loss record: 1–4
- Earned run average: 8.31
- Strikeouts: 27
- Stats at Baseball Reference

Teams
- California Angels (1988–1989); Seattle Mariners (1990); Brother Elephants (1993, 1998)

Vance Odell Lovelace (born August 9, 1963) is an American former Major League Baseball pitcher from 1988 to 1990 for the California Angels and Seattle Mariners. Lovelace was a southpaw power pitcher from Tampa's Hillsborough High School, the same school where Dwight Gooden and Gary Sheffield played.

== Career ==
Lovelace appeared in nine games during his career, all in relief, and finished with a 0–0 career record, and a 5.79 ERA over just 4.2 total innings pitched from 1988 to 1990. Lovelace spent 1981 to 1987, and 1991 to 1994 in Minor League Baseball for the Chicago Cubs, Los Angeles Dodgers, California Angels, Seattle Mariners, Detroit Tigers, Atlanta Braves, and Texas Rangers. organizations, including a brief stint in the Chinese Professional Baseball League for the Brother Elephants in 1993. Lovelace also appeared for the Brother Elephants during the 1998 season. In 1997 and 1998, Lovelace played in the Northeast League for the Catskill Cougars and New Jersey Jackals.

He joined the Dodgers as vice-president of Player Personnel in 2009 and his position was changed to Special Advisor to the President in 2014, which he held through 2016.
