= Roman Ducksworth Jr. =

African-American military police officer shot and killed in Taylorsville, Mississippi

- Born: May 26, 1934
- Died: April 9, 1962 (aged 27); Taylorsville, Mississippi
- Cause of death: Gunshot wounds
- Occupation: Military police officer
- Spouse: Melva Ducksworth

Corporal Roman Ducksworth Jr. (May 26, 1934 – April 9, 1962) was a notable figure in American civil rights history, whose story reflects the struggle for racial equality during the violent era of the 1960s. He was shot and killed in a hate crime by Taylorsville, Mississippi police as he was heading to the hospital expecting his sixth child. His death is one of the cases that exemplify the systemic racial violence and injustice prevalent in the United States, particularly in the South, during this period.

== Personal life ==
Ducksworth was a military police officer stationed in Maryland, a few months short of finishing ten years service in the army. He was married and had six children, the last born right after his death.

== Death and after ==
Ducksworth was granted emergency leave by the Army after learning that his wife was having difficulties with the birth of their youngest daughter.

On April 9, 1962, Ducksworth was traveling to a hospital to visit his sick wife and newborn child. He was sleeping on the bus when a police officer escorted him off due to his race and possibly mistaking him as a freedom rider. A small tussle broke out, the officer drew his gun, and fired into Ducksworth's chest. Ducksworth's sister-in-law and her son, Odell Ducksworth, were present as he was pronounced dead on the scene.

Initial court proceedings attempted to label Roman as drunk, and the murder as self-defense. The murder was ruled a 'justifiable homicide', and no further justice has been taken upon the case ever since. As a result of the killing, Odell Ducksworth lost his job at a laundromat a few days later. Following that a cross was seen burning across his street and Odell's family was forced to move.

Upon his death Ducksworth received full military honors and a 16-gun salute. Roughly two thousand towns members attended his funeral. In 1989, the Southern Poverty Law Center commemorated Roman Ducksworth as a civil rights martyr on a memorial designed by Maya Lin.
