= 1987 Tampa riots =

Race riots in Tampa, Florida, United States

- Location: Tampa, Florida
- Caused by: Killing of Black Americans by police; Racial inequalities

Parties
Rioters	Tampa Police Department	Ku Klux Klan (February 18–21)

The 1987 Tampa riots were two riots in Tampa, Florida, that occurred in February and April 1987 that started after two African Americans died in encounters with the police. The years 1986 and 1987 would be a time of racial tension in Tampa as well.

It would be similar to nearly 20 years earlier when Tampa was the site of rioting for several days after a 19-year-old African American man named Martin Chambers was shot and killed by a white police officer of the Tampa Police Department, James Calvert.

== Background ==
During a period spanning from November 1986 to April 1987, four African American males were killed during encounters involving white officers of the Tampa Police Department. At the time, 25% of African Americans who lived in Tampa resided in public housing projects. In the census tracts for the College Hill and Ponce de Leon housing projects, the population increased 17% between 1970 and 1985, which was at twice the rate of other black neighborhoods in the city. In July 1986, the unemployment rate was reported as being 10.4% for black people in Hillsborough County while the white unemployment rate was 5.2%.

Blacks who were middle class would move to different neighborhoods apart from College Hill and Ponce de Leon while white families who lived in the area prior to arrival of blacks in general had moved to the suburbs.

== February 18–21, 1987 ==
=== Incident ===
The riot started after a 23-year-old African American man named Melvin Eugene Hair who had paranoid schizophrenia got into a fight with his family and died after being restrained by the police when they intervened. The fight started after Hair started reading cards from other players in a card game. His mother told him to stop and then attempted to burn someone with a cigarette. A fight broke out and a guest ended up calling the police to get him to a mental health center. The guest said on the phone that Hair had a knife to get a quicker response, despite the fact that he did not have one. Officers who responded got into a fight while trying to restrain him. Eventually, one of the responding officers, David D’Agresta put Hair into a carotid artery restraint that he had learned at the police academy. Later on, attempts were made to revive him but were unsuccessful.

=== Course of events ===
The teenagers who had gathered at the street corner grew angry because of Hair's death and a recent news story airing on local TV stations about the city attorney blaming Dwight Gooden for starting a fight with white Tampa police officers. A crowd started to gather and later became a violent mob that set fire to a dumpster along with rock and bottle throwing starting. The resulting riot lasted for three days.

During the evening of February 19, a group of about 200 people participated in rioting, which was first reported as beginning at 8 PM. Approximately 75 police officers wearing riot gear cordoned off the area and one officer was injured after being hit by a brick. The crowd started to shrink at 11:30 PM according to Mayor Sandy Freeman who visited the scene at 11 PM. On the same day, copies about a report pertaining to Gooden's arrest were released by the city attorney. The report stated that officers had unsuccessfully tried to put Gooden into a chokehold when he and four others fought them.

A police command center was set up at the intersections of East Buffalo Avenue and 18th Street. A local grocery store was looted, along with homes occupied by white residents and a McDonald's in the area was hit by rocks and broken into. With violence escalating, the Ku Klux Klan got involved.

== Interim ==
Tampa held a mayoral election on March 4, 1987, with incumbent mayor Sandy Freeman winning the 5 way nonpartisan race, becoming the first elected female mayor in the city's history. Freeman had served as mayor since July 1986, when Bob Martinez resigned his position to run for governor. Freedman would end up winning all of the precincts in the city with the exception of one. She would get 379 votes in the precinct covering College Hill compared to the combined total of 21 for her opponents despite her opponents attacking her about the riot that happened in College Hill.

Anthony Perkins, who was African American, was shot and killed by a white police officer named Scott Johnson during a chase on March 23. The chase started in a pizzeria's parking lot where he allegedly stole a woman's purse. Perkins had a pistol with him at the sight of the robbery and had fired his weapon after the robbery according to witnesses. "Officials" would say Perkins had the gun at the restaurant but didn't fire it and had dropped it before getting shot on Interstate 275.

== April 6–7, 1987 ==
Another riot would start on April 6, after an African American man, Otis Bernard Miller, died after an encounter with the police on April 5. The police were responding to a report of a suspicious person and ended up encountering Miller who had a shopping cart containing aluminum cans. He was described as behaving in a hostile manner towards two officers, Roxanne Wollam and Michael D. Noyes who responded to the case as Miller spat on Wollam's shoes two or three times. A fight started as both officers tried to handcuff him, and Miller died a few hours later. "A preliminary medical report" was not able to identify the exact cause of Miller's death but did rule out a chokehold or head injury. Miller had a chronic heart valve disorder. Miller was revived but died in a hospital on April 6, while in surgery to try to find the source of his "chest bleeding".

This riot was much smaller than the one sparked by Hair's death. 11 blocks were cordoned off with the disturbance lasting for a total of 5 hours along with 5 arrests being made.

== Results/Legacy ==
The results and legacy of the riots were multifaceted.

The Federal Bureau of Investigation (FBI) investigated the police department for their practices several times and the mayor tried to increase the number of black officers on the police force. Tampa's police chief Donald Newberger resigned on May 5, citing six recent police shootings involving one Hispanic and five black men. Newberger said that he did not want to serve any longer because "I didn’t want to do anything that would further negatively impact on the 700-some-odd people in the department". Assistant police chief Austin McLane who had served for 2 years in that position was Newberger's replacement and served as the acting police chief until officially becoming the police chief on May 26. Newberger served as police chief until he left his position on September 27, 1991. As chief, he attempted to improve the department's community relations overall and especially with black residents. Once leaving Tampa's police department, he joined Augusta, Georgia's Police Department to serve as its chief until 1996 when voters approved the consolidation of Augusta and Richmond County. After consolidation, he would serve as the deputy chief of the Richmond County Sheriff's Office. McLane left the Sheriff's Office in 1999 before joining another one where he conducted fraud investigations until finally retiring in 2011. McLane died on January 15, 2021, at the age of 81.

Freeman introduced a home loan program for poor residents in the city along with a racial slur policy. Hair was buried at the same cemetery as Martin Chambers, whose death had sparked another riot in 1967.

=== Disciplinary and legal actions ===
After the death of Hair, the usage of chokeholds by the police was banned. David D’Agresta was suspended without pay and the State Attorney's Office for Hillsborough County charged him in connection with the event but an all-white jury acquitted him. Both officers who were involved with Miller's case were cleared of any wrongdoing on April 27, 1987, as assistant prosecutor, Charles A. Caruso said his death was a result of cardiac rhythm disturbance. Officer Johnson quit his job on May 6, saying he and his wife decided they wanted to return to St. Louis, Missouri where they had both lived prior to living in Tampa. A memo had been released by the municipal government that day saying Johnson's actions were not illegal, unconstitutional nor racially motivated but did end up violating Tampa's policy which limited using deadly force only to when a suspect posed "the threat of grave injury".

=== College Hill and Ponce de Leon areas ===
The College Hill and Ponce de Leon housing projects were scheduled for demolition during the 2000s as a part of the Hope VI program that begun in 1993 by the United States federal government to demolish public housing projects that were getting old, dealing with poverty, drugs and violence.

=== Further riots ===
Several other riots happened in College Hill in the 1980s. After the arrest of a robbery suspect, a disturbance occurred in April 1988. A crowd consisting of an estimated 400 people ended up throwing stones and bottles.

Another riot happened in the College Hill area on February 1, 1989, after the arrest of an African American man in the area who was a drug dealer named Edgar Allan Price by undercover police officers. At the time of Price's arrest, he was carrying 25 pieces of crack cocaine and a .25 caliber derringer in his pockets. He resisted arrest violently with one officer getting their nose broken. Initially, two officers responded but later one officer called for backup through his police radio and 6 others arrived as reinforcements, after which Price was subdued.

After Price's arrest, he collapsed in a police cruiser and later die at St. Joseph's Hospital from what would later be disclosed as cardiac arrest. During the riots, at least 100 police officers responded to the situation. Three injuries, apart from Price's, occurred during this outbreak of rioting. 30 firefighters responded to the situation as well. A crowd consisting of about 150 youths participated and a grocery store was looted, burned and stoned. The riots lasted for one hour in total and the College Hill area, spanning 22 blocks, was cordoned off. A news van was fired upon twice by a shotgun.

During the evening of February 2 and 3, further violence occurred over a period of three hours with 70 officers being sent in response. One officer was hospitalized at Tampa Memorial Hospital after being hit by a brick but later ended up getting released.

== See also ==
- 1967 Tampa riots
