= 1970 Augusta riot =

1970 race riot in Georgia, US

1970 Augusta Riot
- Date: May 11–12, 1970
- Location: Augusta, Georgia
- Caused by: Black citizens' grievances about racial injustice; White officials' intransigence
- Methods: Firebombing, Ransacking, Police Brutality

Parties
Black citizens	Augusta Police Department, Richmond County Sheriff's Department, Georgia National Guard, Georgia State Patrol

Casualties
- Deaths: 6
- Injuries: 80+

The Augusta Riot was a collective rebellion of Black citizens in Augusta, Georgia, and the largest urban uprising in the Deep South during the Civil Rights era. Fueled by long-simmering grievances about racial injustice, it was sparked by White officials’ stonewalling in the face of Black citizens’ demand for answers about the beating death of Black teenager Charles Oatman. At its height on the evening of May 11, 1970, 2,000 to 3,000 people participated, ransacking and set fire to White- and Chinese-American-owned businesses, damaging $1 million of property over a 130-block area. White police officers violently suppressed the riot, with the endorsement of Georgia governor Lester Maddox, shoot-to-kill orders from their captain, and reinforcements by the National Guard and State Patrol. Despite the suppression, the riot fundamentally shook the status quo, galvanizing a new wave of activism that opened economic and political doors for Augusta’s Black citizens.

== Context ==
Police brutality and severe poverty were deeply woven into the fabric of White supremacy in Augusta, and they showed no signs of weakening as a new decade dawned. Augusta’s Black organizations had different visions for bringing change: NAACP and SCLC chapters sought to expand the gains of the Civil Rights Movement and the Black Panther Party chapter. A cadre of Paine College students embraced the militancy and self-assertion of Black Power, and the Committee of Ten embodied a middle way, with a militant style but a focus on confronting White officials. Simmering tensions came to a head on the evening of May 9 when news began to circulate that Charles Oatman had been beaten to death in the county jail. The 16-year-old was a popular student at A.R. Johnson Junior High School. He was also mentally challenged. In a grim accident in late March, Oatman had fatally wounded his young niece in the kitchen of his family’s small house, but White authorities charged him with killing her and incarcerated him. Over the course of several weeks in the jail, he was brutally tortured and beaten, ultimately dying of his injuries. His badly mutilated body, with cigarette burns, marks from a fork, and a deep gash in the back of his head, was brought from the jail to University Hospital and then to Mays Mortuary on May 9.

== Rebellion and violent suppression ==
The news sent shock waves through Augusta’s Black community. The common anguish and rage had a unifying effect across lines of division, and Black citizens quickly mobilized. On the evening of May 10 several hundred demonstrated at the county jail, demanding answers from White officials but making little headway. Sheriff’s deputies were on hand (and on the jail’s roof) with weapons drawn. On the afternoon of May 11 a larger group demonstrated in front of the Municipal Building, and again they were confronted by shotgun-wielding police officers. When the news emerged that the sheriff had concluded his brief, tacit investigation and charged two Black teenagers with manslaughter, many were indignant to the point of rage. To the militants, this was “warfare” and had to be met with violence. They moved to Broad Street, roughing up window displays at White-owned stores, then moving to the heart of the Black neighborhood at 9th and Gwinnett Streets (today’s James Brown and Laney-Walker Boulevards). Reorganizing and with increased numbers—younger people and “plain neighborhood people” (working-class people intimately familiar with poverty and police brutality)—they began to ransack White- and Chinese-American-owned stores and to attack White motorists. As night fell, they began targeted acts of firebombing against White-owned stores, warehouses, and wholesale dealerships. Accounts differ sharply on the nature and ownership of the businesses targeted. Some officers and business owners claim that the protesters targeted all White and Chinese-American-owned businesses, destroying some Black-owned businesses in the midst. Others assert that Black-owned stores and the businesses of those White and Chinese-American people who were regarded as friendly to the Black community were marked with paint that read, “Soul Brother” and generally left alone.

Also as night fell, the police went into violent overdrive. They fired shotguns indiscriminately at African Americans: at people actively ransacking, at people who were simply bystanders, at people who simply lived in the neighborhood. Police shotgun blasts wounded at least 60 people and killed six: Charlie Mack Murphy (age 39), William Wright, Jr (18), Sammy McCullough (20), John Stokes (19), John Bennett (28), and Mack Wilson (45). Despite later claims by police that they acted in self-defense, the six men they killed were all unarmed and all shot in the back, and three were shot multiple times. By dawn on May 12, the riot that seemed on its way to becoming a Southern Watts or Detroit had been ruthlessly suppressed.

== Repressive reaction and renewed activism ==
In the months that followed, all-White juries convicted the two teenagers charged in Oatman's death, over 100 people active in the riot, and the militants who declared “warfare.” The police captain was promoted to chief, the mayor lavished praise on the police department, and the media and political leaders depicted the riot as nothing more than inherently violent people, an angry mob, getting violent and destroying their own neighborhood, for no reason. A major FBI investigation into excessive police force brought two officers to trial, but they were acquitted by overwhelmingly White juries. Charles Oatman’s mother filed a federal civil rights lawsuit, but it was dismissed on a technicality. No White official has been held accountable for any wrongdoing.

Despite these injustices, the riot galvanized a new wave of activism. The fears it generated gave activists new leverage in their demands for change. Black voters began to make substantive gains in local politics. A major lawsuit for school desegregation gained renewed momentum, and Black leadership of a newly created Human Relations Commission won numerous anti-discrimination cases and opened new doors for Black employment. Activists memorialized the six victims in solidarity with the four students killed at Kent State University a week earlier and the two students killed at Jackson State University three days later. Key participants continued to work for racial justice in Augusta and in other places, and they sought to preserve a very different account of the event. “The rebellion Monday, May 11,” a handbill circulating in the community that summer proclaimed, “was an effort of the Blacks in Augusta, in Georgia, and in Amerikka to seek liberation, freedom, and justice...The PEOPLE REVOLTED.”

Amid these changes, White supremacy showed its resiliency. Rapid White flight to neighboring Columbia County undercut the gains of school desegregation, the Human Relations Commission was weakened and ultimately defunded, and divestment mixed with a fragile capital base decimated the once-bustling principal Black neighborhood. Concentrated poverty continued as the economy shifted from industrial manufacturing to low-wage service jobs; in contemporary Augusta, 30% of Black households subsist below the federal poverty threshold. The criminality projected onto African Americans in 1970 continues, undergirding the racialized system of mass incarceration that legal scholar Michelle Alexander calls “the new Jim Crow.” And the White supremacist narrative of the riot became firmly established as the community’s dominant memory of what happened—erasing the memory of Black grievances, of Black organizing and political intent, and of Black gains in the wake of the rebellion of May 11-12.

A local group, the 1970 Augusta Riot Observance Committee, has been working to recover and honor the real story of this event, and the above summary is part of that work.

== See also ==
- List of incidents of civil unrest in the United States
