= Killing of Carnell Russ =

Assassination

Carnell Russ was a 24-year African American mill worker killed by white Star City, Arkansas police officer Charles Lee Ratliff on Memorial Day, May 31, 1971. Russ' death led to a change in federal law regarding the future prosecution of civil rights cases.

== Events of May 31 to April 1, 1971 ==
Russ, his wife Clementine, six of their nine children, and Clementine's cousin, were driving to their home in Monticello, Arkansas, after spending the weekend with his in-laws, when Russ was stopped for speeding by state trooper Jerry Green around 5:45 p.m. Russ was allegedly driving 75 mph on a stretch of Highway 81 through Lincoln County with a 60 mph speed limit. Green told Russ to follow him in his car to the Lincoln County Courthouse in Starr City, about six miles away. At the jail, Russ was met by Starr City police officers Charles Lee Ratliff and Norman Draper. Russ was told his bond was $23. Ratliff having declined to take a check, Russ returned to his car and retrieved $23 from his wife. Russ asked for a copy of the ticket which Ratliff would not provide, leading Russ to refuse to pay. According to Ratliff, when the officer took Russ by the arm, Russ jerked away and crouched in a fighting position and blows were exchanged. Ratliff claimed he struck Russ on the head with his service weapon and the weapon accidentally discharged, and Russ was shot between the eyes. Clementine Russ later said that Trooper Green told her that her husband had said "some smart word" to Officer Ratliff, which caused the officer to pistol whip her husband. Russ died at the University Hospital in Little Rock at 2:20 a.m.

== Subsequent investigations ==
An autopsy showed that Russ had been struck on the mouth and on the head. A firearms expert testified that Ratliff's gun was designed not to fire unless the trigger was pulled. Ratliff was later tried for voluntary manslaughter. In January 1972, an all-white Lincoln County jury found him innocent. Two years after his death, Russ' family filed a wrongful death lawsuit. An all-white jury again found Ratliff innocent of all charges.

The NAACP then filed suit against the U.S. Attorney General Edward Levi for failing to prosecute the Russ killing. The federal government's policy had been not to prosecute crimes that had already been adjudicated in state courts. The Carter Administration changed this policy to allow the FBI to investigate crimes "on their own merits" whether or not they had previously been prosecuted at the state level.

In April 1979, a federal jury awarded the family $288,000 in damages. Ratliff died before payment was made. The Carnell Russ Foundation was subsequently established in Russ' memory, with the aim of promoting community unity.

== Sources ==
- Taibbi, Matthew (26 October 2017). I Can't Breathe: The Killing that Started a Movement. New York: Random House. ISBN 9780753548677.
