= Benjamin Brown (activist) =

American activist (1945–1967)

- Born: May 12, 1945
- Died: May 12, 1967 (aged 22); Jackson, Mississippi, US
- Resting place: Sweet Rest Cemetery, Pearl, Rankin County, Mississippi, US
- Occupation: Student

Benjamin Brown (May 12, 1945 – May 12, 1967) was an African-American student at Jackson State University active in the civil rights movement, killed on campus during a standoff between law enforcement and students. Upon encountering the standoff (at the sidelines) after picking up a sandwich from a cafe to bring back to his wife, he was shot by two stray shotgun blasts from law enforcement firing into the crowd. No arrests were ever made.

In 2001, a Hinds County grand jury reviewed the case and blamed two deceased officers: Jackson police officer Buddy Kane and Mississippi Highway Patrolman Lloyd Jones. The Brown family filed a lawsuit and settled for $50,000 from the city of Jackson. There has been no marker on the JSU campus recognizing the events that took place.

The Southern Poverty Law Center memorialized Benjamin Brown as a civil rights martyr on a memorial designed by Maya Lin.
