= John Earl Reese =

African-American murder victim (1939–1955)

- Born: October 9, 1939; Gregg County, Texas, U.S.
- Died: October 23, 1955 (aged 16); Longview, Texas, U.S.
- Resting place: Smith Chapel Cemetery, Mayflower, Rusk County, Texas, USA

John Earl Reese (October 9, 1939 – October 23, 1955) was an African American teenager who was murdered in Gregg County, Texas.

Reese's killing is considered by authorities today to have been a hate crime, designed to thwart the creation of a new school in the community.

== Death and afterward ==
On October 22, 1955, Reese, along with his cousins Joyce Faye Crockett Nelson and Johnnie Crockett, were dancing in a local cafe. Two white men, Joe Simpson and Perry Dean Ross, shot the teenagers from a passing car. His cousins survived, but Reese died the next day.

The two suspects shot up some homes and churches and were then arrested. Ross, the shooter, was convicted of murder, and given a five-year suspended sentence. Simpson was indicted but the charge was dismissed.

The Civil Rights and Restorative Justice Project has taken the following steps in response to Reese's murder:

- amending the death certificate from accident to homicide
- overseeing the creation of new gravestones.
- renaming a local street to John Earl Reese Road
