= Florida Division of Alcoholic Beverages and Tobacco =

Statewide regulatory entity in Florida

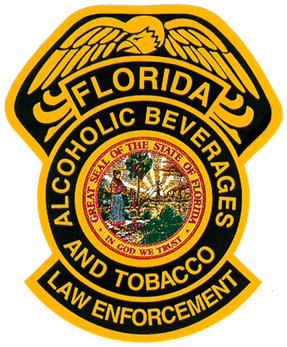
Florida Division of Alcoholic Beverages and Tobacco patch

The Division of Alcoholic Beverages and Tobacco (ABT) is the Florida state government agency which licenses and regulates the sale of alcoholic beverages and tobacco. It is part of the Florida Department of Business and Professional Regulation (DBPR).

The Division of Alcoholic Beverages and Tobacco is responsible for licensing the alcoholic beverage and tobacco industries, for collection and auditing of taxes and fees paid by the licensees, and for enforcing the laws and regulations of the alcoholic beverage and tobacco industries.

The Division has the mission of effective supervision of the distribution of alcoholic beverages and tobacco products to consumers in a free enterprise system; collection and deposit of all taxes and fees authorized by law; and provision of a safe, drug-free, and responsible hospitality industry to residents and tourists of Florida. Laws governing the agency can be found in Chapter 210, Chapters 561-565 and Chapters 567-569 of Florida Statutes.

These responsibilities and duties include licensing businesses, conducting criminal and administrative investigations; conducting audits, inventories and tax assessments; seizing non-tax paid alcoholic beverages and tobacco products; imposing penalties for violations; providing state resources to local governments to address alcoholic beverage and tobacco concerns; and encouraging licensees to properly operate their businesses. The responsibilities are carried out through three bureaus within the division - the Bureau of Licensing, the Bureau of Auditing, and the Bureau of Law Enforcement.

== History of ABT ==
The Division of Alcoholic Beverages and Tobacco was originally created as the "Malt and Vinous Beverage Department" in 1933 following the 21st Amendment to the U.S. Constitution which placed the responsibility of controlling the alcoholic beverage industry upon the states. Two years later it became the "State Beverage Department" and in 1945, the state's cigarette industry was added as a responsibility of the department. In 1969, the department was grouped with other business regulatory programs as a division under the Department of Business Regulation. The name was expanded to what it is today, the Division of Alcoholic Beverages and Tobacco, in 1977.

The Division is the second largest revenue-collecting agency in the State of Florida and collects an average of one billion dollars annually. It is the only division in DBPR with sworn law enforcement powers. Staffed with over 300 personnel, the division administers statewide control over the alcoholic beverage and tobacco industries with the mission of keeping alcohol and tobacco out of the hands of underage persons, ensuring that licensed establishments are in compliance with the laws and rules regulating the industry in Florida and collecting taxes and fees related to these industries.

== Bureaus ==
The Division is made up of three bureaus: Auditing, Licensing, and Law Enforcement.

=== Bureau of Law Enforcement ===
The Bureau of Law Enforcement is responsible for the management of ABT's law enforcement and investigation programs. These responsibilities include conducting license discipline investigations; providing guidance, direction and leadership to licensees; conducting criminal investigations pursuant to beverage and cigarette laws and statutes; and determining the need for using extraordinary emergency suspension powers when a business licensed by ABT has become an immediate danger to the health, safety and welfare of Florida's citizens.

The Bureau of Law Enforcement is divided into field offices located throughout the state. In addition to the license qualifications, criminal investigations and licensee inspections, the sworn law enforcement officers in the field concentrate their efforts on sales of unlawful drugs in businesses licensed by ABT, sales and service of alcoholic beverages and tobacco to underage persons, sales of false identification documents, sales of untaxed cigarettes, operation of unlawful gambling machines, and providing assistance to Auditing in the collection of authorized taxes and fees.

This Bureau fulfills these tasks using both sworn Special Agents and non-sworn civilian Investigative Specialists (Inspectors). Enforcement operates 12 district offices to fulfill its duties.

=== Bureau of Licensing ===
The Bureau of Licensing is responsible for the issuance of all alcoholic beverage licenses and cigarette or other tobacco product permits, and for the maintenance of all records pertaining to these licenses throughout the state. Florida law requires that licenses may only be issued to persons who are at least twenty-one years of age, are of good moral character, and who have not been convicted of certain criminal offenses within a prescribed period of time. This bureau determines if a license will be issued based upon the qualifications of the applicant, whether the premise meets all requirements based upon the type of license applied for, and whether the location is properly zoned.

Each applicant completes a detailed application form with the assistance of the field office staff. The application is reviewed, and if necessary, a detailed background investigation is conducted by the law enforcement bureau. The decision on whether to issue a license is based on a review of the application and information gathered. Licensing's central office staff then reviews or audits each license package and performs a microfilm history check on each applicant or interested party to the license. Further, all license renewals are performed by the central staff, and divided so that approximately 50% of the renewals are performed during a six-month period. In addition to reviewing and processing new applications, renewals and transfers, Licensing also conducts the annual double random selection Quota Licensing drawing as pursuant to Section 561.19(2), Florida statutes. This law provides for the issuing of new licenses in counties where the population has increased based on the 1980 census figures or based upon estimates of increasing population.

Aside from the above, the Bureau also performs brand registration of all alcoholic beverages, the registration of all salesman for spirituous beverages and wines, and the issuance of cooperative pool buying approvals, wholesale alcoholic beverage licenses, wholesale cigarette and other tobacco products permits, retail cigarette and other tobacco products permits, common carrier licenses for airplanes, trains, boats and other vehicle permits.

Licensing operates 11 district offices throughout the state to assist applicants and the public.

=== Bureau of Auditing ===
The Bureau Auditing is responsible for the auditing and collection of excise taxes levied upon alcoholic beverages, cigarettes, and other tobacco products sold in Florida, as well as the auditing and collection of surcharge on cigarettes and other tobacco products sold in Florida. The bureau is also responsible for the adherence to Florida Statutes by manufacturers, distributors, distributing agents, and dealers licensed or permitted by the Division of Alcoholic Beverages and Tobacco.

To accomplish said responsibilities, the Bureau employs field auditing personnel who perform tax and compliance audits of licensees, and central collection personnel who collect, process, and account for the revenues and tax report data. Licensees report and remit taxes on a monthly basis. These reports are reviewed and revenues verified by auditing staff. Excise tax and surcharge accounts are audited semi-annually, so as to assure proper collection and to promote strict compliance with the Florida beverage and tobacco laws, rules, and regulations.

The Bureau of Auditing is responsible for the collection and reconciliation of approximately two billion dollars annually. Collection sources are as noted above: alcoholic beverage excise taxes and cigarette/tobacco excise taxes and surcharges. Total revenue collected by the Division of Alcoholic Beverages and Tobacco during FY 2011-2012 was in excess of $1,813,000,000.

Auditing operates six district offices throughout the state to allow for Auditors to complete field work as well as providing a location to pay excise taxes.

== See also ==
- Alcohol law in the United States
- List of law enforcement agencies in Florida
- Alcohol and Tobacco Tax and Trade Bureau
- Bureau of Alcohol, Tobacco, Firearms and Explosives
