= John Hilliard (Alabama politician) =

American politician (born 1961)

Member of the Birmingham City Council from the 9th district
- In office October 24, 2017 – October 26, 2021
- Preceded by: Marcus Lundy
- Succeeded by: LaTonya Tate

Member of the Alabama House of Representatives from the 60th district
- In office June 17, 1993 – November 6, 2002
- Preceded by: Sundra Escott-Russell
- Succeeded by: Linda Coleman-Madison

Personal details
- Born: February 21, 1961 (age 65)
- Party: Democratic
- Children: 1
- Relatives: Earl Hilliard Sr. (uncle); Earl Hilliard Jr. (cousin)
- Education: Alabama State University (B.S.)
- Occupation: Real estate broker

John R. Hilliard (born February 21, 1961) is a Democratic politician from Alabama who served as a member of the Alabama House of Representatives from the 60th district from 1993 to 2002 and as a member of the Birmingham City Council from 2017 to 2021.

== Early life ==
Hilliard was born in 1961, and was raised by his grandparents, growing up with his uncle, Earl Hilliard. Hilliard attended the Alabama State University, graduating with his bachelor's degree in business administration, and ran the Alabama Community Assistance Problem, a "grassroots social services agency."

== Alabama House of Representatives ==
In 1993, State Representative Sundra Escott-Russell was elected to the Alabama Senate in a special election to succeed Earl Hilliard, who was elected to the U.S. House in 1992. Hilliard ran in the special election to succeed Escott-Russell in the State House. In the Democratic primary, he faced Bernard Kincaid, a professor at the University of Alabama at Birmingham; Birmingham city lobbyist Connie Goldsby; Tyrone Williams; and Shirley Hill. Hilliard placed first in the primary, winning 48 percent of the vote, and advanced to a runoff election with Kincaid, who placed second with 23 percent. Hilliard only narrowly defeated Kincaid in the runoff, winning by 15 votes. In the general election, Hilliard was challenged by businessman Walter Sturdivant, who ran as an independent, and Kincaid, who launched a write-in campaign. He won the general election by a wide margin, receiving 57 percent of the vote to Kincaid's 40 percent dn Sturdivant's 3 percent.

Hilliard ran for a second term in 1994, and was challenged in the Democratic primary by Randolph Strickland, a financial consultant. He defeated Strickland with 63 percent of the vote, and faced former State Representative Jim Wright, the Republican nominee, and Kincaid, who ran as an independent, in the general election. Hilliard won the general election, receiving 56 percent of the vote to Wright's 30 percent and Kincaid's 14 percent.

In 1998, Hilliard sought re-election to a third term. He was originally challenged by David Russell in the Democratic primary, but Russell was disqualified by the Alabama Democratic Party for not being a resident of the district. Russell subsequently ran as an independent in the general election. Hilliard defeated Russell in the general election, winning 84–16 percent.

Hilliard ran for a fourth term in 2002, and was challenged by a crowded field of candidates that included former City Councilwoman Linda Coleman and attorney Robert Mullins. Hilliard was endorsed by the Jefferson County Citizens Coalition, a local political machine started by former Mayor Richard Arrington Jr., while Mullins was supported by the Jefferson County Progressive Democrat Council, which supported Kincaid in his successful 1999 campaign for mayor. Hilliard ultimately placed second in the primary, winning 26 percent of the vote to Coleman's 39 percent and Mullins's 16 percent. He proceeded to a runoff with Coleman, which she won by a wide margin, winning 67 percent of the vote to Hilliard's 33 percent.

In 2010, Hilliard launched a campaign for the State House when his cousin, State Representative Earl Hilliard Jr., ran for Congress rather than seek re-election. He ran against attorneys Juandalynn Givan and Ralph Mayes, insurance agent David Russell, and consultant Sharon Byrd Lewis in the Democratic primary, and placed second, receiving 30 percent of the vote to Givan's 38 percent. Givan defeated Hilliard in the runoff, winning 63 percent of the vote to his 37 percent.

== Birmingham City Council ==
Hilliard ran for the Birmingham City Council from the 9th district in 2017. He faced six opponents in the nonpartisan primary, including Roderick Royal, the former president of the City Council who had briefly acted as mayor. In the primary, Royal placed first, receiving 31 percent of the vote to Hilliard's 22 percent. He and Royal advanced to a runoff election, which Hilliard narrowly won, defeating Royal with 51 percent of the vote.

In 2021, Hilliard ran for re-election, and was challenged by LaTonya Tate, Eric Hall, and David Russell. He placed first in the election, but fell short of a majority, receiving 49 percent of the vote to Tate's 29 percent, and they advanced to a runoff election. Tate narrowly won the election, defeating Hilliard with 52 percent of the vote. Hilliard challenged Tate for re-election in 2025. He placed second in the primary election, receiving 29 percent of the vote to her 45 percent. In the runoff, she defeated him with 56 percent of the vote.
