= 2009–10 Birmingham, Alabama mayoral special election =

- December 8, 2009 (primary); January 19, 2010 (runoff)
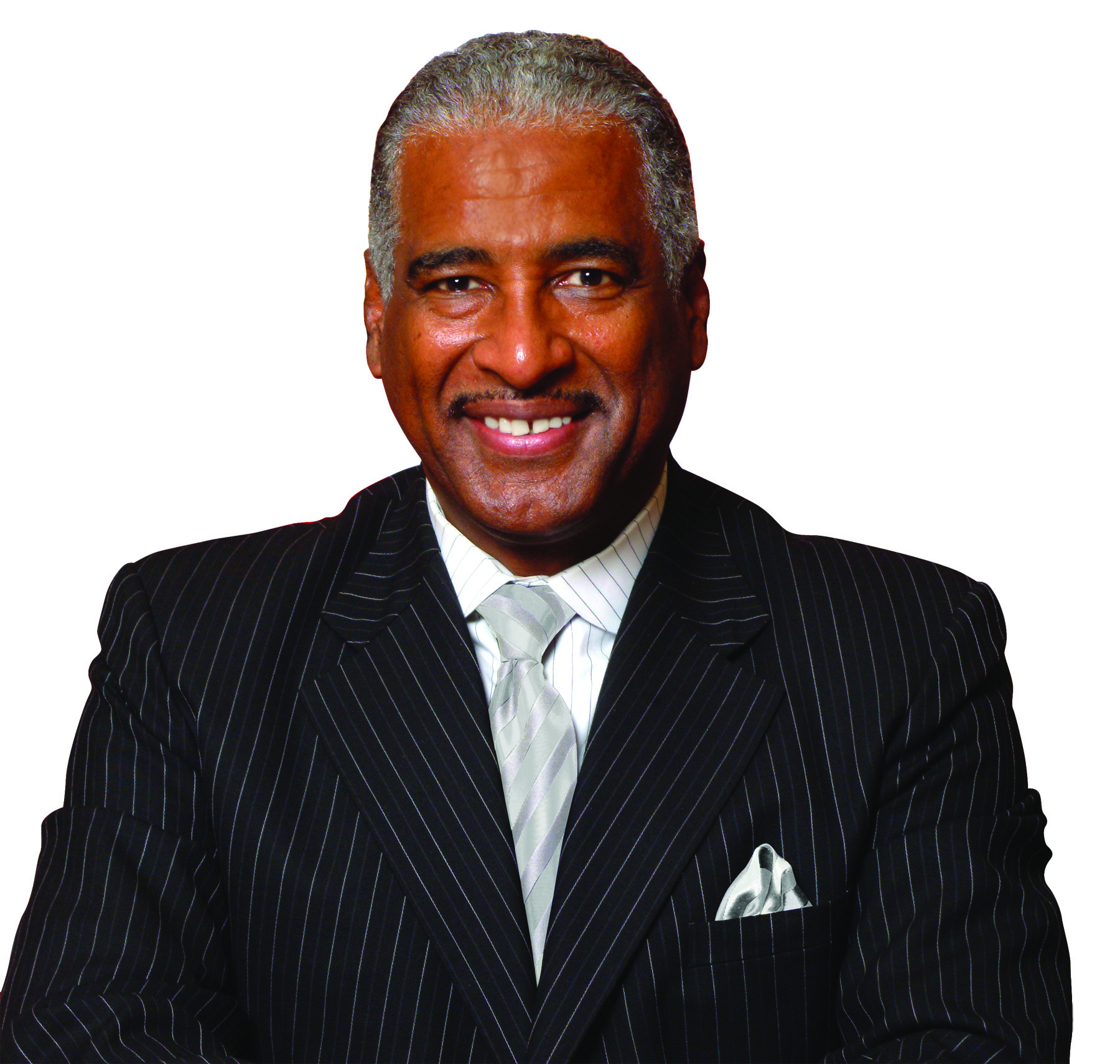

Candidate	William A. Bell	Patrick Cooper
First round	8,758; 25.05%	14,004; 40.05%
Runoff	25,369; 53.56%	21,996; 46.44%
Candidate	Carole Smitherman	Emory Anthony Jr.
First round	6,559; 18.76%	4,349; 12.44%
Mayor before election
Roderick Royal (acting)
Nonpartisan
Elected mayor
William A. Bell
Nonpartisan

The 2009–10 Birmingham, Alabama mayoral special election was held on January 19, 2010, following a special primary election on December 8, 2009, to elect the mayor of Birmingham, Alabama. Former Mayor Larry Langford was convicted on sixty counts of bribery-related charges on October 28, 2009, and he was automatically removed from office, elevating City Council President Carole Smitherman to the role. The Birmingham Election Commission subsequently scheduled a special election.

Smitherman announced that she would run in the special election, though on November 24, 2009, the City Council elected Roderick Royal as its new President, empowering him to replace Smitherman as acting Mayor.

Fourteen candidates ran in the special election, with County Commissioner and former interim Mayor William A. Bell, Smitherman, City Councilman Steven Hoyt, and attorneys Patrick Cooper and Emory Anthony Jr., emerging as the leading candidates. In the primary election, Cooper placed first with 40 percent, and advanced to a runoff election with Bell, who received 25 percent. In the runoff election, Bell defeated Cooper by a narrow margin, winning 54 percent of the vote to Cooper's 46 percent.

== Primary election ==
=== Candidates ===
- Patrick Cooper, attorney, 2007 candidate for Mayor
- William A. Bell, Jefferson County Commissioner, former interim Mayor
- Carole Smitherman, former acting Mayor
- Emory Anthony Jr., attorney
- Steven Hoyt, City Councilman
- Scott Douglas, interfaith community program manager
- Jody Trautwein, youth pastor
- Harry "Traveling Shoes" Turner Jr., evangelist, roller skating teacher
- Stephannie S. Huey, teacher, 2003 candidate for Mayor, 1999 candidate for Mayor of Denver
- T. C. Cannon, businessman
- William Jason Sumners, photo studio owner
- Edith Mayomi, substitute teacher
- Jimmy Snow, food store owner
- Ernie S. Dunn, former home improvement business owner (deceased)

=== Results ===
Primary election results
Party	Candidate	Votes	%
Nonpartisan	Patrick Cooper	14,004	40.05%
Nonpartisan	William A. Bell	8,758	25.05%
Nonpartisan	Carole Smitherman	6,559	18.76%
Nonpartisan	Emory Anthony Jr.	4,349	12.44%
Nonpartisan	Steven Hoyt	641	1.83%
Nonpartisan	Scott Douglas	201	0.57%
Nonpartisan	Jody Trautwein	173	0.49%
Nonpartisan	Harry "Traveling Shoes" Turner Jr.	81	0.23%
Nonpartisan	Stephannie S. Huey	60	0.17%
Nonpartisan	T. C. Cannon	41	0.12%
Nonpartisan	William Sumners	31	0.09%
Nonpartisan	Edith Mayomi	28	0.08%
Nonpartisan	Jimmy Snow	23	0.07%
Nonpartisan	Ernie Dunn	13	0.04%
Total votes		34,962	100.00%

== General election ==
=== Results ===
2009–10 Birmingham mayoral special election results
Party	Candidate	Votes	%
Nonpartisan	William A. Bell	25,369	53.56%
Nonpartisan	Patrick Cooper	21,996	46.44%
Total votes		47,365	100.00%
