= 2003 Birmingham, Alabama mayoral election =

← 1999	October 14, 2003 (primary); November 4, 2003 (runoff)	2007 →
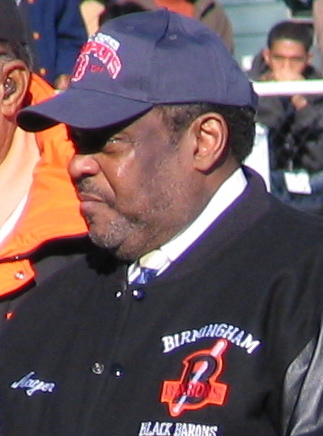

Candidate	Bernard Kincaid	Carole Smitherman
First round	14,442; 32.23%	10,185; 22.73%
Runoff	25,459; 54.35%	21,383; 45.65%
Candidate	William A. Bell	Bob Jones
First round	8,077; 18.03%	5,402; 12.06%
Runoff	Eliminated	Eliminated
Mayor before election
Bernard Kincaid
Nonpartisan
Elected mayor
Bernard Kincaid
Nonpartisan

The 2003 Birmingham, Alabama mayoral election was held on November 4, 2003, following a primary election on October 14, 2003, to elect the mayor of Birmingham, Alabama. Incumbent Mayor Bernard Kincaid ran for re-election to a second term. He faced seventeen opponents in the election, including former interim Mayor William A. Bell, whom Kincaid had defeated in 1999, and City Councilmembers Carole Smitherman, Lee Loder, Roderick Royal, and Gwen Sykes.

In the primary election, Kincaid received 32 percent of the vote. He faced Smitherman, who defeated Bell for second place, 23–18 percent, in the runoff election. Kincaid defeated Smitherman in the runoff election with 54 percent of the vote.

== Primary election ==
=== Candidates ===
- Bernard Kincaid, incumbent Mayor
- Carole Smitherman, City Councilwoman
- William A. Bell, former interim Mayor
- Bob Jones, attorney, former member of Birmingham Park and Recreation Board
- Paul Hollman, pastor of the Greater Beulah Missionary Baptist Church
- Lee Loder, City Council President
- Roderick Royal, City Councilman
- T. C. Cannon, bar owner
- Frank Matthews, radio host, businessman
- Gwen Sykes, City Councilwoman
- Mary Jones, community activist
- Willis Hendrix, retired attorney
- Eloise Manning Crenshaw, teacher
- Stephannie Huey, teacher, 1999 candidate for Mayor of Denver
- Sandy Bergeron, community activist
- Eugene Edelman, teacher
- James King, former radio talk show host
- Brian Taylor, coal miner

=== Results ===
Primary election results
Party	Candidate	Votes	%
Nonpartisan	Bernard Kincaid (inc.)	14,442	32.23%
Nonpartisan	Carole Smitherman	10,185	22.73%
Nonpartisan	William A. Bell	8,077	18.03%
Nonpartisan	Bob Jones	5,402	12.06%
Nonpartisan	Paul Hollman	2,131	4.76%
Nonpartisan	Lee Loder	1,767	3.94%
Nonpartisan	Roderick Royal	1,700	3.79%
Nonpartisan	T. C. Cannon	196	0.44%
Nonpartisan	Frank Matthews	178	0.40%
Nonpartisan	Gwen Sykes	170	0.38%
Nonpartisan	Mary Jones	132	0.29%
Nonpartisan	Willis Hendrix	94	0.21%
Nonpartisan	Eloise Manning Crenshaw	69	0.15%
Nonpartisan	Stephannie Sigler Huey	63	0.14%
Nonpartisan	Sandy Bergeron	58	0.13%
Nonpartisan	Eugene Edelman	54	0.12%
Nonpartisan	James King	49	0.11%
Nonpartisan	Brian Taylor	39	0.09%
Total votes		44,806	100.00%

== Runoff election ==
=== Results ===
2003 Birmingham mayoral runoff results
Party	Candidate	Votes	%
Nonpartisan	Bernard Kincaid (inc.)	25,459	54.35%
Nonpartisan	Carole Smitherman	21,383	45.65%
Total votes		46,842	100.00%
