= Earl Hilliard Jr. =

American politician (born 1969)

Member of the Alabama House of Representatives from the 60th district
- In office November 8, 2006 – November 3, 2010
- Preceded by: Linda Coleman-Madison
- Succeeded by: Juandalynn Givan

Personal details
- Born: June 16, 1969 (age 57) Montgomery, Alabama
- Party: Democratic
- Spouse: Janine
- Children: 2
- Relatives: Earl Hilliard Sr. (father); John Hilliard (cousin)
- Education: Morehouse College (B.A.); University of Alabama School of Law; Howard University School of Law (J.D.)
- Occupation: Attorney, lobbyist, filmmaker

Earl Hilliard Jr. (born June 16, 1969) is a Democratic politician, attorney, and former lobbyist from Alabama who served as a member of the Alabama House of Representatives from the 60th district from 2006 to 2010.

== Early life ==
Hilliard was born in Montgomery, Alabama, on June 16, 1969, and is the son of former Congressman Earl Hilliard Sr. He attended John Carroll Catholic High School in Birmingham, and graduated from Morehouse College in Atlanta, receiving his bachelor's degree in marketing. Hilliard then attended the University of Alabama School of Law and ultimately graduated with his juris doctor from the Howard University School of Law.

== Career ==
Hilliard worked as a lobbyist for The Coca-Cola Company and for Morehouse before returning to Birmingham to practice law.

== Alabama House of Representatives ==
In 2006, Hilliard ran for the Alabama House of Representatives from the 60th district, which was based in North Birmingham. He initially challenged incumbent Representative Linda Coleman in the Democratic primary, but Coleman opted to challenge State Senator Sundra Escott. In the Democratic primary, Hilliard faced former Birmingham City Councilman Leroy Bandy; Connie Goldsby, an aide to Mayor Bernard Kincaid; teacher Michael Pruitt; and insurance agent David Russell.

Hilliard placed first in the primary, winning 40 percent of the vote, but because he did not receive a majority, he proceeded to a runoff with Goldsby, who placed second with 22 percent. In the runoff election, Hillard ultimately defeated Goldsby, winning 57 percent of the vote to her 43 percent. He was elected unopposed in the general election.

== 2010 congressional campaign ==
In 2010, Congressman Artur Davis, who had defeated Hilliard's father in the 2002 Democratic primary, opted to run for governor rather than seek re-election. Hilliard ran to succeed him in the 7th district, the state's only Black-majority district. He was opposed in the Democratic primary by attorney Martha Bozeman, Selma Mayor James Perkins, attorney Terri Sewell, and Jefferson County Commissioner Sheila Smoot, though Perkins ended his campaign prior to the primary. Hilliard narrowly placed third in the primary, winning 27 percent of the vote to Smoot's 29 percent and Sewell's 37 percent, and did not advance to the runoff.

== 2014 Jefferson County Commission campaign ==
Hilliard ran for the Jefferson County Commission in 2014 from the 1st district, challenging incumbent County Commissioner George Bowman in the Democratic primary. He was joined in the primary by Roderick Royal, the former President of the Birmingham City Council. He placed second in the primary, winning 32 percent of the vote to Bowman's 40 percent and Royal's 27 percent. Hilliard and Bowman advanced to a runoff, which Bowman won by a wide margin, 59–41 percent.
