= 2013 Birmingham, Alabama mayoral election =

- August 27, 2013
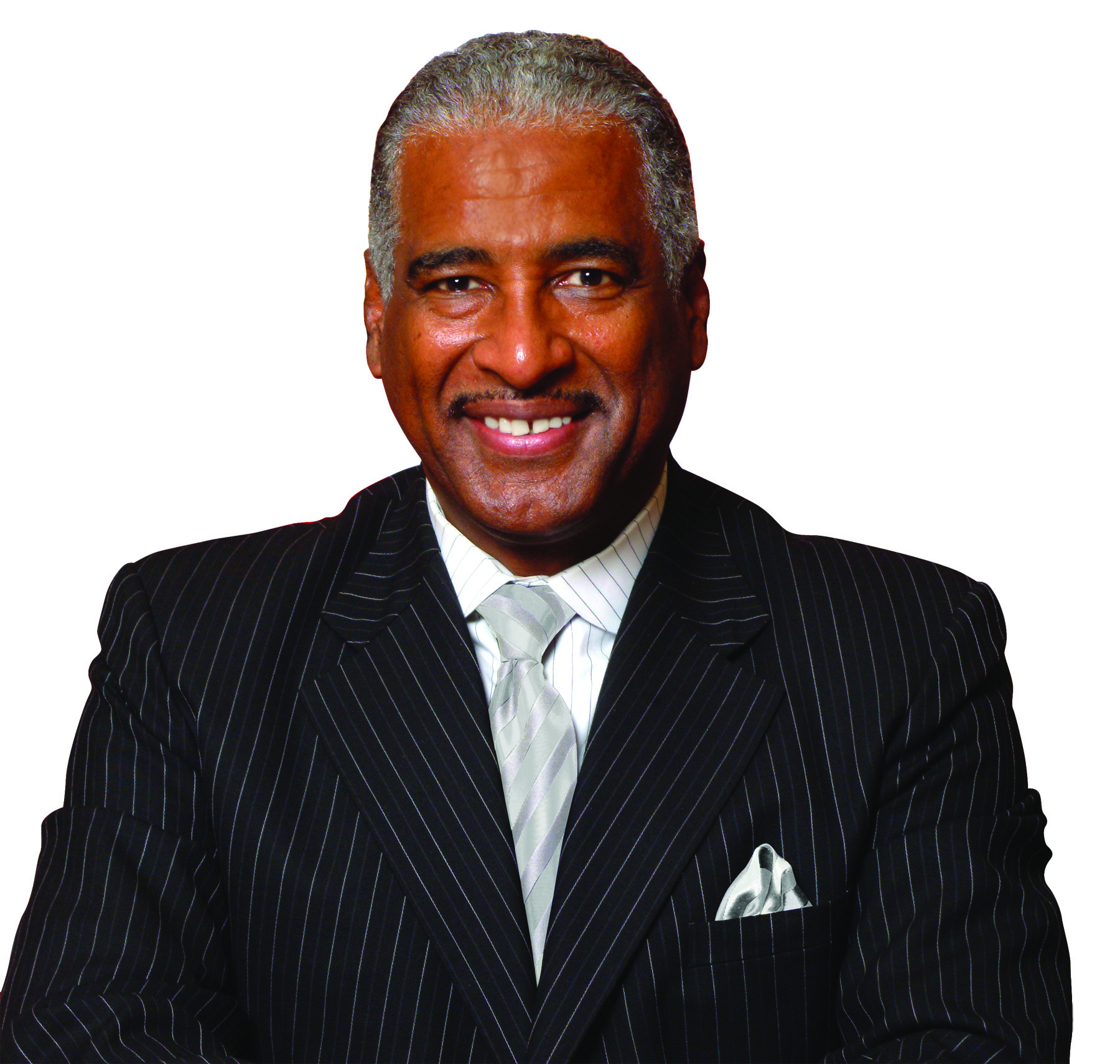

Candidate	William A. Bell	Kamau Afrika
Party	Nonpartisan	Nonpartisan
Popular vote	20,139	2,353
Percentage	82.04%	9.58%
Mayor before election
William A. Bell
Nonpartisan
Elected mayor
William A. Bell
Nonpartisan

The 2013 Birmingham, Alabama mayoral election was held on August 27, 2013, to elect the mayor of Birmingham, Alabama. Incumbent Mayor William A. Bell, who was first elected in a 2010 special election and re-elected to a two-year term in 2011, ran for re-election to his first full term as mayor. He faced a little-known field of challengers and won re-election in a landslide, receiving 82 percent of the vote.

== General election ==
=== Candidates ===
- William A. Bell, incumbent Mayor
- Kamau Afrika, real estate investor, perennial candidate
- Pat Bell, entrepreneur, perennial candidate
- Stephannie Sigler Huey, math teacher

=== Results ===
2013 Birmingham mayoral election results
Party	Candidate	Votes	%
Nonpartisan	William A. Bell (inc.)	20,139	82.04%
Nonpartisan	Kamau Afrika	2,353	9.58%
Nonpartisan	Pat Bell	1,060	4.32%
Nonpartisan	Stephannie Sigler Huey	997	4.06%
Total votes		24,549	100.00%
