= 1999 Birmingham, Alabama mayoral election =

- October 12, 1999 (primary); November 2, 1999 (runoff)
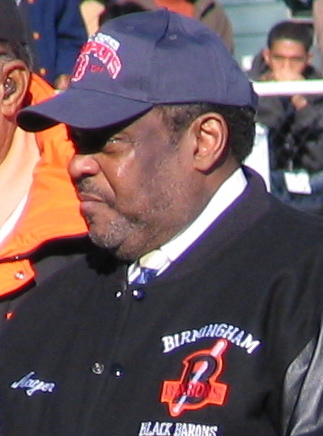

Candidate	Bernard Kincaid	William A. Bell	Bill Johnson
First round	19,625; 26.69%	36,278; 49.35%	9,149; 12.44%
Runoff	32,169; 50.90%	31,033; 49.10%	Eliminated
Mayor before election
William A. Bell (interim)
Nonpartisan
Elected mayor
Bernard Kincaid
Nonpartisan

The 1999 Birmingham, Alabama mayoral election was held on November 2, 1999, following a primary election on October 12, 1999, to elect the mayor of Birmingham, Alabama. Mayor Richard Arrington Jr. announced that he would not seek another term, and resigned from office on July 19, 1999, elevating City Council President William A. Bell as interim Mayor.

Bell ran for re-election with Arrington's endorsement, and faced a crowded field of opponents, including City Councilmen Bill Johnson and Bernard Kincaid, State Representative George Perdue, and former County Commissioner Reuben Davis. In the primary election, Bell fell just short of an outright majority, winning 49 percent of the vote, and proceeded to a runoff election with Kincaid, who placed second with 27 percent. Despite Bell's advantages in the election, Kincaid ultimately defeated him by a narrow margin in the runoff election, receiving 51 percent of the vote to Bell's 49 percent.

== Primary election ==
=== Candidates ===
- William A. Bell, interim Mayor
- Bernard Kincaid, City Councilman
- Bill Johnson, City Councilman
- Horace Huntley, University of Alabama at Birmingham history professor
- George Perdue, State Representative
- Pat Bell, public relations consultant
- Chief Red Feather, retired U.S. Navy SEAL
- Renda Williams, city worker
- Reuben Davis, former Jefferson County Commissioner
- Noel Leonard, county government employee
- Lester Cobb, roofing contractor
- Phillip Love, car salesman
- Ardella Y. Bland Ford, sheet metal worker
- Wayne Sowell, perennial candidate

==== Declined ====
- Earl Hilliard Sr., U.S. Representative from Alabama's 7th congressional district
- Larry Langford, Mayor of Fairfield, former Birmingham City Councilman, 1979 candidate for Mayor
- Carole Smitherman, former Circuit Judge

=== Results ===
Primary election results
Party	Candidate	Votes	%
Nonpartisan	William A. Bell (inc.)	36,278	49.35%
Nonpartisan	Bernard Kincaid	19,625	26.69%
Nonpartisan	Bill Johnson	9,149	12.44%
Nonpartisan	Horace Huntley	2,782	3.78%
Nonpartisan	George Perdue	2,780	3.78%
Nonpartisan	Pat Bell	1,008	1.37%
Nonpartisan	Chief Red Feather	868	1.18%
Nonpartisan	Renda Williams	237	0.32%
Nonpartisan	Reuben Davis	155	0.21%
Nonpartisan	Noel Leonard	152	0.21%
Nonpartisan	Lester Cobb	144	0.20%
Nonpartisan	Phillip Love	143	0.19%
Nonpartisan	Ardella Y. Bland Ford	110	0.15%
Nonpartisan	Wayne Sowell	88	0.12%
Total votes		73,519	100.00%

== Runoff election ==
=== Results ===
1999 Birmingham mayoral runoff results
Party	Candidate	Votes	%
Nonpartisan	Bernard Kincaid	32,169	50.90%
Nonpartisan	William A. Bell (inc.)	31,033	49.10%
Total votes		63,202	100.00%
