= 2007 Birmingham, Alabama mayoral election =

- October 9, 2007
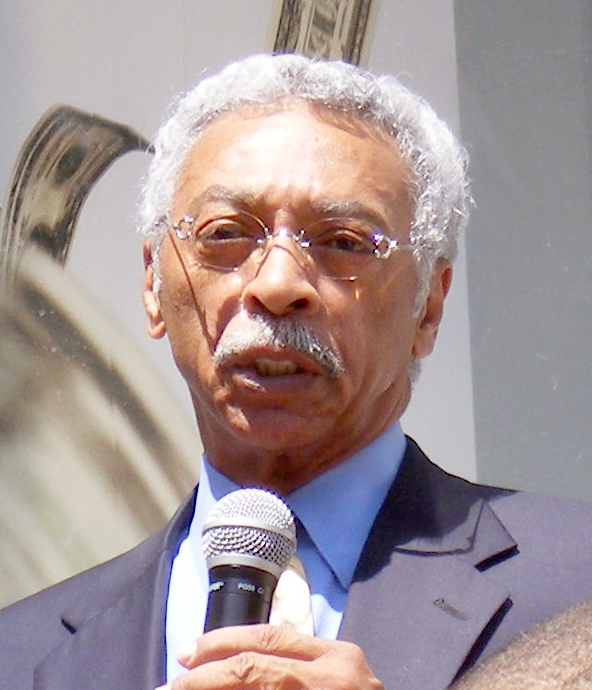

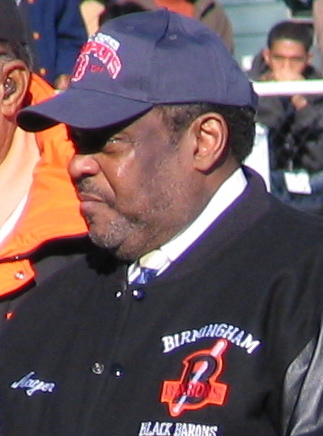
Candidate	Larry Langford	Patrick C. Cooper	Bernard Kincaid
Party	Nonpartisan	Nonpartisan	Nonpartisan
Popular vote	26,230	15,396	4,234
Percentage	50.33%	29.54%	8.12%
Mayor before election
Bernard Kincaid
Nonpartisan
Elected mayor
Larry Langford
Nonpartisan

The 2007 Birmingham, Alabama mayoral election was held on October 9, 2007, to elect the mayor of Birmingham, Alabama. Incumbent Mayor Bernard Kincaid ran for re-election to a third term. However, amid rising crime rates, Kincaid faced a difficult re-election campaign.

County Commissioner Larry Langford, who previously ran for Mayor in 1979; attorney Patrick Cooper; former interim Mayor William A. Bell; and City Councilwomen Carole Smitherman and Valerie Abbott emerged as Kincaid's leading competitors. In the election, Langford narrowly won a majority of the vote, receiving 50.3 percent, and avoiding the need for a runoff election.

However, Cooper, who placed second with 30 percent of the vote, declined to concede, noting, "There are some irregularities." Cooper filed a legal challenge to the results, arguing that at the time of the election, Langford was not a legal resident of the city. Cooper's lawsuit was dismissed, and he initially appealed it to the Alabama Supreme Court, seeking to have the case heard on an expedited schedule. However, he dismissed the challenge on December 17, 2007, saying, "I think I was right, but sometimes you must subordinate what you think is right for what is best for the city."

However, Langford did not serve out his full term as Mayor. He was indicted by federal prosecutors on December 1, 2008, on bribery charges, and he was convicted of sixty separate counts of bribery-related charges on October 28, 2009, resulting in his automatic removal from office.

== General election ==
=== Candidates ===
- Larry Langford, Jefferson County Commissioner
- Patrick Cooper, attorney
- Bernard Kincaid, incumbent Mayor
- William A. Bell, former interim Mayor
- Carole Smitherman, City Council President
- Valerie Abbott, City Councilman
- Barry Taylor, city inspector
- Darryl Perry, baggage handler
- Raymond Brooks, former Chief of the Birmingham Fire and Rescue Service
- Buddy Hendrix, retired attorney, 2003 candidate for Mayor

=== Results ===
2007 Birmingham mayoral election results
Party	Candidate	Votes	%
Nonpartisan	Larry Langford	26,230	50.33%
Nonpartisan	Patrick Cooper	15,396	29.54%
Nonpartisan	Bernard Kincaid	4,234	8.12%
Nonpartisan	William A. Bell	3,505	6.73%
Nonpartisan	Carole Smitherman	1,804	3.46%
Nonpartisan	Valerie Abbott	736	1.41%
Nonpartisan	Barry Taylor	71	0.14%
Nonpartisan	Darryl Perry	59	0.11%
Nonpartisan	Raymond Brooks	42	0.08%
Nonpartisan	Biddu Hendrix	41	0.08%
Total votes		52,118	100.00%
