= 2011 Birmingham, Alabama mayoral election =

- August 23, 2011
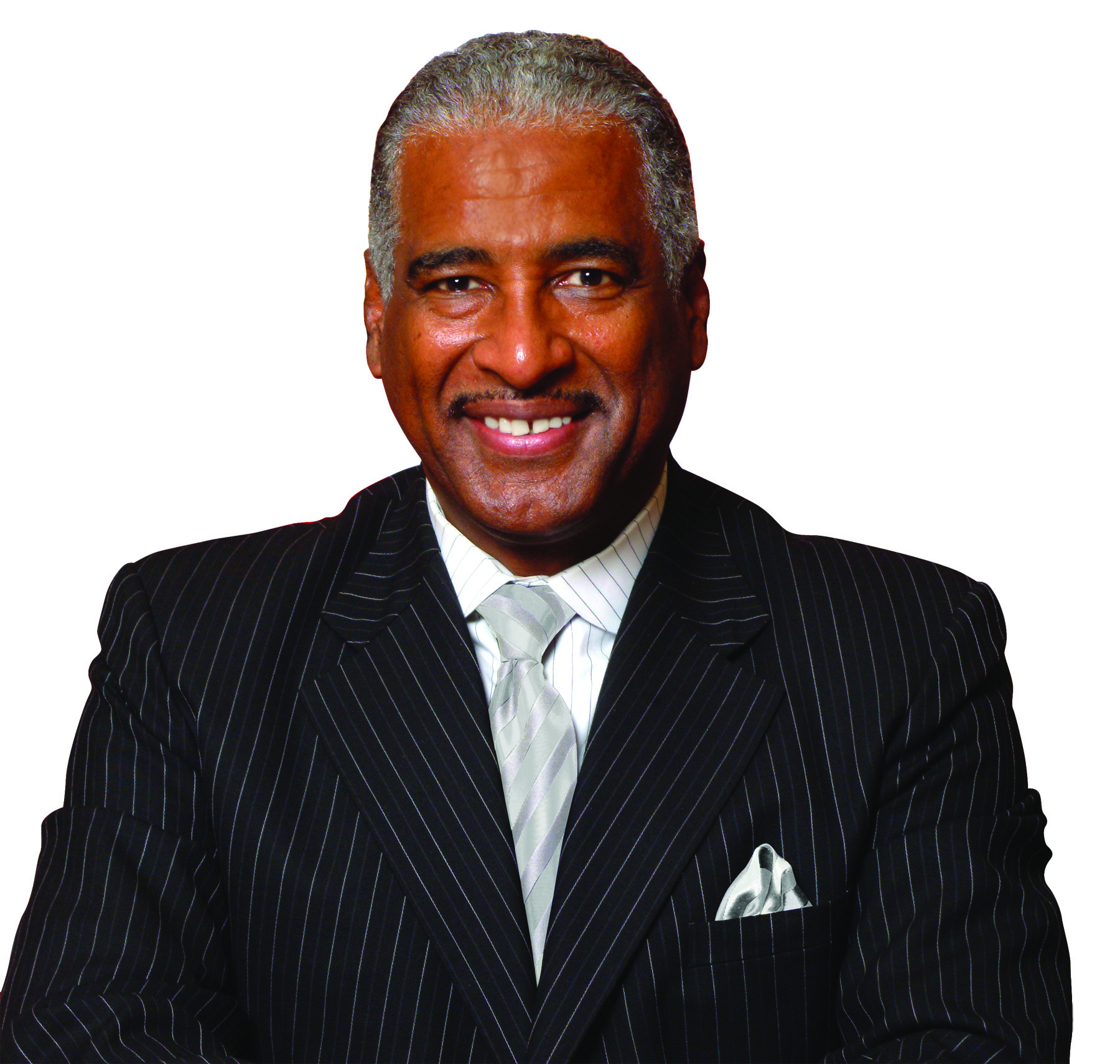

Candidate	William A. Bell	Pat Bell	Kamau Afrika
Party	Nonpartisan	Nonpartisan	Nonpartisan
Popular vote	15,947	655	617
Percentage	88.96%	3.65%	3.44%
Mayor before election
William A. Bell
Nonpartisan
Elected mayor
William A. Bell
Nonpartisan

The 2011 Birmingham, Alabama mayoral election was held on August 23, 2011, to elect the mayor of Birmingham, Alabama. In 2009, the City Council consolidated the mayoral and city council elections by moving the timing of mayoral elections. A legal challenge to the change was rejected by the Circuit Court, and ultimately by the Alabama Supreme Court. As a result, the winner of the 2011 mayoral election would only serve a two-year term.

Incumbent Mayor William A. Bell, who was first elected in a 2010 special election, ran for re-election. He faced little-known opponents, and won re-election in a landslide, receiving 89 percent of the vote.

== General election ==
=== Candidates ===
- William A. Bell, incumbent Mayor
- Pat Bell, 1995 and 1999 candidate for Mayor
- Kamau Afrika, perennial candidate
- Harry "Traveling Shoes" Turner Jr., perennial candidate
- T. C. Cannon, bar owner, perennial candidate
- Buddy Hendrix, perennial candidate

=== Results ===
2011 Birmingham mayoral election results
Party	Candidate	Votes	%
Nonpartisan	William A. Bell (inc.)	15,947	88.96%
Nonpartisan	Pat Bell	655	3.65%
Nonpartisan	Kamau Afrika	617	3.44%
Nonpartisan	Harry "Traveling Shoes" Turner Jr.	286	1.60%
Nonpartisan	T. C. Cannon	263	1.47%
Nonpartisan	Willis H. Buddy Hendrix	158	0.88%
Total votes		17,926	100.00%

William A. Bell has continued mayor win till 2017
