= Linda Coleman =

Linda Coleman may refer to:

- Linda Coleman (North Carolina politician) (born 1949), American politician from North Carolina
- Linda F. Coleman (born 1961), American lawyer, judge, and politician from Mississippi
- Linda Coleman-Madison, American politician from Alabama
