= John Hilliard =

John Hilliard may refer to:

- John Hilliard (American football) (born 1976), American football player
- John Hilliard (artist) (born 1945), London-based conceptual artist, photographer and academic
- John Kenneth Hilliard (1901–1989), American acoustical engineer and loudspeaker designer
- John Northern Hilliard (1872–1935), author of a best-selling book on magic, Greater Magic
- John S. Hilliard (born 1947), American composer
- John Hilliard (Alabama politician) (born 1961), American politician from Alabama
