= Alabama's 20th Senate district =

Alabama's 20th State Senate district
Senator
Linda Coleman-Madison; D–Birmingham
- Demographics: 25.4% White; 65.3% Black; 5.3% Hispanic; 0.7% Asian
- Population (2022): 137,423

Alabama's 20th Senate district is one of 35 districts in the Alabama Senate. The district has been represented by Linda Coleman-Madison since 2006.

== Geography ==
Election	Map	Counties in District
2026; 2022		Portion of Jefferson
2018		Portion of Jefferson
2014		Portion of Jefferson
2010; 2006; 2002		Portion of Jefferson

== Election history ==
=== Elections in the 2020s ===
Alabama Senate election, 2022: Senate District 20
Party	Candidate	Votes	%	±%
Democratic	Linda Coleman-Madison (Incumbent)	27,567	98.54	+0.20
Write-in		409	1.46	-0.20
Majority		27,158	97.08	+0.39
Turnout		27,976		
Democratic hold				

=== Elections in the 2010s ===
Alabama Senate election, 2018: Senate District 20
Party	Candidate	Votes	%	±%
Democratic	Linda Coleman-Madison (Incumbent)	36,478	98.34	−0.18
Write-in		614	1.66	+0.18
Majority		35,864	96.69	−0.36
Turnout		37,092		
Democratic hold				

Alabama Senate election, 2014: Senate District 20
Party	Candidate	Votes	%	±%
Democratic	Linda Coleman-Madison (Incumbent)	23,368	98.52	−0.56
Write-in		350	1.48	+0.56
Majority		23,018	97.05	−1.11
Turnout		23,718		
Democratic hold				

Alabama Senate election, 2010: Senate District 20
Party	Candidate	Votes	%	±%
Democratic	Linda Coleman-Madison (Incumbent)	28,282	99.08	+19.51
Write-in		263	0.92	+0.82
Majority		28,019	98.16	+38.92
Turnout		28,545		
Democratic hold				

=== Elections in the 2000s ===
Alabama Senate election, 2006: Senate District 20
Party	Candidate	Votes	%	±%
Democratic	Linda Coleman-Madison	21,661	79.57	−19.10
Republican	Mel C. Glenn	5,535	20.33	+20.33
Write-in		26	0.10	-1.23
Majority		16,126	59.24	−38.09
Turnout		27,222		
Democratic hold				

Alabama Senate election, 2002: Senate District 20
Party	Candidate	Votes	%	±%
Democratic	Sundra Escott-Russell (Incumbent)	28,775	98.67	+18.51
Write-in		389	1.33	+1.24
Majority		28,386	97.33	+36.93
Turnout		29,164		
Democratic hold				

=== Elections in the 1990s ===
Alabama Senate election, 1998: Senate District 20
Party	Candidate	Votes	%	±%
Democratic	Sundra Escott-Russell (Incumbent)	23,173	80.16	−18.76
Republican	Kenneth Bonham	5,710	19.75	+19.75
Write-in		27	0.09	-0.99
Majority		17,463	60.40	−37.45
Turnout		28,910		
Democratic hold				

Alabama Senate election, 1994: Senate District 20
Party	Candidate	Votes	%	±%
Democratic	Sundra Escott-Russell	22,612	98.92	−0.05
Write-in		246	1.08	+0.05
Majority		22,366	97.85	−0.08
Turnout		22,858		
Democratic hold				

Alabama Senate election, 1990: Senate District 20
Party	Candidate	Votes	%	±%
Democratic	Earl Hilliard Sr. (Incumbent)	22,189	98.97	−1.03
Write-in		232	1.03	+1.03
Majority		21,957	97.93	−2.07
Turnout		22,421		
Democratic hold				

=== Elections in the 1980s ===
Alabama Senate election, 1986: Senate District 20
Party	Candidate	Votes	%	±%
Democratic	Earl Hilliard Sr. (Incumbent)	27,032	100.00	+13.95
Majority		27,032	100.00	+27.90
Turnout		27,032		
Democratic hold				

Alabama Senate election, 1983: Senate District 20
Party	Candidate	Votes	%	±%
Democratic	Earl Hilliard Sr.	7,261	86.05	+9.07
Republican	Franklin Tate	1,177	13.95	−9.07
Majority		6,084	72.10	+18.14
Turnout		8,438		
Democratic hold				

Alabama Senate election, 1982: Senate District 20
Party	Candidate	Votes	%	±%
Democratic	Donald G. Holmes (Incumbent)	18,949	76.98	
Republican	Charles Green	5,667	23.02	
Majority		13,282	53.96	
Turnout		24,616		
Democratic hold				

== District officeholders ==
Senators take office at midnight on the day of their election.

- Linda Coleman-Madison (2006–present)
- Sundra Escott-Russell (1994–2006)
- Earl Hilliard Sr. (1983–1994)
- Donald G. Holmes (1978–1983)
- Donald Stewart (1974–1978)
- E. C. Foshee (1970–1974)
- Alton Turner (1966–1970)
- E. O. Eddins (1950–1966)
