= Miles Law School =

Law School in Birmingham, Alabama, U.S.

- Established: August 26, 1974
- Dean: J. Richet Pearson
- Location: Birmingham, Alabama, U.S. 33°28′53.13″N 86°54′31.9″W
- Bar pass rate: 0% (0 of 33, July 2026)
- Website: www.mlaw.edu

Miles Law School is a law school located in Birmingham, Alabama. It is independent of Miles College.

Miles Law School was founded on August 26, 1974. Among the founders were Bishop C. A. Kirkendoll of the C.M.E. Church, Dr. W. Clyde Williams, former president of Miles College, former Alabama Judge and state Senator J. Richmond Pearson, and Morris Dees, founder of the Southern Poverty Law Center.

== Program of Study ==
The school offers a four-year part-time evening program. Graduates of the law school receive the Juris Doctor. Of the 27 Miles alumni who took the Alabama bar exam in July 2026, none passed.

Miles Law School - Alabama Bar Passage Rates
	July 2016	Feb 2017	July 2017	Feb 2018	July 2018	Feb 2019	July 2019	Feb 2020	July 2026
First Time Takers	6	4	3	1	4	7	5	8	4
Passed	1	0	0	0	0	0	1	0	0
% Pass	16.7%	---	---	---	---	---	20.0%	---	---
Repeaters	18	14	18	16	17	18	23	23	29
Passed	1	3	2	2	0	0	1	0	0
% Pass	5.6%	21.4%	11.1%	12.5%	---	---	4.3%	---	---
Total Takers	24	18	21	17	21	25	28	31	33
Passed	2	3	2	2	---	---	2	0	0
% Pass	8.3%	16.7%	9.5%	11.8%	---	---	7.1%	---	---

== Accreditation ==
Miles Law School is not accredited by the American Bar Association. It is one of two unaccredited law schools in Alabama, the other being the Birmingham School of Law. Miles Law graduates are however eligible to take the Alabama Bar Exam pursuant to the authority granted by the Alabama Legislature and the Alabama Supreme Court.

== Notable alumni ==
- William A. Bell, Former Mayor of Birmingham
- Danny Carr, District attorney of Jefferson County, Alabama
- George T. French, Former Miles College President
- Juandalynn Givan, Alabama State Representative
- Lynneice Washington, District Attorney, Bessemer (AL) Division
- Bobby Singleton, Alabama State Senator
- Carole Smitherman, former mayor of Birmingham, current Circuit Court Judge
- Rodger Smitherman, Alabama State Senator
- Ontario Tillman, member of the Alabama House of Representatives
