= Rodger Smitherman =

American politician (born 1953)

Member of the Alabama Senate from the 18th district
- Incumbent
- Assumed office November 8, 1994
- Preceded by: Fred Horn

President pro tempore of the Alabama Senate
- In office February 5, 2009 – November 3, 2010
- Preceded by: Hinton Mitchem
- Succeeded by: Del Marsh

Personal details
- Born: Rodger Mell Smitherman; March 2, 1953 (age 73) Montgomery, Alabama, U.S.
- Party: Democratic
- Spouse: Carole Smitherman
- Children: 4 Crystal Smitherman
- Education: University of Montevallo and Miles Law School
- Profession: Lawyer

Rodger Mell Smitherman (born March 2, 1953) is a Democratic member of the Alabama Senate, representing the 18th District since 1994. He is also a member of the Alabama Sentencing Commission. Smitherman was elected President Pro Tempore of the Alabama Senate on February 5, 2009. He is a graduate of the University of Montevallo and Miles Law School.

== Biography ==
Smitherman graduated from the University of Montevallo with a B.B.A. degree and then from Miles Law School with a Juris Doctor which he earned with honors.

He was President Pro Tempore of the Alabama Senate from February, 2009, and served until November, 2010.

Smitherman's wife is current judge, former Birmingham City Councilor, and former Birmingham Mayor Carole Smitherman. They are the parents of four children. The Smithermans maintain a law practice in downtown Birmingham.

Smitherman is an Elder at his church.

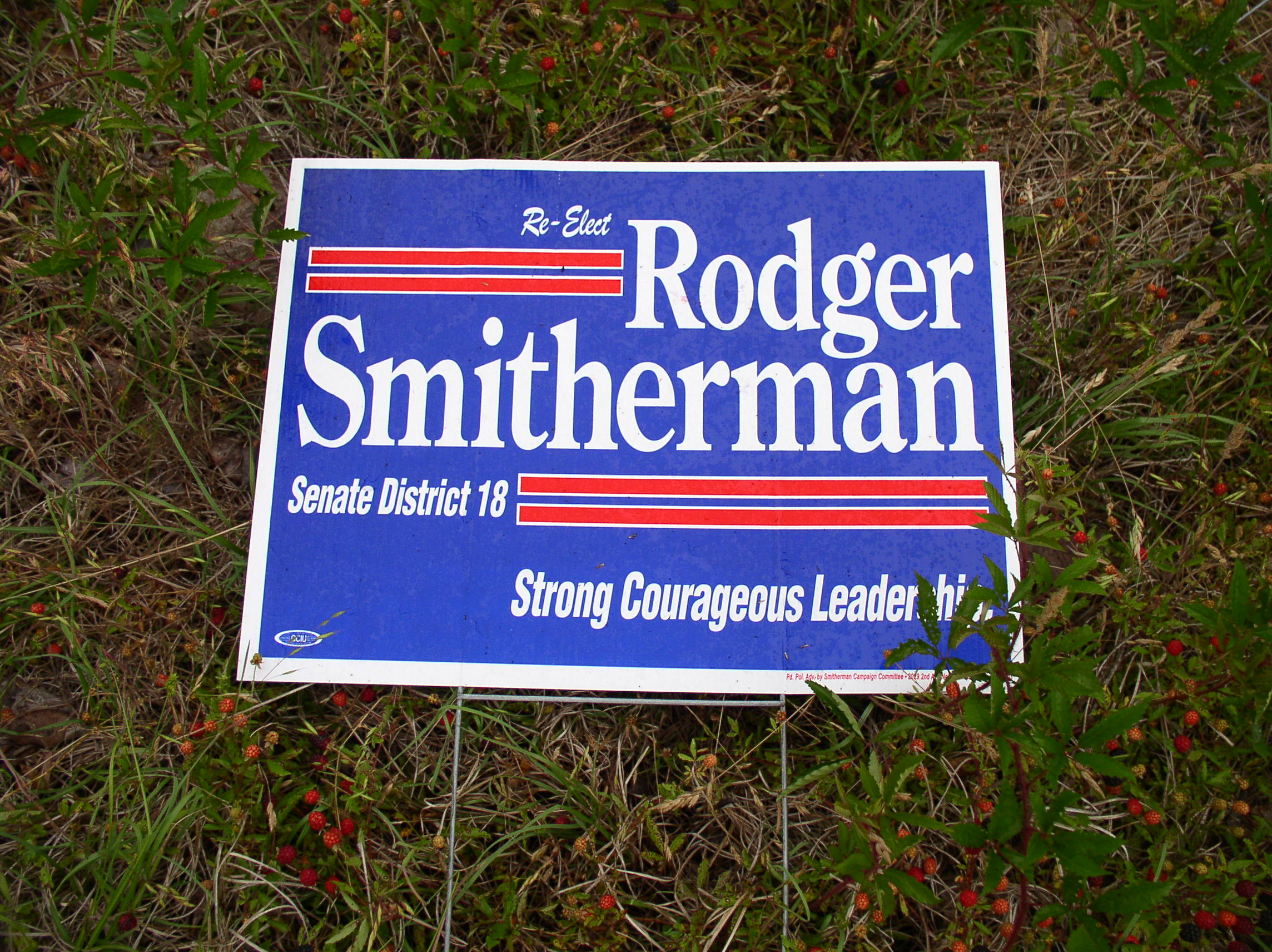
Rodger Smitherman for Alabama Senate (Jefferson County)
