= P.D. Jackson-Olin High School =

Coordinates: 33.51970°N 86.89097°W

P. D. Jackson-Olin High School

Location
- 1300 Avenue F Ensley; Birmingham, Alabama 35218; United States

Information
- School type: Public high school
- Founded: 1952 (74 years ago)
- School district: Birmingham City Schools
- CEEB code: 010435
- Principal: Nichole Davis Williams
- Teaching staff: 42.40 (FTE)
- Grades: 9–12
- Enrollment: 758 (2023–2024)
- Student to teacher ratio: 17.88
- Colors: Kelly green and gold
- Athletics: AHSAA Class 6A
- Team name: Mustangs
- Newspaper: The Mustang Pride
- Feeder schools: Bush Hills Academy Bush K-8; Green Acres Middle School; Wilkerson Middle School Wylam K-8
- Website: www.bhamcityschools.org/o/johs

P.D. Jackson-Olin High School (J-O) is a four-year public high school in Birmingham, Alabama. It is one of seven high schools in the Birmingham City School System. Founded in 1952 as Western High School, it was renamed Western-Olin High the following year in honor of the F.W. Olin Foundation, a grantor of $600,000 grant for the school's vocational building. It was renamed again in 1973, Western-Olin to P.D. Jackson-Olin High in honor of its founding principal, Dr. Pierre D. Jackson, who retired the same year after 21 years as principal. It was segregated. The school in its current form took shape in 2006 when J-O merged with Ensley High School as part of systemwide school consolidation. School colors are kelly green and gold, and the athletic teams are called the mustangs. J-O competes in AHSAA Class 6A athletics. In 2022 it had 822 students, about 91.5 percent African American, 6.5 percent Hispanic, and .7 percent White. Most students are economically disadvantaged and test scores are a fraction of the state average.

== Student Profile ==
Enrollment in grades 9–12 for the 2013–14 school year is 1,073 students. Approximately 98% of students are African-American, 1% are Hispanic, and 1% are multiracial. Roughly 91% of students qualify for free or reduced price lunch.

J-O has a graduation rate of 47%. Approximately 73% of its students meet or exceed proficiency standards in both reading and mathematics. The average ACT score for J-O students is 19.

== Campus ==
In fall 2006, Jackson-Olin moved to a new $30.8 million 300,000-square-foot (28,000 m^{2}) building and merged its student body with the former Ensley High School. The new school has a capacity of 1,800 students in 90 classrooms on 2 floors. There is a 450-seat cafeteria, 1,800-seat gymnasium, 750-seat auditorium, a practice gym and a football stadium at the new campus. A career wing houses classrooms for auto repair, welding, and culinary arts as well as science labs. Goodwyn Mills and Cawood were the architects for the new building, and Doster Construction was the general contractor.

== Athletics ==
J-O competes in AHSAA Class 6A athletics and fields teams in the following sports:

- Baseball
- Basketball (boys and girls)
- Cheerleading
- Football
- Indoor Track & Field (boys and girls)
- Outdoor Track & Field (boys and girls)
- Soccer
- Softball
- Volleyball

J-O won the 1989 AHSAA state championship in girls' outdoor track and field.

== Notable alumni ==
=== Western Olin High School ===
- Earl Hilliard Sr., politician
- Bernard Kincaid, former two-term mayor of Birmingham
- Eddie Kendricks, Motown singer

=== P.D. Jackson-Olin High School ===
- Mike Anderson, head basketball coach for the University of Arkansas
- Vonetta Flowers, gold medalist bobsledder at the 2002 Winter Olympics
- Reggie King, former basketball player for the University of Alabama, Kansas City Kings, and Seattle SuperSonics
- T. D. Moultry, professional football defensive end who is a free agent.
- David Palmer, former running back for the University of Alabama and Minnesota Vikings
- Que Robinson, professional football linebacker for the Denver Broncos
- Christopher Slap Davis, Actor for the MGM Studios
