= Que Robinson =

American football player (born 2001)

- Robinson with the Denver Broncos in 2026

No. 51 – Denver Broncos
- Position: Outside linebacker
- Roster status: Active

Personal information
- Born: May 12, 2001 (age 25); Birmingham, Alabama, U.S.
- Listed height: 6 ft 4 in (1.93 m)
- Listed weight: 243 lb (110 kg)

Career information
- High school: Jackson-Olin (Birmingham, Alabama)
- College: Alabama (2020–2024)
- NFL draft: 2025: 4th round, 134th overall pick

Career history
- Denver Broncos (2025–present)

Awards and highlights
- CFP national champion (2020)

Career NFL statistics as of Week 2, 2026
- Tackles: 19
- Sacks: 1.5
- Pass deflections: 1
- Stats at Pro Football Reference

Quandarrius "Que" Robinson (/kjuː/ kyoo; born May 12, 2001) is an American professional football outside linebacker for the Denver Broncos of the National Football League (NFL). He played college football for the Alabama Crimson Tide and was selected by the Broncos in the fourth round of the 2025 NFL draft.

== Early life ==
Robinson was born on May 12, 2001 in Birmingham, Alabama. Robinson grew up in the Ensley neighborhood of Birmingham, and attended P.D. Jackson-Olin High School. As a junior in 2018, he had 40 tackles and eight sacks. He missed most of his senior season in 2019 due to a torn ligament in his ankle. A four-star recruit, Robinson was selected to play in the 2020 All-American Bowl. He committed to the University of Alabama to play college football.

== College career ==
Robinson played at Alabama from 2020 to 2024. He was a backup and played mostly special teams until his senior year in 2024. Robinson's senior year ended after nine games after suffering an injury to his elbow. At the time of the injury, he was leading the team with four sacks and had 23 tackles. Robinson declared for the 2025 NFL draft after the season. For his career, he had 54 tackles and six sacks.

== Professional career ==
Pre-draft measurables
Height	Weight	Arm length	Hand span	Wingspan
6 ft 4 1/4 in (1.94 m)	243 lb (110 kg)	33 1/2 in (0.85 m)	9 5/8 in (0.24 m)	6 ft 8 1/8 in (2.04 m)
All values from NFL Combine

Robinson was drafted by the Denver Broncos in the fourth round (134th overall) of the 2025 NFL draft. He made his NFL debut in Week 6 against the New York Jets following an injury to Jonah Elliss.

== Personal life ==
Shortly before the beginning of his senior year at Alabama, Robinson lost his father to suicide. Robinson has a daughter, Riley.
