= Sundra Escott-Russell =

American politician (born 1954)

Member of the Alabama Senate from the 20th district
- In office March 10, 1993 – November 8, 2006
- Preceded by: Earl Hilliard Sr.
- Succeeded by: Linda Coleman-Madison

Member of the Alabama House of Representatives from the 60th district
- In office November 9, 1983 – November 7, 1990
- Preceded by: John S. Casey
- Succeeded by: Herself
- In office January 9, 1991 – March 10, 1993
- Preceded by: Herself
- Succeeded by: John Hilliard

Member of the Alabama House of Representatives from the 45th district
- In office January 28, 1981 – November 9, 1983
- Preceded by: Earl Hilliard Sr.
- Succeeded by: John S. Casey

Personal details
- Born: February 21, 1954 (age 72) Birmingham, Alabama
- Party: Democratic
- Children: 1
- Education: Alabama State University (B.S.)
- Occupation: Mortgage loan consultant

Sundra E. Escott-Russell (born February 21, 1954) is a Democratic politician from Alabama who served as a member of the Alabama Senate from the 20th district from 1993 to 2006 and as a member of the Alabama House of Representatives from 1981 to 1993.

== Early life ==
Escott-Russell was born in Birmingham, Alabama, in 1954, and graduated from Alabama State University. She was an intern in the office of Governor Fob James in 1979, and worked for Star Development, a real estate development firm afterwards.

== Alabama House of Representatives ==
In 1981, State Representative Earl Hilliard Sr. was elected to the Alabama Senate, and Escott-Russell ran in the special election to succeed him. She ran in a crowded Democratic primary that included Reverend William Hamilton; librarian Sweet Hollins; Ocie Pastard, an aide to Mayor Richard Arrington Jr.; and teacher Deforest Satisfied. In the general election, she defeated Libertarian candidate Timothy Gatewood in a landslide, winning 99 percent of the vote.

Escott-Russell ran for re-election in 1982, and was challenged by businessman Paul Johnson in the primary. She defeated Johnson by a wide margin, receiving 75 percent of the vote to his 25 percent, and had no opponents in the general election. In 1983, following court-ordered redistricting, a special legislative election was held with redrawn districts. Escott-Russell ran for re-election in the newly created 60th district, and was re-elected unopposed. Escott-Russell was re-elected without opposition in 1986.

In 1990, Escott-Russell faced no opponent, and was re-elected unopposed. However, after she filed a campaign finance form a day after the statutory deadline, Secretary of State Perry Hand refused to certify her as the winner of the election. Instead, a special election was held on January 8, 1991, which she won easily, defeating Republican nominee Raymond Kelley with 67 percent of the vote.

== Alabama Senate ==
State Senator Earl Hilliard Sr. was elected to the U.S. House of Representatives from the 7th congressional district in 1992, and he resigned from the state senate in 1993. Escott-Russell ran to succeed him, and won the Democratic primary in a landslide, defeating attorney Henry Thompson and former State Representative Jack Tucker with 72 percent of the vote. Escott-Russell then won the general election with 96 percent of the vote, becoming the first Black woman ever elected to the Alabama Senate. She was re-elected unopposed in 1994.

In 1998, Escott-Russell ran for re-election, and was challenged by Connie Goldsby, the director of an ecumenical services organization, in the Democratic primary. Goldsby was endorsed by the Jefferson County Progressive Democratic Council, a rival organization to the Jefferson County Citizens Coalition, which was the political vehicle for Birmingham Mayor Richard Arrington's allies. Escott-Russell won renomination in a landslide, defeating Goldsby with 85 percent of the vote. In the general election, she was challenged by Republican nominee Ken Hugh Bonham, a businessman. Escott-Russell defeated Bonham by a wide margin, winning re-election, 80–20 percent.

Escott-Russell ran for a fourth term in 2002. She faced a crowded field of opponents, including Emory Anthony, the attorney for Birmingham Mayor Bernard Kincaid; her sister, Dorothy Escott-Holmes; and Al Rutledge. She placed first in the primary, winning 47 percent of the vote, but advanced to a runoff election against Anthony, who narrowly placed second with 45 percent. Escott-Russell defeated Anthony by a narrow margin in the runoff, winning renomination 51–49 percent. She faced no opponent in the general election and won re-election.

In 2006, Escott-Russell was challenged by State Representative Linda Coleman-Madison and Rodney Huntley in the Democratic primary. Escott-Russell significantly outspent Coleman-Madison, but was ultimately defeated, winning 42 percent of the vote to Coleman-Madison's 53 percent.

== See also ==
- African Americans in Alabama
- List of first African-American U.S. state legislators
