= Alabama's 18th Senate district =

Alabama's 18th State Senate district
Senator
Rodger Smitherman; D–Birmingham
- Demographics: 35.9% White; 54.8% Black; 4.5% Hispanic; 2.6% Asian
- Population (2022): 140,969

Alabama's 18th Senate district is one of 35 districts in the Alabama Senate. The district has been represented by Rodger Smitherman since 1994.

== Geography ==
Election	Map	Counties in District
2026; 2022		Portion of Jefferson
2018		Portion of Jefferson
2014		Portion of Jefferson
2010; 2006; 2002		Portion of Jefferson

== Election history ==
=== Elections in the 2020s ===
Alabama Senate election, 2022: Senate District 18
Party	Candidate	Votes	%	±%
Democratic	Rodger Smitherman (Incumbent)	28,642	98.78	+0.43
Write-in		355	1.22	-0.43
Majority		28,287	97.55	+0.85
Turnout		28,997		
Democratic hold				

=== Elections in the 2010s ===
Alabama Senate election, 2018: Senate District 18
Party	Candidate	Votes	%	±%
Democratic	Rodger Smitherman (Incumbent)	39,819	98.35	+0.13
Write-in		668	1.65	-0.13
Majority		39,151	96.70	+0.27
Turnout		40,487		
Democratic hold				

Alabama Senate election, 2014: Senate District 18
Party	Candidate	Votes	%	±%
Democratic	Rodger Smitherman (Incumbent)	23,195	98.22	−0.10
Write-in		421	1.78	+0.10
Majority		22,774	96.43	−0.20
Turnout		23,616		
Democratic hold				

Alabama Senate election, 2010: Senate District 18
Party	Candidate	Votes	%	±%
Democratic	Rodger Smitherman (Incumbent)	25,154	98.32	+17.72
Write-in		431	1.68	+1.52
Majority		24,723	96.63	+35.26
Turnout		25,585		
Democratic hold				

=== Elections in the 2000s ===
Alabama Senate election, 2006: Senate District 18
Party	Candidate	Votes	%	±%
Democratic	Rodger Smitherman (Incumbent)	21,212	80.60	−17.95
Republican	Stanley Nance	5,063	19.24	+19.24
Write-in		41	0.16	-1.29
Majority		16,149	61.37	−35.74
Turnout		26,316		
Democratic hold				

Alabama Senate election, 2002: Senate District 18
Party	Candidate	Votes	%	±%
Democratic	Rodger Smitherman (Incumbent)	28,206	98.55	−0.69
Write-in		414	1.45	+0.69
Majority		27,792	97.11	−1.37
Turnout		28,620		
Democratic hold				

=== Elections in the 1990s ===
Alabama Senate election, 1998: Senate District 18
Party	Candidate	Votes	%	±%
Democratic	Rodger Smitherman (Incumbent)	25,226	99.24	+24.40
Write-in		193	0.76	+0.53
Majority		25,033	98.48	
Turnout		25,419		
Democratic hold				

Alabama Senate election, 1994: Senate District 18
Party	Candidate	Votes	%	±%
Democratic	Rodger Smitherman	19,958	74.84	−23.62
Patriot Party	Fred Horn (Incumbent)	6,649	24.93	+24.93
Write-in		62	0.23	-1.31
Majority		13,309	49.90	
Turnout		26,669		
Democratic hold				

Alabama Senate election, 1990: Senate District 18
Party	Candidate	Votes	%	±%
Democratic	Fred Horn (Incumbent)	21,959	98.46	+13.89
Write-in		343	1.54	+1.54
Majority		21,616	96.92	+27.78
Turnout		22,302		
Democratic hold				

Horn joined the Patriot Party in 1994 after failing to win the Democratic primary.

=== Elections in the 1980s ===
Alabama Senate election, 1986: Senate District 18
Party	Candidate	Votes	%	±%
Democratic	Fred Horn	26,104	84.57	−15.43
Republican	Erskine Brown	4,762	15.43	+15.43
Majority		21,342	69.14	−30.86
Turnout		30,866		
Democratic hold				

Alabama Senate election, 1983: Senate District 18
Party	Candidate	Votes	%	±%
Democratic	J. Richmond Pearson	4,314	100.00	
Majority		4,314	100.00	
Turnout		4,314		
Democratic hold				

Alabama Senate election, 1982: Senate District 18
Party	Candidate	Votes	%	±%
Democratic	Lister Hill Proctor (Incumbent)	19,399	100.00	
Majority		19,399	100.00	
Turnout		19,399		
Democratic hold				

== District officeholders ==
Senators take office at midnight on the day of their election.

- Rodger Smitherman (1994–present)
- Fred Horn (1986–1994)
- J. Richmond Pearson (1983–1986)
- Lister Hill Proctor (1978–1983)
- Obie J. Littleton (1974–1978)
- Pat Lindsey (1966–1974)
- H. P. James (1962–1966)
- Norman R. Crawford (1958–1962)
- H. P. James (1954–1958)
