= Claude Harris Jr. =

American politician

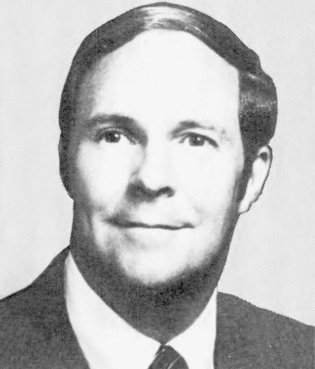

United States Attorney for the Northern District of Alabama
- In office October 4, 1993 – October 2, 1994
- President: Bill Clinton
- Preceded by: Jack Selden
- Succeeded by: Doug Jones

Member of the U.S. House of Representatives from Alabama's 7th district
- In office January 3, 1987 – January 3, 1993
- Preceded by: Richard Shelby
- Succeeded by: Earl Hilliard Sr.

Personal details
- Born: June 29, 1940 Bessemer, Alabama, U.S.
- Died: October 2, 1994 (aged 54) Birmingham, Alabama, U.S.
- Party: Democratic
- Spouse: Barbara
- Education: University of Alabama at Birmingham (BS); University of Alabama School of Law (JD)

Claude Harris Jr. (June 29, 1940 – October 2, 1994) was an American politician and attorney.

A Democrat from Alabama, he served in the United States House of Representatives from 1987 until 1993. He was succeeded in the House by Earl F. Hilliard.

== Biography ==
Born in Bessemer, Alabama, Harris earned his B.S. at the University of Alabama in 1962, graduated from University of Alabama Law School in 1965 and served in the Alabama Army National Guard. He was an assistant district attorney in Tuscaloosa County until 1977 when he took seat as a state circuit judge. He stepped down from the bench in 1985 to run for Congress to succeed Richard Shelby, who ran for the United States Senate. Harris was elected three times in 1986, 1988, and 1990. He declined to run for reelection in 1992 after the legislature reconfigured his district into a majority-minority district in compliance with provisions in the Voting Rights Act, having little chance of being elected in the new district.

Harris voted for the Abandoned Shipwrecks Act of 1987. The Act asserts United States title to certain abandoned shipwrecks located on or embedded in submerged lands under state jurisdiction, and transfers title to the respective state, thereby empowering states to manage these cultural and historical resources more efficiently, with the goal of preventing treasure hunters and salvagers from damaging them. President Ronald Reagan signed it into law on April 28, 1988.

After leaving Congress, Harris was appointed United States Attorney for the Northern District of Alabama under the new Clinton administration in 1993. Harris died of lung cancer on October 2, 1994, in Birmingham, Alabama.

He was married to Barbara Harris; they had two sons.

U.S. House of Representatives
Preceded by Richard Shelby	Member of the U.S. House of Representatives from Alabama's 7th congressional district 1987–1993	Succeeded by Earl F. Hilliard
