= Fred Horn =

American politician (1925–2018)

Member of the Alabama Senate from the 18th district
- In office November 4, 1986 – November 9, 1994
- Preceded by: J. Richmond Pearson
- Succeeded by: Rodger Smitherman

Member of the Alabama House of Representatives from the 53rd district
- In office November 9, 1983 – November 5, 1986
- Preceded by: Curtis Smith
- Succeeded by: Demetrius Newton

Member of the Alabama House of Representatives from the 39th district
- In office November 8, 1978 – November 9, 1983
- Preceded by: John T. Porter
- Succeeded by: Richard Lindsey

Personal details
- Born: June 26, 1925
- Died: December 7, 2018 (aged 93) Birmingham, Alabama
- Party: Democratic

Fred Horn (June 26, 1925 – December 7, 2018) was an American politician who served in the Alabama House of Representatives from 1978 to 1986 and in the Alabama Senate from the 18th district from 1986 to 1994.

He died on December 7, 2018, in Birmingham, Alabama at age 93.
