= William B. Blount =

American investment banker

William B. "Bill" Blount (born 1953) is an investment banker, bond underwriter, and former Alabama Democratic Party chairman. In 2009, he pled guilty to federal bribery and conspiracy charges in exchange for testimony against former Birmingham, Alabama, mayor Larry Langford. He was represented by former Alabama Lieutenant Governor and Attorney General Bill Baxley Blount received a full pardon on January 24, 2017 from the Alabama Pardons and Paroles Board.

== Education ==
Blount is a 1975 graduate of the University of Alabama, where he served as President of the Student Government Association (SGA). He graduated from the University of Alabama School of Law in 1978 and did graduate work in the United Kingdom.

During his time at the University, he was a member of Theta Nu Epsilon, also known as "The Machine," which was a now banned secret fraternity that engaged in social pressure, violence and coercion to control student body elections at the University of Alabama.

== Career ==
Blount was a partner with a large regional investment banking firm in Montgomery for six years before creating and co-owning the firm Blount Parrish & Co. in 1985. While in the investment banking business, he completed hundreds of tax-exempt and taxable financings for public utilities, hospitals, corporations, cities, counties, school boards and other entities. Blount also founded or co-founded several other companies involved in solid waste handling, communications, publishing and manufacturing.

Blount was also the chairman of the Alabama Democratic Party from 1991 to 1995.

== 2008 Federal Charges ==
In December 2007, Blount and Mayor Langford were subpoenaed to a U. S. District Court in Miami, Florida to testify. Both refused. On December 1, 2008, Blount and Langford were given a 101 count indictment including charges of creating "pay to play" schemes in which they personally profited from Jefferson County's sewer bond deals.

The indictment charged that between 2003 and 2006, former Birmingham mayor Larry Langford received payments totaling $235,000 from Blount. Prosecutors also alleged that Blount bought Langford expensive gifts such as Tourneau and Rolex watches totaling about $22,000 and luxury clothing during trips to New York City, where the commissioners discussed bond deals with Wall Street. On August 18, 2009, Blount pled guilty to one count of conspiracy and one count of bribery and agreed to forfeit $1 million. Blount was sentenced to federal prison on February 26, 2010 for 4 years and 4 months. He served 29 months and was released to federal probation in October 2012.

On January 24 of 2017, Blount was granted a full pardon by the State of Alabama Pardons and Paroles Board.
