= T. D. Moultry =

American gridiron football player (born 1998)

No. 97
- Position: Defensive end

Personal information
- Born: January 1, 1998 (age 28); Birmingham, Alabama, U.S.
- Listed height: 6 ft 2 in (1.88 m)
- Listed weight: 253 lb (115 kg)

Career information
- High school: Jackson-Olin (Birmingham)
- College: Auburn (2017–2021)
- NFL draft: 2022: undrafted

Career history
- 2022: Pittsburgh Steelers*
- 2023: Montreal Alouettes
- * Offseason or practice squad member only

Awards and highlights
- Grey Cup champion (2023)
- Stats at CFL.ca

Tadarian "T. D." Moultry (born January 1, 1998) is an American former professional football defensive end who played for the Montreal Alouettes of the Canadian Football League (CFL). He played college football at Auburn. He was also a member of the Pittsburgh Steelers.

== Early life ==
Moultry played high school football at P.D. Jackson-Olin High School in Birmingham, Alabama as a linebacker. He played in the 2017 U.S. Army All-American Bowl. He also played basketball in high school.

== College career ==
Moultry played college football at Auburn from 2017 to 2021 as a defensive lineman and linebacker. He appeared in a school record 59 games. He was invited to the 2022 NFLPA Collegiate Bowl.

== Professional career ==
Moultry signed with the Pittsburgh Steelers of the National Football League (NFL) on May 4, 2022, after going undrafted in the 2022 NFL draft. He was waived/injured on August 8 and placed on injured reserve on August 9. He was waived from injured reserve on August 17, 2022.

Moultry was signed to the practice roster of the Montreal Alouettes of the Canadian Football League (CFL) on September 11, 2023. He moved between the practice roster and active roster several times during the 2023 season before being placed on injured reserve on November 3, 2023. He dressed in two games for the Alouettes in 2023, but did not record any statistics. On November 19, 2023, the Alouettes won the 110th Grey Cup, defeating the Winnipeg Blue Bombers by a score of 28–24. Moultry was released on June 2, 2024.
