= Linda Coleman-Madison =

American politician

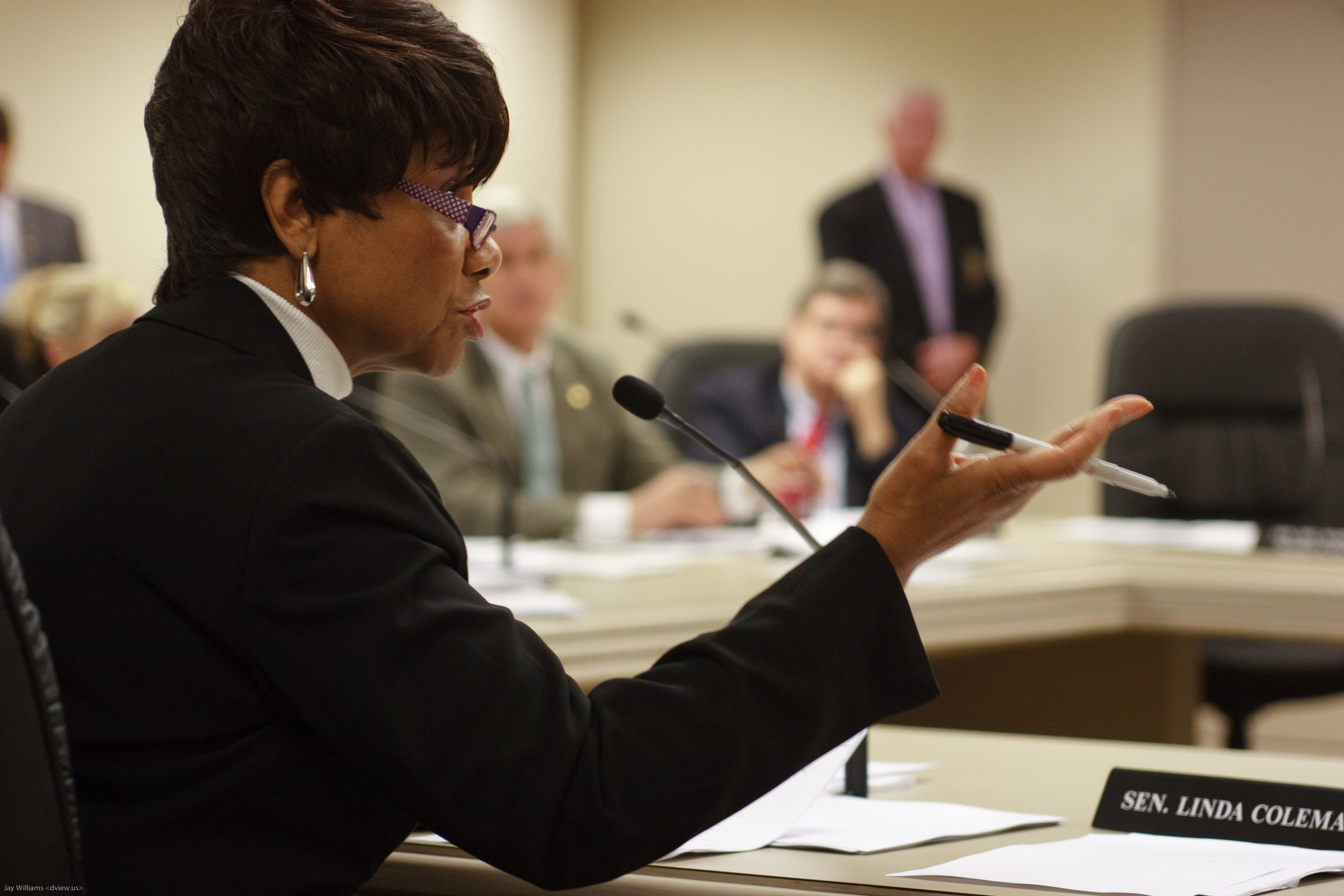
- Coleman-Madison in 2012

Member of the Alabama Senate from the 20th district
- Incumbent
- Assumed office November 7, 2006
- Preceded by: Sundra Escott

Member of the Alabama House of Representatives from the 60th district
- In office November 6, 2002 – November 7, 2006
- Preceded by: John Hilliard
- Succeeded by: Earl Hilliard Jr.

Personal details
- Born: Birmingham, Alabama, U.S.
- Party: Democratic
- Profession: Educator, marketer, realtor

Linda Foster Coleman-Madison is an American politician serving as a Democratic member of the Alabama Senate, representing the 20th District since 2006. Previously she was a member of the Alabama House of Representatives from 2003 through 2006.

== Early life and education ==
Coleman-Madison was born in Birmingham, Alabama. She graduated from Westfield High School, in her home town. She received an M.A. from University of Alabama at Birmingham, as well as a B.S. from Alabama A&M University. She also attended Birmingham Southern College.

== Career ==
Prior to her state service, Coleman-Madison worked in marketing. In addition, she also has worked as a realtor, a teacher, a recruitment specialist and a compliance administrator. She has served in the Alabama Senate since 2006 as a Democrat. She previously served in the Alabama House of Representatives from 2003 until 2006. Prior, she served on the Birmingham City Council. In December, 2018, she served as the Minority Caucus Vice Chair.

Coleman-Madison is a proponent of abortion rights. She voted against the states abortion law, which essentially outlaws all abortions, with no exceptions for pregnancy which results from rape or incest. She proposed an amendment to the Alabama Constitution which would require the state to provide free prenatal and medical care for mothers who had been denied an abortion by the law, although her amendment was not passed.

== Personal life ==
Coleman-Madison is Catholic.

== External links and references ==
- Alabama State Legislature – Senator Linda Coleman official government website
- Project Vote Smart – Senator Linda Coleman (AL) profile
- Political profile at Bama Politics
- Follow the Money – Linda Coleman
  - 2006 2002 1998 campaign contributions

Specific
