= 1999 Denver mayoral election =

Election for the mayor of Denver, Colorado

- May 4, 1999
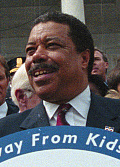

Candidate	Wellington Webb	Gill Ford
Party	Nonpartisan	Nonpartisan
Popular vote	39,707	3,684
Percentage	80.77%	7.49%
Candidate	Richard Grimes	Stephannie Huey
Party	Nonpartisan	Nonpartisan
Popular vote	2,907	2,660
Percentage	5.91%	5.41%
Mayor before election
Wellington Webb
Nonpartisan
Elected mayor
Wellington Webb
Nonpartisan

The 1999 Denver mayoral election took place on May 4, 1999. Incumbent Mayor Wellington Webb ran for re-election to a third term. Unlike Webb's 1991 and 1995 campaigns, he faced little-known competitors, including minister Gill Ford, cosmetologist Richard Grimes, and mortgage broker Stephannie Huey.

Webb ultimately won the election in a landslide, winning 81 percent of the vote and avoiding the need for a runoff election.

== General election ==
=== Candidates ===
- Wellington Webb, incumbent Mayor
- Gill Ford, minister and activist
- Richard Grimes, cosmetologist
- Stephannie Huey, mortgage broker

=== Results ===
1999 Denver mayoral election results
Party	Candidate	Votes	%
Nonpartisan	Wellington Webb	39,707	80.77%
Nonpartisan	Gill L. Ford	3,684	7.49%
Nonpartisan	Richard O. Grimes	2,907	5.91%
Nonpartisan	Stephannie S. Huey	2,660	5.41%
Nonpartisan	Write-ins	200	0.41%
Total votes		49,158	100.00%
