= Juandalynn Givan =

American politician

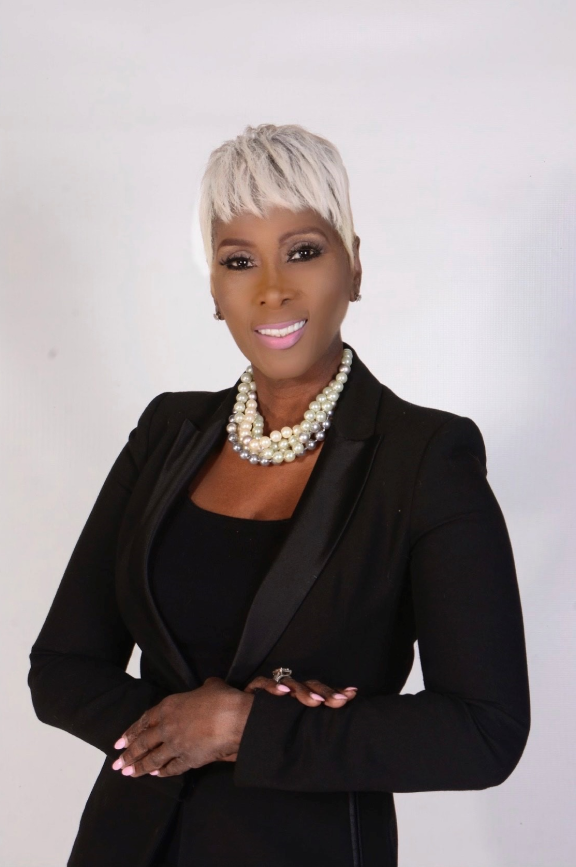

Member of the Alabama House of Representatives from the 60th district
- Incumbent
- Assumed office November 3, 2010
- Preceded by: Earl Hilliard Jr.

Personal details
- Born: Juandalynn Deleathia Givan; 1970 or 1971 (age 55–56) Birmingham, Alabama, U.S.
- Party: Democratic
- Education: Miles College (BA); Miles Law School (JD)
- Website: Campaign website

Juandalynn Deleathia "Lee Lee" Givan (born 1970/1971) is an American attorney, business owner, and Democratic politician who has served in the Alabama House of Representatives since 2010, representing District 60, which includes parts of Jefferson County, Alabama. In January 2025, she announced her candidacy for Mayor of Birmingham.

== Early life and education ==
Givan was born and raised in Birmingham, Alabama, to Leroy and Patricia Givan. She earned a Bachelor of Arts in Political Science from Miles College in 1992 and a Juris Doctor from Miles Law School in 1996. She worked for Birmingham’s Mayor Richard Arrington Jr., focusing on capital projects and development, and later served as a HOPE VI coordinator with the Housing Authority of the Birmingham District.

== Legal and professional career ==
In 2004, Givan founded Givan & Associates, a law firm offering services in governmental relations, business disputes, estate planning, and program management consulting. She also leads That Girl Inc., an organization focused on public speaking and mentorship.

== Political career ==
=== Alabama House of Representatives ===
Givan was elected to the Alabama House of Representatives in 2010 and has been re-elected in subsequent elections. She has served on the Constitution, Campaigns and Elections Committee, the Fiscal Responsibility Committee, and the Jefferson County Legislation Committee.

Her legislative work has included bills addressing postpartum depression education, municipal firearm regulations, and administrative filing fees for expungements.

In 2017, Givan highlighted racial disparities during a debate on marijuana possession laws, an exchange that drew broader media attention. She has also supported calls for investigations into policing practices in Brookside, Alabama.

=== 2024 Congressional campaign ===
In November 2023, Givan announced her candidacy for Alabama’s 2nd congressional district. Her campaign emphasized public safety, economic development, and racial equity. She was not successful in the 2024 Democratic primary.

== 2025 Mayoral campaign ==
In January 2025, Givan announced her candidacy for Mayor of Birmingham. Her platform includes initiatives focusing on neighborhood improvements, infrastructure repairs, and public safety programs. One proposal, "Operation 122," sets a goal of addressing cleaning and maintenance issues across Birmingham's neighborhoods within 122 days of taking office. Other initiatives target roadway repairs, efforts to reduce homelessness through housing programs, and expansion of youth services and job training partnerships. After the assassination of Charlie Kirk, Givan called for legislation to expand the state's death penalty to include politically motivated attacks.

== Awards and recognitions ==
Givan has received several awards for her public service. These include Freshman Legislator of the Year (2010), Legislator of the Year by the Alabama Hospitality Association (2017), and National Legislator of the Year from the National Black Caucus of State Legislators (2015). She was also recognized by the NAACP in 2010. In 2021, she was selected as a fellow by E Pluribus Unum for her work on racial and economic equity issues.

== Affiliations ==
Givan is affiliated with several civic organizations, including Alpha Kappa Alpha, The Links, Inc., the NAACP, and the Museum of Urban Arts. She has also served with the United Negro College Fund.
