= Earl Hilliard Sr. =

American politician (born 1942)

Earl Hilliard
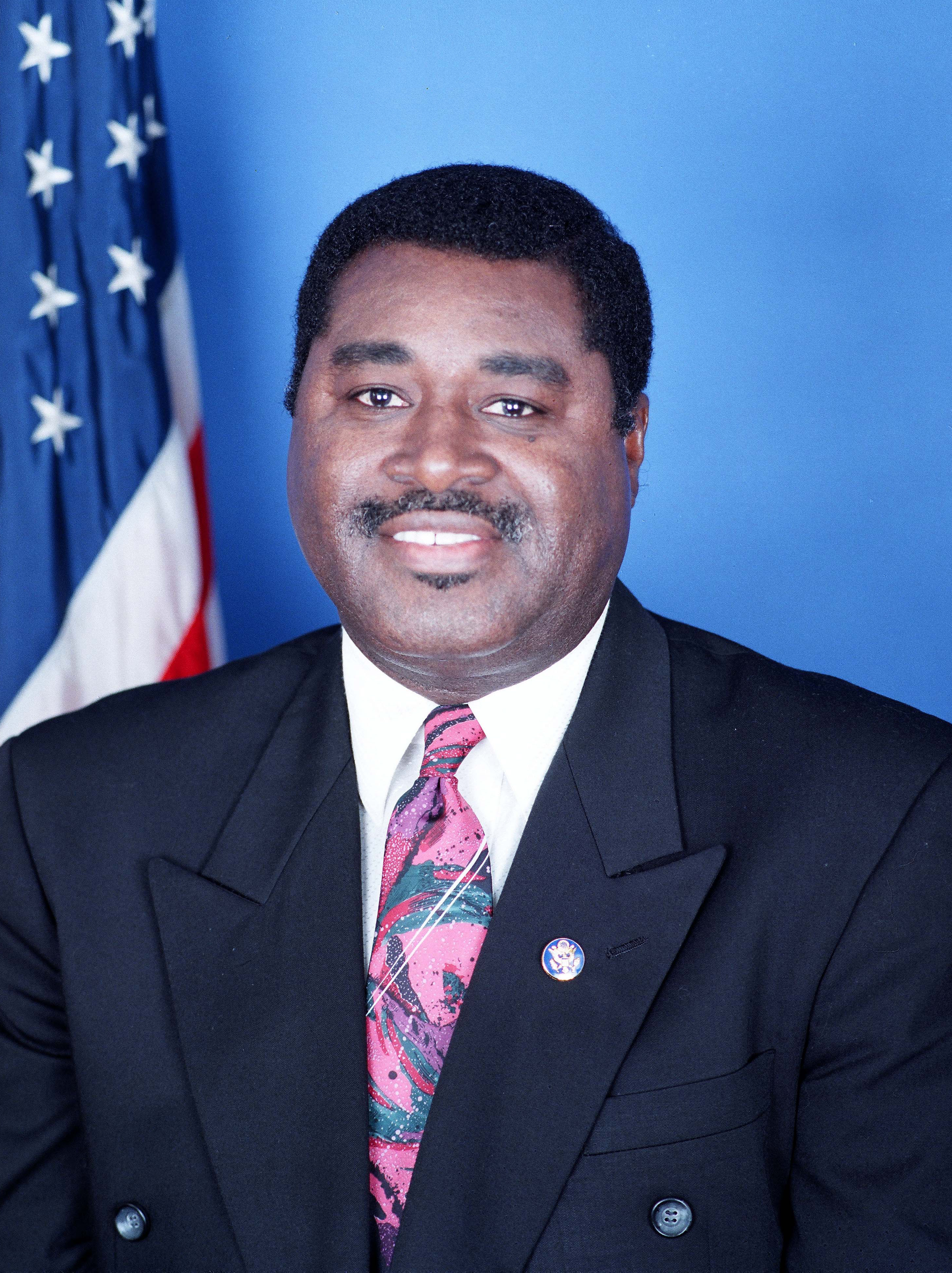

Member of the U.S. House of Representatives from Alabama's 7th district
- In office January 3, 1993 – January 3, 2003
- Preceded by: Claude Harris Jr.
- Succeeded by: Artur Davis

Member of the Alabama Senate
- In office September 3, 1980 – January 3, 1993
- Preceded by: U. W. Clemon
- Succeeded by: Sundra Escott
- Constituency: 15th district (1980–1983); 20th district (1983–1993)

Member of the Alabama House of Representatives from the 45th district
- In office November 6, 1974 – September 3, 1980
- Preceded by: Constituency established
- Succeeded by: Sundra Escott

Personal details
- Born: Earl Frederick Hilliard; April 9, 1942 (age 84) Birmingham, Alabama, U.S.
- Party: Democratic
- Children: Earl Hilliard Jr.
- Relatives: John Hilliard (nephew)
- Education: Morehouse College (BA); Howard University (JD); Clark Atlanta University (MBA)

Earl Frederick Hilliard (born April 9, 1942) is an American politician from the U.S. state of Alabama who served as the U.S. representative for the state's 7th district. He served in the Alabama House of Representatives and the Alabama Senate. His son Earl Hilliard Jr. is also a politician.

== Early life ==
Hilliard was born in Birmingham, Alabama, and graduated from Morehouse College.

== Career ==
He was elected as a Democrat to the Alabama House of Representatives in 1974, serving until his election to the Alabama Senate in 1980. He served in the upper house until his election to Congress.

Hilliard was elected to the United States House of Representatives in 1992 from the 7th District, a 65 percent black-majority district stretching from Birmingham to Montgomery. In the process, he became the first Black person since Jeramiah Haralson in 1877 to represent Alabama in Congress. He also became the first Democrat to represent a significant portion of the capital since 1965.

He faced his first serious challenge from Artur Davis in the 2000 Democratic primary election—the real contest in this heavily Democratic district—but prevailed.

Davis challenged Hilliard again in 2002 in a district that had been changed significantly by redistricting. The 7th lost its share of Montgomery, and was pushed further into Birmingham, absorbing a large number of mostly white precincts in that city. The campaign that year was focused on Hilliard's record in office and alleged ethical issues, as well as race, the Israeli–Palestinian conflict, and terrorism. Hilliard claimed "the only thing" that Davis, also an African American, had done for African Americans was "put them in jail" during his time as a federal prosecutor.

In 2001, Hilliard voted against a bill funding increases in military support to Israel and opposing criminalization of Palestinian politicians. A third candidate also ran in the Democratic primary, and Hilliard finished with the most votes but failed to win a majority; under Alabama law, he then faced a rematch with second-place finisher Davis in a run-off election. Davis won the run-off with 54% of the vote.

Hilliard is a 1960 graduate of Western-Olin High School in Birmingham. He received a B.A. in 1964 from Morehouse College, a J.D. in 1967 from Howard University, and an M.B.A. in 1970 from Atlanta University.

He is a member of Alpha Phi Alpha fraternity. He is a member of the board of the Congressional Black Caucus Institute.

Hilliard's son, Earl Hilliard Jr., is a former member of the Alabama House of Representatives who ran unsuccessfully for Congress in 2010, also in the 7th district.

== See also ==
- List of African-American United States representatives

U.S. House of Representatives
| Preceded by Claude Harris Jr. | Member of the U.S. House of Representatives from Alabama's 7th congressional district 1993–2003 | Succeeded by Artur Davis |
U.S. order of precedence (ceremonial)
| Preceded by Ben Erdreich as Former U.S. Representative | Order of precedence of the United States as Former U.S. Representative | Succeeded by Jo Bonner as Former U.S. Representative |
