= 1995 Denver mayoral election =

- May 2, 1995 (primary); June 6, 1995 (runoff)
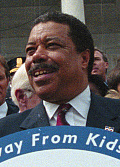

Candidate	Wellington Webb	Mary DeGroot
Party	Nonpartisan	Nonpartisan
First round	44,157; 42.72%	44,254; 42.81%
Runoff	66,904; 54.10%	56,755; 45.90%
Candidate	Bob Crider	John Frew
Party	Nonpartisan	Nonpartisan
First round	9,766; 9.45%	5,193; 5.02%
Runoff	Eliminated	Eliminated
Mayor before election
Wellington Webb
Nonpartisan
Elected mayor
Wellington Webb
Nonpartisan

The 1995 Denver mayoral election took place on took place on June 6, 1995, following a primary election on May 2, 1995. Incumbent Mayor Wellington Webb ran for re-election to a second term. He was challenged by City Councilwoman Mary DeGroot, City Auditor Bob Crider, and attorney John Frew.

Webb's administration supervised the construction of the Denver International Airport, but repeated delays in the airport's opening attracted criticism in the lead-up to the 1995 election. DeGroot emerged as Webb's main opponent, and attacked him for mismanaging the airport's construction and for patronage in his administration's hiring.

DeGroot emerged as Webb's main opponent, and attacked him for mismanaging the construction of the Denver International Airport, which opened more than a year behind schedule, and for patronage in his administration's hiring. In the primary election, DeGroot narrowly placed first over Webb, winning 42.8 percent of the vote to his 42.7 percent, despite polls showing her in second place.

In the runoff election, Webb defeated DeGroot by a wide margin, winning 54 percent of the vote to her 46 percent.

== Primary election ==
=== Candidates ===
- Mary DeGroot, City Councilwoman
- Wellington Webb, incumbent Mayor
- Bob Crider, City Auditor
- John Frew, attorney

=== Results ===
Primary election results
Party	Candidate	Votes	%
Nonpartisan	Mary DeGroot	44,254	42.81%
Nonpartisan	Wellington Webb	44,157	42.72%
Nonpartisan	Bob Crider	9,766	9.45%
Nonpartisan	John Frew	5,193	5.02%
Total votes		103,370	100.00%

== General election ==
=== Results ===
1995 Denver mayoral special election results
Party	Candidate	Votes	%
Nonpartisan	Wellington Webb (inc.)	66,904	54.10%
Nonpartisan	Mary DeGroot	56,755	45.90%
Total votes		123,659	100.00%
