= Alabama Sentencing Commission =

Agency of the U.S. state of Alabama

The Alabama Sentencing Commission was established to maintain an effective, fair, and efficient sentencing system for the state of Alabama. The 17-member commission is also charged with enhancing public safety, providing truth-in-sentencing and preventing unwarranted disparity in the sentencing of individuals convicted in the state's criminal justice system. Main offices for the commission are located in Montgomery, Alabama.

== History ==
The commission was established by statute in 2000 after a two-year study of sentencing policy in Alabama concluded that significant problems existed within the state's then-existing sentencing and corrections structure.

Prior to 2012 sentencing guidelines developed by the commission were voluntary. In 2012 Senator Cam Ward presented Senate Bill 386, which Governor Robert Bentley later signed into law. The law invested the commission with more power by making standards they developed for sentencing non-violent offenders presumptive.

While these sentencing reforms initially contributed to a drop in the statewide prison population, Alabama now has one of the highest incarceration rates in the United States. In 2020 the Department of Justice sued the Alabama Department of Corrections for multiple issues including overcrowding.
