= Carole Smitherman =

American politician and jurist

Circuit Court Judge of Alabama's Tenth Judicial Circuit
- In office January 15, 2013 – January 2025
- Succeeded by: Frederic Bolling
- Constituency: place 13

31st Mayor of Birmingham
- In office October 28, 2009 – November 24, 2009
- Preceded by: Larry Langford
- Succeeded by: Roderick Royal

President of the Birmingham City Council
- In office November 2005 – November 24, 2009
- Succeeded by: Roderick Royal

Member of the Birmingham City Council from the 6th district
- In office 2001 – January 15, 2013
- Preceded by: Pat Alexander
- Succeeded by: Sheila Tyson

Personal details
- Born: 1952 (age 73–74)
- Party: Democratic
- Spouse: Rodger Smitherman
- Children: 4 Crystal Smitherman
- Education: Spelman College; Miles College

Carole Catlin Smitherman (born 1952) is a retired American politician and jurist, serving as the Dean of Miles Law School. Smitherman served in 2009 as the 31st Mayor of Birmingham, Alabama and spent several years as a member of the City Council before resigning to assume her current judicial position.

== Biography ==
Smitherman grew up in Birmingham. She and her brother were raised by her grandmother, an instructor at Lawson State Community College. Smitherman often touts her childhood friendship with former United States Secretary of State Condoleezza Rice. She graduated from Spelman College in Atlanta, Georgia in 1973. She went on to earn her Juris Doctor at Miles Law School, graduating first in her class in 1979. Smitherman is married to Alabama State Senator Rodger Smitherman.

Carole Smitherman was first elected to the Birmingham City Council in 2001 and has been re-elected twice. She campaigned unsuccessfully for the mayor's office in 2003, 2007, and 2009.

As President of the Birmingham City Council, she assumed the office of mayor when Larry Langford was convicted of 60 counts of bribery and related charges on October 28, 2009. A month later, she then lost the position when the new council convened on November 24, 2009, and elected Roderick Royal as council president on a 5–4 vote, thus automatically making Royal the acting mayor. Smitherman later lost her election bid as mayor in a special election following Langford's conviction.

Carole Smitherman was Birmingham's first female and first African-American female mayor. She also was the first African-American woman hired as a deputy district attorney in Jefferson County and first African American female Municipal and Circuit Court Judge in Birmingham. Smitherman also served as a municipal prosecutor for the city of Irondale, Alabama. She was elected to her current judicial office in 2012, after beating attorney Pat Thetford. The seat handles civil matters and controversy over $10,000.

Smitherman was unopposed in her reelection in 2018, and she was elected to a second term.

Smitherman did not run for reelection in 2024. Democrat Frederic Bolling defeated Republican Douglas Roy for her open seat.

Preceded by Larry Langford	Mayor of Birmingham, Alabama; October 2009 - November 2009	Succeeded by Roderick Royal
