= Roderick Royal =

American politician

Roderick V. Royal (born October 4, 1965) is a former Birmingham City Councilman who served as the President of the Birmingham City Council.

Royal served for two months (November 2009-January 2010) as the 32nd Mayor of Birmingham, Alabama occupying the office in the absence of former mayor Larry Langford who was removed following a criminal conviction in a federal corruption case. Royal took over the post of acting mayor from Carole Smitherman when he was installed as Council president by the newly seated City Council on November 24, 2009. His tenure as Mayor ended when Mayor William A. Bell, took office on January 26, 2010.

Royal was born and raised in Birmingham and held elected office early in life, as student council president at Carrie A. Tuggle Elementary School. He went on to hold the same position at A. H. Parker High School. Royal then earned a bachelor's degree in political science at Tuskegee University and a master's in public administration at Webster University in Saint Louis, Missouri. He later completed a law enforcement program at the University of Alabama.

During the first implementation of Birmingham's Community Participation Program, Royal served as a youth member of the Fountain Heights Neighborhood Association. He later was elected secretary of the East Thomas Neighborhood Association, serving two terms.

Royal has been employed as a statewide coordinator for Job Corps, as an instructor at Miles College, as a police officer, and as an officer in the United States Army during Operation Desert Storm. Later he worked as a City Council assistant and served on several charitable boards.

Royal was first elected to the Birmingham City Council in 2001 and was re-elected in 2005 and 2009. Among the initiatives he has developed are the securing of bond funds to extend sewer service to underserved communities, a program to provide breakfast bars to elementary school students, and a campaign for public-sponsored in-school dental care.

Preceded by Carole Smitherman	Acting Mayor of Birmingham, Alabama; November 2009-January 2010	Succeeded by William A. Bell
