= Larry Langford =

American mayor (1948–2019)

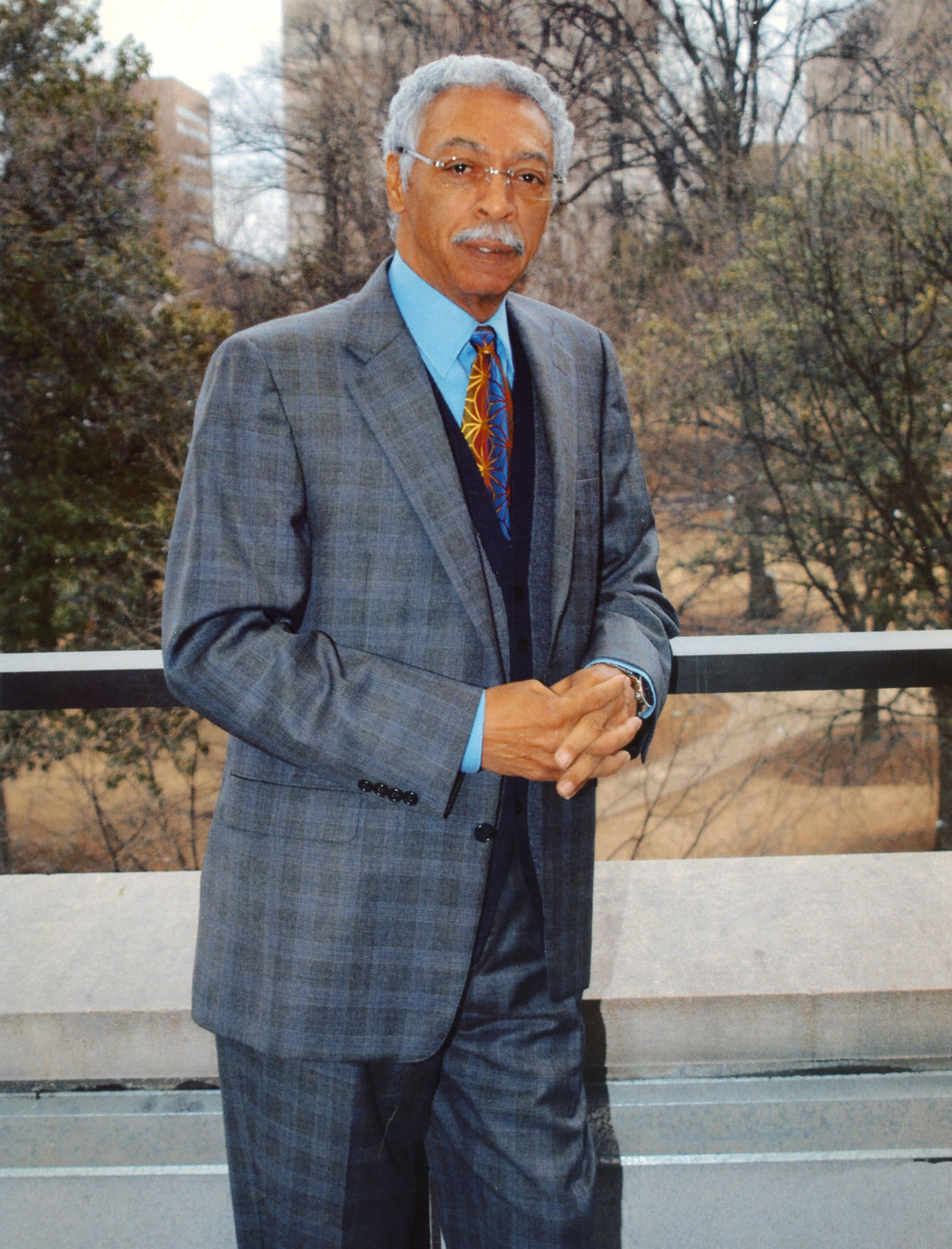

30th Mayor of Birmingham
- In office November 13, 2007 – October 28, 2009
- Preceded by: Bernard Kincaid
- Succeeded by: Carole Smitherman

Personal details
- Born: March 18, 1946 Birmingham, Alabama, U.S.
- Died: January 8, 2019 (aged 72) Birmingham, Alabama, U.S.
- Party: Democratic
- Spouse: Melva Langford
- Children: 1
- Education: University of Alabama at Birmingham

Military service
- Allegiance: United States
- Branch/service: United States Air Force
- Years of service: 1965-1970
- Battles/wars: Vietnam War

Larry Paul Langford (March 18, 1946 – January 8, 2019) was an American politician and convicted felon who had a one-term tenure as the mayor of the city of Birmingham, Alabama. At the time of his death, Langford was hospitalized on compassionate release from serving a 15-year federal prison sentence.

== Early life and education ==
Langford was born in Birmingham on March 18, 1946. He graduated from A. H. Parker High School before entering the United States Air Force. He graduated from the University of Alabama at Birmingham in 1972 with a Bachelor of Science degree in social and behavioral sciences.

== Early career ==
Langford was a reporter for WBRC-6, which at the time was the ABC affiliate in Birmingham, during the mid 1970s. He was the community's first African-American TV news reporter. He was later a public relations director for a Birmingham Budweiser distributor. Prior to entering politics, Langford was a well known local television personality.

== Political career ==
Langford, a Democrat, was elected to the county commission in 2002. His colleagues on the five-member commission elected Langford as commission president, the first African-American to hold the office.

He also served as mayor of Fairfield, Alabama, and served one term on the Birmingham City Council.

Langford raised money and generated public interest and support for Visionland Theme Park (now known as Alabama Splash Adventure), located in Bessemer. The park was built largely by bond issues backed by a consortium of municipalities in the western part of the county, as well as the city of Birmingham and the county government. The park later declared bankruptcy, and was sold to Southland Entertainment Group for just over $5 million at auction.

As Fairfield mayor, Langford spoke publicly many times about his plans to run for higher office, particularly Governor of Alabama. After the bankruptcy of Visionland, Langford's political fortunes seemed to wane, and his talk of higher office diminished. After losing the county commission presidency, Langford announced on June 5, 2007, that he would run for mayor of Alabama's largest city.

Langford stunned many when he emerged as a top contender in a field of 10 candidates that included incumbent mayor Bernard Kincaid. Preliminary results credited him with 26,277 of 52,111 votes cast in the election, meaning that he avoided a runoff with challenger Patrick Cooper by 170 votes. Cooper then challenged the election in court, saying that Langford was still a resident of Fairfield and did not legally reside within Birmingham's city limits. Cooper later withdrew his case after a judge declared Langford's downtown loft a legal residence.

While in office Langford was a member of the Mayors Against Illegal Guns Coalition, an anti-gun group with a stated goal of "making the public safer by getting illegal guns off the streets and that at the time was co-chaired by Boston Mayor Thomas Menino and New York City Mayor Michael Bloomberg.

Langford was long a proponent of a domed stadium for the city, intended to replace the aging Legion Field as a venue for football on the collegiate and professional levels. He previously promoted a tax hike to pay for the dome, which was soundly rejected by voters a decade earlier under then-Mayor Richard Arrington, although later analysis of votes showed an overwhelming support for the dome inside city limits. After taking office as Birmingham mayor, Langford vowed that a domed stadium would be built in the city no matter what.

== Controversy ==
=== Church and state ===
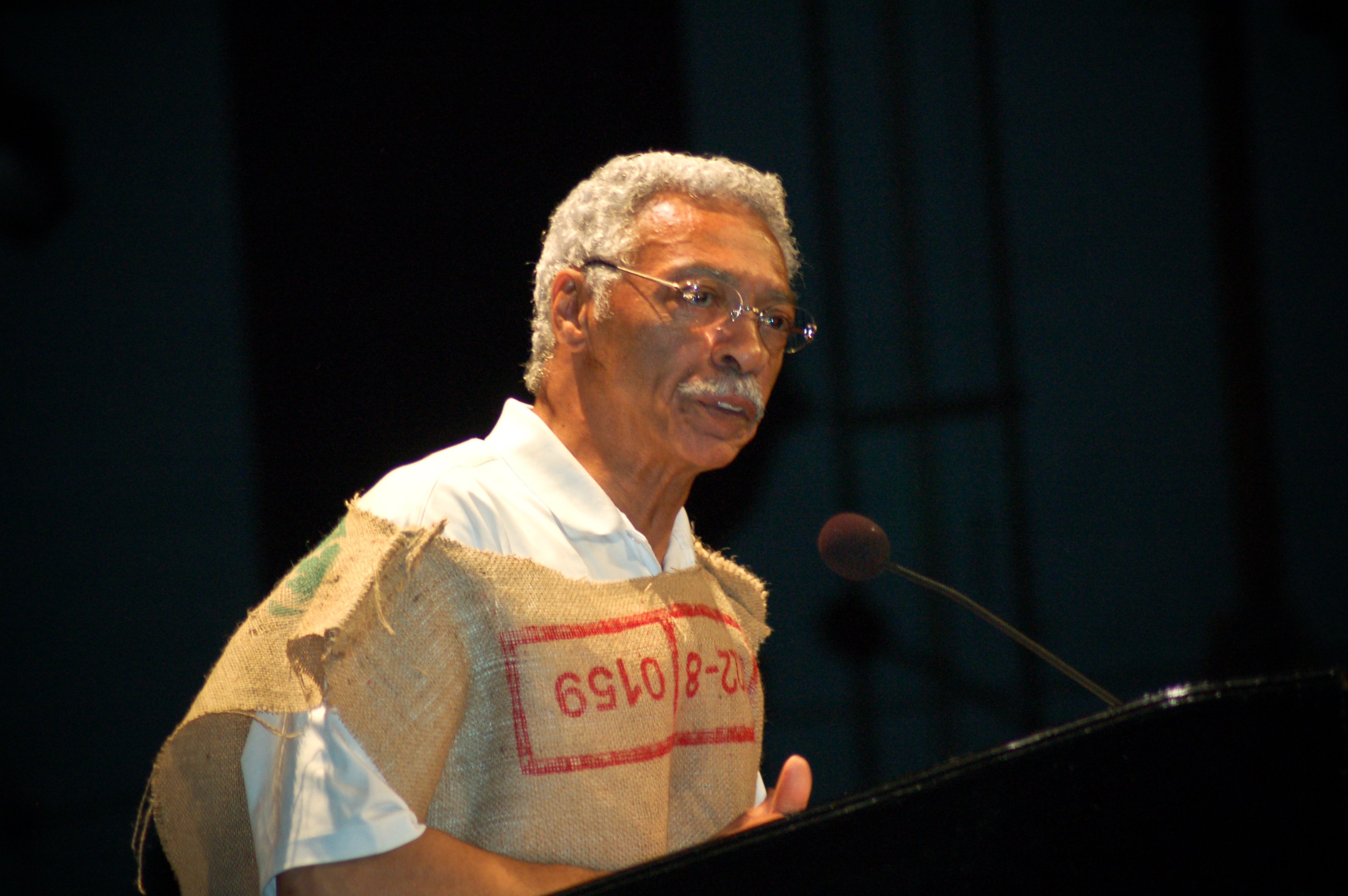
Langford, wearing a burlap sack, speaks to a crowd at Boutwell Auditorium on April 22, 2008

Langford, who converted to Catholicism in 1996, was both praised and criticized for the degree to which his Christian faith informed his political agenda. He held Bible studies for municipal workers at City Hall each week and was a frequent speaker at public prayer services and church events.

On April 22, 2008, Langford issued a proclamation on city letterhead proclaiming the following Friday to be "It's Time to Pray" in the City of Birmingham. He called upon "all Bishops, Priests, Pastors, Ministers and all of our citizens of various denominations and creeds" to join him in donning burlap sacks (representing sackcloth) and having their heads smeared with ashes during a prayer rally intended to show humility and restore God's favor to a city Langford described as wracked with violence. Anticipating complaints from defenders of the Establishment Clause of the First Amendment, Langford stated that "the Constitution of the United States calls for a separation of church and state – it never said anything about a separation of church from state."

=== Pride Week controversy ===
Langford injured relations with the Birmingham LGBT community in May 2008 when he refused to sign a proclamation for the annual Central Alabama Pride Parade, an event that had been held on the city's south side every year since 1989. He refused to allow banners on city property for the event. Langford further stated that it was inappropriate for the government to condone a lifestyle. He was quoted as saying: "My policy is don't ask because it's not my business, and don't put me in the position to make it my business."

"If I were to sign the permit to put up banners on city right of ways I would be condoning that which I don't condone," he said. "To give a proclamation is totally under the purview of the mayor."

Lambda Legal, an LGBTQ legal advocacy group, and Birmingham civil rights attorney David Gespass filed suit on behalf of the Central Alabama Pride group against Larry Langford seeking an order from the courts to prohibit the mayor from discriminating against LGBTQ organizations in administering city services. The organization hoped to use a ruling in their favor to discourage further discriminatory practices in Birmingham and other cities where the legal precedent would apply.

A settlement agreement was reached on September 1, 2009. The settlement, reached after a federal judge ruled against the city and mayor in their efforts to have the case dismissed, comes after Lambda Legal and local attorney David Gespass filed the lawsuit in August 2008 in the Northern District of Alabama on behalf of CAP based on Mayor Langford's actions in refusing to allow city workers to attach Pride banners on city light posts. Members of CAP were allowed, however, to hang the banners on their own after paying the expense of bucket trucks. CAP members alleged that they had been allowed in previous years to hang Gay Pride banners displayed in accordance with the city's practice of attaching banners for a variety of organizations that have held events in the city.

However, in May 2008, the mayor announced that he would neither sign a proclamation nor allow city workers to hang the banners based on his religious beliefs that do not "condone that lifestyle choice." This lawsuit followed initial unsuccessful efforts to negotiate the passage of an even-handed policy. Liberty Counsel represented the city and the mayor.

=== Project proposals ===
In addition to advocating the construction of a domed football stadium, Langford frequently proposed unique and ambitious projects for Birmingham. To overcome the city's mass transit problems, he suggested spending millions on retro-style trolleys. Though Birmingham is more than 250 miles (400 km) inland from the Gulf of Mexico, Langford proposed that a canal be constructed from the Tennessee-Tombigbee Waterway so that cruise ships could dock in the city. He also suggested building a new structure, modeled after The Pentagon, which would house the city jail, police headquarters, fire department headquarters, a police academy, and public works offices. Langford told the Birmingham City Council that he intended to file the paperwork, along with the $500,000 fee, necessary for Birmingham to be a contender to host the 2020 Olympics.

On March 3, 2009, Mayor Langford proposed to the city council that a DVD video be distributed to inner city youth. The video decries "black on black" violence, calling black on black crimes a cultural genocide. The highly controversial DVD, which the local NBC news affiliate referred to as having striking images with racial overtones, depicts images of slavery and the 1960s civil rights movement.

=== Unicorns ===
On July 21, 2009, Langford gave the entire Birmingham City Council small ceramic unicorns as a response to Birmingham City Council President Carole Smitherman's comment that agreeing to the finance director's projection of available revenue in 2010 was the equivalent of saying, "We believe in unicorns."

Following the gift, Langford explained his belief that the unicorn had been a unifying symbol during the reign of King James VI and I who brought together England and Scotland. According to Langford, the gift was meant as a gesture of solidarity.

=== Syphilis coverup ===
In May 2008, the Jefferson County Department of Health began posting advertisements on buses in Birmingham to promote testing and treatment for syphilis. At the time, Jefferson County faced the highest concentration of syphilis cases in the United States, prompting the public outreach campaign. Soon after, Langford controversially ordered the advertisements to be removed, arguing that public recognition of the public health crisis would discourage businesses from investing in the city.

== Public corruption charges ==
=== SEC investigation and lawsuit ===
In 2007, Langford was investigated by the Securities and Exchange Commission (SEC). On April 30, 2008, the SEC charged Langford in federal court with corruption. The lawsuit alleged Langford accepted more than $156,000 in cash and benefits from Montgomery investment banker William B. Blount in exchange for county bond business.

On December 1, 2008, Langford, along with Blount and former state Democratic Chairman Al LaPierre, were arrested by the FBI on a 101-count indictment alleging conspiracy, bribery, fraud, money laundering, and filing false tax returns in connection with a long-running bribery scheme. Langford was led into the courtroom in leg-irons. His public corruption trial ended on October 28, 2009, with convictions on 60 counts, and resulted in his automatic removal from office.

=== Felony conviction and sentencing ===
While Langford was head of the Jefferson County commission, he engaged in a variable-rate auction and bond swaps to raise money to help improve the county's sewer system. Langford was convicted of receiving $235,000 in bribes to help influence the bond deals. According to the indictment, William Blount helped Langford receive a $50,000 loan, which was used to purchase jewelry, including a Rolex watch, and designer clothes. Blount's firm earned $7.1 million in fees from the bond deals while LaPierre was paid $219,500 by Blount for his help the scheme. Jefferson County banks made approximately $120 million by encouraging the county to refinance nearly all of its bonds using swaps. The bonds resulted in a $3.2 billion sewer debt, contributing to the Jefferson County commissioners voting to declare bankruptcy on November 10, 2011, in what at the time was the largest municipal bankruptcy in U.S. history. The U.S. government sought $7.6 million in forfeiture from the three men.

After being convicted in a trial in federal court in Tuscaloosa, Alabama, Langford was serving out a 15-year federal felony sentence until he was resentenced to time served in light of life-threatening health issues. He was held at FMC Lexington, a federal prison hospital near Lexington, Kentucky. He was released on December 28, 2018, after U.S. District Court Judge Scott Coogler commuted his sentence.

== Death ==
Langford died on January 8, 2019. He was 72. His interment was at Elmwood Cemetery and Mausoleum.

Preceded by Bernard Kincaid	Mayor of Birmingham, Alabama; 2007–2009	Succeeded by Carole Smitherman
