= Richard Arrington Jr. =

American entomologist

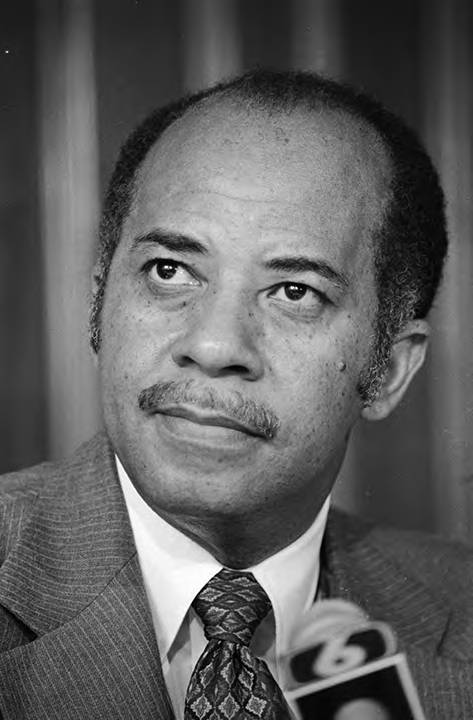
- Arrington is at a microphone, possibly for a news conference.

25th Mayor of Birmingham, Alabama
- In office November 13, 1979 – 1999
- Preceded by: David Vann
- Succeeded by: Bernard Kincaid

Member of the Birmingham City Council
- In office 1971–1979

Personal details
- Born: October 19, 1934 (age 91) Livingston, Alabama, U.S.
- Spouse(s): Barbara Jean Watts (1954–1974); Rachel Reynolds (1975–)
- Children: Anthony, Kevin, Kenneth, Angela, and Erica
- Education: Miles College (BA); University of Detroit (ME); University of Oklahoma (Ph.D)
- Profession: College Professor

Richard Arrington Jr. (born October 19, 1934 in Livingston, Alabama) was the first African American mayor of the city of Birmingham, Alabama (U.S.) and the second African American on the City Council. He served on the council for two terms from 1971 to 1979 and was mayor of the city for 20 years from 1979 to 1999. While in office as mayor and on the City Council, Arrington worked to end police brutality, rebuild the city's economy, and promote equality for all minorities. Throughout his political career, Arrington faced racial harassment and multiple investigations by the FBI and IRS for the changes he made to the city. He replaced David Vann as mayor and, upon retiring after five terms in office, installed then-City Council president William A. Bell as interim mayor. Bell went on to lose the next election to Bernard Kincaid.

== Background ==
=== Early life ===
Arrington's father moved his family to the steel-town of Fairfield, Alabama from rural Sumter County, Alabama when Richard Jr. was five years old to take a job with U.S. Steel. The steady work was an improvement over sharecropping, but Richard Sr. still had to supplement the family income by working off-hours as a brick mason. Richard Arrington Jr.'s parents emphasized self-reliance, choosing to rent a home rather than stay in workers' housing. The family chose to shop at a black-owned cooperative store rather than accept credit at the company commissary. Arrington's mother, Ernestine, kept the table filled with home-grown vegetables and made sure that her children made use of the opportunities given to them through church and school.

He and his family attended the Crumbey Bethel Primitive Baptist Church. He became highly involved in many church activities and leadership roles. While still a teenager, he served as secretary of the Sunday School. Soon, he was Sunday School superintendent, a member of the choir, and eventually elected to the Board of Deacons which he continued to participate in throughout his political career.

=== Education ===
Richard Arrington Jr. was a standout student at Fairfield Industrial High School where he was influenced by the principal, E. J. Oliver. The African American principal led the high school and the students, focusing on morality and discipline. E.J. Oliver became the first leader that young Arrington looked up to. He graduated high school in 1951 at the age of 16. Afterwards, he applied to Fairfield's Miles College. Arrington majored in biology at Miles and excelled in the classroom and as a leader, rising to the presidency of his chapter of the Alpha Phi Alpha fraternity. He was also an officer in the Honor Society and the Thespian Club. He graduated cum laude in 1955.

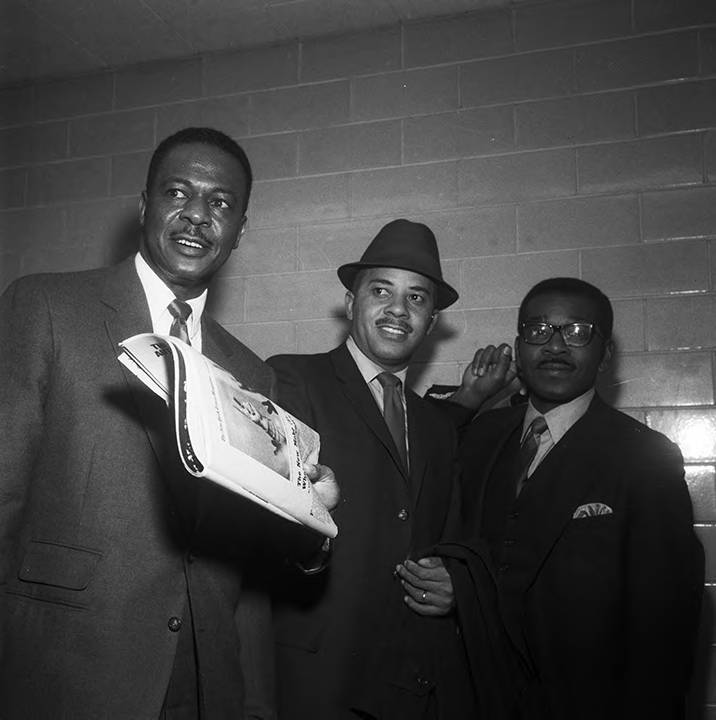
Miles College officials at the airport in Birmingham, Alabama, after receiving accreditation by the Southern Association of Colleges and Schools' Commission on Colleges. Richard Arrington is standing in the center, holding an issue of the New York Times Magazine. With him are Paul Harris and James Williams.

Richard Arrington Jr. took a position as a graduate assistant at the University of Detroit in Detroit, Michigan. While there, he first experienced an integrated social environment and gained the perspective necessary to effectively critique the established segregation of his hometown. He earned a master's degree in 1957 and returned to Miles College as an Assistant Professor of Science where he taught for six years. Arrington entered the University of Oklahoma's doctoral program in Zoology in 1963 in the midst of the Birmingham Campaign between African American protesters and city authorities in Birmingham. He earned his doctorate at Oklahoma in 1966, completing a dissertation on the "Comparative Morphology of Some Dryopoid Beetles", and, at the urging of President Lucius Pitts, returned to Miles as acting Dean and Director of the Summer School. He was quickly promoted to Chair of the Natural Sciences Department and eventually was named Dean of the College.

=== Personal life and family ===
The young Arrington met his first wife, Barbara Jean Watts, in high school. In his third year of college, while still living at home, the two got married. Barbara travelled with Arrington to the University of Detroit where the young couple faced difficulties. Despite struggling to adjust to the big urban city, the two enjoyed their years together. After losing their first child during childbirth, Barbara spent most of her time on their second child, Anthony (Tony) Arrington. After getting his master's at Detroit, the young family moved to Oklahoma for Arrington's doctoral degree. While there, Barbara struggled in the mostly white community. The family faced isolation along with fears for their children: Tony, Kenneth, and Kevin. Despite the schools being integrated, Arrington and Barbara worried about the lack of black students and mentors. Although Arrington spent a lot of hours working on his degree, he made time to spend with his kids and family.

After returning to Birmingham in 1966, the couple began to face marital problems. As Arrington took a job at the Alabama Center for Higher Education (ACHE) and Barbara began to deepen her faith, they faced political disagreements. Along with their differing religious views, the couple began to drift apart. At this point, they had five children (Anthony, Kevin, Kenneth, Angela, and Erica). In 1974, Arrington and Barbara divorced, but the two continued to remain grateful for the years they had together. A year later, Richard Arrington Jr. met Rachel Reynolds at his work whom he married soon after. As Arrington continued in his political career, Rachel supported him in his dream for a unified Birmingham. Even though Arrington held the responsibility and role of City Council member and Mayor, his wife and family offered support and stability during those struggling times. A few years after his retirement from mayor, Arrington and Rachel divorced, and the former mayor faced the death of his daughter, Erica, in 2005.

== City Council 1971-1979 ==
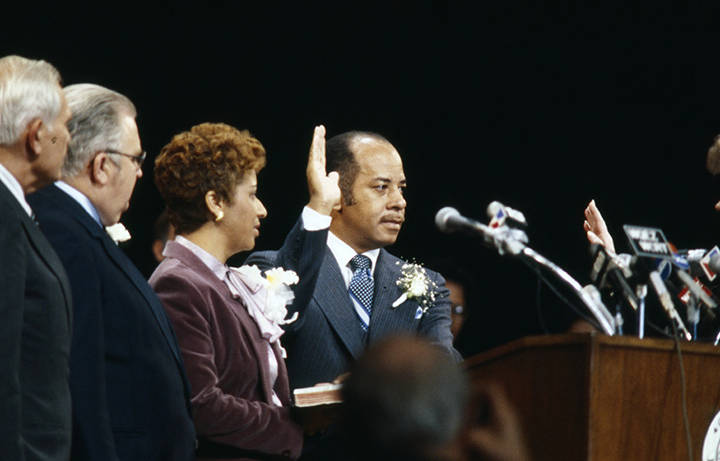
Arrington's wife, Rachel, is standing beside him, and former mayors George Seibels and David Vann are on the left.

=== Campaigns and elections ===
In 1971, Arrington began campaigning for election to the Birmingham City Council with the pledge to make Birmingham "a city of which all her people can be proud." He placed third among 29 at-large candidates and faced five opponents in a runoff election for three remaining seats. Arrington earned a majority of the Black vote and won his seat easily, becoming, after Arthur Shores (who had been appointed to a vacant seat by Mayor George Siebels in 1968), the second African American to serve on the council. He won his first seat on the council due to the large African American voter turnout encouraged by the Jefferson County Progressive Democratic Council and the Alabama Christian Movement for Human Rights. Arrington's second run for City Council was smoother due to the young politician winning a seat without a runoff.

=== Policies and accomplishments ===
While on the council, Arrington worked to promote affirmative action in Birmingham. He introduced an ordinance requiring city departments to formulate hiring plans that included affirmative action goals and to contract business to companies that hired minorities. With opposition in the business community, the latter action failed, but the departmental hiring ordinance made it out of council to be vetoed by Siebels. Revised proposals that established recruitment programs and prohibited contracting with openly discriminatory firms, were later passed.

Arrington's next notable change was to push for a formal investigation into multiple reports of police brutality. One of which was the shooting of Willis "Bugs" Chambers Jr., an African American suspect, while he was under police custody. Chambers, who had been an informant for the police, died on February 21, 1972. After the incident, Arrington insisted the council move to have the Public Safety Committee investigate. The resulting investigation was unprecedented for the city. After seven weeks, the hearing was inconclusive but opened the door to a more serious look at police procedure. In another case of police brutality, Bonita Carter, an eighteen-year-old African American girl, was killed by a white police officer in 1979. After Mayor David Vann refused to fire the officer who shot Carter, Arrington decided to submit his run for mayor to end police brutality and enact more change in Birmingham.

== Mayor 1979-1999 ==
=== Campaigns and elections ===
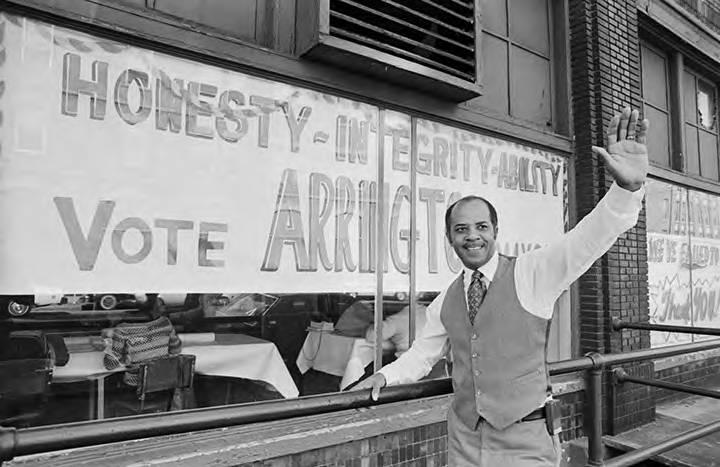
Richard Arrington standing outside the headquarters for his mayoral campaign at 2130 1st Avenue North in Birmingham, Alabama.

Arrington won the 1979 mayoral election due to the Jefferson County Citizens Coalition which helped to mobilize 73% of black voters to vote in the runoff election. Although he had support from only 10% of white voters, African Americans in Birmingham voted in 1979 for the first African American mayor. In his second run for office, Arrington ran against John Katopodis, who was the City Council president. In 1983, Arrington won 60% of the votes in the city, winning reelection for another term. For his third term in office in 1987, Arrington faced three opponents in the polls. His biggest competition was Robert McKee, who was a white lawyer for the city. The other two opponents, Richard Finley and John Hawkins, were both African American politicians. Despite the competition, Arrington won 64% of the vote, earning him another term as mayor. For his fourth run for office in 1991, Arrington faced a federal investigation into his personal and political life which earned him a strong albeit mixed presence in the local media. Even with the investigation, Arrington easily won a fourth term. In 1995, the mayor ran for his fifth and last term as the city of Birmingham's leader. With seven opponents, Arrington still won 54.9% of the vote.

=== Policies and accomplishments ===
Richard Arrington Jr. worked to rebuild Birmingham's economy and infrastructure. Decades after the Great Depression, the industrial city still faced large numbers of unemployment. He worked to bring banking and finance companies as well as expanding the city's solely steel industry to other fields. Under his leadership, the University of Alabama at Birmingham became the city's top employer while also providing medical research and healthcare to the community. Arrington also annexed unincorporated areas near the city to increase its land and tax base. The mayor pushed for policies centering around Birmingham's economy, including creating foundations to revitalize the city center and using federal grants to rebuild Five Points South into a modern district. Additionally, Arrington created the Birmingham Plan in 1989 which was a program where construction contractors set annual goals for various projects in the area.

During his twenty years in office, Arrington also worked to redefine the city's government itself. When first elected to mayor, he wanted to select his own staff, but the decision was met with pushback from the Jefferson County Personnel Board. In the end, Arrington won the fight and was able to select department heads and administrative staff, many of whom were minorities, which brought more professionalism and diversity to the City Hall. Arrington also co-founded and served as the first president of the Alabama New South Coalition, a liberal advocacy organization which split off from the Alabama Democratic Conference over strategic and leadership differences. In 1992, he appointed the city's first African American chief of police, Johnnie Johnson Jr.

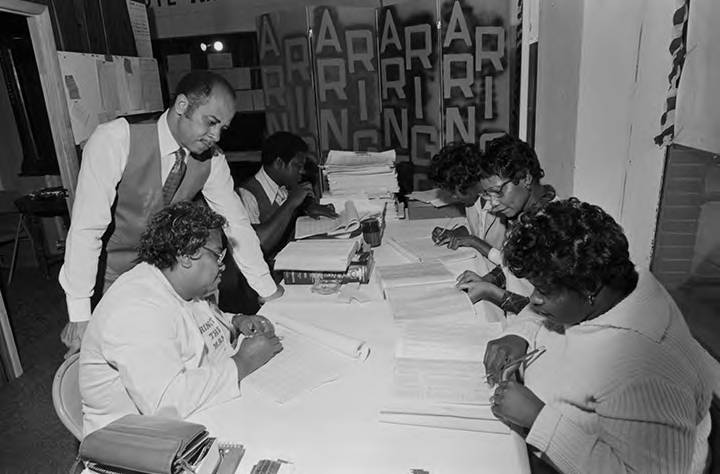
Richard Arrington with staff at the headquarters for his mayoral campaign at 2130 1st Avenue North in Birmingham, Alabama.

== Political challenges ==
Richard Arrington Jr. faced many challenges, but his greatest was the investigation led by the Federal Bureau of Investigation (FBI) and the Internal Revenue Service, Criminal Division (IRS), which lasted throughout his political career. The FBI, led by their racial counterintelligence program (COINTELPRO), launched their investigation into Arrington on January 26, 1972, shortly after he became a member of the Birmingham City Council. During the initial investigation, Arrington had begun speaking out about police brutality, advocating for affirmative action, and even helping create the Jefferson County Citizens Coalition, which helped to mobilize the African American vote in the city. The FBI believed the city council member was an extremist and dangerous in his leadership role. After the initial racial harassment of the FBI towards multiple African American leaders, Congress made amendments to the Freedom of Information Act in 1974, which gave Arrington and other minority leaders a short-lived break from the federal agency.

However, in the 1980s, the FBI began their investigation again, believing the mayor had violated the Hobb's Act. The agency started looking into all of Arrington's finances and political meetings. When asked about whether he had accepted money or bribes in his role, the mayor denied all allegations. The FBI surveillance even looked into Arrington's wife, Rachel, and a retail store she owned. During this time, multiple bugging devices were found throughout City Hall, including the mayor's telephone, but the city of Birmingham was never able to link the devices to the FBI.

In February 1985, Tarlee W. Brown, an architect from Atlanta, Georgia, told prosecutors in Arrington's case that he was paid $5,000 in kickbacks through the Chapel Funeral Services, a funeral home Arrington and his wife owned. The mayor denied taking any money from Brown, stating that he only met with him to encourage him to open an office in Birmingham. After multiple checks into the business of the funeral home, the results showed that no illegal business was being done. In November 1985, the FBI concluded that there was no probable cause in Arrington's case, but the investigation still continued.

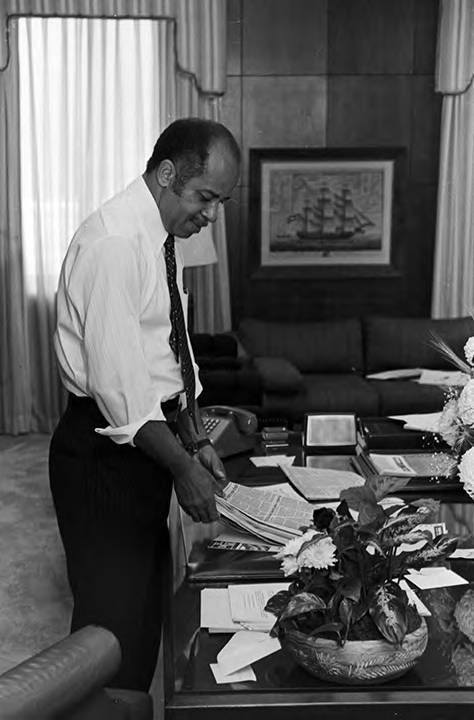
Mayor Richard Arrington looking at a newspaper in his office at city hall in Birmingham, Alabama in 1979.

In April 1989, Robert Mousallem, a real estate developer, came to see Arrington at his home. There, he confessed that the FBI and U.S. Attorney Frank Donaldson had tried to get him to frame the mayor for bribery and corruption for the past three years. In exchange for his help, Donaldson promised Mousallem immunity. The goal was for him to buy property in areas where there were zoning issues and ask the African American politicians for help in rezoning. Then, two FBI agents, Robert A. Hood and James Vaules, would go undercover with Mousallem to gain the mayor's trust and eventually encourage him to take the bribe. The FBI called off Mussallem's attempt to bribe the mayor after other African American politicians declined the bribe. In September 1989, Mousallem was convicted of bribery, conspiracy, and tax evasion and later shot to death, which was ruled an accident. On July 21, 1989, the City of Birmingham filed a complaint to the United States Senate Judiciary Committee about the racial harassment of the FBI and IRS towards Arrington and other African American leaders in the city.

In 1990, the FBI and IRS began looking into Arrington again. Many of Arrington's records, including charities he had donated to, were subpoenaed by a federal grand jury. Marjorie Peters, a city consultant, was convicted of defrauding the city. The press, along with the U.S. Attorney Frank Donaldson, painted her as conspiring with the mayor. An ex-partner of Arrington testified in Peters' case that he had bribed the mayor for city contracts. In 1993, however, Peters conviction was overturned and Arrington's logs showed he never met with his ex-partner.

In 1992, Arrington refused to give up his personal logs to the investigation, claiming the logs would give the FBI, IRS, and U.S. Attorney the ability to fabricate a more believable story and conviction. On January 23 of that year, the mayor was sent to prison for two days at Maxwell Airforce Base in Montgomery, Alabama for his refusal to give up his records. Once U.S. Attorney Frank Donaldson was asked to step down in March 1992, Arrington gave up his records and promised full cooperation to Donaldson's replacement, Jack Selden. The resulting investigation found no evidence of the mayor taking bribes or being involved in illegal activity.

== See also ==
- List of first African-American mayors

Preceded by David Vann	Mayor of Birmingham, Alabama; 1979–1999	Succeeded by William A. Bell (interim)
