= Birmingham City Council (Alabama) =

Council in Birmingham, Alabama, USA

The Birmingham City Council is the legislative branch that governs the City of Birmingham, Alabama, United States. It has nine members elected by district, and regularly meets on Tuesday mornings at Birmingham City Hall. The council has 11 subcommittees, each of which contains three members.

The council was formed in 1963, when the city adopted the Mayor-Council Act of 1955. It replaced the Birmingham City Commission, the city's previous form of government. The council's current president is William Parker; the current president pro tempore is Wardine Alexander.

== Members ==
- District 1: Clinton Woods (2018–present)
- District 2: Hunter Williams (2017–present)
- District 3: Valerie Abbott (2001–present)
- District 4: J.T. Moore (2021–present)
- District 5: Darrell O'Quinn (2017–present)
- District 6: Crystal Smitherman (2018–present)
- District 7: Wardine Alexander (2018–present)
- District 8: Carol Clarke (2021–present)
- District 9: LaTonya Tate (2021–present)
