= Bernard Kincaid =

American politician

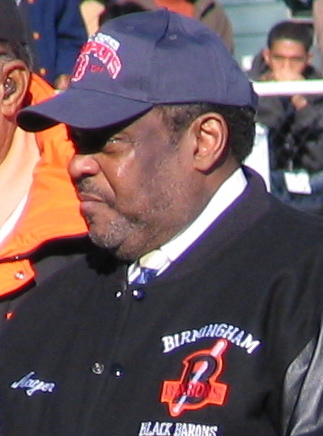

26th Mayor of Birmingham
- In office 1999–2007
- Preceded by: Richard Arrington Jr.
- Succeeded by: Larry Langford

Personal details
- Born: June 5, 1945 (age 81) Birmingham, Alabama, U.S.
- Spouse: Alfreda Harris (m. 1972)
- Children: 1
- Education: Miles College (BA); Miami University (MA); University of Alabama (PhD); Birmingham School of Law (JD)

Military service
- Allegiance: United States
- Branch/service: United States Air Force
- Years of service: 1962–1965
- Battles/wars: Vietnam War

Bernard Kincaid (born June 5, 1945) is an American politician who is the former mayor of Birmingham, Alabama, elected in 1999. In 2007 he was defeated in a bid for re-election, winning only 8% of votes. He was succeeded by Larry Langford.

== Early life and education ==
Kincaid was born in the Birmingham neighborhood of Pratt City, Alabama, the son of a coal-miner. He began his political career early, being elected president of his fifth-grade class at South Pratt Elementary School. He was also president of the Miles College Student Government Association during his senior year of college. He graduated from Western Olin High School in 1962 and received his undergraduate degree from Miles College in 1970. He went on to earn an M.A. from Miami University in Ohio (1971), a Ph.D. from the University of Alabama (1980), and a Juris Doctor from the Birmingham School of Law (1994). He served in the United States Air Force between 1962–66 and was given an honorable discharge.

== Career ==
Kincaid has served as a youth counselor for the Social Security Administration (1970–71), as an educational consultant, assistant professor and as assistant to the Dean of the School of Health Related Professions at the University of Alabama at Birmingham from 1971 to 1995 and contract director of development at Miles College from 1996 to 1997. He was also vice-president and later president of the Ensley Highlands Neighborhood Association and vice-president of the Five Points West community in Birmingham. In 1997, he was elected to represent District 8 in the Birmingham City Council and two years later defeated interim-Mayor William A. Bell in a runoff to become mayor. Kincaid was also member of the Alabama delegation to the 2000 Democratic National Convention.

He is a member of the Metropolitan C.M.E. Church, Ensley and sings in the W. A. Baskerville Gospel Chorus. He is a member of American Legion, Post 1165 and of the Alabama Education Association.

He has sat on the boards of various groups, including the Birmingham Sister City Commission, the Miles College Alumni Association and Booster Club, Omega Psi Phi fraternity, Sigma Pi Phi fraternity, the Jefferson County Progressive Democratic Council, Sigma Kappa Delta law association, Glenwood Mental Health Services foundation, the Birmingham Urban League, the Pratt-Ensley Kiwanis Club, and the Birmingham Partnership.

By virtue of his position, he also held positions on the boards of the Birmingham Jefferson Convention Complex, the Birmingham Racing Commission, the Metropolitan Planning Organization, the Jefferson County Mayors Association, Alabama Conference of Black Mayors, and U.S. Conference of Black Mayors.

== Personal life ==
Kincaid lives in Ensley. He has been married to the former Alfreda Harris since New Year's Eve 1972 and has one daughter, Amy.

Preceded by William A. Bell (interim)	Mayor of Birmingham, Alabama; 1999 — 2007	Succeeded by Larry Langford
