= William A. Bell =

American politician

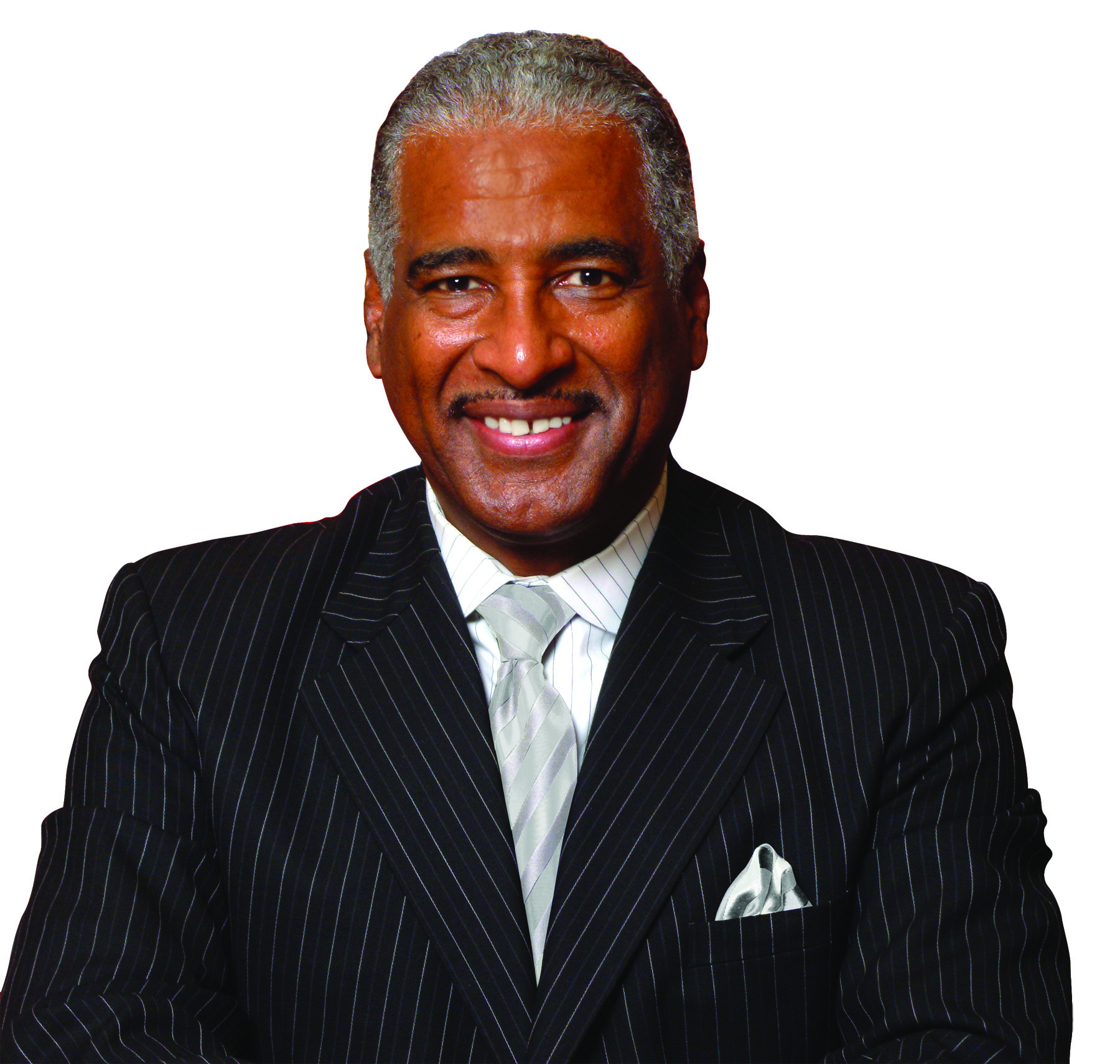
- Bell in 2008

33rd Mayor of Birmingham
- In office January 26, 2010 – November 27, 2017
- Preceded by: Roderick Royal
- Succeeded by: Randall Woodfin

Personal details
- Born: June 1, 1949 (age 77) Birmingham, Alabama, U.S.
- Party: Democratic

William Anthony Bell Sr. (born June 1, 1949) is an American politician who served as the 33rd mayor of Birmingham, Alabama, from 2010 to 2017. He had previously held the office on an interim basis in 1999. Prior to that, he had served several terms on the Birmingham City Council. He is a member of the Democratic Party.

== Political career ==
=== Birmingham City Council ===
Bell was first elected to the Birmingham City Council in November 1979, and in 1985 became the first African-American selected to serve as council president.

=== Mayor ===
Bell was the only mayor in the city's history that brought in over $2 billion of business development for Birmingham and was instrumental in overseeing the renaissance of Birmingham with projects that brought international recognition including the World Games, the Senior Games, Railroad Park, Regions Baseball Field, worked with President Obama and UNESCO in naming Birmingham a World Heritage site and National Park that also recognized Birmingham's Civil Rights History. Other Civil Rights historical landmarks that are included in Bell's visionary project include the Sixteenth Street Baptist Church, Bethel Baptist Church, the Birmingham Civil Rights Institute, the A.G. Gaston Motel and several other historical sites. Bell also led in the development of the Birmingham Sports Crossplex and over $300 million in capital improvements for the Birmingham City School System and the University of Alabama in Birmingham, in spite of coming into office with a $77 million deficit left by the prior administration. Bell grew the city of Birmingham reserves to over $350 million when he left office.

On December 15, 2015, Bell was involved in a physical altercation with Councillor Marcus Lundy during a city council meeting. Both men were treated at a local hospital for minor injuries. Two days after the altercation, Bell and Lundy publicly apologized in a press conference.

Facing re-election, Bell finished second in the primary election on August 22, 2017 among twelve candidates and advanced to the general election. On October 3, 2017, Bell was defeated by former Birmingham Board of Education President Randall Woodfin.

After his loss, Bell appeared onstage at the Magic City Classic alongside T.I. and declared that Woodfin would take Birmingham "to the motherfucking top." Woodfin jokingly referenced the incident during his inaugural address a month later. Bell notably did not attend Woodfin's inauguration.

== Personal life ==
Bell is a Catholic.

Political offices
Preceded by Richard Arrington Jr.	Mayor of Birmingham, Alabama (Interim); 1999	Succeeded by Bernard Kincaid
Preceded by Roderick Royal (Interim)	Mayor of Birmingham, Alabama; 2010–2017	Succeeded by Randall Woodfin
