= Archbishop Jonathan Blake =

British archbishop

Jonathan Clive Blake (born 1956) is a British archbishop of the Open Episcopal Church, activist, author, most known for conducting the first gay wedding blessing on Richard and Judy's prime time TV programme This Morning, conducting the wedding blessing for the late media personality, Jade Goody, campaigning for equal marriage, becoming the "country's first freelance vicar" celebrating sacramental services in people's homes and the community, and conducting the first baptism on top of Mount Snowdon. co-consecrating the first female bishops in England, Elizabeth Stuart, in Scotland, in Northumbria, and Wales, and offering the Mass to all by post. He has also attained over 100,000 followers on TikTok as of September 2026.

== Late priesthood and Open Episcopal Church ==
Blake co-founded the Open Episcopal Church alongside Bishop Richard Palmer and Bishop Michael Wilson on 10 November 2001. He had severed his denominational ties to the Church of England via effecting a Deed of relinquishment.

== Early life and education ==
Archbishop Jonathan Blake was born in 1956 and survived an air flight emergency during his childhood. He taught for one year before gaining his degree at Durham university in 1978. During his undergraduate days he established a shop selling goods from the poorer countries which became a successful aid project that traded for over 25 years and embedded a commitment to Fair Trade into the continuing life of the College.

== Personal life ==
Blake embarked on a hitchhiking journey to Calcutta, that saw him tear-gassed in Teheran and seized by machine gun-toting guards in Kabul. He escaped an attempt on his life while in India. Upon his return, he completed his training in Nottingham. In 1991, he was convicted of Criminal Damage for a Gulf War Protest losing his appeal, and meeting with the Pope about inter-faith work and peace. In 1997, he wrote "For God's Sake Don't Go To Church", which highlights the dangers of getting involved in dogmatic religion. In the same year, he nailed 95 theses to the door of Canterbury Cathedral, calling for reform of the Church, akin to Martin Luther, for which he was arrested but not charged. He is married to Annette and they have three children. In 2009, he accused the police of assault. In 2014 he wrote "That Old Devil Called God Again". In 2021 he wrote a collection of children's stories, illustrated by Catherine Daw "The Tales of Henry the Lovable Hedgehog" and since has published an inclusive version of the New Testament, Psalms Book of Common Prayer, and an Inclusive Book of Meditation and Readings. and his latest, "Replacing God, Religion and Christianity with Love".

== Altruist acts ==
Blake volunteered as a Samaritan, smuggled Bibles and goods to Christians behind the 'Iron Curtain' with the Christian Mission to the Communist World. He worked with Mother Teresa's Missionaries of Charity in Calcutta, India, in the Home for the Dying and in the slums. At 21, he raised over £20,000, using a quarter for direct relief work and investing the remaining £15,500 through the Church of North India in a trust to fund a T.B. hospital for women in Howrah. In 1985, he highlighted the plight of the homeless by sleeping on the streets during 'One World Week'. He was elected onto the Executive Committee of the World Conference on Religion and Peace, as the International Youth Co-ordinator, at their fourth World Assembly in Nairobi and travelled to Pakistan, and across Europe to promote inter-faith initiatives for peace and justice. In 1987, he organized and led an international group of fifty young people from twelve different faiths on a journey of reconciliation from London to Auschwitz and then to Moscow. He volunteered as a Relate, Marriage Guidance Counsellor and an Independent Custody Visitor. He worked with the homeless, accommodating them from the streets, even in his own home. He has been putting up Christmas lights since 2002, at first for Save the Children, but since 2019, to install water in four Gambian villages (5 by mid 2025), as well as to provide school supplies, sports equipment and shoes, and raising so far £90,000. He was awarded a Just Giving fundraising hero certificate in 2025.

== Religious History ==
Blake was ordained a priest for the Church of England in 1982. He served within the Church of England for over eleven years. He worked as a Curate in Bradford, where he wrote the lyrics for and produced a musical on the life of Saint Francis of Assisi, which was performed at the University theatre, as well as performing as the voice of Jesus (broadcast over the speakers) to accompany the one acting, silently, as Jesus, in the city's Open Air Easter Passion, and Rochester, where, as Chaplain, he began the first inter-faith chapel at St Bartholomew's Hospital. He was the Vicar of Barnehurst for 5 years, overseeing a major building development. He served as Director of the Week of Prayer for World Peace. Blake was consecrated a bishop in 2000 and elected Archbishop in 2006.
