= Lucius Holsey Pitts =

American college president and Black educational leader (1915–1974)

Lucius Hosley Pitts Sr.

President of Miles College
- In office 1961–1970
- Preceded by: William A. Bell
- Succeeded by: W. Clyde Williams

4th President of Paine College
- In office 1971–1974
- Preceded by: E. Clayton Calhoun
- Succeeded by: Julius Samuel Scott Jr.

Personal details
- Born: February 28, 1915 James, Georgia, U.S.
- Died: February 25, 1974 (aged 58) Augusta, Georgia, U.S.
- Spouse: Dafferneeze Bates
- Children: 4
- Education: Paine College, Fisk University
- Occupation: Minister, theologian, educator, academic administrator

Lucius Hosley Pitts Sr. (February 28, 1915 – February 25, 1974) was an American minister, theologian, educator, and academic administrator. He served as the president of Miles College in Fairfield, Alabama from 1961 to 1970, and became the first African American president of Paine College in 1971. He was active in Birmingham, Alabama during the Civil Rights movement, and was a leader within black educational institutions for many years.

== Early life and education ==
Lucius Hosley Pitts Sr. was born on February 28, 1915, in James, Georgia. His parents were Eugene Pitt and Katherine Daniels. His father was a tenant farmer and his mother died at an early age. Pitts was the first in his family to finish high school. He was a licensed C.M.E. minister by the age of sixteen.

While Pitts was attending college he became temporarily blind, obliging him to withdraw from school for three years. He washed dishes in order to help pay for his school tuition. He earned his bachelor's degree from Paine College in Augusta, Georgia when he was twenty-five. He was awarded a postgraduate degree from Fisk University in 1945, and furthered his postgraduate studies at Atlanta University (now Clark Atlanta University) in Atlanta, Georgia; Peabody College (now Vanderbilt Peabody College of Education and Human Development) in Nashville, Tennessee, and at Western Reserve University (now Case Western Reserve University) in Cleveland, Ohio.

== Career ==
=== Georgia Teachers and Education Association ===
From 1955 until 1961, Pitts was the executive secretary of the Georgia Teachers and Education Association (GTEA), a non-profit professional association and advocacy group of public school educators. He helped in building the GTEA group into a powerful lobby for Black education in the state.

=== Miles College and the Civil Rights movement ===
Pitts started his educational career as the president of Miles College in Fairfield, Alabama from 1961 until 1970. He was instrumental during his presidency in stabilizing the college’s finances so that Miles College could apply for accreditation via the Southern Association of Colleges and Schools’ Commission on Colleges in 1969. He also was able to double student enrollment to 1,200 and increase the budget.

During his time at Miles College and during the Civil Rights movement protests, Pitts helped the faculty and students protest. He provided Miles College students opportunities such as boycotting, civil rights marches and protest in Birmingham Alabama for Black students to voice their opinion about different civil rights issues. Lucius believed in the non-violent approach. Pitts also tried to ease race relations with the white people of Birmingham, Alabama during this time. Pitts was a member of the Central Committee 1963, a group of civil rights movement organizers that met at the A.G. Gaston Motel during the Southern Christian Leadership Conference's Birmingham campaign.

In 1967, Pitts had brought national attention to Miles College, a then-unaccredited institution, when he persuaded John U. Monro to resign the deanship of Harvard College to join his faculty as director of freshman studies.

"The idea that the predominantly white college can or will service the kinds of people that we have serviced for 100 years and continue to serve is nothing less than an impossible and improbable rhetorical statement."

— Pitts (1970) in regards to the importance of Black educational institutions

In 1970, Pitts led a five hour conference with leaders from other Black educational institutions to discuss the Nixon administration intensifying racial tensions by failing to support black education. On hand at the is conference was Harold Stinson, president of Stillman College in Tuscaloosa, Alabama; George Owens, president of Tougaloo College, Tougaloo, Mississippi; Rembert Stokes, president of Wilberforce University in Wilberforce, Ohio; Lemore Carter, representing Texas Southern College in Houston, Texas; and John Monro, who was serving as director of freshman studies at Miles College. That same year in 1970, Pitts ran for a seat in the State Legislature of Alabama and lost.

Pitts had also served as a vice president for the board of directors at the Southern Regional Council, Atlanta; and as vice president for Commission on Cooperation and Council. Working for the Commission on Cooperation and Council, he served the United Methodist and the Christian Methodist Episcopal churches.

=== Paine College ===
In 1974, when Pitts joined as president of his alma mater Paine College in Augusta, Georgia, he was the first Black president of the school in its 89 years of history. At Paine College, Pitts led an effort to rebuild Haygood Hall, a campus building from 1899 that had burned down in a 1968 fire. Before his death, Pitts had met with president Richard Nixon to discuss the role and importance of African American educational institutions.

== Death and legacy ==
Pitts died of a stroke while working on February 25, 1974, in Augusta, Georgia, and was buried on the Paine College campus next to the Gilbert-Lambuth Memorial Chapel. He was survived by his wife Dafferneeze, and their four children.
