= Consultation on Church Union =

- COCU Logo
- Founded: 1960
- Type: Religious
- Purpose: Ecumenism, Mainline Christianity
- Location: North America
- Origins: Sermon by Eugene Carson Blake in 1960
- Region served: North America

The Consultation on Church Union (COCU) was an effort towards church unity in the United States, that began in 1962 and in 2002 became the Churches Uniting in Christ. It was a significant part of the Christian movement towards ecumenism. This effort can be seen in the context of the worldwide ecumenical attitude that was manifested in the 1948 formation of the World Council of Churches, the 1950 formation of the National Council of Churches, the 1957 formation of the United Church of Christ, and the formation of the Roman Catholic Pontifical Council for Promoting Christian Unity during the Second Vatican Council (which occurred from 1962 to 1965). The original task of COCU was to negotiate a consensus between its member denominations (originally the Protestant Episcopal Church, the Methodist Church, the United Church of Christ, and the UPCUSA).

== Origin ==
On December 4, 1960, Eugene Carson Blake, the stated clerk of the United Presbyterian Church in the U.S.A., on the invitation of Episcopal Bishop James Pike, delivered a sermon at Grace Cathedral in San Francisco, in which he proposed the creation of a Protestant "superchurch". In response, the UPCUSA's General Assembly, approved an overture at its General Assembly meeting to work together with the Protestant Episcopal Church in order to invite the Methodist Church and the United Church of Christ to explore the concept of union. The Episcopal church accepted the invitation. Representatives from the four churches met in Washington, D.C. in 1961 and proposed a first official meeting of the churches for the following year at the College of Preachers and Wesley Theological Seminary. It was at that 1962 meeting that the group, which had come to include the Presbyterian Church in the United States, the mainline "Southern Presbyterians", first called itself the "Consultation on Church Union". The first churches to be invited to join COCU beyond the first four were the International Convention of Christian Churches (Disciples), the Polish National Catholic Church, and the Evangelical United Brethren Church, which later merged with the Methodist Church to form the United Methodist Church. All North American churches were invited to send observers. At the next meeting, in 1963, the Disciples of Christ joined, and it was decided to stop sending individual invitations and instead simply accept applications. 16 other churches attended the 1963 meeting as observers.

Time magazine reported that a meeting in Dallas in May 1966 produced a timetable for merger that called for "creation and ratification of a union plan within 13 years, followed by some 30 years of federation during which a constitution will be prepared." Among delegates from the eight churches then involved were Methodist theologian Albert Outler, Episcopal bishop Robert Gibson of Virginia, and United Church of Christ minister David Colwell. By 1967, ten churches (including two pairs, Presbyterian and Methodist, which later merged) were members of the consultation:

- African Methodist Episcopal Church
- African Methodist Episcopal Zion Church
- Christian Church (Disciples of Christ)
- Christian Methodist Episcopal Church
- Episcopal Church
- Evangelical United Brethren Church
- Methodist Church
- Presbyterian Church in the U.S.
- United Church of Christ
- United Presbyterian Church in the U.S.A.

=== Churches of Christ Uniting ===
Churches of Christ Uniting was a proposed name for a body growing out of the Consultation on Church Union which began in 1962 among ten predominantly "mainline" U.S. Protestant denominations. The consolidation proposed in the original scheme was overwhelmingly rejected when put to a vote of the constituent denominations in 1969, so the leaders, unwilling to abandon totally this effort, adopted more of a "go slow" approach. Groups within the Consultation began closer contacts, and in some instances full communion, with each other, and the idea to call the group that was hoped to be formed in the long term Church of Christ United was proposed, with the interim name while the process was ongoing to be Church of Christ Uniting. (These names had the additional advantage of having the same initials as the initial Consultation on the Church Union.)

Opposition within the component denominations, particularly the United Presbyterian Church, caused any plan for a full merger to be put on hold, and a new name, seemingly implying that "uniting" is a presently-ongoing but perhaps long-term goal, was adopted, Churches Uniting in Christ. (This name also had the advantage of not sounding as much like one of the existing constituent groups, the United Church of Christ, nor like an entirely unrelated one, the Church of Christ.)

== The 1970 Plan of Union ==
Despite intense negotiations, membership of the denominations overwhelmingly rejected the "Plan of Union" when it was proposed in 1970. Much agreement was reached on the first six and a half chapters of the proposal ("From Unity to Union", "What it Means to be God's People", "To Be Members in This Community", "The Living Faith", "This People at Worship", and the first half of "To Be Ministers of Christ"), but when specifics of ministry came up, there was significant disagreement.

In 1972 after the devastation caused by Hurricane Agnes in the Wilkes-Barre/Kingston, Pennsylvania, area, the Methodist Church and Presbyterian Church, one block apart in Kingston, considered the wisdom of spending so much money to reconstitute two expensive buildings. Quickly the discussion moved from "Should we merge?" to a discussion of "Is there any reason we should NOT merge?" The pastors talked with denominational leaders and worked on a plan after chatting extensively with COCU in Princeton, NJ, and receiving excellent direction for their idea. In October 1973, the new entity came into existence: The Church of Christ Uniting in Kingston, PA.

== Intercommunion ==
A key phrase associated with COCU was “catholic and reformed” (later, “catholic, evangelical, and reformed”). With the failure of the Plan of Union that had become clear by 1972, COCU turned in 1973 to negotiating "intercommunion", whereby each member church would retain its own autonomy and identity, while recognizing the validity of the rites, membership, and ministry of the others and accepting them as true churches. This proposal, submitted to the churches in 1979, was titled "The COCU Consensus: In Quest of a Church of Christ Uniting". It was one part of a three part proposal; the other two parts were first published as "Covenanting Toward Community: From Consensus to Communion" and later republished with revisions in 1989 as "Churches in Covenant Communion".

== Episcopal structure ==
The proposal contained in "Churches in Covenant Communion" was to be done on the historic episcopal model of bishop, presbyter and deacon. The document was approved by seven churches: the ICC (1989), the CME church (1994), the Disciples of Christ (1995), the AME church, AMEZ church, UCC, and UMC (1996). However, the Presbyterian Church USA was unwilling to implement some of the changes to its internal rules that this model would require and had concerns over the role of elders (presbyters), and the Episcopal Church did not feel able to participate at the time, having concerns about the role of bishops (episcopacy). It was then proposed that intercommunion be established without a resolution of the ministry issue. It was stated that "full reconciliation of ministries, as well as resolution of any remaining challenges, is a goal we seek to accomplish and proclaim by the time of the Week of Prayer for Christian Unity 2007."

== Dissolution ==
After forty years of talks, COCU voted (in 1999) to dissolve in 2002 and to reconstitute itself as Churches Uniting in Christ (CUIC).

== Documents ==
- Blake, Eugene Carson, "A Proposal Toward the Reunion of Christ's Church", preached in Grace Cathedral, San Francisco, December 4, 1960.

COCU produced several ecumenically developed texts:

- The Principles of Church Union
- A Plan of Union for the Church of Christ Uniting,
- Mutual Recognition of Members in One Baptism,
- In Quest of a Church of Christ Uniting
- The COCU Consensus
- Covenanting Toward Community
- Churches in Covenant Communion
- Lenten booklets such as Liberation and Unity,
- the COCU liturgy of the Lord’s Supper,

== Notable people involved in the COCU effort ==
- Eugene Carson Blake
- Albert J. duBois Episcopalian opponent
- Arthur Marshall
- Harold Johnson
- Robert Taylor
- James McCord

== See also ==
- COCU Lectionary
