= Ray S. Tomlin =

American Methodist minister, educator, academic administrator, and college president

Ray Silver Tomlin

President of Paine College
- In office 1923–1929
- Succeeded by: Edmund Clarke Peters

President of Paine College (interim)
- In office 1921–1923
- Preceded by: Albert Deems Betts

Personal details
- Born: October 10, 1899 Phoenix, Arizona Territory, U.S.
- Died: October 27, 1972 (aged 73) Fayette, Missouri, U.S.
- Spouse: Dollie D. Moore
- Occupation: Educator, minister, academic administrator, college president

Ray Silver Tomlin (October 10, 1899 – October 27, 1972) was an American Methodist minister, educator, academic administrator, and college president. He served as the president of Paine College in Augusta, Georgia, from 1921 to 1923 (as interim) and from 1923 until 1929.

== Early life and education ==
Born on October 10, 1899, in Phoenix, Arizona Territory, and he moved with his family to a farm in Missouri. Tomlin received a Bachelor of Divinity from the Garrett Bible Institute and a Master's degree from Northwestern University.

He was a teacher at Consolidated High School in Hardin, Missouri, from 1918 to 1921.

== Paine College career ==
The school was established at the end of the Civil War by the Colored Methodist Episcopal Church (now Christian Methodist Episcopal Church, a historically black denomination) and the Methodist Episcopal Church South (now United Methodist Church, a historically white denomination) to educate the formerly enslaved Black citizens on how to become teachers and ministers. The original endowment included $16 raised in pennies from former slaves. Originally started as a college and as a high school, by 1903 sufficient college-level work was provided to justify changing the school's name from Paine Institute to The Paine College.

From 1921 to 1923, Tomlin served as an interim president of Paine College in Augusta, Georgia; followed by serving as president from 1923 to 1929. Tomlin – a White college president – believed that the school would be best served by hiring a Black faculty, which was not a popular position in Augusta, Georgia in the 1920s. In 1929 he was fired for his controversial stand.

== Late life ==
Punishing him for his position, the Methodist Episcopal Church South church banished him to a poor circuit of churches in rural Missouri where he became a circuit preacher, traveling to a different church each Sunday. He was never bitter and spent the rest of his life ministering to the small farm communities in central Missouri.

Tomlin died on October 27, 1972, in Fayette, Missouri.
