= Julius S. Scott =

American historian (1955–2021)

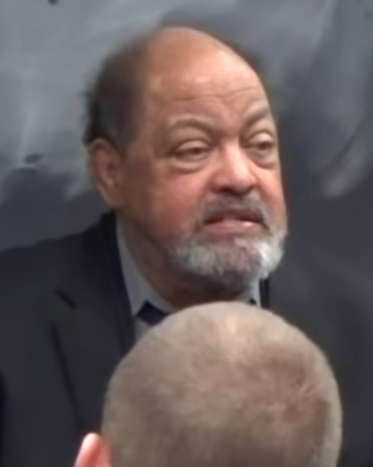
- Scott in 2018
- Born: Julius Sherrod Scott III; July 31, 1955; Marshall, Texas, United States
- Died: December 6, 2021 (aged 66); Ann Arbor, Michigan, United States
- Parent: Julius Samuel Scott Jr. (father)

Academic background
- Education: Brown University (A.B.); Duke University (Ph.D.)
- Thesis: The Common Wind: Afro-American Currents in the Age of Revolution
- Influences: Henri Lefebvre; C.L.R. James

Julius Sherrod Scott III (July 31, 1955 – December 6, 2021) was an American scholar of slavery and Caribbean and Atlantic history. He was best known for his influential doctoral thesis and later book The Common Wind: Afro-American Currents in the Age of the Haitian Revolution. Scott's original thesis has been regarded as "arguably the most read, sought after and discussed English-language dissertation in the humanities and social sciences during the 20th century", elevating the historian to the position of an intellectual "cult figure among scholars" in the field.

== Early life ==
Julius Sherrod Scott III was born on July 31, 1955, in Marshall, Texas, to Julius Samuel Scott Jr. and Ianthia "Ann" Scott née Harrell. His grandfather, Julius Sebastian Scott Sr., served as the ninth president of Wiley College (1948-1958). His father Julius Jr. was a Methodist minister who later served as president of Paine College (1975–1982) and Wiley College (1996–2001); his mother Ann was a librarian.

According to his mother, young "Scotty" was a bright child with a precise sense for language. In 1961, he began attending MacGregor Elementary School in Houston as one of the first Black students in its newly-integrated first grade class. Despite the instruction being officially integrated, Scotty and the Black girl in his class were only permitted to use a single segregated restroom outside the school. Scotty’s parents learned of this fact only after hearing him say "Thank you, God, for letting me have my own bathroom at school" during his prayers.

After Scotty completed second grade, his parents moved the family to Providence, Rhode Island, where Julius Jr. had accepted a job at Brown University. Scott enrolled at Brown in 1973 and received a bachelor of arts in history from the university in 1977. He attended Duke University for graduate studies, earning a doctorate in history in 1986.

== Career ==
=== The Common Wind ===
Scott’s doctoral dissertation "The Common Wind: Afro-American Currents in the Age of Revolution" formed the basis of his later, highly influential work of the same title. After spending time in North Carolina preparing for field research, in February 1982 he started examining archives of the British Vice admiralty court in Kingston, Jamaica, then proceeded to Port-au-Prince, Haiti in April 1982 to study Haitian archives. He submitted his completed dissertation in 1986.

As an unpublished dissertation The Common Wind was cited hundreds of times in scholarly literature. In Time, historian Vincent Brown called the dissertation "so exciting, original, and profound" that it inspired "an entire generation to create a new field of knowledge about the past". Eugene Holley, writing in Publishers Weekly, described the dissertation as "renowned for its creativity, imaginative research and graceful prose". In the early years after its completion, graduate students at Duke passed a Xeroxed copy of the thesis from person to person like an "underground mixtape", treating it as a model for how to study and center Black life in the Atlantic World.

Scott initially signed a contract with Oxford University Press to publish the dissertation in book form shortly after completing his degree, but did not agree with suggestions for revision and opted not to publish the book. Aside from a selection from one chapter of the dissertation reprinted in the 2010 volume Origins of the Black Atlantic, which Scott co-edited, the dissertation remained unpublished until a Verso Books editor, referred by another historian, offered to publish the text with minimal revisions. The Common Wind was published by Verso in 2018.

=== Academic positions ===
In 1986, Scott was hired to teach for one year at Rice University. Scott taught at Duke from 1988 to 1994, where he helped to train scholars including Vincent Brown, Jennifer L. Morgan, and Claudio Saunt. Subsequently, he held a joint faculty appointment in the departments of History and of Afroamerican and African Studies at the University of Michigan in Ann Arbor, Michigan, where he died on December 6, 2021, from complications related to diabetes.
