= Open Episcopal Church =

UK Christian denomination (2001-)

- Classification: Christian
- Theology: Liberal Christianity
- Founder: Jonathan Blake

The Open Episcopal Church (OEC) is a liberal Christian denomination. It has bishops in England and Wales and clergy throughout the United Kingdom and internationally. It has over 29,000 members.

The church was the first in Britain to ordain a woman as bishop and to perform religious wedding ceremonies for gay couples.

The OEC is a member of the International Council of Community Churches, which in turn is a member of the World Council of Churches and Churches Uniting in Christ.

== History ==
=== Founding of the Society for Independent Christian Ministry ===
In 1994 Jonathan Blake, who had been a priest in the Church of England for over 12 years, effected a Deed of Relinquishment, severing his denominational ties.

As an independent priest he offered sacramental ministry to all. In 1997 he wrote about these experiences in his book, For God's Sake Don't Go To Church. The same year he nailed 95 theses to the door of Canterbury Cathedral, for which he was arrested but not charged.

A lesbian from the north of England arranged to meet Blake after reading his book. She felt a call to the ministry but had been rebuffed by the church over her sexuality and was interested in independent ministry. Following the meeting Blake placed an advert in the Church Times inviting all those interested in such a ministry to a conference the following March. Over 100 people contacted him, among them Richard Palmer, who had been consecrated as a bishop of the Liberal Catholic Church in 1997, but had resigned in April 1999.

Blake wrote the Founding Principles of the Society for Independent Christian Ministry (SICM), which was inaugurated by a group of Christians reciting the Lord’s Prayer in the Sanctum of the Holy Circle Trust near Ryarsh in Kent at sunrise on 1 January 2000.

In February 2001, Blake conducted the first gay wedding blessing on Richard and Judy's prime time TV programme This Morning.

=== Founding of the Open Episcopal Church ===
By the time SICM met for the third time in Bournemouth, Palmer required those who had been ordained simply in Dartford to be ordained sub conditione at this gathering in a full rite of ordination. Blake realized that a new denomination had to be founded and set about writing the necessary canons.

At Hazlewood Castle, Michael Wilson was consecrated a bishop by Palmer and Blake. The three bishops issued the "Hazlewood Declaration" on 10 November 2001, which facilitated the creation of the Open Episcopal Church. The church viewed itself as being in succession from the Old Catholic Church, which had been established in England in 1908 by Arnold Mathew from See of Utrecht and continued through the Liberal Catholic Church. The first congress of the church was held at the All Saints Pastoral Centre in June 2004. The church's college of bishops met at Weston Manor in Oxfordshire in January 2005 and Wilson, an evangelical, resigned from the Church. The second congress was held at Whaley Hall at Whaley Bridge in mid 2005. In October, Roger Whatley was consecrated a bishop in the Chapel of the Ammerdown Conference Centre.

=== Development ===
The church has had three archbishops: Richard Palmer, who left the church along with Roger Whatley after the allotted five-years of Palmer's tenure as archbishop ended; Elizabeth Stuart, who left the church in 2006 and was appointed the Archbishop of the Province of Great Britain and Ireland of the more traditionalist Liberal Catholic Church International; and Jonathan Blake, OEC's founder, who was the church's sole remaining bishop after Stuart left.

In 2008 the Open Episcopal Church became a member of the International Council of Community Churches and through them, a member of the World Council of Churches and Churches Uniting in Christ.

The church received national and international attention due to the wedding blessing Blake conducted for reality television figures Jade Goody and Jack Tweed, through interviews broadcast after Jade Goody's death, through the prayer released before Jade Goody's funeral, through Blake's response to Michael Parkinson's criticism of Goody, through the launch of Post the Host (an outreach provision to distribute the consecrated Hosts by post), and through David Gillham leading the prayers in the Scottish Parliament.

Following Jade Goody's wedding, Christopher Woods, Chaplain and Director of Studies in Theology at Christ's College, Cambridge, called upon the Church of England to speak out against Blake and the OEC. The Church of England declined to comment.

The church consecrated the first woman as a bishop for Wales in 2007. The bishop of Scotland, David Gillham, ordained Helen Hamilton at St Magnus Cathedral, Kirkwall, Orkney in 2010; Gillham later fell into dispute with the church and left. Hamilton was subsequently consecrated as the first woman bishop for Scotland in June 2012. She made an episcopal visit to Derry. In 2013 the church consecrated a female bishop for Northumberland.

Blake contributed to the book A Strange Vocation: Independent Bishops Tell Their Stories in 2009, and contributed liturgical material to Geoffrey Duncan's anthology Courage to Love and Leanne Tigert and Maren Tirabassi's compilation All Whom God Has Joined. In 2014 Blake's book That Old Devil Called God Again: The Scourge of Religion was published.

The church has clerics from Anglican, Roman Catholic, Pentecostal, Lutheran and Franciscan backgrounds and has grown internationally into America, Egypt, Brazil and Thailand. The church promotes its KITE Awards for young people making a positive difference in the community.
