= Lesbian theology =

Theological method related to feminist theory

Lesbian theology is a theological field that was created by lesbian academics and scholars. It is an intersectional field covering both feminist theology and queer theology. This theological field is broad and draws from a wide body of research spanning multiple religions. Among the Abrahamic tradition however, there is a more focused body of research.

Among progressive Catholics, this field is academic and lived functioning as a means to highlight lesbian experiences and to reduce androcentrism in the field of queer theology.

In Catholic writings, scholars discuss how early gay theologians failed to make connections between misogyny and homophobia. Feminist analysis of queer theology reveals it often fails to address the specific issues lesbians face as they are confronted with both homophobia and misogyny.

== Historical Theological Development ==
Lesbian theology has developed across multiple denominations of varying faith groups.

=== Abrahamic ===
==== Judaism ====
Leor Elizur, in 2024, found most previous research on LGBTQ Jewish people to be predominantly male leaning and out of date. As a result of this, Elizur studied six Jewish lesbians to analyze their identities through a lens of anthropology. This research found lesbian Jewish identities to be intersectional. Also noted was a growing disconnect with the greater queer community as the number of lesbian spaces decrease.

==== Christian ====
Lesbian feminist theology first started forming in 1984 with author and theologian Carter Heyward establishing a connection between homophobia and misogyny, then proceeding to analyze that through a lens of queer theology.

Christian Perspectives on Sexuality and Gender includes a section by theologian Elizabeth Stuart covering lesbian theology finding it is best analyzed through the umbrella of sexual theology. She rejects the reliance on biblical authority and calls for seeking divine revelation through community.

In 2001, Joseph Coray published Sexual Diversity and Catholicism: Toward the Development of Moral Theology this book contains a section on Mary E. Hunt who identifies Catholic feminist lesbian theology as a derivative of Catholic feminist theology. The section criticizes androcentrism and emphasizes the importance of expanding notions of sexuality beyond the gay male experience.

The topic of lesbian theology was covered by Dialog: A Journal of Theology in 2009 by Mary Elise Lowe. She found there were significant differences between queer and gay/lesbian theologies.

Theologian Anne Atwell noted in 2020 how often lesbians in religious spaces faced prejudice both because of their gender identity and sexuality. She also called for further development of the field of lesbian theology. Atwell that small group consisting of people who identify as lesbians could be created to further theological development.

Oona Leiviskä in 2021 differentiated gay and lesbian theology from queer theology by stating that gay and lesbian theology is focused on sexuality while queer theology was focused on what is queer in of itself. This shows how queer theology references a very broad field whereas lesbian theology is focused more on the relationship of lesbians to their respective religions.

In 2022, authors Jack Slater and Susannah Cornwall highlighted how lesbian theology should not be reduced to a broader queer or gay theology. They also identify lesbian theology as placing importance on erotic friendship, describing it as empowering.

Later, in 2023, theologian Anderson Fabian Santos Meza highlighted how singer Chavela Vargas found divine origin in her lesbian identity, framing her identity as a divine gift.

L. Joubert created an article in 2024 identifying the creation of a lesbian theology in reaction to the marginalization experienced by lesbians in both homosexual and feminist theological spaces.

==== Islam ====
Adherents of Islam holding intersectional lesbian and Muslim identities have been documented. Research findings from 2008 suggest lesbians and bisexual muslim women report criticism for holding both a lesbian identity and a muslim identity causing a reduced sense of belonging.

=== Dharmic ===
==== Hinduism ====
Many reports of gay and lesbian marriages within the Hindu framework have been made. However, as Ruth Vanita describes in 2009, many of these same-sex unions are perceived differently because the couples getting married had never been exposed to the concept of "lesbian" or "gay". According to an interview she conducted with Swami Bodhananda Saraswati, a Vedanta teacher, Saraswati stated: "'There is no official position in Hinduism. From a spiritual or even ethical standpoint, we don't find anything wrong in it."

==== Buddhism ====
In Buddhism there is a variety of attitudes towards homosexual conduct, ranging from inappropriate to allowed, since Buddhism does not rely on scripture that applies to every practitioner and lacks a centralised authority.

Some queer Buddhist practitioners find Buddhism sometimes can foster an altered sense of identity. Some lesbian Buddhists say they now reject understandings of their gender and sexuality that are rooted in essentialism.

Fung Kei Cheng writes that Buddhism creates a very accepting environment for lesbians along with people of other marginalized sexual identities. Bhante Dhammika explains that nothing makes the individual actions of a gay person immoral unless they cause harm to others.

== People ==
- Marcella Althaus-Reid
- Mary Glasspool
- Virginia Ramey Mollenkott

== See also ==
- Queer theology
- Queer theory
- Feminist theology
- Feminist theory
