= Christian Churches Together =

American organization for broad-based interfaith fellowship

- Founded: 2006
- Type: Interdenominational fellowship
- Headquarters: Ada Township, Michigan, US
- Region served: United States
- Members: 34 Christian denominations and organizations
- Website: www.christianchurchestogether.org

Christian Churches Together in the USA (CCT) is an organization formed in 2006 to "broaden and expand fellowship, unity, and witness among the diverse expressions of Christian traditions in the USA" and that represents over 98 million Christians in the United States.

Christian Churches Together was created as a space for dialogue and cooperation among churches and ecumenical Christian organizations. It does not attempt to combine Christian denominations or compromise their distinctiveness. Rather, it provides a context in which churches can develop relationships with other churches with which they currently have little or no contact. Christian Churches Together includes most, if not all, Christian traditions in the United States (including Catholic, Orthodox, historic Protestant, Evangelical/Pentecostal, and historically Black churches). It also includes non-denominational Christian organizations. The organization's primary activity is the annual forum. In recent years, topics addressed at the annual forum have included gospel perspectives on life, immigration, mass incarceration, poverty, and racism. CCT speaks out only on issues on which all the churches agree, reaching decisions through a consensus model.

== Mission statement ==
"CCT brings together the diversity of Christian churches and organizations in the U.S. to foster loving relationships, cultivate theological learning, and discern through consensus how we bear witness to the reconciling power of Jesus."

== The CCT process ==
Based on its vision and mission statements, CCT has established a process for organizing its ministry. This process is intended to apply to both the national CCT and any local expressions that may be established. The organization describes this as a "work in progress" that includes several assumptions:

1. Participants are described as being called to humility before Christ and each other. This emphasis, expressed through worship and proclamation, is included at the beginning of gatherings and throughout meetings.

2. The organization states that it seeks to include new groups of Christians in its ministry, with a particular emphasis on younger adults. A stated goal is for 20% of forum attendance to be under age 35 by the 2026 forum. This goal is intended to involve engagement with leaders of faith communities and Christian organizations.

3. This approach to inclusion extends to other ecumenical groups, organizations, and regional councils within the United States. CCT states that it engages with these groups through outreach and partnerships. Conversations are held and invitations are issued. The process is intended to be replicated in regional and state ecumenical councils and associations.

4. CCT states that it makes decisions by consensus. Emphasis is placed on building relationships and understanding, and disagreements may occur. Joint action is taken only when consensus is reached. Members are encouraged to take action within their own faith communities and within coalitions.

5. CCT states that it works to improve religious literacy among Christians in the United States, and that the concept of receptive ecumenism is considered foundational. The organization includes the annual participation of invited experts on designated topics from within participating groups, representing a range of perspectives. These individuals are drawn from different perspectives within participating groups and assist with Bible study, theology, and dialogue.

6. The organization states that bylaw changes may be necessary as this process is implemented. When needed, the Bylaws Committee reviews proposed changes and presents them to a forum for consensus. In the interim, the organization states that it implements the described changes with some flexibility.

== Leadership ==
As of 2022, the executive director of Christian Churches Together is Dr. Monica Schaap Pierce, a member of the Reformed Church in America. Her predecessors were the Rev. Carlos Malave and the Rev. Richard ("Dick") Hamm.

== History ==
In 2001, some U.S. church leaders began discussing the possibility of forming a new organization that would provide a broader-based space than the National Council of Churches or the National Association of Evangelicals. On September 7–8, 2001, various American church leaders met informally in Baltimore to explore whether the time had come to "create a new, more inclusive body." At the meeting, no votes were taken, but there was a strong desire among the participants for a broader structure that would include all the major groupings of churches.

This conversation continued in Chicago (April 4–6, 2002), Pasadena (January 27–29, 2003), Houston (January 7–9, 2004), and Los Altos (June 1–3, 2005), with an ever-expanding and more diverse group of Christian leaders. As a result of these efforts, 34 churches and organizations formed Christian Churches Together in the U.S. in Atlanta on March 30, 2006. In 2017, the Bruderhof Communities, the Redeemed Christian Church of God, and the International Justice Mission joined CCT.

Participants in CCT include churches and associations of churches that are national in scope, as well as national Christian organizations and worldwide churches such as the Salvation Army, which has a territory (national division) in the United States. Participant churches and organizations must accept and endorse the theological basis and purposes of CCT. They agree to attend meetings regularly and to pay the established dues.

== Member churches and organizations ==
As of 2024, the members are:

Member Denomination or Organization	Tradition
Antiochian Orthodox Christian Archdiocese	Eastern Orthodox
Armenian Apostolic Church in America	Oriental Orthodox
Bread for the World	Organization
Bridge of Hope	Organization
Bruderhof	Anabaptist
Christian Church (Disciples of Christ)	Restorationist
Christian Reformed Church in North America	Reformed
Church of God (Anderson, Indiana)	Holiness
Church of the Brethren	Anabaptist
Cooperative Baptist Fellowship	Baptist
Christians for Social Action	Organization
Episcopal Church USA	Anglican
Evangelical Lutheran Church in America	Lutheran
Greek Orthodox Archdiocese of America	Eastern Orthodox
Habitat for Humanity International	Organization
Hope for You	Organization
International Council of Community Churches	Interdenominational
International Justice Mission	Organization
International Pentecostal Holiness Church	Pentecostal
Korean Presbyterian Church Abroad	Reformed
Mennonite Church USA	Anabaptist
Moravian Church	Moravian
National Baptist Convention of America	Baptist
National Baptist Convention, USA	Baptist
Orthodox Church in America	Eastern Orthodox
Presbyterian Church (USA)	Reformed
Reformed Church in America	Reformed
Salvation Army	Holiness
Sojourners	Organization
Syriac Orthodox Church of Antioch Archdiocese	Oriental Orthodox
United Methodist Church	Methodist
United Church of Christ	Reformed
United States Conference of Catholic Bishops	Roman Catholic
Vineyard USA	Neo-Charismatic
Zomi Baptist Churches of America	Baptist

== See also ==
- Churches Uniting in Christ
