= William Augustus Bell =

American businessman, educator (1882–1961)

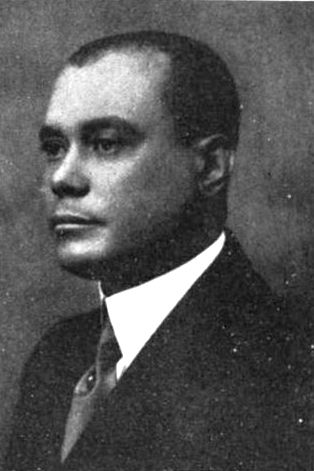
- Bell (c. 1906)

11th President of Miles College
- In office 1936 – January 24, 1961

4th President of Miles College
- In office 1912–1913

Personal details
- Born: February 16, 1882 Elbert County, Georgia, U.S.
- Died: January 24, 1961 (aged 78) Fairfield, Alabama, U.S.
- Spouse: Helen Matile Caffey
- Children: 3
- Education: Paine College, Columbia University
- Occupation: Businessman, educator, academic administrator, university president

William Augustus Bell (1882–1961) was an American businessman, educator, academic administrator, and university president. He served two terms as president of Miles College, a private historically black college in Fairfield, Alabama.

== Early life and education ==
William Augustus Bell was born on February 16, 1882, in Elbert County, Georgia, to parents Mary J. (née Thompson) and Luther H.A. Bell. His father was a farmer and real estate developer. Since his early childhood, the Bell family was part of the Christian Methodist Episcopal Church and attended St. Paul CME Church. He attended Elberton Public School.

Bell attended Paine College (high school degree 1901, A.B. degree 1906) in Augusta, Georgia; and Columbia University in New York City. In 1913, he married Helen Matile Caffey from Charleston, South Carolina, and together they had three children.

== Career ==
From 1908 until 1912, Bell was the chair of the mathematics department at Miles Memorial College (now Miles College). He became president of Miles College in 1912, a role he served for one year. From 1913 to 1917, Bell went back to Paine College, his alma mater, and became dean of the college and served as the chair of the sociology and economics department.

During World War I in 1917, Bell volunteered at the Army Y.M.C.A. and worked at Camp Jackson in Alabama. In 1919 he became secretary of the Interchurch World Movement. Bell went back to Paine College as field secretary in 1930 during the Great Depression, and then was appointed in 1934 secretary of education for the Colored Methodist Episcopal Church (now the Christian Methodist Episcopal Church). After two years in that position he returned to Miles College as president, where he served until his death in 1961. He guided Miles College from the brink of bankruptcy following the Great Depression and helped establish a foundation.

He died in his sleep on January 24, 1961, in Fairfield, Alabama.
