= Community Church movement =

The Community Church movement aims to bring together and support local community churches.

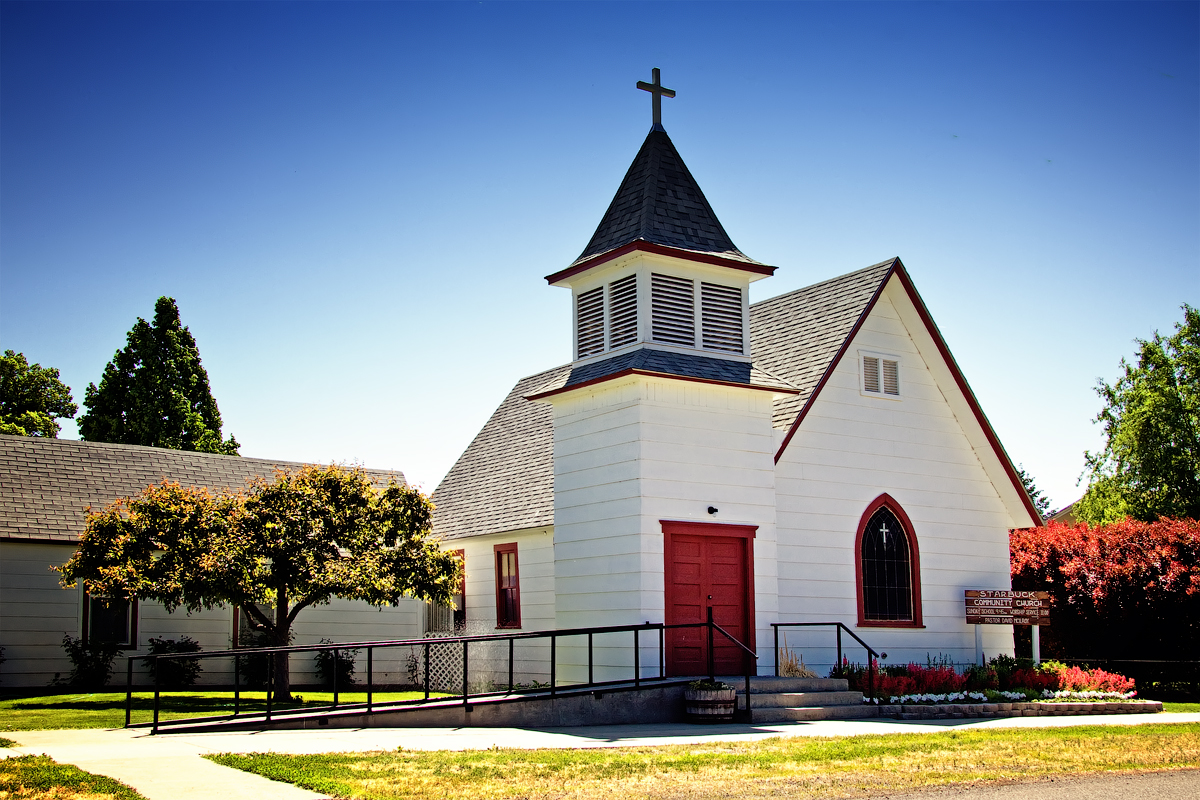
Community Church, Starbuck, Washington, USA

Community churches have existed in the United States since the early nineteenth century. Small communities did not always have the population or finances to sustain churches of all Christian denominations, so community leaders would cross denominational lines and pool their resources to support a single church. By the early twentieth century, with the ecumenical movement in full swing, community churches were ready to cut formal ties with denominations and to demonstrate Christian unity-in-diversity. Community churches began to understand themselves as post-Protestant and postdenominational.

== Origins of the movement ==
=== Community Church Workers ===
One of the first organized efforts to unite the community churches of America began in the early 1920s. Orvis Jordan of[Park Ridge Community Church became the secretary of the Community Church Workers of the United States (CCW-US) and its first newsletter editor. Jordan was later named the group's first president.

=== International Council of Community Churches ===
The CCW was the forerunner of the white community-church group that merged with a similar African-American group in 1950 to form the International Council of Community Churches (ICCC). Peoples' Church of Chicago, First Community Church of Columbus, Ohio, and St. Paul Community Church of Shorewood, Illinois, joined the Park Ridge church and other churches in this effort.

The term "community" has also been adopted by those who, while holding strict Biblical doctrinal principles, shun ecumenism as compromise and simply wish to indicate that they are not a part of any particular denomination or what has become known in certain circles as the "Emerging Church" yet wish to indicate an openness and welcome to the community at large.

Today the ICCC flourishes as a model of living ecumenism: it is a member of the World Council of Churches, the National Council of the Churches of Christ in the USA, and the Council on Church Union.

== See also ==
- Intentional community
