= Shirley A. R. Lewis =

American educator, academic administrator (born 1937)

13th President of Paine College
- In office 1994–2007
- Preceded by: Julius Samuel Scott Jr.
- Succeeded by: George C. Bradley

Personal details
- Born: Shirley Ann Redd; June 11, 1937 (age 88) Winding Gulf, West Virginia, U.S.
- Spouse: Ronald McGhee Lewis
- Children: 1, Mendi Lewis
- Education: University of California, Berkeley, Stanford University
- Occupation: Educator, academic administrator, college president

Shirley Ann Redd Lewis (née Redd; born June 11, 1937) was an American educator, academic administrator, and college president. In 1994, she was the first female president of Paine College, a private, historically black Methodist college in Augusta, Georgia. Her research focus was in language acquisition in education. She also held roles at Vanderbilt Peabody College of Education and Human Development, and Meharry Medical College.

== Early life and education ==
Shirley Ann Redd was born on June 11, 1937 in Winding Gulf, West Virginia. Her parents were Thelma Danese Biggers Redd and Ronald F. Redd, her father worked as a school teacher. When she was young her parents divorced, which caused her to move with her mother in order for her mother to find work; together they moved to Beckley, West Virginia; Harlem, New York City; Cambridge, Massachusetts, and eventually settle down in Berkeley, California. Her mother worked as a children's nurse. She attended Berkeley High School.

She graduated from University of California, Berkeley (1960 B.A. in Spanish and M.S.W. in social work); and Stanford University (PhD 1979 in education). She also did graduate level teaching credential work at San Francisco State University and California State University, Hayward (now California State University, East Bay).

== Career ==
From 1962 until 1963, she worked as a Spanish teacher at the Ravenswood City School District in East Palo Alto.

After her marriage, she and her husband traveled to Africa three times. The first visit was to Ghana in 1966; followed by Liberia, Senegal, Nigeria, and Ivory Coast; and again to Ghana in 1968. In 1968, she and her husband received certificates in Africa studies from a joint program hosted by the University of Ghana and the University of London.

In the 1970s, Lewis worked for welfare rights organizations and at community schools. From 1972 to 1975, she taught English classes at Nairobi College, a private junior college in East Palo Alto, California. She also taught linguistics at Foothill College, a public community college in Los Altos, California. While attending graduate school she worked as a supervisor of the Stanford Teacher Education Program from 1972 until 1974. This was followed by work at Stanford University School of Education's program on cultural and linguistic pluralism, where she co-authored linguistic research papers. Her doctorate degree was awarded in 1979 in education, with a focus on language acquisition for bilingual and bidialectical students.

From 1979 to 1980, she moved to Nashville, to hold an adjunct professor role at the Vanderbilt Peabody College of Education and Human Development. From 1981 to 1984, Lewis worked as an educational specialist at Meharry Medical College. In 1984, she was appointed to associate dean of academic affairs at Meharry. This was followed by executive director role at the United Methodist Church's Black College Fund from 1986 to 1991, and a promotion to assistant general secretary in 1992.

In 1994, Lewis was elected president of Paine College, replacing Julius S. Scott Jr. Within the 41 schools in the United Negro College Fund system, she was one of four women elected to president. Lewis was also the first female president at Paine College, in its 112 years of existence. She served as president of Paine College until 2007.

Files of Lewis’s work with the United Methodist Church Black College Fund are located in Nashville, Tennessee. Files from her presidency of Paine College are located at the campus.

== Personal life ==
She married Ronald McGhee Lewis in 1963, and together they had one daughter. In 2022, her husband Ronald Lewis died at age 87 in Montclair, New Jersey.
