= Churches Uniting in Christ =

US ecumenical organization (founded 2002)

- Founded: January 20, 2002
- Type: Religious
- Purpose: Ecumenism, mainline Protestantism
- Location: North America
- Origins: Consultation on Church Union
- Region served: North America
- President: Rev. Rock R. Fremont Jr., OCC
- Vice President: Dr. Pene’ Woods
- Secretary: Rev. Dr. Amariah H. McIntosh
- Treasurer: Rev. Grayson Hicks Dye
- Affiliations: Partnered with National Council of Churches, World Council of Churches, Graymoor Ecumenical & Interreligious Institute, and Samuel DeWitt Proctor Conference
- Website: www.churchesuniting.org
- Formerly called: Consultation on Church Union

Churches Uniting in Christ (CUIC) is an ecumenical organization that brings together mainline American denominations (including both predominantly white and predominantly black churches), and was inaugurated on January 20, 2002, in Memphis, Tennessee on the balcony of the Lorraine Motel. It is the successor organization to the Consultation on Church Union.

== History ==
=== Origins ===
CUIC is the successor organization to the Consultation on Church Union (COCU), which had been founded in 1962. The original task of COCU was to negotiate a consensus between its nine (originally four) member communions (it also included three "advisory participant" churches). However, it never succeeded in this goal, despite making progress on several ecumenical fronts. At COCU's 18th plenary meeting in St. Louis, Missouri (January 1999), CUIC was proposed as a new relationship among the nine member communions. Each member communion voted to join CUIC over the next few years.

=== Inauguration ===
Heads of communion from each member of COCU (as well as the ELCA, a partner in mission and dialogue) inaugurated the group on the day before Martin Luther King Jr. Day in 2002 at the motel where he was killed. This particular location highlighted the group's focus on racism as a major dividing factor between and among churches.

=== Task forces ===
The Coordinating Council of CUIC created several task forces: Racial and Social Justice, Ministry, Young Adult and Local and Regional Ecumenism. Each task force represented an important part of early CUIC work. Local ecumenical liturgies were encouraged, and excitement initially built around "pilot programs" in Denver, Los Angeles, and Memphis. The Racial and Social Justice task force created gatherings and discussions on racial justice. The Ministry task force received much of the attention from church structures, however. The group had been given a mandate to complete work on reconciliation by 2007, and in 2003 began working on a document entitled "Mutual Recognition and Mutual Reconciliation of Ministries."

=== Mutual Recognition and Mutual Reconciliation of Ministries (MRMRM) ===
One of the most difficult issues concerning recognition and reconciliation of ministries was that of the historic episcopate. This was one of the issues that defeated proposals for union by COCU as well. The group approached this problem through dialogue, soliciting information from each member communion on the particularities of their theology and ecclesiology in order to come to a mutually acceptable conclusion.

CUIC released the seventh and final draft of the MRMRM document in June 2005. Much work was done in 2006 on this document, which focused on "Episkope," the oversight of ministry. The work culminated in a consultation on episkope in St. Louis in October 2006 involving the heads of communion of the members of CUIC. At this consultation, the MRMRM document was met with resistance, and concern was raised in particular that CUIC was focusing too narrowly on reconciliation of ministries and "not taking seriously our commitment to working on those issues of systemic racism that remain at the heart of our continuing and separated life as churches here in the United States."

=== Moravian Church (Northern Province) ===
The nine churches which inaugurated CUIC in 2002 were joined by the Moravian Church, Northern Province. The Moravians had been partners in mission and dialogue since 2002, but joined as a member communion after the October 2006 consultation on episcope.

=== Suspension of activities ===
In 2007, the African Methodist Episcopal Zion Church and the African Methodist Episcopal Church withdrew from CUIC. Neither body sent representatives to the CUIC plenary on January 11–14, 2008, though the AME Council of Bishops never voted to suspend membership officially. They felt the other churches were not doing enough to counter the history of racial injustice between black and white churches. In response to this, the remaining churches in CUIC decided in 2008 to suspend their work while they seek reconciliation with these churches. This work began with a group of representatives who revisited the 1999 document "Call to Christian Commitment and Action to Combat Racism," which is available on the current CUIC website. This also meant eliminating the position of Director as well as the suspension of the work of the CUIC task forces. As of 2012, CUIC no longer has physical offices, opting instead for a virtual office and storing the archives of both CUIC and COCU at Princeton Seminary's Henry Luce III Library.

=== Reconciliation efforts ===
The African Methodist Episcopal Church resumed its participation by the February 2010 plenary meeting, where CUIC moved to refocus on its eight marks of commitment and a shared concern for racial justice as a major dividing factor facing ecumenism. Although the African Methodist Episcopal Zion Church has not rejoined the group, efforts have continued to bring this communion back into membership. The Rev. Staccato Powell, an AMEZ pastor, preached at the 2011 CUIC plenary in Ft. Lauderdale, Florida as a part of these reconciliation efforts. Combating racism has again become a priority of CUIC. Concerns over the historic episcopate have been sidelined since 2008, though they may re-emerge. The group's focus on mutual reconciliation of ministries has been revisited in the light of racism and the impact that racism may have on exchanging ministers between denominations. Therefore, the coordinating council of CUIC created a consultation on race and ministry while also choosing to partner with the Samuel Dewitt Proctor Conference, a social justice organization involved in African American faith communities.

== Purpose ==
The purpose of CUIC has always been unity (as reflected in their current slogan, "reconciling the baptized, seeking unity with justice"). This reflects one of the core scripture passages in the ecumenical movement, Jesus' prayer in John 17:21, "That they all may be one". CUIC has approached this goal of unity in various ways throughout its history.

=== Racism ===
Racism has been a primary focus of CUIC since 2002 (and, indeed, a primary focus of COCU alongside other forms of exclusion and prejudice, such as sexism and ableism). According to Dan Krutz, former president of CUIC, "Overcoming racism has been a focal point of CUIC since its beginning... Racism may be the biggest sin that divides churches." Even before the absence of the AME and AMEZ churches at the January 2011 plenary, some in CUIC had noticed the lack of commitment to racial reconciliation. Since 2008, however, racism has become an even more pressing concern. This has led CUIC to address issues of racism in the public sphere, including the killing of Trayvon Martin and the recovery from the 2010 Haiti earthquake.

=== Marks of Commitment ===
According to their website, one of the reasons for transitioning from COCU to CUIC is so that member churches "stop 'consulting' and start living their unity in Christ more fully." This means that each member communion in CUIC agrees to abide by the eight Marks of Commitment, which are summarized as follows:

- Receive each other as Christ's church
- Mutually recognize baptisms & members
- Affirm apostolic creeds
- Celebrate Eucharist together
- Engage in mission & anti-racism
- Promote wholeness & inclusion
- Structure accountability, consultation & decision-making
- Support ongoing theological dialogue

== Membership ==
=== Full members ===
- African Methodist Episcopal Church
- African Methodist Episcopal Zion Church
- Christian Church (Disciples of Christ)
- Christian Methodist Episcopal Church
- Episcopal Church (United States)
- International Council of Community Churches
- Moravian Church in North America
- Presbyterian Church (USA)
- United Church of Christ
- United Methodist Church

=== Partners in mission and dialogue ===
- Evangelical Lutheran Church in America

== Leadership ==
=== Presidents ===
President	Denomination	Tenure
Bishop Melvin Talbert	United Methodist Church	2002–2004
The Rev. C. Dana Krutz	Episcopal Church (United States)	2004–2006
Suzanne Webb	Christian Church (Disciples of Christ)	2006–2011
Bishop Ronald Cunningham	Christian Methodist Episcopal Church	Jan 2011–Oct 2011
The Rev. Robina M. Winbush	Presbyterian Church (USA)	Oct 2011–2019
Bishop Teresa E. Jefferson-Snorton	Christian Methodist Episcopal Church	2019–2023
Rev. Dr. Jean Hawxhurst	United Methodist Church	2023—2026
Rev. Rock R. Fremont Jr., OCC	International Council of Community Churches	2026—Current

=== Vice Presidents ===
Vice President	Denomination	Tenure
Jacquelyn DuPont Walker	African Methodist Episcopal Church	
Bishop Jeffrey N. Leath	African Methodist Episcopal Church	
Dr. Pene’ Woods	Christian Methodist Episcopal Church	present

=== Directors ===
Director	Denomination	Tenure
Bertrice Wood	United Church of Christ	2002–2005
Thomas Dipko	United Church of Christ	2005–2006
Rev. Patrice Rosner	Christian Church (Disciples of Christ)	2006–2008

== Networking partners ==
- National Council of Churches
- World Council of Churches
- Graymoor Ecumenical & Interreligious Institute

== See also ==
- Christian Churches Together
- Christian ecumenism
- Mainline Protestant
- United Church of Christ
