= The Common Wind =

2018 nonfiction book by Julius S. Scott

The Common Wind: Afro-American Currents in the Age of the Haitian Revolution
- Author: Julius S. Scott
- Language: English
- Genre: Nonfiction social science
- Publisher: Verso Books
- Publication date: 2018
- Publication place: United States
- Media type: Print (Hardcover)
- Pages: 272
- ISBN: 9781788732475

The Common Wind: Afro-American Currents in the Age of the Haitian Revolution is a 2018 book by Julius S. Scott, based on his influential but previously unpublished 1986 Duke University doctoral dissertation. The book traces the circulation of news in African diasporic communities in the Caribbean around the time of the Haitian Revolution, and links the "common wind" of shared information to political developments leading to the abolition of slavery in the British and French Caribbean.

== Summary ==
The book's title comes from an 1802 William Wordsworth sonnet devoted to Toussaint Louverture. In Scott's book, "the common wind" refers to the shared information communicated among African diasporic communities by African-Americans who worked in ships, docks, and ports around the time of the Haitian Revolution. Scott reconstructed the flow of this information through archival research and documentary analysis of newspapers, shipping records, and both official and unofficial correspondence. The book describes the system by which black sailors, slaves and freemen in the Caribbean carried "ideas, news, and rumors of equality and liberation from port to port". While Scott's analysis centers on Saint-Domingue, Jamaica, and Cuba, it also incorporates material about other ports in what he calls the "masterless" Caribbean, such as Martinique, Trinidad, and Grenada.

Despite increased efforts by colonial powers to minimize the flow of information about slavery in the New World, African diasporic communities in the Caribbean learned about slave uprisings and efforts to re-enslave emancipated freemen of African descent. Fugitive slaves and freemen became links in a communication network that connected multiple islands within the region. As a consequence of the "common wind" of information, these communities developed an autonomous political identity that was more radical than those in African diasporic communities in Europe or the American colonies. This communication across national and geographic boundaries "contributed to the destabilization and eventual collapse of the slave system".

== Background ==
Scott researched and wrote The Common Wind as his Duke University PhD dissertation. After spending time in North Carolina preparing for field research, in February 1982 he started examining archives of the British vice admiralty court in Kingston, Jamaica, then proceeded to Port-au-Prince, Haiti in April 1982 to study Haitian archives. He submitted his completed dissertation in 1986.

As an unpublished dissertation The Common Wind was cited hundreds of times in scholarly literature. In Time, historian Vincent Brown called the dissertation "so exciting, original, and profound" that it inspired "an entire generation to create a new field of knowledge about the past". The dissertation was the subject of a 2008 conference at the University of Michigan titled "The Common Wind: Conversations in African American and Atlantic Histories" that reviewed its impact on the fields of African-American history and Atlantic studies. Eugene Holley, writing in Publishers Weekly, described the dissertation as "renowned for its creativity, imaginative research and graceful prose".

== Publication ==
Scott first submitted his dissertation manuscript to Indiana University Press, but the submission was rejected. Shortly after completing his degree, he initially signed a contract with Oxford University Press to publish the dissertation in book form, but did not agree with suggestions for revision and opted not to publish the book. Aside from a selection from one chapter of the dissertation reprinted in the 2010 volume Origins of the Black Atlantic, which Scott co-edited, the dissertation remained unpublished until a Verso Books editor, referred by another historian, offered to publish the text with minimal revisions.

== Reception ==
Reviews of the 2018 book were generally favorable, and reflected the dissertation's influence on the field of Atlantic history. In The Nation, historian Manisha Sinha described the broad influence of Scott's work on American historiography, observing that the "history of the black Atlantic as it is currently known would simply not have been possible without Scott’s immense contributions". The Los Angeles Review of Books praised the quality of Scott's writing, but also attributed the book's scholarly influence to Scott's unique ability to find evidence of hidden and ephemeral communications within sources that deliberately concealed those communications. In Public Books, Mary Caton Lingold favorably noted that Scott organized the book around historical stories and events rather than academic debates.

Criticism of the book focused on its lack of updates since the dissertation was written. Writing for The New York Review of Books, David Bell suggested that Scott could have done additional research in French archives to expand the book's treatment of Saint-Domingue, particularly how its residents received news from other areas. In The Journal of American History, Ashli White similarly noted that the book did not address more recent scholarship in the field or incorporate new research or sources, but concluded that the book nevertheless "offers fresh insights with each rereading".

In 2019, the Gilder Lehrman Center for the Study of Slavery, Resistance, and Abolition gave The Common Wind a Special Achievement Award at its annual Frederick Douglass Book Prize ceremony. Scott also received the 2019 Stone Book Award and $25,000 in prize money from the Museum of African American History, with one prize juror describing the book as "vital for how we think about so many things". The following year, the Caribbean Philosophical Association gave The Common Wind its annual Frantz Fanon Outstanding Book Award.
