= Albert Outler =

American theologian and professor

Albert Cook Outler (November 17, 1908 – September 1, 1989) was an American Methodist historian, theologian, and pastor. He was a professor at Duke University, Yale University, and Southern Methodist University. He was a key figure in the 20th-century ecumenical movement.

== Biography ==
Outler was born and raised in Georgia and was an ordained Methodist elder who served in several appointments. He graduated from Wofford College and received his Doctor of Philosophy degree from Yale University, teaching at both Yale and Duke University before beginning a long tenure at Southern Methodist University in Texas. He taught courses in Christian history, Christian theology, Christian doctrine, and Wesleyan studies.

He was a delegate to Consultation on Church Union, served on the Faith & Order board of the World Council of Churches and was an official observer representing Methodists at the Second Vatican Council. He was a key figure in the 20th-century ecumenical movement.

== Theological contribution ==
Along with his contemporaries Colin Williams, Frank Baker, and John Deschner, Outler's work on John Wesley became a catalyst for contemporary Wesleyan scholarship.

Outler's contributions to Methodist history and theology include his book John Wesley for "The Library of Protestant Thought" series, the first book that argued for Wesley as an important theologian in the Western tradition, as well as his critical editions of Wesley's Sermons for the Works of John Wesley editorial project.

Outler is widely credited with being the first to recognize John Wesley's method for theologizing, via what Outler referred to as the Wesleyan Quadrilateral: scripture, church tradition, reason, and personal experience. This understanding of Wesleyan theology is prevalent throughout Methodism, particularly in the United Methodist Church. Using this model, Outler was a key figure in organizing the theological statement put forth by the United Methodist Church after its formation in 1968. Some argue that his most original contribution was the introduction of the concept of church "Tradition" into Wesleyan theology.

With his many references to the early church, Outler's work has proven very influential to those in the paleo-orthodox movement and contemporary evangelicalism, notably Thomas C. Oden, like Outler, a United Methodist clergyman.

He also wrote books and articles on patrology, psychotherapy, and theology. Many of his writings have been collected in the Albert Outler Library series by Bristol House publishers.

== Works ==
=== Books ===
- Outler, Albert C. (1940). The "Platonism" of Clement of Alexandria. Chicago, Ill.: [publisher not identified].
- Outler, Albert C.; Bowen, C. A. (1944). The history and mission of the church; an elective unit for young people, for use in church schools, institutes, assemblies, summer camps, and special study groups. New York: Abingdon-Cokesbury Press.
- Outler, Albert C. (1945). A Christian context for counseling. [New Haven, CT]: [Hazen Foundation].
- Outler, Albert C. (1948). Colleges, faculties and religion; an appraisal of the program of faculty consultations on religion in higher education, 1945-48. New Haven, CT: Hazen Foundation.
- Outler, Albert C. (1954). Psychotherapy and the Christian Message. New York: Harper & Bros.
- Saint, Augustine; Outler, Albert C. (1955). Augustine: Confessions and Enchiridion . Philadelphia: Westminster Press – via Wikisource.
- Harding, Arthur Leon; Outler, Albert C. (1955). Natural law and natural rights. Dallas: Southern Methodist University Press.
- Outler, Albert C. (1957). The Christian tradition and the unity we seek: given as Richard lectures at the University of Virginia in Charlottesville, Virginia. New York: Oxford University Press.
- Outler, Albert C. (1959). Quid est veritas?. [Washington]: Council of Protestant Colleges and Universities.
- Outler, Albert C. (1964). John Wesley. New York: Oxford University Press.
- Outler, Albert C. (1966). That the world may believe: guide for leaders of the Methodist mission study on Christian unity. New York: Joint Commission on Education and Cultivation, Board of Missions of the Methodist Church.
- Outler, Albert C. (1966). Called to unity: Methodism and church union. Cincinnati: Service Center, Board of Missions The Methodist Church.
- Outler, Albert C. (1966). Vatican II: charter for change.
- Outler, Albert C. (1967). Methodist observer at Vatican II. Westminster [Md.]: Newman Press.
- Outler, Albert C. (1968). Who trusts in God; musings on the meaning of providence. New York: Oxford University Press.
- Outler, Albert C.; Balás, David L (1968). The development of catholic Christianity: methodological papers. [Dallas, TX]: [publisher not identified]: Prof. Wm. David Kirkpatrick [distributor].
- Outler, Albert C.; Kiwiet, John J. (1969). Origen. [Fort Worth?]: [publisher not identified].
- Outler, Albert C. (1970). An interim report to the General Conference. [Place of publication not identified: [publisher not identified].
- Outler, Albert C. (1970). COCU: test case for ecumenism in America: lecture III, Crisis coming up. [Fort Worth, TX]: [Texas Christian University].
- Outler, Albert C.; Tyson, Joseph B. (1973). Canon (Scripture-Tradition). [Abilene, TX]: [publisher not identified].
- Outler, Albert C. (1973). History as an ecumenical resource: the Protestant discovery of tradition, 1952-1963. [Washington, D.C.]: [Catholic University of America Press].
- Outler, Albert C. (1971). Evangelism in the Wesleyan spirit. Nashville, TN: Tidings.
- Outler, Albert C.; Benson, Dennis C. (1973). Reconciliation: the function of the church. Pittsburgh: Thesis.
- Outler, Albert C. (1975). Theology in the Wesleyan spirit. Nashville, TN: Tidings.
- Outler, Albert C. (1975). The Bicentennial and the re-invention of America. Dallas: Greater Dallas Council of Churches.
- Outler, Albert C.; Deschner, John (1975). Our common history as Christians: essays in honour of Albert C. Outler. New York: Oxford University Press.
- Outler, Albert C.; Walther, James Arthur (1976). Reinventing America. Pittsburgh, PA: Thesis.
- Outler, Albert C.; Ferguson, Everett (1976). Reinventing America. [Dallas, TX]: [publisher not identified].
- Outler, Albert C.; Walker, William O (1978). The Relationships among the gospels: an interdisciplinary dialogue. San Antonio: Trinity University Press.
- Outler, Albert C. (1982). The rule of grace. Melbourne: Uniting Church Press.
- Outler, Albert C. (1984). Ecumenism in a postliberal age. Indianapolis, IN: Council on Christian Unity.
- Outler, Albert C. (1991). John Wesley's sermons: an introduction. Nashville: Abingdon Press.
- Outler, Albert C.; Oden, Thomas C. (1991). The Wesleyan theological heritage. Grand Rapids, MI: Zondervan Publishing House.
- Outler, Albert C. (1995). Parrott, Bob W. (ed.). The preacher. The Albert Outler library. Vol. 1. Anderson, IN: Bristol House.
- Outler, Albert C. (1995). Parrott, Bob W. (ed.). The churchman. The Albert Outler library. Vol. 2. Anderson, IN: Bristol House.
- Outler, Albert C. (1995). Parrott, Bob W. (ed.). The university professor. The Albert Outler library. Vol. 3. Anderson, IN: Bristol House.
- Outler, Albert C. (1995). Parrott, Bob W. (ed.). Christology. The Albert Outler library. Vol. 4. Anderson, IN: Bristol House.
- Outler, Albert C. (1995). Parrott, Bob W. (ed.). The pastoral psychology of Albert C. Outler. The Albert Outler library. Vol. 5. Anderson, IN: Bristol House.
- Outler, Albert C. (1995). Parrott, Bob W. (ed.). Evangelism. The Albert Outler library. Vol. 6. Anderson, IN: Bristol House.
- Outler, Albert C. (1995). Parrott, Bob W. (ed.). Ecumenical theologian: essays by Albert Cook Outler. The Albert Outler library. Vol. 7. Anderson, IN: Bristol House.
- Outler, Albert C. (1995). Parrott, Bob W. (ed.). Historian & interpreter of the Christian tradition. The Albert Outler library. Vol. 8. Anderson, IN: Bristol House.
- Outler, Albert C. (1995). Parrott, Bob W. (ed.). Outler on the Holy Spirit: the pneumatology of Albert Cook Oulter. The Albert Outler library. Vol. 9. Anderson, IN: Bristol House.
- Outler, Albert C.; Howe, Leroy T. (1997). The pastoral psychology of Albert C. Outler. Anderson, IN: Bristol House.

=== Articles ===
- Outler, Albert C. (1955). "Symposium: contemporary theological concern". Perkins School of Theology Journal. 8 (3).
- Outler, Albert C. (1960). "Ordeal of a Happy Dilettante". Christian Century.
- Outler, Albert C. (1967). "Dedication of the Sweet Briar Memorial Chapel, April 20-23, 1967". Sweet Briar College. 20 (7). Sweet Briar, Va.
- Outler, Albert C. (1977). ""The three chapters": a comment on the survival of antiochene Christology". Lutheran School of Theology at Chicago. Chicago.
- Outler, Albert C. (1980). "A Fund for 'Evangelical' Scholars". Christian Century: 138–140.
- Outler, Albert C. (1989). "Pneumatology as an Ecumenical Frontier". The Ecumenical Review. 41 (3): 363–374. doi:10.1111/j.1758-6623.1989.tb02589.x.
- Outler, Albert C. "Pietism and Enlightenment: alternatives to tradition". Christian Spirituality: Post-reformation and Modern / Edited by Louis Dupré and Don e. Saliers; in Collaborations with John Meyendorff.
