= Julius Samuel Scott Jr. =

American academic administrator, teacher, sociologist (1925–2019)

5th President of Paine College
- In office 1975–1982
- Preceded by: Lucius Holsey Pitts
- Succeeded by: William Hamilton Harris

7th President of Paine College
- In office 1988–1994
- Preceded by: William Hamilton Harris
- Succeeded by: Shirley A. R. Lewis

President of Wiley College
- In office 1996–1998
- Preceded by: Lamore J. Carter
- Succeeded by: Ronald L. Swain

Personal details
- Born: February 26, 1925 Houston, Texas, U.S.
- Died: August 1, 2019 (aged 94) Hilton Head Island, South Carolina, U.S.
- Spouse: Ianthia L. Harrell
- Children: 3, including Julius Sherrod Scott III
- Education: Wiley College, Boston University
- Occupation: Minister, chaplain, community leader, theologist, sociologist, teacher, academic administrator

Julius Samuel Scott Jr. (1925 – 2019) was an American Methodist minister, sociologist, community leader, teacher, and academic administrator. He served as presidents of Paine College (1975–1982; and 1988–1994) and Wiley College (1996–1998).

== Early life and education ==
Julius Samuel Scott, Jr. was born on February 26, 1925, in Houston, Texas to parents Julius S. Scott, Sr., and Bertha Bell Scott. His father, Julius Sr. (1885–1976) was a Methodist minister and served as the ninth president of Wiley College.

Scott Jr. attended Wiley College, where he graduated with degrees in sociology and religion. He continued his studies at Garrett–Evangelical Theological Seminary, and Brown University before earning a PhD in 1968 in social ethics at Boston University. He was interested in learning about non-violent protest, and study the teachings of Mahatma Gandhi; he moved to India for three years to work as a teacher and missionary in Hyderabad, India. Scott also held 14 honorary degrees.

== Career ==
He worked as a professor of sociology at Wiley College, Boston University, Atlanta University (now Clark Atlanta University), and Spelman College. He served as a chaplain at the Massachusetts Institute of Technology, Texas Southern University, and Brown University. In 1970, Scott was named executive director of the Martin Luther King Jr. Center for Nonviolent Social Change (now the King Center for Nonviolent Social Change) in Atlanta.

Scott served as president of Paine College from 1975 until 1982, and was asked to serve a second term from 1988 until 1994 because of his positive impact with rebuilding relations between Paine College and the white community in Augusta, Georgia.

Scott was one of the many founders of Africa University, a private Methodist institution in Zimbabwe which opened in 1992. Africa University opened with 40 students, and by 2019 the school had over 1,500 students.

Starting in 1996, Scott served as president of Wiley College in Marshall, Texas, a role he held until 1998. Additionally he served as a board member at the United Negro College Fund, the National Association of Independent Colleges and Universities, and the University Senate of the United Methodist Church.

== Death and legacy ==
He died on August 1, 2009 in Hilton Head Island. He was survived by his wife Ianthia "Ann" L. Harrell, and their three children.
