= George T. French Jr. =

American university president

George French
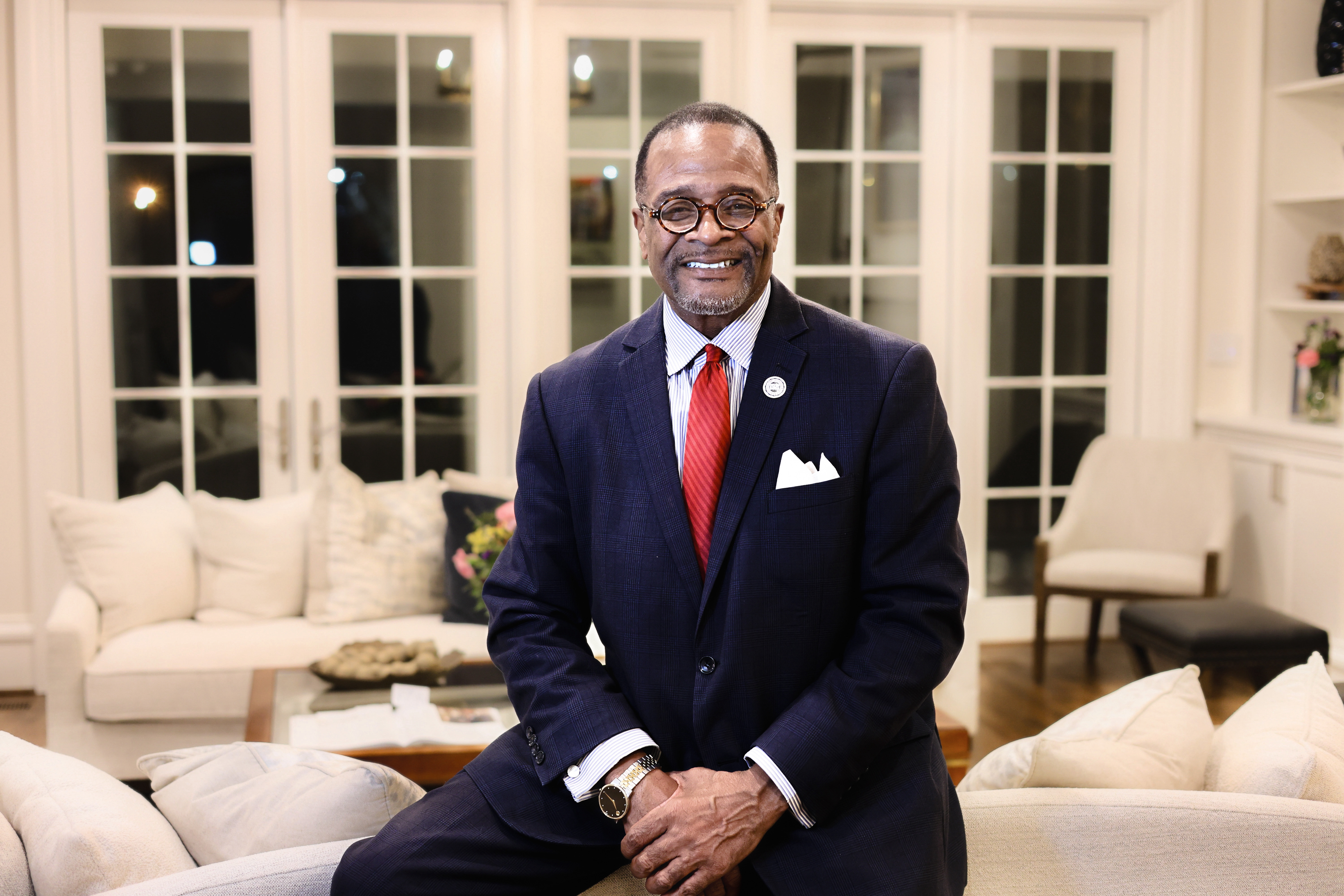

5th President of Clark Atlanta University
- Incumbent
- Assumed office September 2019
- Preceded by: Lucille Maugé

14th President of Miles College
- In office October 2005 – August 2019
- Preceded by: Albert Sloan
- Succeeded by: Bobbie Knight

Personal details
- Born: November 1961 (age 64) Louisville, Kentucky
- Education: University of Louisville (BA); University of Richmond (JD); Jackson State University (PhD)

George T. French Jr. is an American academic administrator and university president. He is the fifth president of Clark Atlanta University in downtown Atlanta, serving since September 2019. He previously served as the 14th president of Miles College from October 2005 until August 2019.

== Education ==
French earned a BA in political science from the University of Louisville and attended the University of Richmond School of Law for two years, but left Richmond when Miles College recruited him to serve as its director of development. French later earned his JD at Miles Law School and his PhD in higher education from Jackson State University.
