= Bobbie Knight =

15th President of Miles College
- Incumbent
- Assumed office August 2019
- Other names: Bobbie Knight Burley
- Preceded by: George T. French Jr.

Personal details
- Spouse: Gary Burley
- Education: University of Alabama, Birmingham School of Law, Northwestern University
- Occupation: Businessperson, academic administrator, college president

Bobbie Knight is an American businessperson, academic administrator and college president. She is the 15th president of Miles College a HBCU in Fairfield, Alabama. Knight, who had been a trustee of Miles College since July 2017, was appointed interim president of the school in August 2019, following the resignation of George French Jr. and she was selected as the permanent president six months later.

== Biography ==
Knight has a B.S. degree from the University of Alabama at Tuscaloosa; and a J.D. degree from the Birmingham School of Law. She is also a graduate of Northwestern University’s Kellogg School of Management.

She spent 37 years working for Alabama Power Company, including in roles as vice president of the Birmingham Division, vice president of public relations, and general manager of supply chain. She retired from the power company in 2016.

Knight is married to Gary Burley, a former professional football player.
