= Paine College =

Historically black college in Augusta, Georgia, US

Coordinates: 33.469487°N 81.993402°W

- Paine College Seal
- Former name: Paine Institute (1882–1903)
- Motto: "Emerging Anew"
- Type: Private historically black college
- Established: November 1, 1882
- Religious affiliation: United Methodist Church, Christian Methodist Episcopal Church
- President: Lester McCorn
- Students: 241 (2023)
- Location: Augusta, Georgia, United States
- Campus: Urban 64.4-acre (260,617.6 m^{2})
- Colors: Purple and white
- Nickname: Lions
- Sporting affiliations: NCCAA
- Website: www.paine.edu

Paine College is a private, historically black Methodist college in Augusta, Georgia. It is affiliated with the United Methodist Church and Christian Methodist Episcopal Church. Paine College offers undergraduate degrees in the liberal arts, business administration, and education through residential, commuter, and off-site programs. The college is accredited by the Transnational Association of Christian Colleges and Schools (TRACS).

== History ==
=== Early history ===
Bishop Lucius Henry Holsey started planning for the school in 1869, and asked for leadership help through Methodist Episcopal Church South (MECS). The new school was named after the late Bishop Robert Paine. Paine College was founded on November 1, 1882 by the Colored Methodist Episcopal Church (now Christian Methodist Episcopal Church, a historically black denomination), and the Methodist Episcopal Church South (now United Methodist Church, a historically white denomination). According to The Augusta Chronicle, "The Paine College Board of Trustees is the oldest interracial body in the nation".

The first president was Morgan Callaway, who worked hard for fundraising. Classes started in 1884 in a rented space at 10th and Broad Street in Augusta, and in 1886 Paine was moved to its current location, which at the time was rural land outside of the city. It also functioned as a high school until 1945, when the first public high school opened for African Americans in Augusta.

=== Finances and accreditation revoked (2016–2018) ===
The college is experiencing financial issues and had its regional accreditation revoked by the Southern Association of Colleges and Schools (SACS) in 2016.

In November 2015, following an initial recommendation from SACS to revoke its accreditation, Paine College launched the "Build it Back Campaign", which raised over half a million dollars in six months. This was to support its fundraising goal of $3.5 million, of which $2.5 million in cash was raised. The college plans to use the money to offset the debt of $5.4 million. Following a March 2016 onsite visit, SACS found the college in compliance with one of the standards that was previously problematic, leaving a total of three standards in question: financial resources, financial stability, and control of sponsored research/external funds. In May, the college celebrated meeting its fundraising goal. However, one month later SACS recommended that the college lose its regional accreditation. The college unsuccessfully appealed to the accreditor and federal courts.

The college subsequently applied for and was granted candidate status with the Transnational Association of Christian Colleges and Schools (TRACS) in 2018.

== Presidents ==
- Morgan Callaway, 1882–1884
- George Williams Walker, 1884–1911
- John D. Hammond, 1911–1915
- Albert Deems Betts, 1917–1921
- Ray Silver Tomlin (interim), 1921–1923
- Ray Silver Tomlin, 1923–1929
- Edmund Clarke Peters, 1929–1956
- E. Clayton Calhoun, 1956–1970
- Lucius Holsey Pitts, 1971–1974
- Julius Samuel Scott Jr., 1975–1982
- William Hamilton Harris, 1982–1988
- Julius Samuel Scott Jr., 1988–1994
- Shirley A. R. Lewis, 1994–2007
- George C. Bradley, 2007–2014
- Samuel Sullivan (interim), 2014
- Samuel Sullivan, 2016–2017
- Jerry L. Hardee, 2017–2019
- Cheryl Evans Jones, 2019–2025
- Lester McCorn, 2025–present

== Campus ==
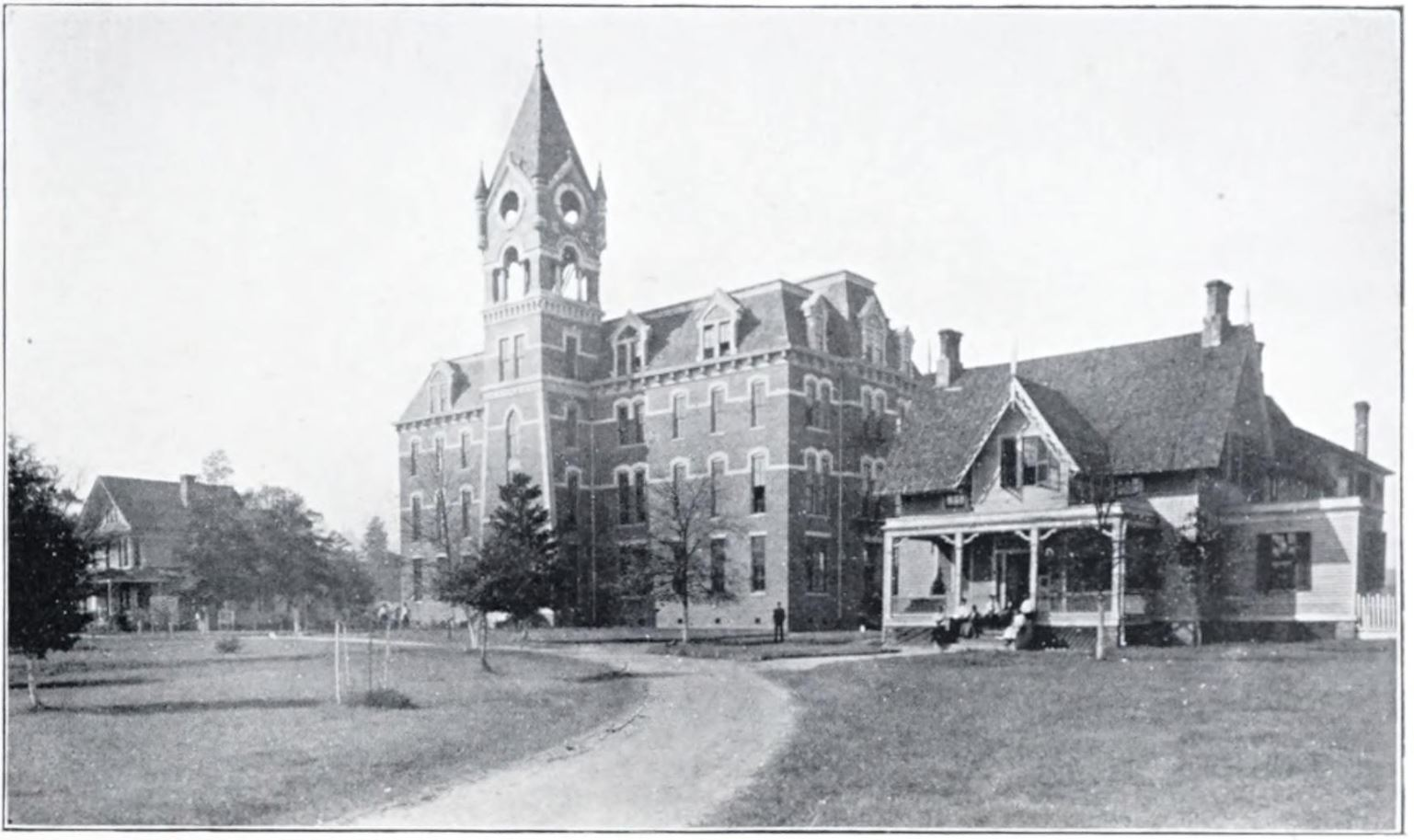
The campus, c. 1910, Haygood Memorial Hall and the president's residence

Paine College has a 64.4-acre (260,617.6 m^{2}) campus in the heart of Augusta. Most of its buildings, including residence halls, classroom buildings, and the library, are located in the main campus area. The athletic field, gymnasium, tennis court, and the chapel/music building are included in the rear campus area. The Collins-Calloway Library and Resources Center houses the Paine College Digital Collections, which feature historical images of Paine College and oral history interviews of Paine College alumni and presidents.

A historic district within the campus was listed on the National Register of Historic Places on December 26, 2012, for its contributions to education and African-American heritage.

== Athletics ==
Paine College's athletic teams are nicknamed as the Lions. The college currently competes as a member of the National Christian Collegiate Athletic Association (NCCAA). Men's sports include baseball and basketball; women's sports include basketball, softball, and volleyball.

Paine formerly competed in the Division II level of the National Collegiate Athletic Association (NCAA), primarily in the Southern Intercollegiate Athletic Conference (SIAC) from 1985–86 to 2020–21.

The college's football team was dropped after the 1963 season, but returned to play in 2014. In their first season back, the football team finished 2–8 before the program was again shut down.

== Notable alumni ==
This is a list of notable alumni of Paine Institute and/or Paine College.

Name	Class year	Notability	Reference(s)
William Augustus Bell	1906	president of Miles College in Alabama for two terms	
John Wesley Gilbert	1886	first African-American archaeologist	
Emma R. Gresham	1953	mayor of Keysville, Georgia (1985–2005) and the second African American female to be elected as a chief official in Georgia	
Louis Lomax	1942	journalist, first African American to appear on television as a newsman	
Joseph Lowery		president of the Southern Christian Leadership Conference 1977–1997	
Mike Thurmond	1975	attorney and first African-American elected as Georgia Labor Commissioner	
Channing Tobias	1902	civil rights activist and appointee on the President's Committee on Civil Rights	
Pastor Troy		rapper	
Woodie W. White	1958	bishop of the United Methodist Church	
Frank Yerby	1937	author and film writer	

== See also ==
- List of historically black colleges and universities
