= Teresa E. Jefferson-Snorton =

American bishop of Christian Methodist Episcopal Church

Bishop Teresa Elaine Snorton
- Presiding Bishop
- Diocese: Ecumenical Bishop and Development Officer for the Christian Methodist Episcopal Church
- Installed: 2011
- Predecessor: Bishop Wallace Edward Lockett

Orders
- Consecration: June 30, 2010

Personal details
- Born: 1955 (age 70–71) Kentucky
- Denomination: Christian Methodist Episcopal
- Residence: Alabama
- Occupation: Clergy
- Education: DMin.
- Alma mater: United Theological Seminary (Ohio)

Teresa Elaine Snorton (born 1955) is an American bishop in the Christian Methodist Episcopal Church. She became the first woman to be elevated to the episcopate in her denomination, when she was elected as the 59th CME bishop in 2010. From 2011 to 2022 she was the presiding bishop for the fifth episcopal district, which has oversight of CME churches in Alabama and Florida. In 2022 she was appointed as the church’s ecumenical and development officer. She is the ecumenical officer and the endorsing agent for the CME church. She also serves as the president of Churches Uniting in Christ, and on the steering committee for the World Methodist Council.

== Biography ==
Teresa Elaine Snorton was born in 1955 in Kentucky. Her family was active in the Christian Episcopal Methodist Church, an historically African American denomination founded in 1870. Her father was a pastor, as was her uncle. Her grandmother was a missionary and her great-grandfather had also been CME pastor. Her sisters would later grow up to be pastors as well.

Jefferson-Snorton earned a B.A. from Vanderbilt University in Nashville, and then completed a Master of Divinity at Louisville Presbyterian Theological Seminary in 1982. She also earned a Master of Theology from Southern Baptist Theological Seminary. She completed a Doctor of Ministry degree at Union Theological Seminary in Ohio.

After being ordained to the ministry, she briefly pastored a church in Kentucky in the 1980s and worked in Louisville as a psychiatric staff chaplain.

Moving to Atlanta, from 1990 to 2000, she served as executive director of the Emory University Center for Pastoral Services, and taught as an adjunct faculty member. In 2000, she became the Executive Director for the Association for Clinical Pastoral Education, where she served for twelve years. She co-edited Women Out of Order: Risking Change and Creating Care in a Multicultural World, published in 2009. From 1991 to 2010, she taught pastoral care at Emory University's Candler School of Theology. She has also taught at Virginia Commonwealth University, and the School of Theology at Virginia Union University.

In 2010, she ran for bishop, which is an elected position in the CME Church. She was one of 36 people running for four open positions as bishop, and the only woman candidate. She was elected at the third-six-quadrennial gathering of the church, held in Mobile, Alabama. On June 30, 2010, she was consecrated as the 59th bishop in the CME Church. She was appointed to the Eleventh Episcopal District, which includes churches in Africa. After the death of Bishop Wallace Edward Lockett, who died suddenly in 2011 while traveling, Bishop Jefferson-Snorton was appointed as the Presiding Bishop of the Fifth Episcopal District.

Bishop Jefferson-Snorton has been very involved in commissions and committees in the CME Church and in ecumenical organizations. She served eight years on the Commission on the Concerns of Women in Ministry. She also serves on the Steering Committee and as the chair for the Family Life Committee for the World Methodist Council. She is president of Churches Uniting in Christ, an ecumenical effort to build Christian unity, and serves on the Central Committee of the World Council of Churches.

In 2022, she became the first woman to give the Episcopal Address to the General Conference of the denomination.

== Awards ==
In 2001, Jefferson-Snorton received the Wayne E. Oates Award from the Oates Institute in Louisville, Kentucky. The award was created in 1989, to honor individuals in the field of pastoral care and spirituality. She also received the CME Chaplain of the Year Award.

== See also ==
- Women's ordination
- Jerena Lee
- Vashti Murphy McKenzie
