= Miles College =

Historically black college in Fairfield, Alabama, US

- Former name: Miles Memorial College (1898–1941)
- Motto: Sapientia et Pax et Amor Omnibus
- Motto in English: Wisdom and Peace and Love for all.
- Type: Private historically black college
- Established: 1898
- Religious affiliation: CME Church
- Academic affiliations: Southern Intercollegiate Athletic Conference
- President: Bobbie Knight
- Administrative staff: 135
- Students: 1,151
- Location: Fairfield, Alabama, U.S. 33°28′50″N 86°54′32″W
- Campus: 76 acres (310,000 m^{2})
- Colors: Purple & gold
- Nickname: Golden Bears
- Sporting affiliations: NCAA Division II – SIAC
- Mascot: The Golden Bear
- Website: miles.edu
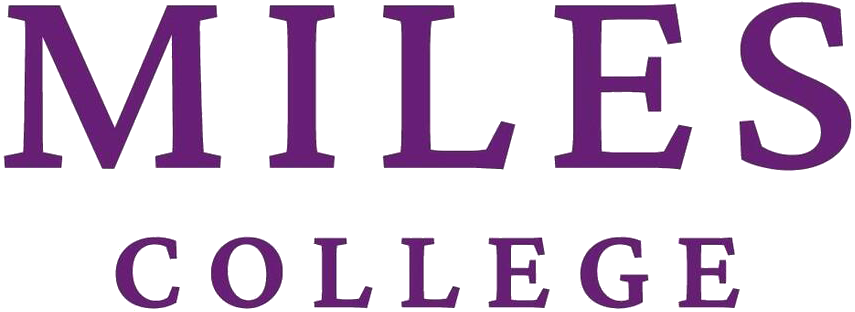
- Miles Memorial College Historic District
- U.S. National Register of Historic Places
- U.S. Historic district
- Alabama Register of Landmarks and Heritage
- Location within Alabama Location within the United States
- Area: 76 acres (31 ha)
- Built: 1907
- Architect: Tisdale, Stone & Patton; Gilreath Construction
- Architectural style: Bungalow/Craftsman, Beaux Arts
- NRHP reference No.: 93001031

Significant dates
- Added to NRHP: January 3, 1994
- Designated ARLH: March 19, 1993

Miles College is a private historically black college in Fairfield, Alabama. Founded in 1898, it is associated with the Christian Methodist Episcopal Church (CME Church) and a member of the United Negro College Fund.

== History ==
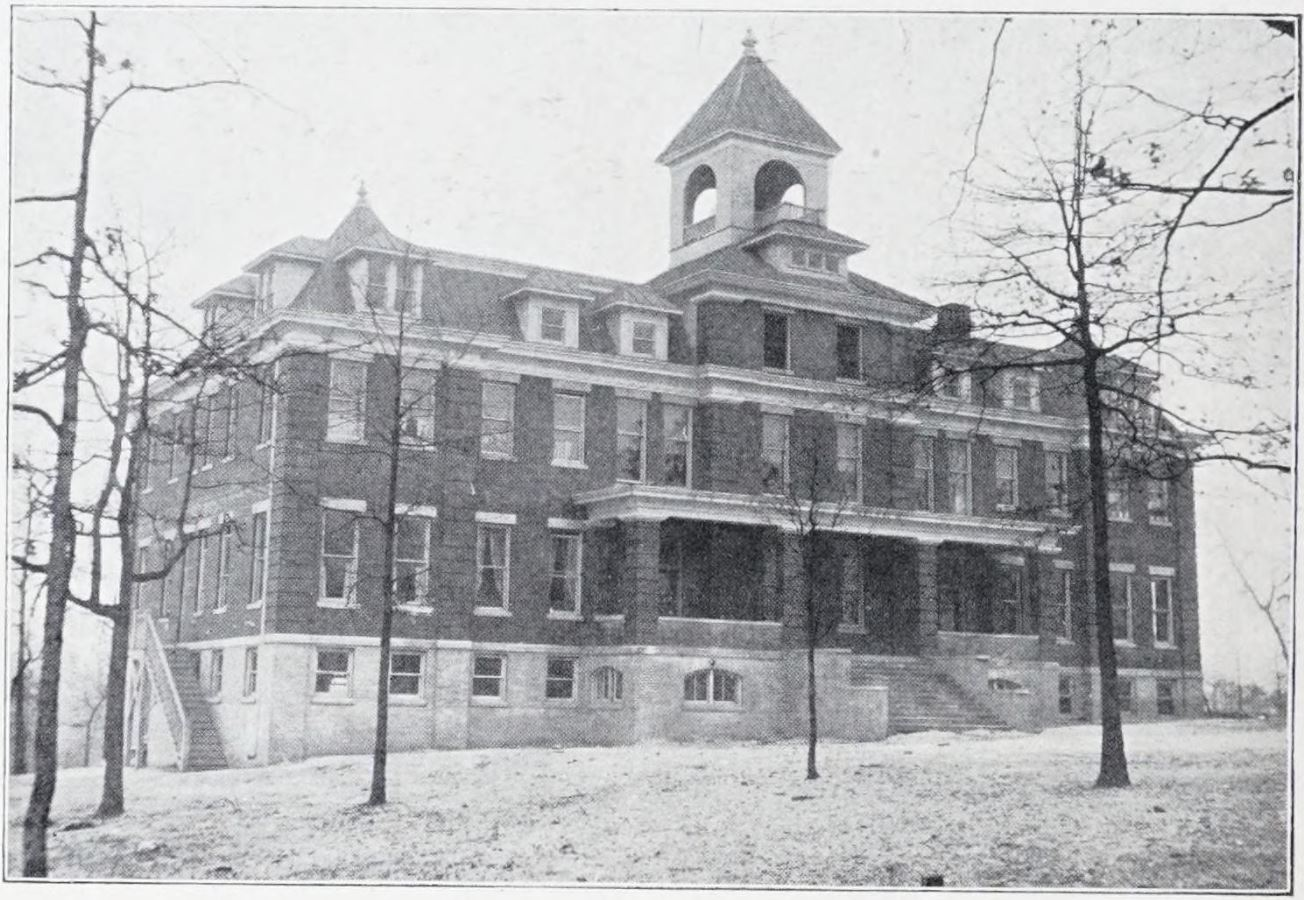
The college, c. 1910

Miles College began organization efforts in 1893 and was founded in 1898 by the Colored Methodist Episcopal Church (now the Christian Methodist Episcopal Church). It was chartered as Miles Memorial College in honor of Bishop William H. Miles. Miles was born enslaved in Kentucky and was later freed (although sources disagree on the date). In 1911, the Miles College awarded its first bachelor's degrees.

It was originally housed in the former Booker City High School campus in Booker City, Alabama. In 1907, the college moved from Booker City to its present campus in Fairfield, Alabama, roughly six miles west of downtown Birmingham.

The school was able to survive the Great Depression with the help of two term college president, William Augustus Bell. In 1941 the name was changed from Miles Memorial College to Miles College.

=== Modern history ===
In January 2020, Charles Barkley, who is an Alabama native, donated $1 million to Miles College, under first female President Dr. Bobbie Knight. Barkley's gift is the biggest donation from a single person that the school has ever received. Dr. Knight said the donation will kickstart efforts to raise $100 million.

== Presidents ==
- L. L. Wilson, –1904
- R. S. Williams, –1907
- James Albert Bray, 1907–1912
- William Augustus Bell, 1912–1913
- John Wesley Gilbert, 1913–1914
- George A. Payne, 1914–1918
- Robert T. Brown, 1918–1922
- George L. Word, 1922–1926
- Mack Burley, 1926–1931
- Brooks Dickens, 1931–1936
- William Augustus Bell, 1936–1961
- Lucius Holsey Pitts, 1961–1971
- W. Clyde Williams, 1971–1986
- Leroy Johnson, 1986–1989
- Albert Sloan, 1989–2005
- George T. French Jr., 2006–August 31, 2019
- Bobbie Knight (interim), August 1, 2019–March 5, 2020
- Bobbie Knight, March 5, 2020– present

== Academics ==
Miles is accredited by the Commission on Colleges of the Southern Association of Colleges and Schools for the awarding of baccalaureate degrees and approved by the Alabama State Department of Education. Its social work program is accredited by the Council of Social Work Education. Miles College offers 25 bachelor's degrees in the following divisions: Business and Accounting, Communications, Education, Humanities, Natural Sciences and Mathematics, and Social and Behavioral Sciences. Miles College is one of 41 schools in the nation with a Center of Academic Excellence under the office of the Director of National Intelligence.

Miles offers 28 bachelor's degree programs in six academic divisions to an enrollment of approximately 1,700 students and also offers an honors program for undergraduate students with exceptional academic records.

== Campus ==
Miles College purchased the Lloyd Noland Hospital site, which more than doubled the size of the campus. The college completed the construction of a new student activity and dining center, a new welcome and admissions center, and a new 204 bed residence hall. Part of the campus is listed on the National Register of Historic Places.

Sloan Alumni Stadium, named after the college's 13th president, Albert J. H. Sloan II, was recently expanded to include a $1 million Environ-Turf field.

After Birmingham-Southern College closed in 2024, Miles entered into an agreement to buy its former campus, but in November after Miles missed deadlines to complete the sale, Birmingham-Southern chose to pursue other purchasers. Miles stated it still desires to buy the campus.

== Student activities ==
Organizations for students include the Student Government Association, Honors Curriculum, academic clubs, religious organizations, National Pan-Hellenic Council organizations, general interest clubs, a gospel choir, and a concert choir.

=== Radio station ===
The school operated a radio station, WMWI FM 88.7. It was established in 2009 and was licensed to serve Demopolis, Alabama. It went off the air in 2019 and its license was cancelled in December 2023.

=== Marching band ===
The Miles College band is known as the Purple Marching Machine (PMM). The Purple Marching Machine was established in 1996, under the direction of Prof. Arthur Means, Jr. There are nearly 200 members in the band now and it is under the direction of Willie Snipes Jr. PMM has performed at the Macy's Thanksgiving Day Parade, numerous battle of the bands, and for the Atlanta Falcons. PMM is accompanied by the Golden Stars danceline and Steaming Flags color guard.

=== Athletics ===
The Miles College athletics program competes in the NCAA Division II's Southern Intercollegiate Athletic Conference (SIAC). The program has men's and women's sports that include: basketball, football, volleyball, track, baseball, softball, cross country, and golf. Their nickname is the Golden Bears.

== Notable alumni ==
- Richard Arrington Jr., first African-American Mayor of the City of Birmingham
- U. W. Clemon, first African-American federal judge in the State of Alabama
- Autherine Lucy, first African-American to attend the University of Alabama
- Pollie Anne Myers Pinkins, civil rights activist
- Fred Horn, politician, former member of the Alabama House of Representatives
- Vince Hill, American football player
- Juandalynn Givan, politician, member of the Alabama House of Representatives
- Thales McReynolds, former NBA player
- Bennett M. Stewart, former Democratic U.S. Representative from Illinois
- Paul A. G. Stewart, 50th Bishop of the Christian Methodist Episcopal Church and Vice Chairperson of Board of Trustees Miles College
- Cleopatra Tucker, politician, who has served in the New Jersey General Assembly since 2008

== Notable faculty and staff ==
- John U. Monro, director of freshman studies at Miles College; former dean of Harvard College
- Sam Shade, professional football player and college football coach
- Steven Whitman, public health researcher

== See also ==
- List of historically black colleges of the United States
- Miles Law School
