= Release International =

Organization for monitoring persecution of Christians

Release International is an international Christian ministry, based in the UK, which seeks to support Christians around the world who are persecuted for their faith.

The ministry is active in around 30 countries, working through local Christian partners to provide both spiritual resources and practical support to victims of persecution. This includes prayerfully, pastorally and practically helping:

- The families of Christian martyrs
- Prisoners of Faith and their families
- Christians suffering oppression and violence
- Christians forced to flee.

On its website Release International states that it subscribes to the Evangelical Alliance Statement of Faith.

== History ==
Release International was established in 1968, originally as Christian Mission to the Communist World. It is one of a number of Christian organisations around the world that traces its origins and inspiration to Richard Wurmbrand, a Romanian pastor who spent a total of 14 years in Communist prisons, from the late 1940s to the mid-1960s.

Wurmbrand documented his prison sufferings in the international best-selling book, Tortured for Christ, which also called on Christians in the free West to respond to the needs of those who were suffering for their Christian faith.

The ministry changed its name to Release International in 1992.

== Activities ==
In the UK Release International expresses its support for persecuted Christians around the world by:

- Raising their VOICE
- Giving them the TOOLS they need to live for Jesus Christ
- Calling UK Christians into FELLOWSHIP with them
- Learning lessons of Christian DISCIPLESHIP with them, and
- Maintaining Christian STEWARDSHIP to honour them.

Release International publishes a free quarterly magazine called Voice, which seeks to inform and to resource UK Christians to pray for those who are persecuted.
