= Elizabeth Stuart (theologian) =

The Reverend Elizabeth Stuart MBE
- Born: 1962 (age 63–64)
- Occupation: Vice-chancellor
- Known for: Chosen: Gay Catholic Priests Tell Their Stories; Just Good Friends: Towards A Lesbian And Gay Theology Of Relationships; People of Passion: What the Churches Teach about Sex; Religion Is A Queer Thing: A Guide to the Christian Faith for Lesbian, Gay, Bisexual, and Transgender

Academic background
- Education: Oxford University (PhD)

Academic work
- Discipline: Theology
- Institutions: University of Winchester
- Main interests: Queer Theology

Elizabeth Bridget Stuart MBE (born 1963) is a British theologian specialising in Queer Theology.

== Academic positions ==
Stuart is Professor of Christian Theology at the University of Winchester and was founding chair of the Centre for the Study of Christianity and Sexuality. She is the founding editor of the academic journal Theology and Sexuality. In August 2008 she took up the position of pro vice-chancellor, academic. In 2011, she became the senior pro vice-chancellor at the University of Winchester. In 2013 she was appointed deputy vice-chancellor. On 1 April 2021, Stuart became vice-chancellor of the University of Winchester succeeding Joy Carter.

She was appointed a Member of the Order of the British Empire (MBE) in the 2024 New Year Honours for services to higher education.

== Ordained ministry ==
Stuart was consecrated as a bishop in the Open Episcopal Church, a small, independent grouping within the United Kingdom. In 2006 she became archbishop of the Province of Great Britain and Ireland of the Liberal Catholic Church International. She retired in 2016 and was replaced by the Reverend Angie McLachlan.

Having trained with the South Central Theological Education Institution, Stuart was ordained in the Church of England as a deacon in 2019 and as a priest in 2020. Since 2019, she has been a non-stipendiary minister and associate priest of the Parish of St Matthew with St Paul in the Diocese of Winchester. Since 2023, she has been an honorary canon of Winchester Cathedral; she is also non-executive member of its cathedral chapter.

== Published writings ==
Stuart's published writings include:

- Gay and Lesbian Theologies: Repetitions and Critical Difference
- Just Good Friends: Towards a Lesbian and Gay Theology of Relationships
- Daring to Speak Love’s Name
- Religion is a Queer Thing

These works show Stuart moving from a liberationist approach to an approach grounded in queer theory. She now argues that gender and sexuality are not matters of ultimate theological concerns and that the Christian duty is to refuse to work theologically with such categories.

Jeffrey John argued against the model proposed in Just Good Friends in his booklet Permanent, Faithful, Stable: Christian Same-Sex Partnerships.

In 2008, Stuart received the Lesbian and Gay Christian Movement Award for "energetic and prophetic advocacy on behalf of LGBT people, numerous pioneering theological books, and for remaining a loyal member of LGCM".

In 2008 the French academic Stephane Lavignotte published a book about Stuart's theology: Au-delà du lesbien et du mâle: la subversion des identités dans la théologie 'queer' d'Elizabeth Stuart (published by Van Dieren).

== Personal life ==
Her grandfather was Ronald Niel Stuart VC.
