= William H. Miles =

American bishop

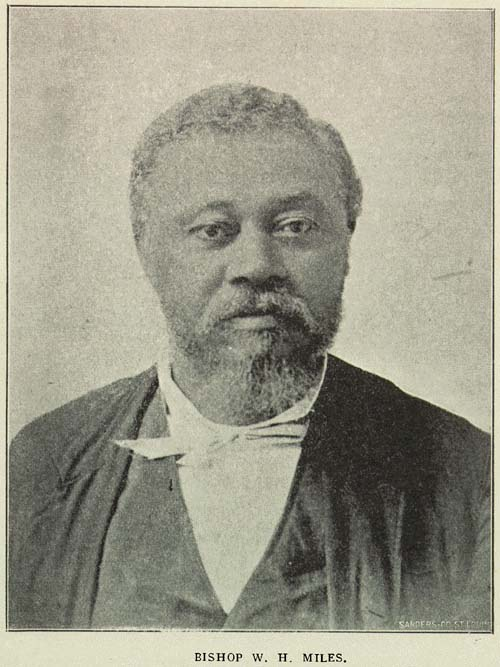
Photograph of Bishop William Henry Miles (1828–1892), a founder of the Christian Methodist Episcopal Church

William Henry Miles (1828–1892) was a founder and the first senior bishop of the Christian Methodist Episcopal Church in America, a Methodist denomination formed in 1870 to serve African-American Methodists in the American South. Miles College in Birmingham, Alabama is named in his honor.

== Life ==
Miles was born in Springfield, Kentucky. He was a slave of Mrs. Mary Miles; when she died in 1854, she willed William his freedom (although he was not freed until 1864).

== Images ==
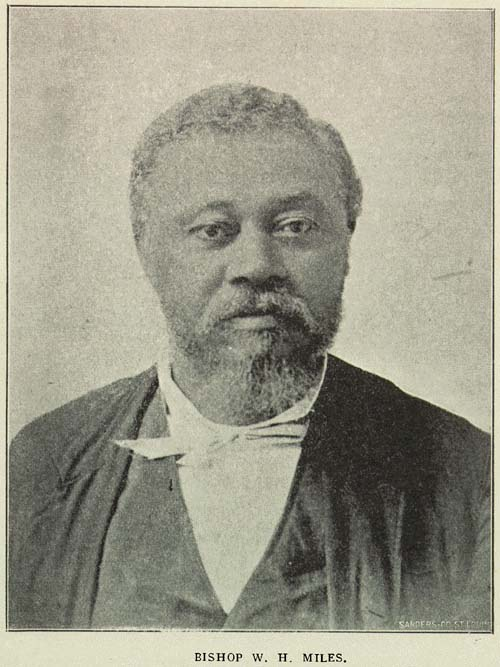
An undated photograph of Bishop William H. Miles published in 1916.

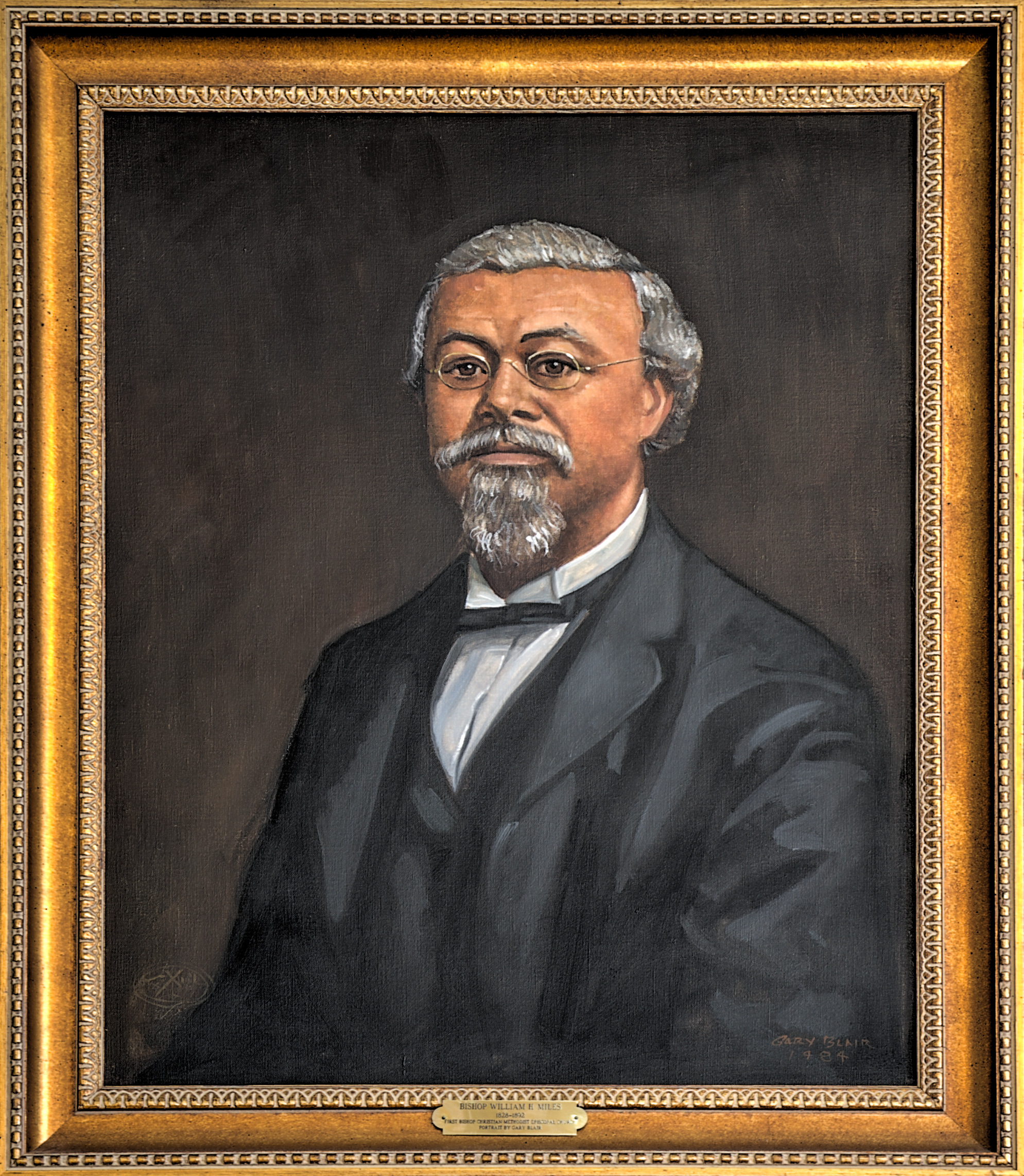
Painting of Miles on display at the World Methodist Museum, Lake Junaluska, NC
