= Staccato Powell =

American clergy (born 1959)

Staccato Powell (born 1959) is an American clergy member of the African Methodist Episcopal Zion Church (AME Zion). He is the former Bishop in the AME Zion Church serving the West Coast (or Western Episcopal District). He is a member of Omega Psi Phi fraternity incorporated where he served as Grand chaplain over the fraternity.

He is from Wake Forest, North Carolina. In 2016, Powell and Sheila Quintana, the former Vallejo High School Principal, created the entity "Western Episcopal District, Inc.", after Powell was made Bishop. The indictment alleged that Powell and Quintana conspired to defraud AME Zion Church congregations of roughly $14 million in the California cities of Palo Alto, Oakland, San Jose, and Los Angeles by illegally re-deeding these church properties. On January 25, 2022, Powell was charged with conspiracy and wire fraud. In April 2025, Quintana pleaded guilty, and Powell’s case is still pending.
