= International Council of Community Churches =

American Christian denomination (1950-)

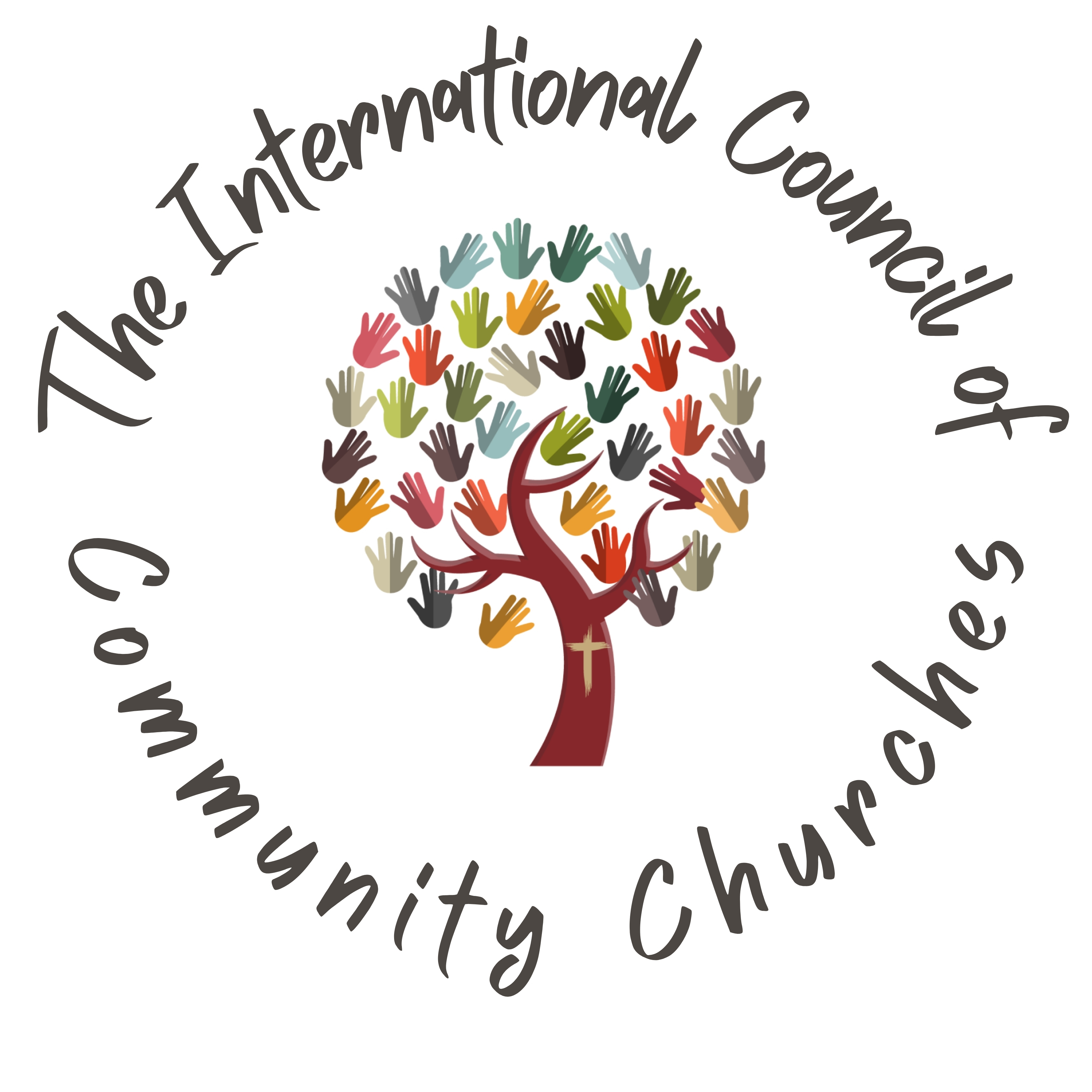
Logo of the International Council of Community Churches.

The International Council of Community Churches (ICCC) is a Christian religious association of ecumenically co-operating Protestants and Independent Catholics. Based in Loudon, TN in the United States, it is the main organization of the Community Church movement. The ICCC is a member of Churches Uniting in Christ, the National Council of Churches of Christ in the USA and the World Council of Churches. In 2010, the ICCC had 148 congregations with 68,300 members. Membership is concentrated primarily in the Midwest. However, there are several congregations in California, New York, and Florida. According to the World Council of Churches, the council has 108,806 members worldwide.

== History ==
In 1950, the biennial council of the Peoples Church of Christ and Community Centers led by Joseph M. Evans (until then all Afro-American) and the National Council of Community Churches led by the Rev. Roy A. Burkhardt (until then all Caucasian) joined in a historic merger. At the time, their joining represented the largest interracial merger of religious bodies in America. The new creation was the International Council of Community Churches. Member churches united to be a fellowship of ecumenically minded, freedom-loving congregations cooperating in fulfilling the mission of the church in the world. As a post-denominational movement, the council has witnessed and worked for Christian unity, justice and reconciliation in human society.

== Polity ==
Local congregations own the council and determine its emphases and operation. They do so by sending delegates to an annual conference. Each local church is entitled to two voting delegates, of which both may be laity or one each lay and clergy (but not two clergy.) Decisions about council policy are made by the local church delegates voting at the annual conference. Delegates elect a volunteer board. The board hires and supervises staff and oversees everyday operations. The Rev. Bruce N. Merton is the current executive director. The president is the Rev. Robert Fread.

== Leadership and Committees ==
The International Council of Community Churches (ICCC) is overseen by an elected Board of Directors and a small staff that support its operations. As of 2025–2026, the ICCC’s Board officers include President Janet Millben Burch, Vice-President Dorothy Campbell Gardner, Treasurer Nicholas Brame, Secretary Gail Fleeman, Member-at-Large (Presidential Assistant) Jerry Brown, and Member-at-Large (Vice-Presidential Assistant) Hare Varnon. The staff includes Executive Director Rev. Dr. Bruce N. Merton and part-time Administrator DeAnn Bath.

The ICCC also maintains a number of auxiliaries and ministry teams that support its mission and shared life. These include the Women’s Christian Fellowship; the Samaritans auxiliary; the Ministerium; and several ministry teams focused on areas such as stewardship, membership services, and ecumenical and interfaith relationships. The Ecumenical and Interfaith Relationships Ministry Team is moderated by Rock Fremont Jr.

== Constitution and bylaws ==
The ICCC use a constitution and bylaws to help govern the operation of the annual conference. These were last amended in 2025.

== Theology ==
The International Council of Community Churches (ICCC) describes its central theological principle as “unity without uniformity.” This phrase reflects the council’s conviction that Christian fellowship is grounded in unity in Jesus Christ rather than in uniform agreement on doctrine, polity, or liturgical practice. Member congregations of the ICCC—many of which come from Congregationalist, Baptist, Presbyterian, Methodist, and independent traditions—retain freedom of conscience and diversity of expression while affirming a shared commitment to the Gospel. This emphasis allows for a broad range of worship styles, theological perspectives, and cultural practices within the council. As an active participant in the World Council of Churches, the National Council of Churches, and Churches Uniting in Christ, the ICCC promotes an ecumenical vision in which churches cooperate in mission and ministry while maintaining their distinctive identities.

== See also ==
- Churches Uniting in Christ
- The World Council of Churches
- The Association for Religion Data Archives
