= Christian Methodist Episcopal Church =

American Methodist denomination

- Abbreviation: CME Church
- Classification: Protestant
- Orientation: Methodist
- Theology: Wesleyan-Arminian
- Polity: Connexionalism
- Origin: 1870; 156 years ago Jackson, Tennessee
- Separated from: Methodist Episcopal Church, South
- Members: 1.2 million
- Official website: thecmechurch.org

The Christian Methodist Episcopal Church (CME Church) is a Methodist denomination that is based in the United States. It adheres to Wesleyan-Arminian theology. Though historically a part of the black church, the Christian Methodist Episcopal church membership has evolved to include all racial backgrounds.

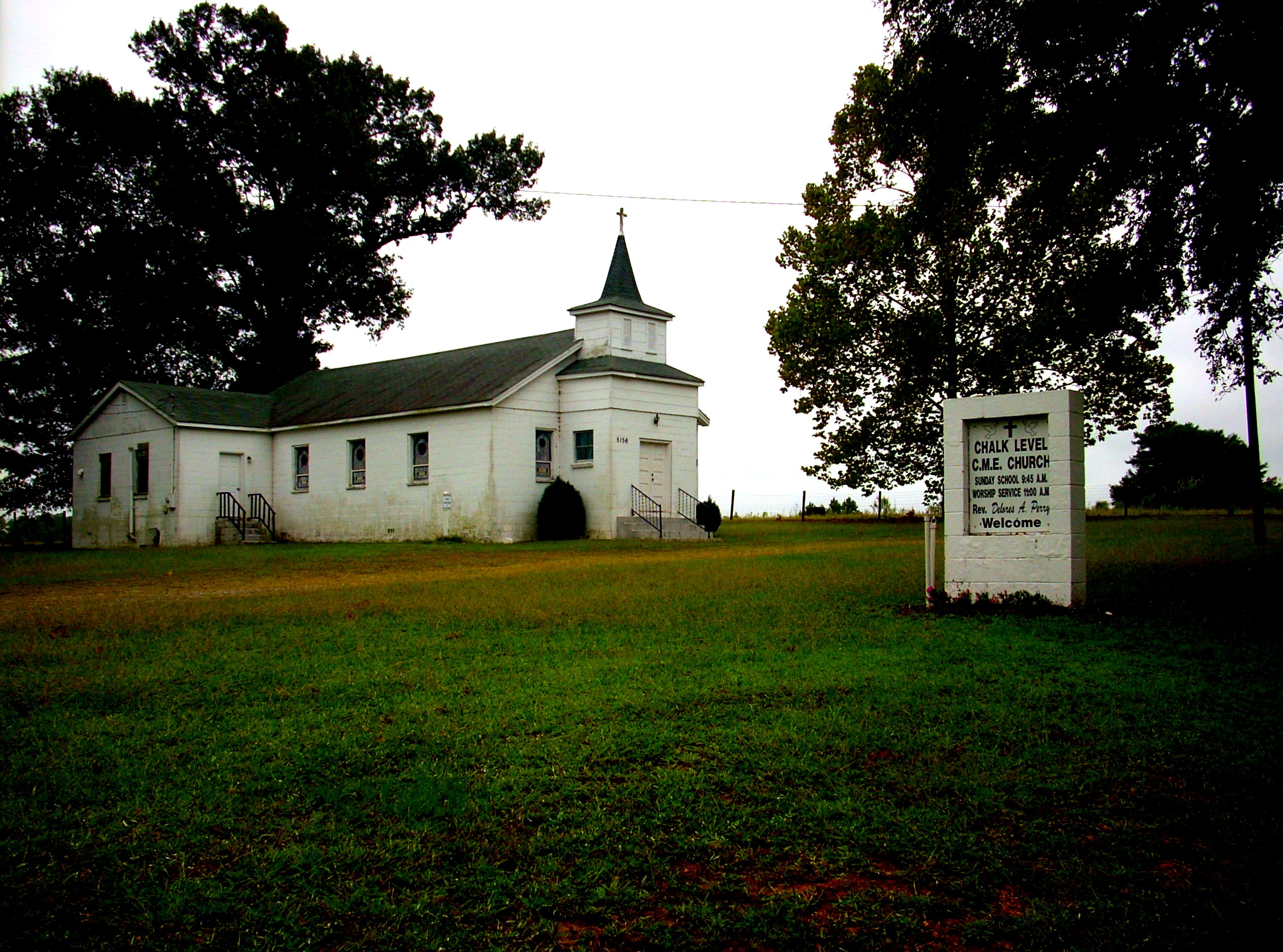
Chalk Level C.M.E. Church in Harnett County, North Carolina

== History ==
The CME Church was organized on December 16, 1870, in Jackson, Tennessee, by 41 former enslaved congregants, with the full support of their white sponsors in their former Methodist Episcopal Church, South. They met to form an organization that would allow them to establish and maintain their own polity. They ordained their own bishops and ministers without their being officially endorsed or appointed by the white-dominated body. They called this fellowship the Colored Methodist Episcopal Church in America. The church used this name until 1954, when successors adopted the C.M.E.C. name.

== Organization ==
In the Christian Methodist Episcopal Church, bishops are the Chief Officers and are elected by "delegate" votes for life until the age of 74, when he/she must retire. Among their duties are the responsibilities of appointing clergy to serve in local churches as pastors, performing ordinations, and safeguarding the doctrines and discipline of the Church. The General Conference, held every four years, comprises an equal number of clergy and lay delegates and is when a bishop can be elected. In each Annual Conference, CME bishops serve for four-year terms. CME Church bishops may be male or female.

In 2006, there were an estimated 850,000 members in 3,500 churches. As of 2025, the CME Church has more than 1.2 million members across the United States with mission and sister churches in Haiti, Jamaica and fourteen African nations.

== Doctrine ==
The foundational doctrines of the Christian Methodist Episcopal Church are found in what is commonly referred to in Wesleyan Methodism as The Articles of Religion. The Articles of Religion were derived from the Church of England and abridged by John Wesley, Founder of Methodism, for Methodists in America in 1784.

== Hymnal and responsive readings ==
Sunday worship services in the CME denomination commonly include a Responsive Reading from scripture. A leader reads a line of scripture and the congregation reads a response. Bible passages are not arranged by topic; responsive readings are. Often, a single responsive reading consists of excerpts from several Bible passages.

The CME Responsive Readings are published in The Hymnal of the Christian Methodist Episcopal Church. Items 1–545 are songs, and items 546–604 are Responsive Readings. The official Responsive Readings are from the King James Version of the Bible.

== CME connectional emblem ==
CME Connectional Emblem

The official logo or symbol of the Christian Methodist Episcopal Church was originally authorized by Bishop B. Julian Smith for the Centennial General Conference held in Memphis, 1970. It was officially adopted by the General Conference in 1974 as the denomination's connectional marker.

Designed by Will E. Chambers, the logo shows the place of the Christian Methodist Episcopal Church in the rapidly changing urbanized society and its relation to God's people. The logo is composed of:

The World Globe which represents the vineyard of God;

The Skyline which stands for the Church's concern for human and urban problems and people's alienation from God and one another;

The Weather Vane which symbolizes the need of the Church to be flexible in terms of meeting the contemporary needs of people; and,

The Cross which denotes, by its vertical bar, the need for a proper relationship between people and God, and by its horizontal bar, the need for proper relationships between people. The total Cross is a sign of the final-assured victory through the blood of Jesus Christ.

== Ecumenical activity ==
Since the early 20th century the CME Church has explored the possibility of merging with other African American Methodist churches that are very similar in doctrine and practice.

In 1918 representatives of the CME Church, the African Methodist Episcopal (AME) Church, and the African Methodist Episcopal Zion (AME Zion) Church met in Birmingham, Alabama where they agreed to propose a merger. This "Birmingham Plan" was approved by the CME General Conference but did not win enough support in the annual conferences.

in the late 20th century, the CME Church engaged in new talks with the AME Zion Church on a merger, with CME General Conference delegates approving a union in principle in 1986, and AME Zion delegates giving the same approval in 1988. Bishops of each church reopened the question in 1999, adopting a timeline for an eventual merger.

In May 2012, The Christian Methodist Episcopal Church entered into full communion with the United Methodist Church, African Methodist Episcopal Zion Church, African Union Methodist Protestant Church, African Methodist Episcopal Church, and Union American Methodist Episcopal Church. These Churches agreed to "recognize each other's churches, share sacraments, and affirm their clergy and ministries."

== Notable bishops ==
- 1st Bishop William H. Miles (1828–1892)
- 2nd Bishop Richard H. Vanderhorst (1813–1872)
- 3rd Bishop Joseph A. Beebe (1832–1902)
- 4th Bishop Lucius Henry Holsey, D. D. (1842–1920)
- 5th Bishop Isaac Lane, D. D. (1834–1937)
- 6th Bishop Robert S. Williams, D. D. (1858–1932)
- 7th Bishop Elijah Cottrell, D. D. (1853–1937)
- 8th Bishop Charles Henry Phillips, D.D. (1858–1951)
- 59th Bishop Teresa E. Jefferson-Snorton (1st woman bishop) (1955–)
- Bishop Denise Anders-Modest (2nd woman bishop)

The church elected the first woman bishop in 2010. In 2022, the church elected its second woman bishop. In addition, Jefferson-Snorton became the "first woman to give the episcopal address" during the quadrennial General Conference.

== Colleges ==
- Homer College, Homer, Louisiana; not a true college
- Lane College, Jackson Tennessee
- Paine College, Augusta, Georgia
- Miles College, Birmingham, Alabama
- Texas College, Tyler, Texas
- Phillips School of Theology, Atlanta, Georgia

== See also ==
- Churches Uniting in Christ
- Religion in Black America
- Civil rights movement (1865–1896)
- Methodist Episcopal Church, South
- African Methodist Episcopal Church
- African Methodist Episcopal Zion Church
