= Leroy Stover =

American police officer (1933–2023)

- Leroy Stover as a young police officer, circa 1960's
- Born: May 26, 1933; Alabama, U.S.
- Died: November 2, 2023 (aged 90)
- Police career
- Country: United States
- Department: Birmingham Police Department
- Service years: 1966–1998
- Rank: Deputy Chief

Leroy Stover (May 26, 1933 – November 2, 2023) was an American police officer. Stover was the first black police officer on the Birmingham, Alabama, police force. Serving from 1966 until 1998, Stover rose through the ranks of the Birmingham Police Department to become Deputy Chief in charge of field operations.

== Early life ==
Stover was born May 26, 1933 and raised in rural Alabama. He attended Shiloh High School where he edited the high school newspaper and was a valedictorian, graduating in 1952. He served in the airborne forces, firstly in the 82nd Airborne, and then in 187th Airborne Regimental Combat Team during the last year of the Korean War, where he saw combat. After leaving the military Stover worked for a building supply company in the Ensley neighbourhood of the city, where he worked as a truck driver and as an office worker.

== Hiring ==
Hiring black police officers into the Birmingham Police Department was a demand of the 1963 Birmingham Campaign for civil rights, and also a key demand of the white business community in the city who were the target of boycotts over racial segregation. In the same year, Albert Boutwell, a civil rights moderate, defeated Bull Connor, a segregationist, to become mayor of the city. Boutwell assured civil rights movement leaders that he was actively pursuing the hiring of black officers. Despite numerous black candidates being put forward and passing the exam in the years immediately after 1963, none were hired due to their being perceived to be associated with the civil rights movement, either as having been members of it or having been sponsored by it. The perceived risk of being the first black officer on the force also dissuaded applicants, with one black community leader describing it as "suicide".

By 1966, frustration about the lack of progress in hiring black police officers led to further protests and boycotts in the city, causing business leaders to offer black workers the day off to take the test to become a police officer, and their old jobs back if they decided to resign from the force. Stover, who despite witnessing the civil rights protests had not taken part in them and was not affiliated with the civil rights movement, was seen as a potentially safe candidate and was encouraged to take the test by his boss. Stover had previously had negative experiences with the police force including being racially abused by them and had not considered applying until this point. Stover passed the test and on March 30, 1966, joined the Birmingham Police Department as their first black police officer, followed by Johnnie Johnson Jr. (who later went on to become the city's first black police chief) as their second a day later.

== Police career ==
According to Stover, on his first day on the force he was racially abused and, rather than being sent to the police academy, was put directly onto the beat with a known racist as his partner. Whilst other officers had their patrol cars pick them up from the station, according to his account Stover had to catch a bus to meet his partner and patrol car and was only able to do so in time because the white bus driver went out of his route to take him to the right place. Stover recalled that the senior sergeant had threatened to write him up as AWOL if he had not made it to his patrol car in time, effectively firing him on his first day. Stover and the other black recruits were eventually permitted to go to the police academy after about eight months on the force, but white colleagues still refused to eat with them, and played "pranks" on them including dressing up as members of the KKK. They also had their identities disclosed by white officers whilst working undercover - something that placed them directly in danger.

On December 22, 1966, Stover was singled out for praise by Birmingham Police Chief Jamie Moore for capturing a robbery suspect. Chief Moore described it as a "a good piece of police work." Stover was sent to the West Precinct of the city (a less-well-perceived precinct) after a dispute with his partner over racial profiling. After four years on the force Stover had made the rank of sergeant, and was subsequently promoted to lieutenant. By 1989 Stover had risen to the rank of captain. Stover was promoted to Deputy Chief in charge of field operations in 1992, and retired in 1998.

== Death and legacy ==
Stover died on November 2, 2023, at the age of 90.

The new West Precinct station opened in 2015, the first purpose-built police station in the city, and was dedicated in Stover's honor.
