= Johnnie Johnson Jr. =

American police officer

- Born: April 26, 1942 (age 83)
- Police career
- Country: Birmingham, Alabama
- Department: Birmingham Police Department
- Service years: 1966–1998
- Status: Retired
- Rank: Chief

Johnnie Johnson Jr. (born March 26, 1942, in Birmingham, Alabama) is a former police officer. Johnson was the second black police officer on the Birmingham, Alabama police force and the first black officer to become chief of police in Birmingham.

== Hiring ==
Hiring black police officers into the Birmingham Police Department was a demand of the 1963 Birmingham Campaign for civil rights, and also a key demand of the white business community in the city who were the target of boycotts over racial segregation. In the same year, Albert Boutwell, a civil rights moderate, defeated Bull Connor, a segregationist, to become mayor of the city. Boutwell assured civil right movement leaders that he was actively pursuing the hiring of black officers. Despite numerous black candidates being put forward and passing the exam in the years immediately after 1963, none were hired due to their being perceived to be associated with the civil rights movement, either as having been members of it or having been sponsored by it. The perceived risk of being the first black officer on the force also dissuaded applicants, with one black community leader describing it as "suicide".

Johnson, who had previously volunteered as a civil defence volunteer, patrolling parts of the city vulnerable to racist attacks, signed up to study to become a reserve police officer in 1965. By 1966, frustration about the lack of progress in hiring black police officers led to further protests and boycotts in the city, and Johnson was invited by the deputy chief of the force to take the test to become a full-time officer. Johnson joined the force on March 31, 1966, making him the second black officer to join the force after Leroy Stover who had joined the previous day.

== Police career ==
Johnson has described experiencing racial discrimination after joining the force, with white officers ostracizing him and on occasion referring to him and his fellow black officers as "niggers". By 1971 he had risen to the rank of sergeant, becoming the first black officer on the Birmingham force to hold that rank. The election in 1979 of Richard Arrington, the first black mayor of Birmingham, began an acceleration in racial integration of the force. Johnson was promoted together with Leroy Stover and John Fisher, the only other black sergeants on the force, to the rank of lieutenant in 1981. In 1986 Johnson was promoted to captain, making him the first black on the force to hold that position.

By 1991 Johnson had already made Deputy Chief. Arrington had previously brought in Arthur Deutcsh, a New Yorker, to run the force, however Deutcsh was forced to resign following his conviction for tampering with the arrest records of Richard Arrington's daughter, a conviction that was later overturned. Johnson was then picked to be acting police chief, a position he filled for roughly a year before Arrington appointed Johnson as the force's first black chief of police in 1992.

As Chief of Police, Johnson led efforts against domestic violence, and began a Citizen's Police Academy.
