= Mayor of Birmingham =

Mayor of Birmingham may refer to:

== England ==
- List of mayors of Birmingham, West Midlands, United Kingdom, a ceremonial figurehead elected by the City Council
- Mayor of the West Midlands, who covers the Birmingham metropolitan area

== United States ==
- List of mayors of Birmingham, Alabama, United States
