= Cooper Green Mercy Hospital =

Cooper Green Mercy Health Services
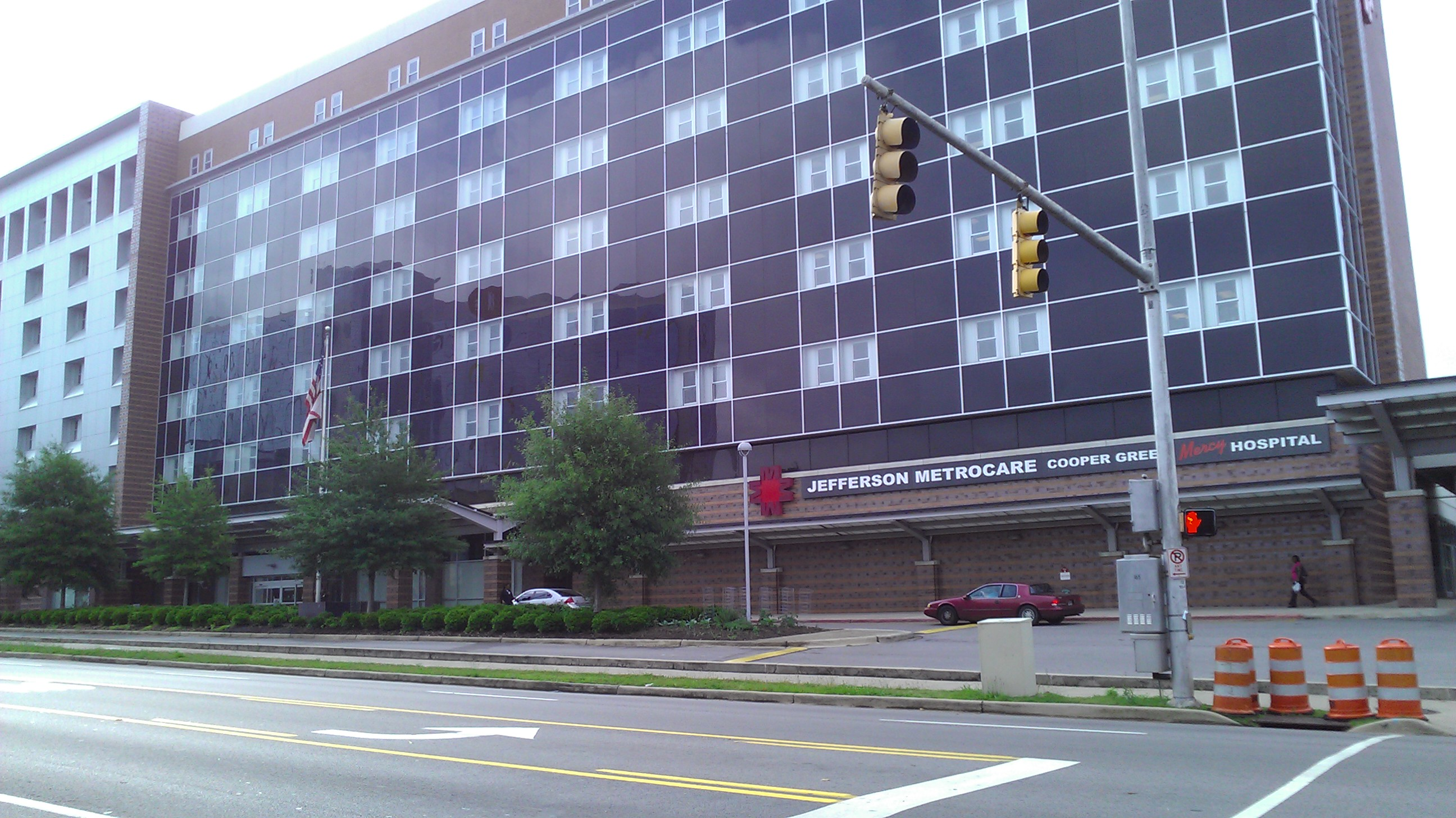

Geography
- Location: 1515 6th Avenue South, Birmingham, Alabama, United States
- Coordinates: 33°30′12″N 86°48′23″W

Organization
- Type: Clinic

History
- Founded: 1972

Links
- Website: www.coopergreen.org
- Lists: Hospitals in Alabama

Cooper Green Mercy Health Services is owned by Jefferson County, Alabama. It first opened as Mercy Hospital in 1972 as a 319-bed acute care facility and was renamed for former Birmingham mayor Cooper Green three years later. It is located at 1515 6th Avenue South, adjacent to UAB Hospital on Birmingham's Southside. After four decades, the hospital closed its inpatient beds on December 31, 2012, and transitioned to a multi-specialty outpatient health service organization. The health service organization offers both primary and specialty care, behavioral health, and urgent care. In addition, it offers an onsite pharmacy, radiology, and clinical laboratory, as well as OT, PT, Speech and Respiratory Therapy. The health service organization continues to offer healthcare to the citizens of Jefferson County regardless of their ability to pay.

Funding for indigent care was established by the Alabama Legislature in 1965, using revenues collected from county sales and liquor taxes. As a county-owned health service organization, Cooper Green Mercy provides healthcare services to all Jefferson County residents with fees based on family size and income. The health service organization coordinates with the University of Alabama at Birmingham (UAB) Health System as a training site for medical residents and to provide patients with diagnostic tests and procedures not provided onsite. In addition, many of the specialty clinics are staffed by UAB faculty who practice part-time at the facility.

From October 2005 to March 2008 the physical plant underwent a $28 million program of extensive renovations and modernization of systems. Brasfield & Gorrie was general contractor for the project.

In May 2009, Birmingham mayor Larry Langford suggested that the city of Birmingham take over operation of the hospital, predicting that the county would try to shut it down amid cost-cutting measures in the wake of a massive County debt crisis. Indeed, Jefferson County, Alabama, did file for voluntary relief under Chapter 9 of the United States Bankruptcy Code on November 9, 2011. His concerns proved unfounded, however. While the County Commission did vote 3 to 2 on August 28, 2012, to close the inpatient portion of the facility that it contended had been subsidized for years from the County's General Fund.
