= Robert Henley =

Robert Henley may refer to:

- Robert Henley (naval officer) (1783–1828), officer in the United States Navy
- Robert Henley, 1st Earl of Northington (1708–1772), Lord Chancellor of Great Britain
- Robert Henley, 2nd Baron Henley (1789–1841), British lawyer and Member of Parliament
- Robert Henley, 2nd Earl of Northington (1747–1786), British politician
- Robert Henley (cricketer) (1851–1889), English cricketer
- Robert Henley (Birmingham mayor) (1843–1873), first mayor of Birmingham, Alabama
- Robert Henley (died 1692), British Member of Parliament for Andover
- Robert Henley (born 1638), British Member of Parliament for Lyme Regis
- Robert Henley (died 1758), British Member of Parliament for Lyme Regis
- Robert "Rob" Henley, briefly the drummer for the punk rock band the Germs
