= James W. Morgan =

Mayor of Birmingham, Alabama

22nd Mayor of Birmingham, Alabama
- In office 1953–1961
- Preceded by: Cooper Green
- Succeeded by: Art Hanes

Personal details
- Born: 1891
- Died: 1971 (aged 79–80)
- Party: Democratic

James W. Morgan (1891 – 1971) was a mayor of the city of Birmingham, Alabama, United States, from 1953 to 1961. Morgan was born in 1891 in Birmingham and educated in that city. He served as a politician in Birmingham from 1934 when he was appointed to the Parks and Recreation Board until 1964 when he resigned from that board. He was mayor from 1953 to 1961, replacing W. Cooper Green. In 1955, Morgan led the fundraising drive for the Birmingham Zoo, which initially bore his name.

== Civil Rights ==
Birmingham was a center of the American Civil rights movement or the 1950s and 1960s and its precursors. Morgan's political positions frequently put him at the center of civil rights debates. In the late 1940s, racial housing policies were creating a housing crisis for the city's black population. In early August 1949, while serving as Commissioner of Public Improvements, Morgan called the racial grounds of the city's zoning ordinance unconstitutional. Morgan was supported by city mayor W. Cooper Green, but that same month, Commissioner of Public Safety T. Eugene Connor rewrote the ordinance to ensure housing segregation could continue. Connor and Morgan continued to feud and Morgan put pressure on the Jefferson County Personnel Board to remove Connor after Connor was caught in the act of adultery in late 1952, but Connor survived the scandal. Connor continued to play an active role in city politics through the 1950s and 1960s, and Morgan continued to feud with Connor and like-minded segregationist politicians such as Art Hanes and J. T. Waggoner.

Morgan was also a key player in a number of issues related to the relationship between the city's black population and the police. In 1954, two Birmingham police officers beat a black man, Charles Patrick, after he was arrested following a parking conflict with a white woman. The officers were initially fired by Police Commissioner Robert Lindbergh, but Morgan reinstated the officers, giving them 30-day suspensions instead. Morgan was mayor when Fred Shuttlesworth led a 1955 campaign to get the city to hire more black officers. Morgan and Commissioner Lindbergh were supportive of the idea, but were hesitant to actually make hires because of the lack of public support, leading to confrontations between Shuttlesworth and Morgan. The idea was tabled when the lynching of Emmett Till.
