= George B. Ward =

American temperance activist

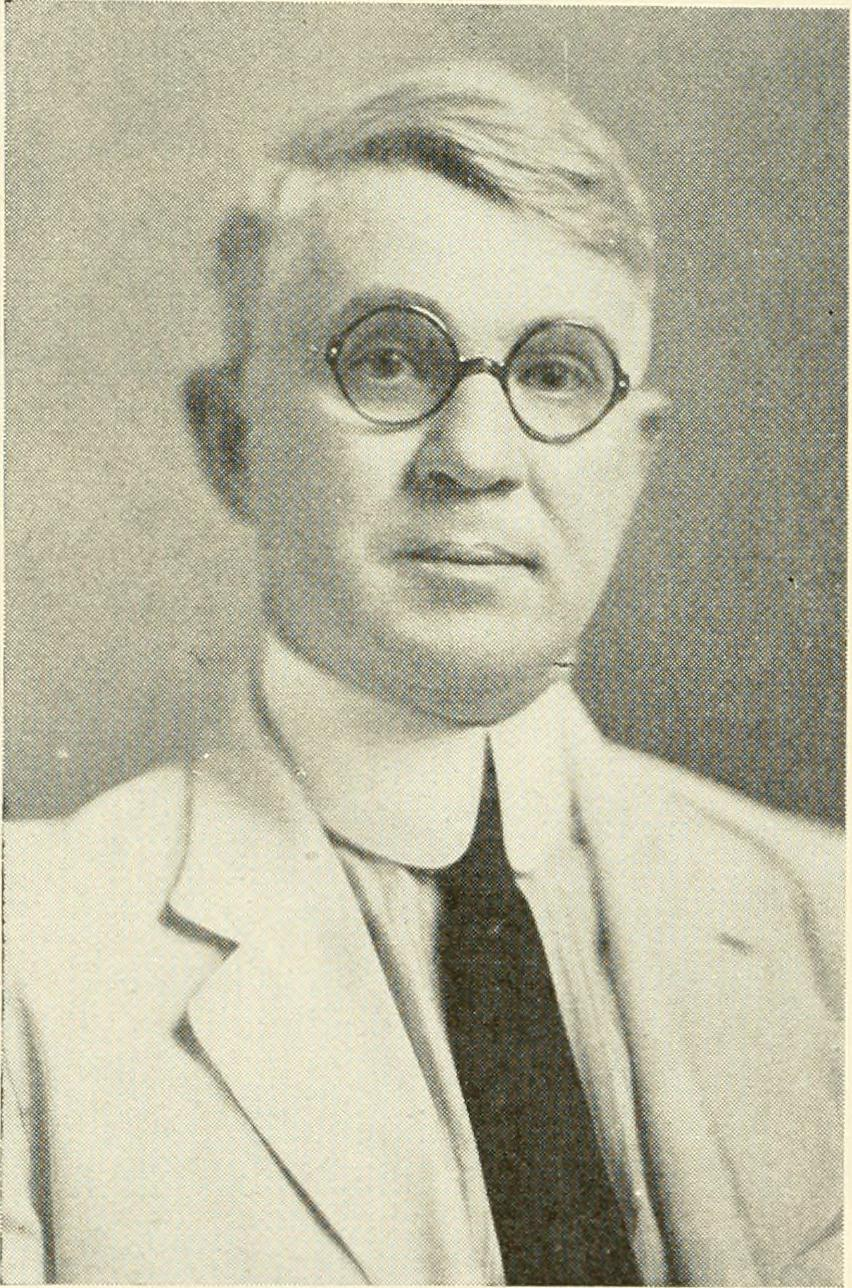
George B. Ward circa 1922

George B. Ward (born March 1, 1867 — died 1940) was the 16th Mayor of Birmingham, Alabama and the owner of the exotic "Vestavia" estate which gives Vestavia Hills, Alabama, its name.

== Early life ==
Ward was born in Atlanta, Georgia, but arrived in the new city of Birmingham shortly after its founding in 1871. His parents, George R. and Margaret Ward, operated the Relay House hotel along with his grandparents William and Jane Ketchum. Ward's mother hosted many social events at the hotel and was one of the founding members of the Episcopal Church of the Advent.

Ward attended the Powell School until he was sixteen and took a job as a runner for Charles Linn's National Bank of Birmingham. He narrowly missed a bullet fired into a mob rushing Birmingham's Jefferson County Courthouse to lynch murderer Richard Hawes on December 8, 1888.

That same year, Ward enrolled in prep school at Cumberland University in Lebanon, Tennessee. When he returned to the bank he was promoted, eventually to the position of paying teller. In 1899 he campaigned successfully for a seat on the Birmingham Board of Aldermen, but resigned after a few months to manage a bank in Sheffield.

In 1900 Ward returned to the National Bank of Birmingham, leaving after a year's time to form a new investment company with John M. Caldwell. He ran again for the Board of Aldermen and was elected to a four-year term, representing Ward 2 of the city.

== Mayor ==
Ward ran against incumbent Mel Drennen in the 1903 Birmingham mayoral election. He campaigned for change and charged that Drennen was constructing a political machine using city employees and that the city was running deficits without performing needed services. He promised to make the city's finances sounder and more transparent. Drennen was re-elected in that race.

When Drennen retired, Ward once again ran for the office, this time against four opponents, of which the strongest was Drennen protégé Charles S. Simmons. Ward won the most votes in the primary, but avoided a run-off when Simmons withdrew from the race. He was inaugurated on May 4, 1905, for a two-year term.

In the 1907 Birmingham mayoral election Ward faced off for the first time against Opera House owner Frank P. O'Brien. Although O'Brien promised to improve the undermanned Birmingham Police Department, Ward easily won re-election - in part by identifying O'Brien as a puppet of liquor and gambling interests.

Ward was known for his strict enforcement of saloon regulations, which he considered a better alternative than strict prohibition. Nevertheless, he became a leader in campaigning for the 1907 referendum which established local prohibition in Jefferson County. He sought constantly to improve the reputation of the city as lawless and intemperate. He worked to cultivate the city's revenue base, leaning on lucrative short-term utility franchises, raising fees, and investing in public projects with anticipated returns.

Ward codified and published the Birmingham Municipal Code for the first time, and mailed a copy of the city's sanitation laws to every household. He established the position of City Comptroller and reported the city's financial balance to the press each month and established several departments, including one responsible for building inspections. He also worked on public safety issues, enlarging the police department and upgrading firefighting equipment. He also invested in sewer construction and worked hard to help the Birmingham City Schools keep pace with the rapidly growing student population.

Ward urged utilities to bury their services underground and instituted city-wide clean-up days to beautify downtown. He also oversaw an enormous expansion of dedicated public park land, including the purchase of 100 acres (0.40 km^{2}) at Green Springs, which is now known as George Ward Park. In order to encourage public use of the parks, he had signs warning people to "Keep Off the Grass" removed.

=== 1907 controversy ===
In 1907 the Alabama Legislature passed a new municipal code which changed the balance of power in city government. Whereas previously the mayor held one vote in meetings of the Board of Aldermen and made all committee appointments, the new law separated legislative and executive powers and gave the mayor only veto power over the Board, while increasing his power to hire and fire city workers.

Ward supported the change, but only with the proviso that it not be adopted until the conclusion of his term of office. Nevertheless, in August 1907, while Ward was on a six-week tour of Europe, the Board of Aldermen voted 10-7 to reorganize as a City Council with John L. Parker as President and Acting Mayor. Parker immediately reassigned all the committees, leaving Ward's supporters primarily in charge of cemetery issues.

With the support of the Birmingham Police Department, Ward opted to ignore the Board's actions. He called a meeting of the "Board of Aldermen" and refused to allow Council members to take seats as officers of the city. Ward's allies introduced a bill to prohibit municipal reorganization until after the 1908 mayoral election, but were unsuccessful. Parker filed suit against Ward, and won a judgment from the Alabama Supreme Court giving the Council control of the city. The anti-Ward faction's main goal of loosening restrictions on saloons, however, was pre-empted by the popular election for prohibition which took effect at the same time.

== President of the Commission ==
In 1910 Ward decided to run for Sheriff of Jefferson County, a more powerful position than Mayor. He spent a great deal of money on his campaign and expected a victory based on polls taken in advance of the election, but ended up losing badly to Walter McAdory. After the election Ward announced that he would never return to politics.

Nevertheless, the progressive movement in Birmingham politics which had reached a peak in 1910 enticed him and he decided to make a run for President of the new Birmingham City Commission in 1913. The first commission had been appointed by Governor B. B. Comer. In the race for the second commission's presidency, Ward defeated Socialist candidate Clement Wood, winning by 10% of the votes cast. Ward took the oath of office on November 13, 1913.

Ward's primary task as Commission President was to lobby to secure additional municipal revenues. He proclaimed that Birmingham's low tax collections placed it alone at the very bottom of the 38 American cities with populations of 100,000 to 300,000. In order to make up the difference, Birmingham's business license fees were among the highest in the country. In anticipation of being absorbed into "Greater Birmingham", many formerly independent cities had undertaken large public works projects which were folded into Birmingham's debt, then over $600,000 and growing by $1,000 a day. Departmental budgets were repeatedly tightened while broad subcommittees explored options for improving municipal finances. The city's recreation and welfare departments closed. Students in city schools were charged fees. Police and fire department personnel were reduced by a third, and the Birmingham Zoo was closed down.

The Alabama legislature only grudgingly prepared a bill for referendum that would allow Birmingham to increase its municipal income tax rate from 1% to 1.5%. The measure failed in referendum in 1915.

In the face of the city's financial incapacity, Ward mounted an aggressive public relations campaign to beautify the city through citizen-led action. The department of public works assisted citizen-led drives to tend vacant lots and plant gardens. Ward's implementation of the national City Beautiful movement attracted the attention of the national press. The cooperation of the local press helped preserve Ward's reputation despite the city's precarious financial situation.

Frustrated, though, by his inability to secure adequate revenues, Ward announced he would not run for re-election in 1917. East Lake physician Nathaniel Barrett was his primary opponent, smearing Ward, an Episcopalian, as part of a supposed "Roman Catholic conspiracy". Barrett had the support of the "True Americans", which became the target of Ward's most outspoken campaign denunciations, as well as a secretly filmed exposé.

Ward's popularity carried him in the central city, but the annexed suburbs overwhelmingly supported Barrett, and Ward left politics for the last time.

During the President Warren Harding's 1921 visit to Birmingham, Ward rode alongside African American barber Frank McQueen in the lead car, representing the "Pioneers of 1871" who had lived in the city since its founding.

In 1923 Ward purchased a 20-acre (81,000 m^{2}) parcel of land on the ridge of Shades Mountain and created a unique residence, the "Vestavia" estate in 1925. The house was modeled on the circular Temple of Vesta in Rome and was surrounded by landscaped gardens and fountains. His garden parties, featuring toga-clad dancers and servers dressed as Roman soldiers, were legendary.

Ward died in 1940.

Preceded by Mel Drennen	Mayor of Birmingham, Alabama; 1905 — 1908	Succeeded by Frank P. O'Brien
Preceded by Culpepper Exum	President of the Birmingham City Commission; 1913 — 1917	Succeeded by Nathaniel Barrett

== Writings ==
- "Geo. Ward Made a Business Mayor. Geo. Ward Will Make a Business Sheriff. Help Him Win" (1910) Birmingham. Roberts & Son, Printers. - accessed via the Birmingham Public Library Digital Collections
