= David Vann =

David Vann may refer to:

- David Vann (mayor) (1928–2000), mayor of Birmingham, Alabama
- David Vann (Cherokee leader) (1800–1863), treasurer of the Cherokee Nation
- David Vann (writer) (born 1966), writer, sailor and creative writing professor at the University of Warwick

== See also ==
- David Van, Australian politician
