= Art Hanes =

American mayor

Arthur J. Hanes
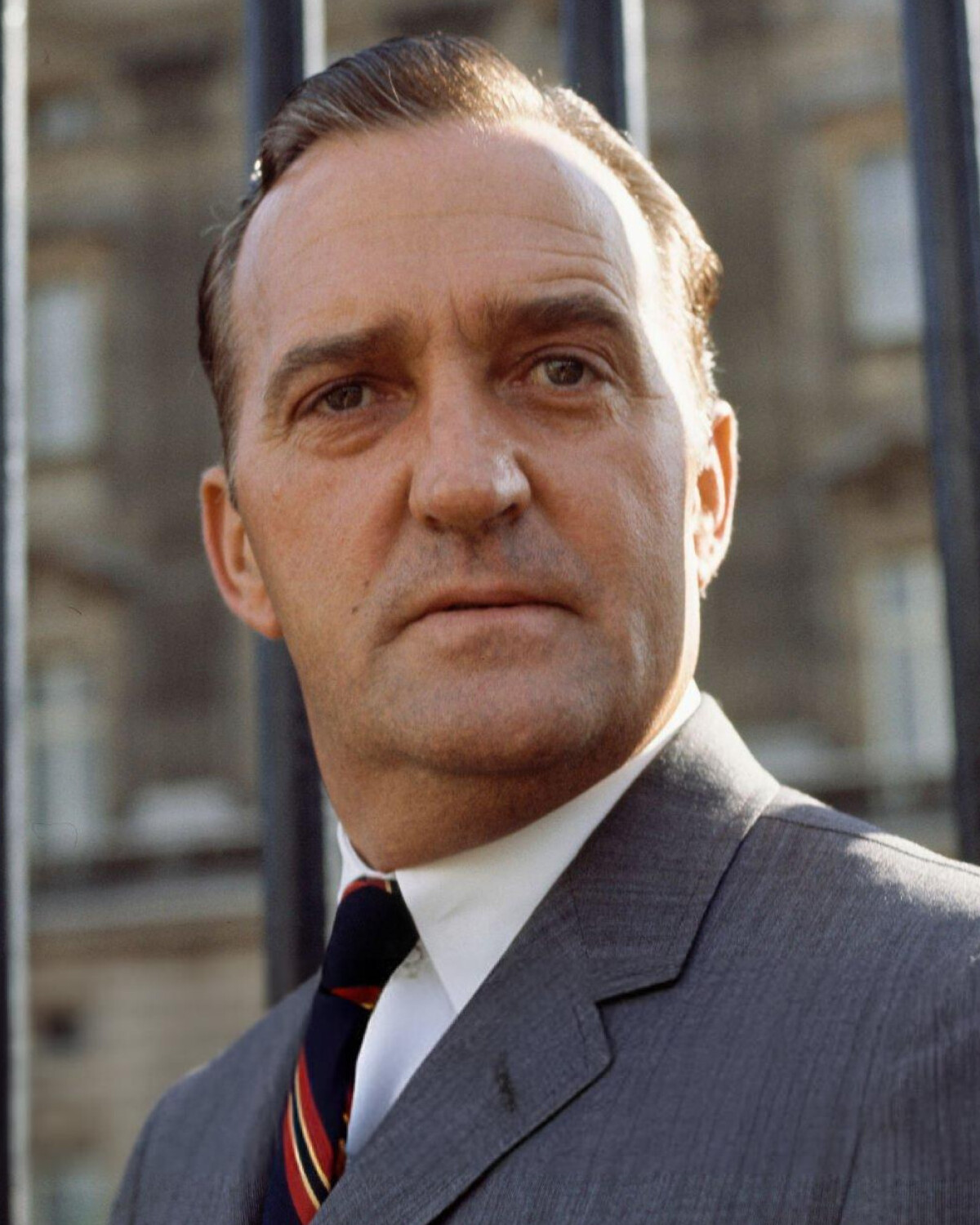
- Hanes in 1968

Mayor of Birmingham, Alabama
- In office 1961–1963
- Preceded by: James W. Morgan
- Succeeded by: Albert Boutwell

Personal details
- Born: October 19, 1916 Birmingham, Alabama, U.S.
- Died: May 8, 1997 (aged 80) Birmingham, Alabama, U.S.
- Party: Democratic

Arthur J. Hanes (October 19, 1916 – May 8, 1997) was mayor of Birmingham, Alabama, between 1961 and 1963, a tumultuous time that saw the city become a focal point in the burgeoning Civil Rights Movement during the Birmingham campaign. Hanes, who served just one term as mayor, was part of a three-man commission that ran the city; a trio which included police commissioner Eugene (Bull) Connor. Hanes was legal counsel for defendants in two important murder cases connected to the civil rights movement.

== Early years ==
Hanes graduated from Birmingham–Southern College, playing on both the baseball and football squads, before then earning a law degree from the University of Alabama. He then became an FBI agent moving on to serve as head of security at Birmingham's Hayes Aircraft in 1951.

== Mayoral career ==
Ten years later, he began as the underdog in a runoff election for mayor of Birmingham, with his opponent, Tom King, a former district attorney, focusing on economic factors. Hanes found his niche in the closing weeks of the campaign when he began to emphasize differences toward racial issues between the two men. Hanes distributed a photo of King shaking the hand of black man, noted his support among blacks during the primary and referred to him as "Washington's candidate," a clear appeal to those opposed to integration. Hanes won the election by nearly 4,000 votes

Hanes' tenure as mayor of Birmingham was marked by virulent opposition to desegregation, an approach that helped the city to acquire the dubious nickname "Bombingham", a reference to the often violent nature of such protests. In addition, Hanes created a firestorm in December 1961, when he defied a federal court order by closing 67 parks, 38 playgrounds, eight swimming pools and four golf courses in the city. The order had demanded for those facilities to be integrated by January 15, 1962, but Hanes simply cut off $295,000 in park funds and dismissed its employees. Shortly afterward, he met with 60 local residents, who implored him to reconsider his order, but Hanes remained adamant in his opposition. One individual had cited the inevitability of integration, but Hanes snapped, "That's your opinion, madam," and later closed the meeting by saying, "I don't think any of you want a nigger mayor or a nigger police chief, but I tell you, that's what'll happen if we play dead on this park integration."

In November 1962, Hanes announced plans to shut down Birmingham City Hall's press room, saying, "Why should we continue to provide quarters, heat and light for our enemies?" He followed that up by indicating that he would no longer speak with newspapers that advocated for a change in the form of Birmingham's government to mayor-council and would only make available documents that were of public record. A subsequent editorial by Birmingham Post-Herald editor James E. Mills that criticized the move and charged that Hanes and other city commissioners had promised firefighters a raise if the vote failed. Since the editorial had appeared on Election Day, that and other alleged violations led to Mills' arrest for violating a 1915 Alabama state law banning corrupt practices. A four-day trial resulted in Mills' acquittal.

The measure to change the government passed by a narrow margin, though Hanes continued to fight any election for mayor and council seats. His attempt to obtain a temporary injunction to halt the March 5, 1963, vote was rejected by the Alabama Supreme Court. Former Alabama lieutenant governor Albert Boutwell and Birmingham police chief Eugene (Bull) Connor emerged as the top vote-getters, which resulted in an April 2 runoff that was won by Boutwell. Despite the vote, Hanes indicated the following day that he would not recognize the results and stated that he had been elected to a four-year term, which would not expire until November 1965.

Despite the fact that Boutwell and the council members were inaugurated on April 15, Hanes continued his legal fight. He also championed resistance against the civil rights protests in support of desegregating downtown Birmingham stores in May and fully supported the drastic measures taken by Connor, which included turning fire hoses on protesters.

== Legal highlights ==
During the second of the Selma to Montgomery marches in March 1965, a civil rights worker, Viola Liuzzo, was murdered. The subsequent trial of her accused murderers, Collie Leroy Jenkins Jr., Eugene Thomas and William Orville Eaton, resulted in a hung jury, but before a second trial could commence, the trio's lawyer, Matt H. Murphy Jr., was killed in an automobile accident. He was replaced by Hanes, who had served as a pallbearer at Murphy's funeral, insisted he would "stick to the facts," a nod to the racist appeals made by Murphy in the first case. The trio was acquitted in the state court, but were found guilty in federal court on December 3, 1965, and sentenced to 10 years in prison.

Less than two weeks after that verdict was rendered, Hanes was in court again on another case when he filed a libel suit against Time Inc. on behalf of Bernard Lee Akin, Earl B. Akin, Tommy A. Horne, James Thomas Harris and Oliver Warner Jr. The five men claimed that their businesses had been damaged when Life Magazine, in their December 15, 1964, issue, identified them as members of the Ku Klux Klan. The case was thrown out of court two months later when Federal Judge Seybourn H. Lynne ruled that the plaintiffs had not filed in the required one-year time period when they filed on December 16, 1965."

In June 1968, fugitive James Earl Ray, wanted for the murder of Martin Luther King Jr. in Memphis, Tennessee, two months earlier, was captured in London, England and retained Hanes as his lawyer. Hanes visited with him on July 5–6, 1968, approximately 10 days before Ray dropped his bid to avoid extradition. Expecting to travel back with Ray, Hanes was outraged when his client was taken back to Memphis in the middle of the night. Unfounded fears of FBI agents questioning him without a lawyer were the basis for Hanes' anger, who also said, ""The case against this boy is full of holes and I've got a few bombshells that we're going to drop into those holes."

Hanes never got that chance. On November 10, less than two days before the trial was to begin, Ray dismissed Hanes and replaced him with the flamboyant Percy Foreman, a move that was seen by many as a stalling tactic. Tensions between Ray and Hanes had begun to surface in September 1968 when Ray insisted that J.B. Stoner, a Georgia lawyer who was also a former Ku Klux Klan organizer, be added to the defense team. Hanes refused, but Ray dropped the request soon after meeting with Stoner. Ray's brothers had also complained that Hanes had not negotiated a better deal with Look Magazine on a series of stories on Ray's life, and also wanted libel suits filed against a number of magazines that had referred to Ray as King's murderer. Ray eventually pleaded guilty to King's murder and was sentenced to 99 years in prison in March 1969. Despite his dismissal by Ray, Hanes continued to support Ray's claims of innocence.

On September 26, 1977, 73-year-old Robert Chambliss was indicted for the September 15, 1963, bombing of the 16th Street Baptist Church in Birmingham that had killed four young girls, with Hanes and his son serving as the defense counsel. In the trial two months later, one of the most damaging moments for Hanes' defense came when Chambliss' niece testified against the man who had been dubbed, "Dynamite Bob" by authorities. On November 18, 1977, Chambliss was convicted of the murder of Denise McNair and sentenced to life in prison. Ironically, the verdict came on what would have been McNair's 26th birthday.

In 1979, Hanes indicated that he was not a racist in spite of all of his past actions and defense of white supremacists. "Why, I've never known a man who was a Klansman. I've never associated with the group. I merely acted as any attorney for men who were alleged to be Klansmen. People are entitled to defense counsel."

Hanes died on May 8, 1997.
