= 1964 Alabama Public Service Commission election =

- November 3, 1964
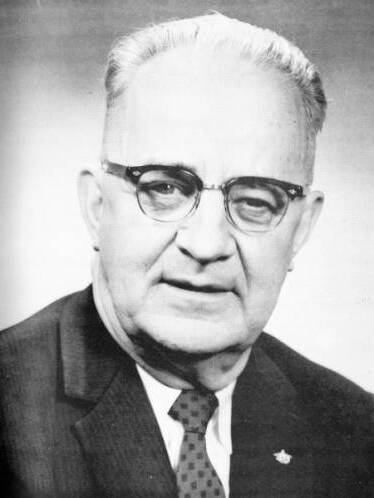
Candidate	Bull Connor
Party	Democratic
Popular vote	265,046
Percentage	100.0%
President before election
Jack Owen
Democratic
Elected President
Bull Connor
Democratic

The 1964 Alabama Public Service Commission election was held on November 3, 1964, to elect the president of the Alabama Public Service Commission. Primary elections were held on May 5, 1964. The primary runoff election was held on June 2, 1964.

== Democratic primary ==
=== Candidates ===
==== Nominee ====
- Eugene "Bull" Connor, Birmingham Commissioner of Public Safety (1937–1954, 1957–1963)

==== Eliminated in runoff ====
- C. C. (Jack) Owen, incumbent Public Service Commission president

==== Eliminated in primary ====
- J. E. (Big Jim) Folsom, former Governor of Alabama (1947–1951, 1955–1959)

=== Results ===
Democratic primary
Party	Candidate	Votes	%
Democratic	C. C. (Jack) Owen	255,393	42.45
Democratic	Eugene "Bull" Connor	217,519	36.21
Democratic	J. E. (Big Jim) Folsom	127,800	21.27
Total votes		600,712	100.00

==== Runoff ====
===== Results =====
Democratic primary runoff
Party	Candidate	Votes	%
Democratic	Eugene "Bull" Connor	225,676	52.47
Democratic	C. C. (Jack) Owen	204,418	47.53
Total votes		430,094	100.00

== General election ==
=== Results ===
1964 Alabama Public Service Commission election
Party	Candidate	Votes	%
Democratic	Eugene "Bull" Connor	265,046	100.00
Total votes		265,046	100.00
