= List of mayors of Birmingham, Alabama =

The office of mayor of Birmingham, Alabama, United States, was established with the incorporation of the city in 1871. Robert Henley was appointed by Governor Robert B. Lindsay to a two-year term. Until 1910, the Mayor presided over an ever-expanding Board of Aldermen who generally campaigned on the same ticket. Progressive reformers lobbied for a change in the form of government that year, resulting in the creation of a five-member Board of Commissioners (later reduced to three members). The President of the Commission, though not formally holding the title, was widely acknowledged as "Mayor" under that system.

As Birmingham grew, it eventually became the county seat of Jefferson County. Before Birmingham, the county seats were established first at Carrollsville (1819–1821), then Elyton (1821–1873). For many years, Birmingham was viewed as underrepresented in the state and federal legislature because its representation did not increase proportionately with its population growth. The city's new urban needs were ignored by rural officials, who refused to redistrict the area appropriately to represent the influx of immigrants and manual laborers, among others. The transition of Birmingham to the seat of Jefferson County allowed its local politics to become more influential on the state level.

In 1963, as part of another progressive effort, this time to unseat Public Safety Commissioner Bull Connor, the form of government was again changed by referendum. Reorganized under Alabama's Mayor Council Act of 1955, the city government consisted of a mayor and nine at-large City Council representatives. Changing demographics in the city's electorate led to the election of Birmingham's first African-American mayor, Richard Arrington Jr., in 1979.

In 1989 a change was made to elect council members by district, with 4-year terms coming at the midpoint of the mayoral term (allowing sitting council members to campaign for the mayoral office without having to resign their seats).

== Mayors ==
Image	Representative	Years	Electoral history
Mayors of Birmingham
	Robert Henley	December 19, 1871 – July 1872	Appointed by Robert B. Lindsay
	W. J. McDonald	July 1872	Acting Mayor while Henley was absent
	Thomas Tate	July 1872	Interim Mayor
	Robert Henley	July 1872 – April 22, 1873	Died
	James Robert Powell	1873–1875 [data missing]	Succeeded after Robert Henley's death. [data missing]
	William Harrington Morris	1875–1878 [data missing]	
	Henry M. Caldwell	1878 [data missing]	
	Thomas Jeffers	1878–1882 [data missing]	
	A. O. Lane	1882–1888 [data missing]	
	B. A. Thompson	1888–1890 [data missing]	
	A. O. Lane	1890–1892 [data missing]	
	David J. Fox	1892–1894 [data missing]	
	James A. Van Hoose	1894–1896 [data missing]	
	Frank V. Evans	1896–1899 [data missing]	
	Mel Drennen	1899–1905 [data missing]	
	George B. Ward	1905–1908 [data missing]	
	Frank P. O'Brien	1908–1910 [data missing]	
	Culpepper Exum	1910–1913 [data missing]	
Presidents of the Birmingham City Commission
	George B. Ward	November 1913 – 1917 [data missing]	Mayor of Birmingham, Alabama, 1905–1908; Chose not to re-run
	Nathaniel Barrett	1917–1921 [data missing]	
	David E. McClendon	1921–1925 [data missing]	
	James M. Jones Jr.	1925–1940 [data missing]	
	Cooper Green	1940–1953 [data missing]	
	James W. Morgan	1953–1961 [data missing]	
	Art Hanes	1961–1963 [data missing]	
Mayors of Birmingham
	Albert Boutwell	1963–1967 [data missing]	
	George G. Siebels Jr.	1967–1975 [data missing]	
	David Vann	1975 – November 12, 1979 [data missing]	
	Richard Arrington Jr.	November 13, 1979 – 1999	First African-American mayor [data missing]
	William A. Bell	1999 [data missing]	Interim Mayor
	Bernard Kincaid	1999 – November 12, 2007 [data missing]	
	Larry Langford	November 13, 2007 – October 28, 2009 [data missing]	
	Carole Smitherman	October 29, 2009 – November 2009 [data missing]	Acting Mayor; First African-American female mayor [data missing]
	Roderick Royal	November 2009 – January 25, 2010 [data missing]	Acting Mayor
	William A. Bell	January 26, 2010 – November 27, 2017 [data missing]	
	Randall Woodfin	November 28, 2017 – present [data missing]	

== President of the Commission ==
Representative	Years	Electoral history
Culpepper Exum	1913 [data missing]	[data missing]
George B. Ward	November 1913 – 1917 [data missing]	Mayor of Birmingham, Alabama, 1905–1908; Chose not to re-run
Nathaniel Barrett	1917–1921 [data missing]	[data missing]
David E. McClendon	1921–1925 [data missing]	[data missing]
James M. Jones Jr.	1925–1940 [data missing]	[data missing]
Cooper Green	1940–1953 [data missing]	[data missing]
James W. Morgan	1953–1961 [data missing]	[data missing]
Art Hanes	1961–1963 [data missing]	[data missing]

== Mayor-Council Act of 1955 ==
The Mayor-Council Act was a law passed by the Alabama State Legislature which restructured the municipal government of the City of Birmingham. It was intended to provide the citizens of Birmingham with more appropriate representation in government that was reflective of population changes during the century. It also attempted to balance the legislative and executive powers of the municipal government by removing the President of the Commission's ability to vote on proposed actions, instead giving the Mayor only veto power. The act was adopted following a vote by a referendum of Birmingham citizens on November 6, 1962. The first mayor under the Act was elected on March 5, 1963, as Albert Boutwell defeated incumbent Commissioner of Public Safety Bull Connor.

== See also ==
- Timeline of Birmingham, Alabama
- 2025 Birmingham, Alabama mayoral election
