= Cooper Green =

American politician

President of the Jefferson County Commission
- In office April 1, 1965 – January 23, 1975
- Preceded by: W. D. Kendrick
- Succeeded by: Tom Gloor

President of the Birmingham City Commission
- In office February 1940 – April 1953
- Preceded by: James M. Jones Jr.
- Succeeded by: James W. Morgan

8th President of the United States Conference of Mayors
- In office 1949–1950
- Preceded by: George W. Welsh
- Succeeded by: David L. Lawrence

Postmaster of Birmingham, Alabama
- In office 1933–1940
- Appointed by: Franklin D. Roosevelt

Member of the Alabama House of Representatives
- In office 1931–1933

Personal details
- Died: July 29, 1980 (age 79) Birmingham, Alabama
- Party: Democratic
- Children: 5
- Cooper Green's voice Clip of Mayor Cooper Green during proclamation of Erskine Ramsay Day; Recorded 09 June 1942

W. Cooper Green was an American politician who served as President of the Birmingham City Commission (mayor of Birmingham, Alabama), President of the Jefferson County, Alabama County Commission, a member of the Alabama House of Representatives, and postmaster of Birmingham, Alabama. He also served as president of the United States Conference of Mayors.

== Early life ==
Green was born in North Birmingham. Green was the son of Charles Martin Green, a real estate promoter involved in developing much of North Birmingham and Tarrant, Alabama.

Green attended public schools in Birmingham, and attended Birmingham–Southern College. He worked for some time in the real estate industry before being elected to the state legislature.

== Early political career: state legislator and postmaster ==
Elected in 1930, Green served in the 1931–1933 Alabama State Legislature.

Appointed by President Franklin D. Roosevelt, Green served as the postmaster of Birmingham from 1933 until 1940. He had been recommended for appointment by U.S. Senator Hugo Black.

Green was involved in running the political campaigns of several other individuals.

== Mayoralty ==
From 1940 until 1953, Green served as president of the Birmingham City Commission, the equivalent of mayor. He was first elected in a February 1940 special election to serve out the unexpired term of James M. Jones Jr., who had died in office. He assumed office on February 29, 1940. He was elected to a full term in May 1941 without opposition. He was reelected again without opposition in 1945. His final reelection came in 1949, and same him win a record majority. Green was regarded as an independent and liberal member of the Democratic Party. As mayor, his personal motto was "Forward Birmingham".

During his mayoralty, he was a leader in the municipal annexation of unincorporated areas through a vote held in September 1949. The annexation added 27,000 residents to the city. He oversaw the municipal purchase and the expansion of the city's waterworks system. During his mayoralty, the State Fair Authority, a branch of the municipal government's, purchased of the Alabama State Fairgrounds. Other notable projects during his mayoralty included an expansion of the city's airport, the expansion of Legion Field by 20,00 seats, the creation of eleven parks for "negro" residents and seven new parks for white residents, and many other projects. The city decreased its bond debt during his mayoralty. He was a driving force in the creation of the new Mercy Hospital (today named for him).

In 1941, Green joined with mayors of nearby cities to call for residents to contribute to a drive aiming to raise $50,000 for the British War Relief Society.

Green also served in leadership roles of organizations during his mayoralty. From 1949 through 1950, Green served as president of the United States Conference of Mayors. He was elected to the position in March 1949, and was the first mayor from the Southern United States to hold the position in sixteen years. Before this, he had served as Vice President. In 1941, the Alabama Softball Association's board of governors elected Green to serve as the organization's president. Cooper also served as president of the Alabama League of Municipalities during the final three years of his mayoralty.

In 1947, Green and two other U.S. mayors were appointed by the U.S. secretary of state to study municipal issues in postwar Europe. In 1950, he was appointed by the U.S. Secretary of State to represent the United States government at the 400th anniversary celebrations of the founding of Helsinki, Norway. In 1950, Green was made a Knight of St. Olof's by Norway's king.

While Green was widely expected to run for governor of Alabama in 1950, in January 1950 he announced that he would not run and would instead focus on his work in the city of Birmingham.

In February 1953, Green announced that, effective in April, he would his position as president of the city commission in order to serve as vice president of Alabama Power. Before he tendered his surprise resignation in order to enter the private sector, he had been widely speculated as a possible candidate for governor in 1954. Upon his resignation, Dan Cobb of The Birmingham News wrote, "Probably no man in Alabama is better known than Cooper Green. One of the state's–and the nation's–most popular municipal officials."

== Private sector interregnum from government ==
During his time in the private sector, Green was involved in causes such as the American Cancer Society.

== President of the Jefferson County Commission ==
In March 1965, Governor George Wallace appointed Green to serve as the president of the Jefferson County Commission. He was appointed to fill the vacancy left by the death in office of W. D. Kendrick. Green was sworn in on April 1, 1965.

Among other actions, Green advocated for Mercy Hospital, and oversaw an expansion of the county's Juvenile Court.

Cooper retired from the commission in 1975. The month he left office, the Alabama Legislature renamed Mercy Hospital as Cooper Green Mercy Hospital. He was succeeded by Tom Gloor on January 23, 1975.

== Personal life and death ==
Green was the father of five children.

Green died in a Birmingham nursing home on June 29, 1980, at the age of 79. Green had been sick for several years, suffering from heart ailments and diabetes.
