= Nathaniel Barrett =

American physician

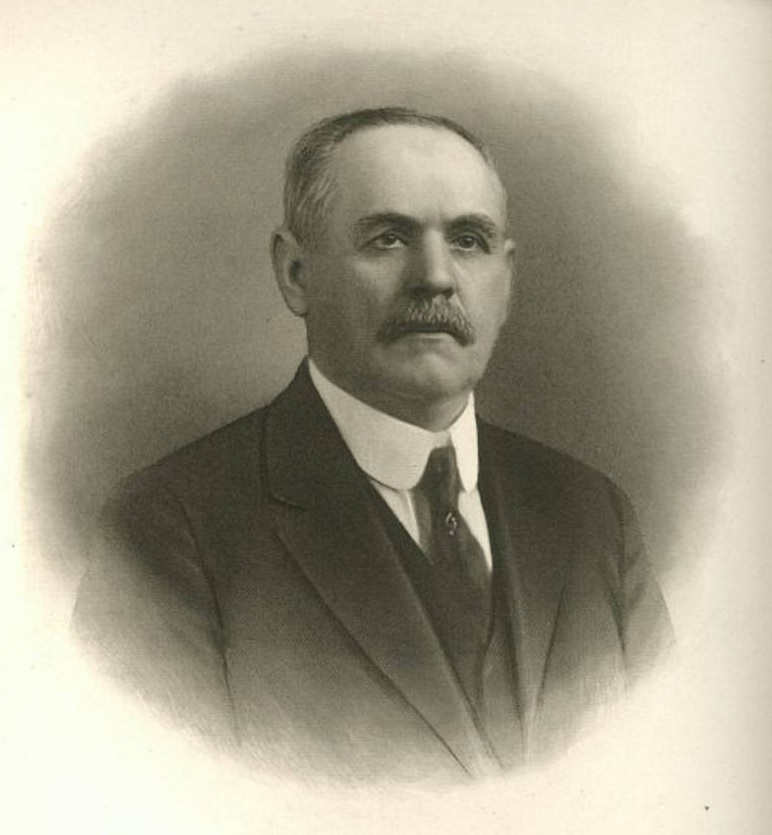
- Born: January 16, 1861; Lawrence County, Alabama, United States
- Died: September 12, 1933 (aged 72); Decatur, Alabama, United States
- Occupations: Physician and politician

Nathaniel A. Barrett (1861-1933) was an American physician and politician.

He was born on January 16, 1861, in Lawrence County, Alabama, to David B. Barrett and Charlotte Wilson Aldridge Barrett. His father was a carpenter and contractor. Barrett attended public schools in Lawrence County and a private school run by C.G. Lynch. He began to study medicine under Dr. C.A. Crow at Moulton, then spent one year in the medical department of the University of Alabama and later attended the medical department of Vanderbilt University, where he earned an M.D. in 1886.

Upon getting his degree, Barrett began practicing in Danville, Alabama. There, he served as president as the Morgan County Medical Society and also as chairman of the county democratic executive committee. In 1891, he moved to East Lake, which was at that time not a part of Birmingham. There, he built a large and lucrative practice.

Barrett was active in the incorporation of East Lake as a municipality and served as its first and last mayor. East Lake adopted the code form of municipal government in 1910 during Barrett's last term as mayor. Barrett was elected president of the Birmingham Commission (a position equivalent to that of a mayor) in 1917 after a hotly contested race against George B. Ward, the incumbent. As head of the city's finance department, he brought the city's expenditures within its income. He also served as a member of the Jefferson County Democratic Committee.

He was a member of the Knights Templar, the Shrine, Knights of Pythias, and the Junior Order of United American Mechanics. He was a Baptist and was active in church affairs. He married Annie P. Troup of Danville on May 5, 1891. Barrett died on September 12, 1933, in Decatur, Alabama.

Preceded by George B. Ward	President of the Birmingham City Commission; 1913 — 1917	Succeeded by David E. McClendon
