= William G. Hardwick =

American politician (1910–1993)

18th Lieutenant Governor of Alabama
- In office January 17, 1955 – January 19, 1959
- Governor: Jim Folsom
- Preceded by: James Allen
- Succeeded by: Albert Boutwell

Member of the Alabama Senate
- In office 1946

Personal details
- Born: William Guy Hardwick; May 30, 1910 Hartford, Alabama, U.S.
- Died: January 15, 1993 (aged 82)
- Party: Democratic
- Spouse: Dorothy Creel (m. 1936)
- Parent(s): William Robert Hardwick; Emma Corbitt
- Education: Hartford High School; University of Alabama
- Profession: Politician, lawyer

Military service
- Allegiance: United States
- Branch/service: United States Air Force
- Years of service: 1942–1945
- Rank: Major

William Guy Hardwick (May 30, 1910 – January 15, 1993) was an American politician and lawyer who served as the 18th lieutenant governor of Alabama from 1955 to 1959 as a member of the Democratic Party.

== Early life and education ==
Hardwick was born in Hartford, Alabama, on May 30, 1910, to William Robert Hardwick and Emma Corbitt. He was educated in Hartford public schools and graduated from Hartford High School in 1928. Hardwick subsequently graduated from the University of Alabama, where he also obtained a law degree in 1933.

== Career ==
In 1933, Hardwick entered the private practice of law in Dothan, Alabama. He served as a member of the Alabama House of Representatives and as a law clerk with the Alabama Code Committee of 1940. Hardwick was re-elected to the Alabama House of Representatives in 1942, though he resigned to enter the United States Air Force that same year, enlisting as a second lieutenant. He was discharged as a major on December 25, 1945.

Hardwick served as a member of the Alabama Senate in 1946, representing the counties of Henry and Houston. In 1954, Hardwick was elected lieutenant governor of Alabama, serving from 1955 to 1959.

== Personal life and death ==
Hardwick married Dorothy Creel in Dothan, Alabama, on September 18, 1936.

Hardwick was affiliated with both Freemasonry and the Shriners.

Hardwick died at the age of 82 on January 15, 1993.

Political offices
Preceded by James Allen	18th Lieutenant Governor of Alabama; 1955–1959	Succeeded by Albert B. Boutwell
