= David Vann (mayor) =

American politician (1928–2000)

David Johnston Vann

Mayor of Birmingham, Alabama
- In office 1975–1979
- Preceded by: George G. Siebels Jr.
- Succeeded by: Richard Arrington Jr.

Personal details
- Born: August 10, 1928 Roanoke, Alabama
- Died: March 28, 2000 (aged 71) Birmingham, Alabama
- Resting place: Memorial Garden Cemetery in Demopolis
- Party: Democratic
- Children: 3
- Education: University of Alabama

Military service
- Allegiance: United States
- Branch/service: United States Navy
- Rank: Lieutenant
- Battles/wars: World War II

David Johnson Vann (August 10, 1928 – June 9, 2000) was an American lawyer and politician, who served as mayor of Birmingham, Alabama, from 1975 until 1979.

== Early life and education ==
Vann was born in Randolph County, Alabama. He graduated from the University of Alabama in 1950, and from the university's law school in 1951.

== Career ==
He served as clerk to United States Supreme Court Justice Hugo Black, and was present in the courtroom when the court handed down the 1954 Brown v. Board of Education school desegregation decision.

After completing his term as court clerk Vann settled in Birmingham and joined the law firm of White, Bradley, Arant, All and Rose. In 1963, Vann helped organize a referendum that changed Birmingham's form of government from a three-member commission to a mayor and nine-member council. Vann served as a special assistant to Birmingham mayor Albert Boutwell under the new city government.

In 1971, Vann was elected to the Birmingham city council. That same year he helped lead an unsuccessful campaign, known as "One Great City," to consolidate the city governments of Birmingham and its suburbs into a single countywide municipal government. Vann was elected mayor of Birmingham in 1975 and served one term, losing his bid for reelection to Richard Arrington, Jr. In 1980, Vann became a lobbyist and special counsel to Arrington, and served two terms as chair of the Birmingham Water Works and Sewer Board. As counsel to the mayor Vann oversaw an aggressive annexation campaign, adding substantial areas south of Birmingham to the city limits and frustrating efforts by several Birmingham suburbs to block the city's growth. Vann was active in civic organizations and was a founding board member of the Birmingham Civil Rights Institute.

Vann died in Birmingham on March 28, 2000.

== Honors ==
Vann was inducted into the Alabama Lawyers' Hall of Fame in 2012.

== See also ==
- List of law clerks for the first seat of the Supreme Court of the United States

Political offices
Preceded by George G. Siebels, Jr.	Mayor of Birmingham, Alabama; 1975–1979	Succeeded by Richard Arrington Jr.
