= Drake Boutwell =

American politician

Member of the Alabama House of Representatives from the 14th district
- In office 1970–1974

Personal details
- Party: Democratic
- Parent: Albert Boutwell (father)
- Education: Vanderbilt University; University of Alabama School of Law

Drake Boutwell is an American politician. He served as a Democratic member for the 14th district of the Alabama House of Representatives.

== Life and career ==
Boutwell attended Vanderbilt University and the University of Alabama School of Law.

In 1970, Boutwell was elected to represent the 14th district of the Alabama House of Representatives, serving until 1974.
