= George G. Siebels Jr. =

American politician (1913–2000)

George G. Seibels Jr.

Mayor of Birmingham, Alabama
- In office 1967–1975
- Preceded by: Albert Boutwell
- Succeeded by: David Vann

Alabama State Representative from Jefferson County
- In office 1975–1990

Personal details
- Born: July 16, 1913 Coronado, California
- Died: March 28, 2000 (aged 86) Birmingham, Alabama
- Resting place: Arlington Antebellum House in Birmingham
- Party: Republican
- Children: Laura Seibels Czaplicki
- Education: University of Virginia
- Occupation: Insurance agent; Professional football player

Military service
- Allegiance: United States
- Branch/service: United States Navy
- Rank: Lieutenant
- Battles/wars: World War II

George G. Seibels Jr. (July 16, 1913 – March 28, 2000), was the first Republican to serve as the mayor of Birmingham, Alabama. Seibels was born in 1913 in Coronado, California. He was the son of Rear Admiral George Seibels, Sr., of Montgomery, Alabama, and a great-grandson of George Goldthwaite, former chief justice of the Alabama Supreme Court and a United States senator.

Seibels was reared in Virginia and graduated in 1937 from the University of Virginia at Charlottesville with a Bachelor of Arts in history. At the university, he was the intramural light-heavy weight boxing champion for three years. After graduation, he spent one year playing professional football.

Seibels moved to Birmingham in 1938 to work in the insurance business. In December 1941, he enlisted in the United States Navy and was commissioned an officer in 1942, rising to the rank of lieutenant. He served on anti-submarine duty and on a combat minesweeper in the North African and Mediterranean theatres, having participated in the assault on Italy.

Returning to Birmingham after the war, Seibels co-chaired the committee responsible for the safety torch on the Vulcan statue. He received the Distinguished Service Award from the Alabama Jaycees for traffic safety promotion. In 1947, Birmingham won first place in the Jaycees National Safety Award contest with Seibels as chairman of the local Traffic Safety Committee. The George G. Seibels Traffic Safety Award is now given annually by the Jaycees to the traffic safety chairman whose city has had the best program.

Siebels, widely known as a Republican, was elected in the non-partisan election to the Birmingham City Council in 1963. He was part of the progressive slate of council candidates that successfully changed the city charter and ousted "Bull" Connor and his segregationist supporters from City Hall. After a single term on the City Council he was elected mayor in 1967, succeeding the retiring Albert Boutwell, who himself had defeated the notorious "Bull" Connor four years earlier. He served as Mayor from 1967 to 1975 during a period of growth for the city during which Birmingham was designated an "All-American" city. He was narrowly defeated for a third term in 1975 by fellow City Councilman David Vann. Three years later, in 1978 he was elected to the first of three terms representing Jefferson County in the Alabama House of Representatives. As one of the first modern-era Republicans in the legislature he was a vigorous defender of the City of Birmingham. He retired from elective public office in 1990 but remained active in party politics where he was affectionately known as "Mr. Republican" among Alabama GOPers. George Seibels died in Birmingham in March 2000. His final resting place is at the Arlington Antebellum House. In 2003 the Birmingham Zoo renamed its train in his honor.

Preceded by Albert Boutwell	Mayor of Birmingham, Alabama; 1967–1975	Succeeded by David Vann
