= Robert Henley (Birmingham mayor) =

American politician

Robert H. Henley

1st and 4th Mayor of Birmingham, Alabama
- In office December 19, 1871 – April 22, 1873
- Preceded by: Establishment created
- Succeeded by: James Robert Powell

Personal details
- Born: January 20, 1843 Demopolis, Alabama, U.S.
- Died: April 22, 1873 (aged 30) Savannah, Georgia, U.S.
- Spouse: Amelia Peters
- Children: 2

Robert Harwell Henley was the first Mayor of Birmingham, Alabama, from 1871 until 1872.

== Life ==
Robert Henley was born the son of attorney John Woodson Henley on January 20, 1843. He moved with his wife Amelia Peters to Elyton and founded the weekly newspaper Elyton Sun, which later became the Birmingham Sun, the city of Birmingham's first newspaper.

Henley became the first mayor of Birmingham after the city's incorporation on 19 December 1871, appointed by Robert B. Lindsay, the Governor of Alabama at the time.

In 1872, he considered a run for state Senate, but withdrew on account of ill health. He contracted tuberculosis during his term of office and died on April 22, 1873, at the age of 30. He was buried at Oak Hill Cemetery in Birmingham.
