= Birmingham Police Department =

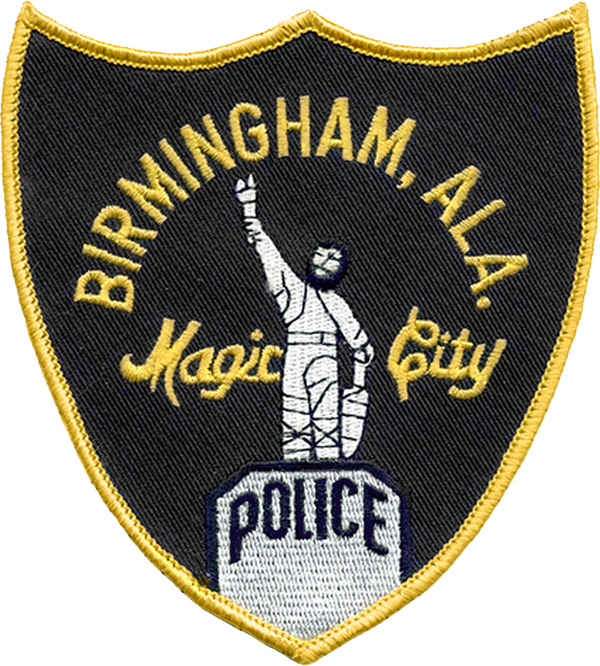
- Patch of the BPD

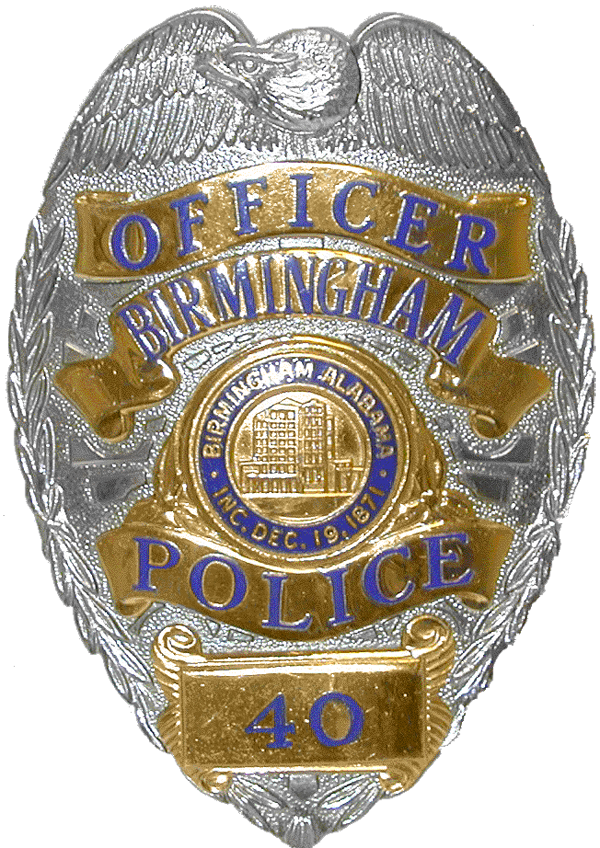
- A BPD Officer's Badge
- Abbreviation: BPD
- Motto: To Protect & Serve

Agency overview
- Formed: 1871
- Employees: 1,100
- Annual budget: $89.4 Million (FY 2019)

Jurisdictional structure
- Operations jurisdiction: Birmingham, Alabama, USA
- Map showing jurisdictional area
- Area: 148.61 square miles (384.9 km^{2})
- Population: 212,237
- Legal jurisdiction: As per operations jurisdiction
- General nature: Local civilian police

Operational structure
- Headquarters: 1710 1st Ave N Birmingham, Alabama, U.S.
- Police officers: 909
- Unsworn members: 260
- Agency executives: Scott Thurmond (FN), Chief of Police; LaQuaylin Parhm, Assistant Chief; Sheila Finley, Deputy Chief of Patrol Operations; Cedric Stevens, Deputy Chief of Investigative Operations
- Bureaus: 3: Administrative Operations; Patrol Operations; Investigative Operations

Facilities
- Precincts: 5: North; South; East; West; Tactical Operations
- Other facilities: 8: City Jail; Airport Substation; School Services Substation; Civic Center Substation; Southwest Substation; Police Academy; Range and Training Facility; Horse Stables

Website
- police.birminghamal.gov

The Birmingham Police Department (BPD) is the police department of the city of Birmingham, Alabama, in the United States. The department operates in an area of 148.61 square miles across two counties (384.91 km^{2}) and a population of 212,237 people.

== History ==
=== Founding and early history ===
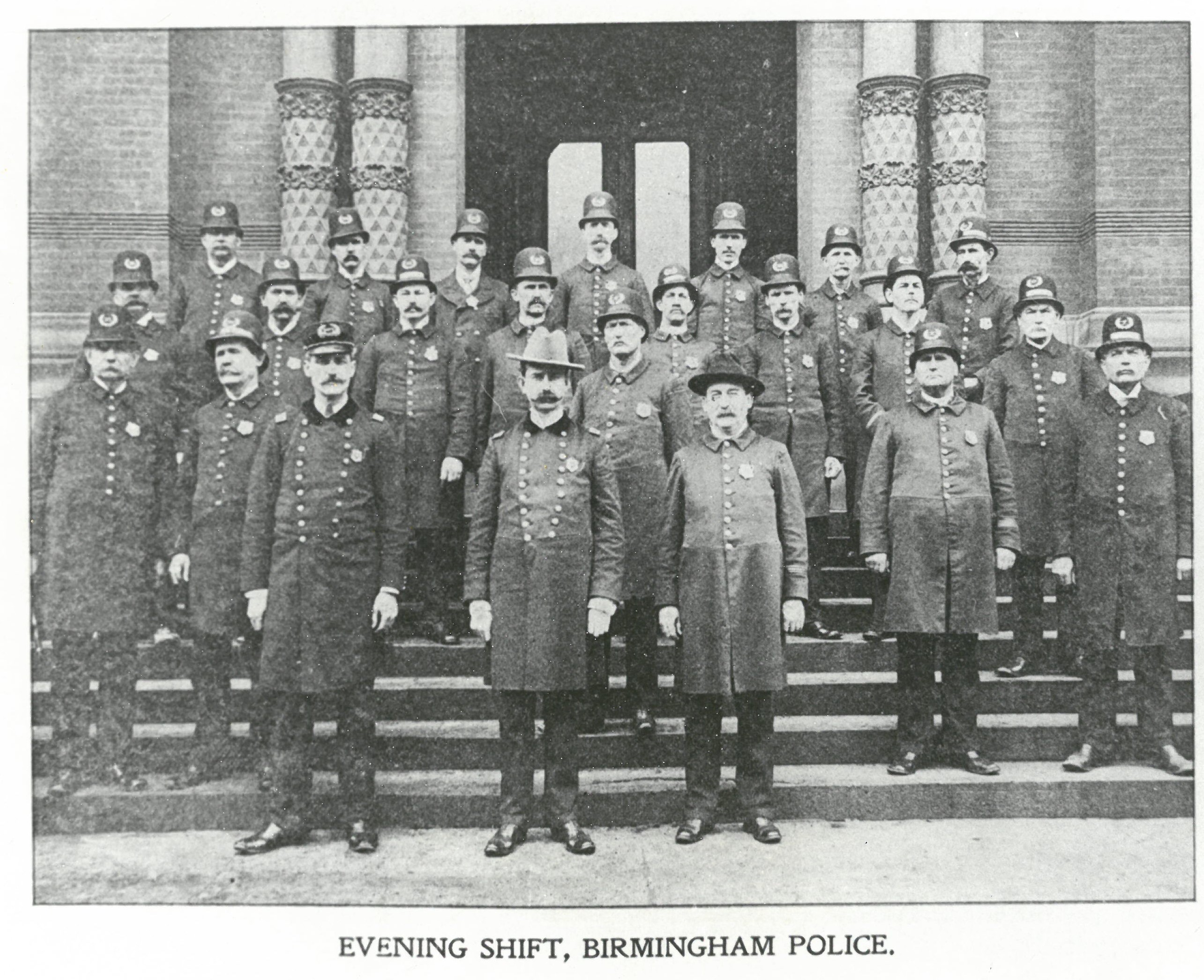
Birmingham Police Evening Shift, Year Unknown

When Birmingham's first city government took office in 1871 under Mayor Robert Henley, he appointed a City Marshal, O. D. Williams, to direct the efforts of two patrolmen, Robert Bailey and Henry Clay Atkins. Henley made himself available to assist with patrols if needed before he was forced to resign due to tuberculosis.

The second administration, under James Powell, took office on January 6, 1873 and installed W. G. Oliver as Marshal. He initially commanding a force of three patrolmen, Ed Taylor, Robert Bailey and A. Robinson, but the young department was expanded with ten new recruits over the course of that year. Those included W. L. Cantelou, Jule Wright, James Armstrong, William Harris, J. D. Lykes, M. Hagerty, William Clay, J. L. Ellison, W. W. Coxe and John Coxe. That force held strong for the next year, but was reduced back to five men, headed by E. G. Taylor, during William Morris' second administration in 1876. Under Thomas Jeffers's administration, it was reduced back to three, with Ben Plosser commanding William Seay and John B. Lewis. Plosser was succeeded by L. M. Teal in 1878.

Mayor A. O. Lane elevated the city government beginning in 1882. He brought W. G. Oliver back as Marshal and also appointed John Thompson to serve as Captain of Police, commanding officers G. W. Merritt, J. A. Brock, J. A. Mingea, W. S. Nelson, J. S. Barksdale, C. K. Dickey, G. J. Tomlin and T. P. Hagood. The annual payroll for the department was $540 in 1882. A new set of uniforms was required to be worn while on duty.

In 1884 Frank Gafford and O. A. Pickard succeeded Oliver and Thompson as Marshal and Captain, respectively. Gafford oversaw the organization of the city's first professional Fire Department in 1885. J. H. Mingea, J. G. Smith, William Burwell, J. B. Donelson, H. U. McKinney, T. J. Boggan, A. H. Maynor and James McGee were sworn in as new officers that term. The department's payroll for 1886 had risen to $970.

For Lane's third term, Pickard was elevated to City Marshal. Newly-sworn officers included J. D. Anderson, Charles Martin, J. M. Nix, W. M. Turner, W. J. Carlisle, A. L. Sexton, R. M. Saunders, W. H. Pinkerton, T. Z. Hagood, Richard Smoot Jr, James Turner, B. R. Childers, Thomas Hart, J. S. Oldham, O. M. Hill, R. H. McCullum and James Hillary. The city's expense for the salaries and operation of the department in 1887 reached $12,500.

The first Birmingham Police officers to lose their lives in the line of duty were George Kirkley and J. W. Adams, who were killed in a shootout following the robbery of the Standard Oil offices on March 27, 1900.

The Birmingham Police Department, with the help of U.S. Steel, vigorously investigated and targeted labor activities during the 1930s and 1940s. Information was fed to a "Red Squad" of detectives "who used the city's vagrancy and criminal-anarchy statutes (liberally reinforced by backroom beatings) to strike at radical labor organizers." In the 1950s, the investigations shifted from labor to civil rights activists.

=== Racial integration ===
In 1963, the Birmingham campaign pushed for racial integration and faced violent responses from the police department, especially with the Children's Crusade. Martin Luther King Jr. wrote his Letter from Birmingham Jail while under arrest in Birmingham during the Civil Rights protests. In 1966 the department hired its first ever black police officer, Leroy Stover, who suffered racial abuse in his first weeks on the force but went on to become Deputy Chief of the department. The second black officer, Johnnie Johnson Jr., hired the day after Stover, went on to become the city's first black chief of police. Johnson was appointed to the post by Richard Arrington, the city's first black mayor, in 1992.

== Organization ==
=== Chief of Police ===
The Chief of Police is a sworn member of the police department appointed by the Mayor of the City of Birmingham. All members of the Birmingham Police Department report to the Chief.

==== Internal Affairs ====
The Internal Affairs unit is responsible for reviewing complaints of officer misconduct. Internal Affairs reports directly to the Chief of Police.

==== Public Information Officer ====
The Public Information Officer's primary responsibility is to provide information to the public and the media regarding the department.

=== Administrative Operations Bureau ===
The Administrative Operations Bureau consists of the Professional Standards Division and Support Services Division as well the Technology, Budget, Inspections, Grants and Parking Enforcement Units.

==== Professional Standards Division ====
The Professional Standards Division consists of the Payroll, Hiring, Accreditation and Training Units.

==== Support Services Division ====
The Support Services Division consists of the Records, Report Review, Property Room and Corrections Units.

=== Field Operations Bureau ===
This unit was formerly called the Patrol Bureau. About half of all the policemen in the department are assigned here. It consists of the five police precincts, the Mayor's Security Detail and the Community Services Division.

==== Community Services Division ====
The Community Services Division consists of Officers Police Support for the Alabama State Fair, Youth Services, Crime Prevention Officers, Chaplains and Community Service Officers.

=== Investigative Operations Bureau ===
The Investigative Operations Bureau consists of the Homicide/Robbery Unit, Crimes Against Property, Vice Narcotics, Special Victims Unit and Forensics Services.

== Rank structure ==
The BPD uses the following rank structure:

| Insignia | Rank title | Information |
|---|---|---|
| | Chief of Police | The Chief of Police is Commander of the Birmingham Police. |
| | Deputy Chief | Deputy Chiefs are Commanders of a Bureau. |
| | Captain | Captains are Commanders of a Precinct or Division. |
| | Lieutenant | Lieutenants are Shift commanders within a Precinct, assistant commanders of a Division, or commanders of a Unit. |
| | Sergeant | Sergeants are Supervisors |
| | Police Officer | |

== Chiefs of Police ==
Since 1871, there have been 34 appointed chiefs of the Birmingham Police Department. W.G. Oliver was appointed twice, serving from 1873 to 1875 and again from 1881 to 1882. Jamie Moore was the longest serving chief of police in Birmingham Police Department History, serving for 16 years.

== Fallen officers ==
Since the establishment of the Birmingham Police Department in 1871, 47 officers have died while on duty.

== See also ==
- Shooting of Johnny Robinson
- Bull Connor
- List of law enforcement agencies in Alabama
