= List of Alpha Epsilon Phi chapters =

Alpha Epsilon Phi is a Jewish sorority in the United States and Canada. In the following list, active chapters are indicated in bold and inactive chapters are indicated in italics.

Chapter	Charter date and range	Institution	City	State	Status	Ref.
Alpha	1909–1913	Barnard College	Manhattan	New York	Inactive	
Beta	1909–1970	Hunter College	New York City	New York	Inactive	
Gamma	1915–1916	Columbia University	New York City	New York	Inactive	
**Delta**	1916	Adelphi University	Garden City	New York	Active	
**Epsilon**	1916	Tulane University	New Orleans	Louisiana	Active	
**Zeta**	1917–1970, 1979	New York University	Manhattan	New York	Active	
**Eta**	1917–1954, 1985–2021, 2025	University at Albany, SUNY	Albany	New York	Active	
Theta	1917–1931, 1959–1970	University of Pennsylvania	Philadelphia	Pennsylvania	Inactive	
**Iota**	1919	Syracuse University	Syracuse	New York	Active	
**Kappa**	1920	Cornell University	Ithaca	New York	Active	
Lambda	1920–1924	University of Denver	Denver	Colorado	Inactive	
**Mu**	1920	University of Illinois Urbana–Champaign	Champaign	Illinois	Active	
**Nu**	1920	University of Pittsburgh	Pittsburgh	Pennsylvania	Active	
Xi	1921–1985, 1990–20xx ?	University of Southern California	Los Angeles	California	Inactive	
Omicron	1921–1988	Northwestern University	Evanston	Illinois	Inactive	
**Pi**	1921–2005, 2010	University of Michigan	Ann Arbor	Michigan	Active	
**Rho**	1921	Ohio State University	Columbus	Ohio	Active	
**Sigma**	1921–1970, 1981	University of Wisconsin–Madison	Madison	Wisconsin	Active	
Tau	1923–1969, 1980–19xx ?	University of California, Berkeley	Berkeley	California	Inactive	
Upsilon	1924–1931	University of Akron	Akron	Ohio	Inactive	
Phi	1924–19xx ?	University of California, Los Angeles	Los Angeles	California	Inactive	
Chi	1924–1965	Vanderbilt University	Nashville	Tennessee	Inactive	
**Psi**	1925	Washington University in St. Louis	St. Louis	Missouri	Active	
**Omega**	1925–1934, 1961	University of Texas at Austin	Austin	Texas	Active	
Alpha Alpha	1927–1952	University of Toronto	Toronto	Ontario	Inactive	
Alpha Beta	1929–1997	University of Missouri	Columbia	Missouri	Inactive	
**Alpha Gamma**	1930–1937, 1958–1970, 1985	George Washington University	Washington	District of Columbia	Active	
Alpha Delta	1932–1987, 2016–2021	University of Washington	Seattle	Washington	Inactive	
Alpha Epsilon	1934–1965, 1977–2004	Duke University	Durham	North Carolina	Inactive	
Alpha Zeta	1937–1978	Pennsylvania State University	State College	Pennsylvania	Inactive	
Alpha Eta	1938–19xx ?	University of Miami	Coral Gables	Florida	Inactive	
Alpha Theta	1938–1984	Louisiana State University	Baton Rouge	Louisiana	Inactive	
Alpha Iota	1938–1978, 2013–2017	University of Minnesota	Minneapolis–Saint Paul	Minnesota	Inactive	
Alpha Kappa	1940–1980, 1987–2004, 2011–2023	Miami University	Oxford	Ohio	Inactive	
**Alpha Lambda**	1940	University of Arizona	Tucson	Arizona	Active	
**Alpha Mu**	1943	University of Maryland, College Park	College Park	Maryland	Active	
Alpha Nu	1943–1971	Carnegie-Mellon University	Pittsburgh	Pennsylvania	Inactive	
**Alpha Xi**	1944–1970, 1977–1983, 2008	University of Connecticut	Storrs	Connecticut	Active	
Alpha Omicron	1945–1970	University of Vermont	Burlington	Vermont	Inactive	
Alpha Pi	1945–1950, 1967–1969	University of South Carolina	Columbia	South Carolina	Inactive	
Alpha Rho	1948–1966	University of Alabama	Tuscaloosa	Alabama	Inactive	
Alpha Sigma	1948–1977	University of Tennessee	Knoxville	Tennessee	Inactive	
**Alpha Tau**	1948	University of Florida	Gainesville	Florida	Active	
Alpha Upsilon	1948–1951, 1968–1976	Purdue University	West Lafayette	Indiana	Inactive	
Alpha Phi	1951–1971, 1981–1984	Ohio University	Athens	Ohio	Inactive	
**Alpha Chi**	1951–1974, 1985	Boston University	Boston	Massachusetts	Active	
Alpha Psi	1952–1971, 1990–199x ?	University of Colorado Boulder	Boulder	Colorado	Inactive	
Alpha Omega	1952–1973	Drake University	Des Moines	Iowa	Inactive	
Epsilon Alpha	1952–1974	Michigan State University	East Lansing	Michigan	Inactive	
**Epsilon Beta**	1954–1976, 1992–2024	Brooklyn College	Brooklyn	New York	Active	
Epsilon Gamma	1956–1979	University of Oklahoma	Norman	Oklahoma	Inactive	
Epsilon Delta	1958–1971	Queens College, CUNY	New York City	New York	Inactive	
**Epsilon Epsilon**	1958	Indiana University	Bloomington	Indiana	Active	
**Epsilon Zeta**	1958–1971, 2018	Arizona State University	Tempe	Arizona	Active	
Epsilon Eta	1959–2011	Emory University	Atlanta	Georgia	Inactive	
**Epsilon Theta**	1959–1970, 1987	American University	Washington	District of Columbia	Active	
Epsilon Iota	1962–1965	New York University-University Heights	University Heights, Bronx	New York	Inactive	
Epsilon Kappa	1962–1965, 1980–1986	University of Rhode Island	Kingston	Rhode Island	Inactive	
Epsilon Lambda	1962–1969	University of Texas at El Paso	El Paso	Texas	Inactive	
**Epsilon Mu**	1962–1972, 19xx ?	C.W. Post College	Brookville	New York	Active	
Epsilon Nu	1964–1970, 2008–2014	San Diego State University	San Diego	California	Inactive	
Epsilon Xi	1965–1970, 1980–1984	Kent State University	Kent	Ohio	Inactive	
Epsilon Omicron	1966–1971	City University of New York	New York City	New York	Inactive	
Epsilon Pi	1966–1971	California State University, Long Beach	Long Beach	California	Inactive	
Epsilon Rho	1966–1969	San Jose State University	San Jose	California	Inactive	
Epsilon Sigma	1968–1973	California State, Northridge	Los Angeles	California	Inactive	
Epsilon Tau	1968–1971, 1993–2015	University of California, Santa Barbara	Santa Barbara	California	Inactive	
Epsilon Phi	1968–1974, 2006–2025	University of Iowa	Iowa City	Iowa	Inactive	
Epsilon Chi	1968–1983	Bradley University	Peoria	Illinois	Inactive	
Epsilon Psi	1968–1980	University of South Florida	Tampa	Florida	Inactive	
Epsilon Omega	1969–1971	Southern Methodist University	Dallas	Texas	Inactive	
Phi Alpha	1969–1972	Eastern Michigan University	Ypsilanti	Michigan	Inactive	
Phi Beta	1969–1977	Old Dominion University	Norfolk	Virginia	Inactive	
Phi Gamma	1970–1973	University of Kansas	Lawrence	Kansas	Inactive	
Phi Delta	1976–1979	Florida State University	Tallahassee	Florida	Inactive	
Phi Epsilon	1980–199x ?	University of California, Davis	Davis	California	Inactive	
Phi Zeta	1982–1989	Southern Illinois University	Carbondale	Illinois	Inactive	
**Phi Eta**	1983	Jacksonville University	Jacksonville	Florida	Active	
**Phi Theta**	1984	Temple University	Philadelphia	Pennsylvania	Active	
Phi Iota	1984–2008	University of Hartford	West Hartford	Connecticut	Inactive	
**Phi Kappa**	1985	Rowan University	Glassboro	New Jersey	Active	
Phi Lambda	1985–2009	University at Buffalo	Amherst	New York	Inactive	
**Phi Mu**	1985	Binghamton University	Binghamton	New York	Active	
**Phi Nu**	1985	State University of New York at Oswego	Oswego	New York	Active	
Phi Xi	1987-2024	Fairleigh Dickinson University	Teaneck	New Jersey	Inactive	
Phi Omicron	1987–1990	York University	Toronto	Ontario	Inactive	
Phi Pi	1987–2004	State University of New York at Oneonta	Oneonta	New York	Inactive	
Phi Rho	1988–2003	Cleveland State University	Cleveland	Ohio	Inactive	
**Phi Sigma**	1988	Wayne State University	Detroit	Michigan	Active	
**Phi Tau**	1988	State University of New York at Plattsburgh	Plattsburgh	New York	Active	
**Phi Upsilon**	1989	Hofstra University	Hempstead	New York	Active	
**Phi Phi**	1989	State University of New York at New Paltz	New Paltz	New York	Active	
**Phi Chi**	1989	University of Delaware	Newark	Delaware	Active	
Phi Psi	1989–200x ?	University of Bridgeport	Bridgeport	Connecticut	Inactive	
**Phi Omega**	1990	Northeastern University	Boston	Massachusetts	Active	
**Beta Alpha**	1991	Emerson College	Boston	Massachusetts	Active	
**Beta Beta**	1991	University of Massachusetts Amherst	Amherst	Massachusetts	Active	
**Beta Gamma**	1992	Buffalo State College	Buffalo	New York	Active	
Beta Delta	1995–200x ?	Yale University	New Haven	Connecticut	Inactive	
Beta Epsilon	1995-2022	Massachusetts Institute of Technology	Cambridge	Massachusetts	Inactive	
**Beta Zeta**	2006	University of Central Florida	Orlando	Florida	Active	
**Beta Eta**	2006	University of California, San Diego	San Diego	California	Active	
Beta Theta	2009–2017	Virginia Commonwealth University	Richmond	Virginia	Inactive	
Beta Iota	2010–2017	Stanford University	Stanford	California	Inactive	
Beta Kappa	2010-2022	University of California, Irvine	Irvine	California	Inactive	
**Beta Lambda**	2014	California Polytechnic State University	San Luis Obispo	California	Active	
Beta Nu	2015-2022	Towson University	Towson	Maryland	Inactive	
**Beta Xi**	2017	Texas A&M University	College Station	Texas	Active	
**Beta Pi**	2020	Concordia University	Montreal	Quebec	Active	
**Beta Rho**	2025	Elon University	Elon	North Carolina	Active	
