= Albert Boutwell =

American politician (1904–1978)

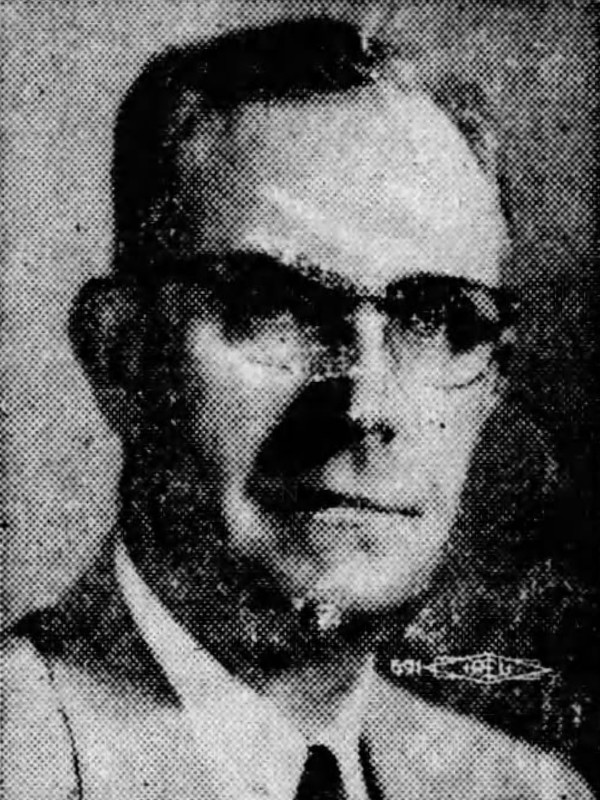
- Boutwell c. 1961

19th Lieutenant Governor of Alabama
- In office January 19, 1959 – January 14, 1963
- Governor: John M. Patterson
- Preceded by: William G. Hardwick
- Succeeded by: James B. Allen

22nd Mayor of Birmingham, Alabama
- In office 1963–1967
- Preceded by: Art Hanes
- Succeeded by: George G. Siebels, Jr.

Member of the Alabama Senate
- In office 1946–1958
- Succeeded by: Larry Dumas
- Constituency: 13th

Personal details
- Born: November 13, 1904 Montgomery, Alabama
- Died: February 3, 1978 (aged 73) Birmingham, Alabama
- Party: Democratic
- Spouse: Helen Balfour Drake(m. November 23, 1934)
- Children: 3; including Drake
- Education: University of Alabama
- Profession: Lawyer

Albert Burton Boutwell (November 13, 1904 – February 3, 1978) was the 19th lieutenant governor of Alabama. A Democrat, Boutwell served Governor John Malcolm Patterson of the same political party, from 1959 until 1963. Earlier in his political career he served in the state senate, including as senate president, and later as mayor of Birmingham.

== Early life and education ==
Boutwell was born in Montgomery, Alabama in 1904. Both his grandfathers were Confederate veterans. He graduated from the then-segregated Greenville High School, and then attended the University of Alabama, receiving a Bachelor of Law degree in 1928. While attending university, Boutwell was a member of two fraternities: the Sigma Delta Kappa law fraternity and the Alpha Epsilon Phi honorary Forensic Fraternity. In his final year, Boutwell was also President of the Student Government Association and other groups.

== Career ==
After admission to the Alabama bar, Boutwell practiced law in Birmingham, for many years, first with Sam Pointer during the Great Depression, then with Burgin Hawkins, as Bouthwell, Pointer & Hawkins. He was also active in the Birmingham Junior Chamber of Commerce (once becoming its president, and also becoming a national vice-president). He was also active in his Methodist Church, as well as the Elk, and Mason fraternal organizations.

Beginning in 1939, Boutwell was elected to the state Democratic Committee, representing District 9. In 1944, he was one of Alabama's representatives at the National Democratic Convention. He also twice served as chair of his state party's finance committee.

Boutwell first won election in 1946, as Birmingham voters elected him to the Alabama Senate. After he won re-election in 1950, fellow senators elected Boutwell as their president pro-tem. During his third four-year term, Boutwell served as Chairman of the Interim Legislative Committee on Segregation in the Public Schools, and actively opposed school integration. In response to the U.S. Supreme Court desegregation decisions in Brown v. Board of Education, secured passage of a pupil placement act designed to maintain segregation.

He won statewide office, as lieutenant governor, in 1958.

Considered a moderate by many in Birmingham early in the civil rights movement, Boutwell was elected to the City Commission on April 2, 1963; he was selected as President of the Commission, equivalent to mayor under that system. His election was seen as a rejection of vehement segregationist Eugene "Bull" Connor. Connor attributed his loss by 7,982 votes to a 10,000-strong “Negro bloc vote”; and in fact Fred Shuttlesworth had delayed mass demonstrations of the "Birmingham Campaign" until after the election. Martin Luther King Jr.'s April 1963 "Letter from Birmingham Jail" mentioned Boutwell; King had been arrested on Good Friday after Boutwell had vowed to arrest, jail and punish anyone who disturbed the public peace and safety. Connor in fact met those demonstrations with police dogs and fire hoses, and the movement's leaders and Birmingham businessmen declared a truce on May 10. Later that year, Boutwell declared that school integration was not in children's interest. He was in office for the forced integration of Birmingham schools by the National Guard and the bombing of 16th Street Baptist Church, which killed four young girls.

Boutwell was defeated for re-election in 1967. His pupil placement act and its popular (among segregationists) freedom of choice provision were declared unconstitutional by federal courts in 1967.

== Personal life ==
In 1934, Boutwell married Helen Balfour. They had a daughter and two sons

== Death and legacy ==
Boutwell died in Birmingham. The Municipal Auditorium was renamed in his honor.

Party political offices
Preceded by William G. Hardwick	Democratic nominee for Lieutenant Governor of Alabama; 1958	Succeeded by James Allen
Political offices
Preceded by William G. Hardwick	Lieutenant Governor of Alabama; 1959–1963	Succeeded by James B. Allen
Preceded by Art Hanes	Mayor of Birmingham, Alabama; 1963 — 1967	Succeeded by George Siebels
