= James R. Powell (politician) =

American city founder and Alabama politician

Colonel James R. Powell
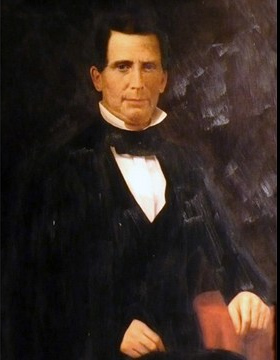

Mayor of Birmingham
- In office January 6, 1873 – December 31, 1875
- Governor: David P. Lewis (1872–1874), George S. Houston (1874–1878)
- Preceded by: Thomas Tate
- Succeeded by: William Morris

Member of the Alabama Senate, District 15 (Coosa County)
- In office 1855–1857
- Governor: John A. Winston
- Succeeded by: Daniel Crawford

Member of the Alabama Senate, District 15 (Coosa County)
- In office 1853–1855
- Governor: John A. Winston
- Preceded by: Seth P. Storrs (counties of Coosa and Autaga)

Member of the Alabama House of Representatives, (Coosa County)
- In office 1845–1846 Serving with Howell Rose
- Governor: Joshua L. Martin
- Preceded by: None (new seat)
- Succeeded by: Samuel Spigner, Daniel Crawford

Sheriff, Coosa County
- In office August 1842 – August 1845
- Governor: Benjamin Fitzpatrick
- Preceded by: Alexander Smith
- Succeeded by: James H. Weaver

Personal details
- Born: James Robert Powell; December 7, 1814 Brunswick County, Virginia
- Died: December 10, 1883 (aged 69) Washington County, Mississippi
- Cause of death: Gunshot wound
- Resting place: Oakwood Cemetery (Montgomery, Alabama)
- Spouse: Mary Jane Smythe (m. 1858–1883)
- Children: Mary (1860-1930)
- Moniker: The Duke of Birmingham

Colonel James Robert Powell (1814–1883) was a founder of the city of Birmingham, Alabama, and the city's first elected mayor (1873–1875). Before that, he held office in the Alabama State Senate (1853–1856) and the Alabama House of Representatives (1845–1846). He also held the office of Sheriff of the County of Coosa, Alabama, from 1842 to 1845. He became well known as "The Duke of Birmingham" because of his "... remarkable activities as a pioneer in the early history of the city."

== Early life ==
Powell was born on December 7, 1814, in Brunswick County of the Commonwealth of Virginia to Addison Powell (d. 1840) and Catherine R. Powell (d. 1858). Being successful agriculturalists, his family was quite wealthy up until about 1830. In 1833, he moved to Alabama where he worked as an academy teacher in Lowndes County. Later, in partnership with his father, who had moved to Alabama at the urging of this particular son, he was a successful hotel keeper in the state's capital city, Montgomery. By 1836, he had moved to Wetumpka in Coosa County, where he became involved in a stage line, which he owned and managed himself and which had contracts for mail delivery in and around the entire state and as far north as Virginia. While living in Wetumpka, he was elected as Sheriff of Coosa County in August 1842 and served until August 1845. After that, he was elected to represent the county of Coosa in the Alabama House of Representatives in 1845. After serving one term in the House, he returned to Montgomery and in 1855 won election to the State Senate. On December 14, 1858, after serving two terms in the Senate, he was married to Mary Jane Smythe (1825–1902) of Tennessee. February 19, 1860, saw the birth of their only child, daughter Mary Powell (1860-1930).

== Military service ==
Little historical record is found concerning Powell's military service, but it is clear from the various references that he was addressed by many as "Colonel." It is also clear that he did not serve in the U.S. Civil War, but remained in Coosa County with his mother and sisters during the war. He did, however, have some involvement with the state militia in 1851 while living in Rockford, Alabama. Reverend George E. Brewer gives the following account of a time in when a military drill of the 68th Regiment (3rd Brigade, 7th Division, Alabama Militia) was held on an empty field owned by Colonel Powell,

The last brigade drill of the militia remembered by the writer was at Rockford in the summer of 1851, while Governor Chapman was the militia chief of Alabama. Gen. M. L. Bulger was commander of the brigade. The drill took place along the streets, and then to the uncultivated field of Col. J. R. Powell, south of his house. A fence was between the road and field, and sentinels were placed along it to keep out intruders. A broad gap was made in the fence to let the ranks of the military through. After they had entered, the sentinels placed here were instructed to let none pass without the countersign. When the drill was finished and they were ready to be reviewed by the Governor and his staff, as they rode to the opening for entrance, they were stopped by the guard who demanded the countersign. The Governor claimed the right to enter as commander-in-chief but the sentinel held him at bay until the officer of the guard came to his relief.

== Elyton Land Company and the founding of Birmingham ==
On December 20, 1870, Powell and nine other men from in and around the Montgomery area, including a man named Josiah Morris organized a company called the Elyton Land Company for the purpose of "... buying lands and selling lots ... and affecting the building of a city, at or near the town of Elyton, in the County of Jefferson and State of Alabama." The corporation was funded by the sale of 2,000 shares of capital stock valued at $200,000., distributed as follows. These ten men were to be the founders of the new city to be established.

Initial shareholders of the Elyton Land Company
Shareholder	Residence	Shares held	Ownership interest
Josiah Morris	Montgomery	437	20.5%
James Powell	Montgomery	360	16.9%
Samuel Tate	Memphis	360	16.9%
William Mudd	Jefferson County	180	8.5%
William Nabers	Jefferson County	180	8.5%
Benjamin P. Worthington	Jefferson County	133	6.2%
Henry Caldwell	Montgomery	120	5.6%
James Gilmer	Montgomery	120	5.6%
Bolling Hall	Montgomery	120	5.6%
Campbell Wallace	Atlanta	120	5.6%

Josiah Morris worked for the South and North Alabama Railroad which was currently under construction between Decatur and Montgomery, and would have to cross the Alabama and Chattanooga Railroad which had already been completed from Chattanooga to about Tuskaloosa. Knowing that the crossing would be in the Jones Valley near Elyton, he had previously agreed to purchase 4,150 acres of land east of Elyton from William Nabers and his wife Elizabeth for $25 per acre in cash and stock in the company to be formed.

On January 27, 1871, when the board of directors of the newly-formed corporation held its first meeting, Powell was unanimously named president of the company, and the shareholders in another meeting that same day declared in its bylaws that "The city to be built by the Elyton Land Company, near Elyton, in the County of Jefferson, State of Alabama shall be called 'Birmingham'." Powell immediately relocated to the site of the new city and set up an office in a house owned by the Alabama and Chattanooga Railroad on the south side of the tracks adjacent to where the historic Union Passenger Depot was built and still stands. As of October 2020, portions of South Powell Avenue still exist at this location and can be seen on area maps.

Upon arriving at the location, engineers began surveying the property and laying out the city streets under Powell's direction, and he negotiated with a supplier from Montgomery to make a large quantity of brick available for the building of houses and other uses. He raised money for and arranged for the building of a hotel, a thirty-room frame structure on Nineteenth Street called the Relay House. On September 25, 1872, the board of directors of the Elyton Land Company ordered Powell to build a water works for the new city, and eight months later the water supply to the town was turned on.
