= Bull Connor =

American government official and segregationist (1897–1973)

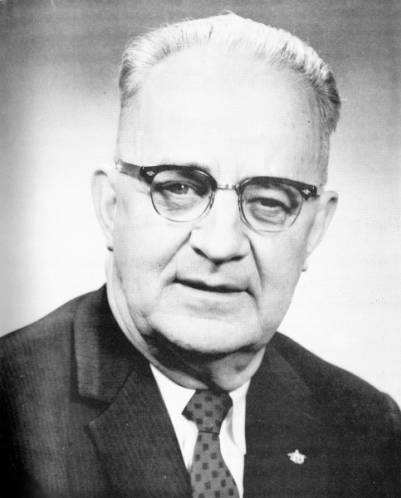
- Connor in 1960

President of the Alabama Public Service Commission
- In office January 18, 1965 – January 17, 1972
- Preceded by: Jack Owen
- Succeeded by: Kenneth Hammond

Birmingham Commissioner of Public Safety
- In office November 4, 1957 – 1963
- Preceded by: Robert Lindbergh
- Succeeded by: Position abolished
- In office 1937–1954
- Preceded by: W. O. Downs
- Succeeded by: Robert Lindbergh

Member of the Alabama House of Representatives for Jefferson County
- In office 1935–1937

Personal details
- Born: Theophilus Eugene Connor; July 11, 1897 Selma, Alabama, U.S.
- Died: March 10, 1973 (aged 75) Birmingham, Alabama, U.S.
- Party: Democratic
- Other political affiliations: Dixiecrat
- Spouse: Beara Levens
- Children: 2

Theophilus Eugene "Bull" Connor (July 11, 1897 – March 10, 1973) was an American politician who was Commissioner of Public Safety for the city of Birmingham, Alabama, for more than two decades. A lifelong member of the Democratic Party, he strongly opposed the Civil Rights Movement in the 1960s. Under the city commission government, Connor had responsibility for administrative oversight of the Birmingham Fire Department and the Birmingham Police Department, which also had their own chiefs.

As a white supremacist, Bull Connor enforced legal racial segregation and denied civil rights to Black citizens, especially during 1963's Birmingham campaign led by the Southern Christian Leadership Conference. He is well known for directing the use of fire hoses and police attack dogs against protestors, including against children and student civil rights activists. National media broadcast these tactics on television, horrifying much of the world. The outrages served as catalysts for major social and legal change in the Southern United States and contributed to passage by the United States Congress of the Civil Rights Act of 1964.

== Early life ==
Connor was born in 1897 in Selma, Alabama, the son of Molly (Godwin) and Hugh King Connor, a train dispatcher and telegraph operator.

== Career ==
He entered politics as a Democrat in 1934 winning a seat in the Alabama House of Representatives and maintained that party affiliation throughout his career. As a legislator, he voted for extending the poll tax, which served as a barrier to voter registration by blacks, and against an anti-sedition bill intended to stifle union activity. He did not stand for a second term in 1936, instead running for Commissioner of Public Safety for the City of Birmingham. Concurrently during this period, Connor served as the radio play-by-play broadcaster of the minor league Birmingham Barons baseball club spanning the 1932 through 1936 seasons. Willie Mays remembered listening to him call games: "Pretty good announcer, too, although I think he used to get too excited."

=== Commissioner of Public Safety (1936–1954, 1957–1963) ===
In 1936, Connor was elected to the office of commissioner of Public Safety of Birmingham, beginning the first of two stretches that spanned a total of 26 years. His first stretch ended in 1952, but he was re-elected in 1956, and was sworn in on November 4, 1957, where he served until 1963.

At a meeting of the Southern Conference for Human Welfare in 1938, Eleanor Roosevelt refused Connor's directions to follow local segregation laws by sitting in the black section of a Birmingham auditorium.

In 1938, Connor ran as a candidate for Governor of Alabama. He announced he would be campaigning on a platform of "protecting employment practices, law enforcement, segregation and other problems that have been historically classified as states' rights by the Democratic party".

In 1948, Connor's officers arrested the U.S. Senator from Idaho, Glen H. Taylor. Taylor was the running mate of Progressive Party presidential candidate Henry Wallace, former Democratic vice president (1941 to 1945) with Franklin D. Roosevelt. Taylor, who had attempted to speak to the Southern Negro Youth Congress, was arrested for violating Birmingham's racial segregation laws. Connor's effort to enforce the law was caused by the group's reported communist philosophy, with Connor noting at the time, "There's not enough room in town for Bull and the Commies."

During the 1948 Democratic National Convention, Connor led the Alabama delegation in a walkout when the national party included a civil rights plank in its platform. The offshoot States' Rights Democratic Party (Dixiecrats) nominated Strom Thurmond for president at its convention in Birmingham's Municipal Auditorium.

Connor's second run for governor failed in 1954. He was the center of controversy that year by pushing through a city ordinance in Birmingham that outlawed "communism."

=== Civil rights era ===
Before returning to office in 1956, Connor quickly resumed his brutal approach to dealing with perceived threats to the social order. His forces raided a meeting which was being held at the house of African-American activist Reverend Fred Shuttlesworth, where three Montgomery ministers were in attendance. He feared that the Montgomery bus boycott, which was underway, would spread to Birmingham, in an effort to integrate city buses. He had the ministers arrested on charges of vagrancy, which meant that they were not allowed to pay bail, nor were they allowed to receive any visitors during the first three days of their incarceration. A federal investigation followed, but Connor refused to cooperate.

In 1960, Connor was elected Democratic National Committeeman for Alabama, soon after filing a civil lawsuit against The New York Times for $1.5 million. He objected to what he claimed was their insinuation that he had promoted racial hatred. He dropped his claim for damages to $400,000; the case dragged on for six years until Connor lost a $40,000 judgment on appeal.

=== Freedom Riders ===
In the spring of 1961, integrated teams of civil rights activists mounted what they called "Freedom Rides" to highlight the illegal imposition of racial segregation on interstate buses, whose operations came under federal law and the constitution. They had teams ride Greyhound and Trailways buses traveling through southern capitals, with the final stop intended as New Orleans. The teams encountered increasing hostility and violence as they made their way deeper into the South.

On May 2, 1961, Connor had won a landslide election for his sixth term as Commissioner of Public Safety in Birmingham. As Commissioner, he had administrative authority over the police and fire departments, schools, public health service, and libraries, all of which were segregated by state law. Tom King, a candidate running for mayor of Birmingham, met with Connor on May 8, 1961, to pay his respects. In addition, he asked him to refrain from announcing support for the other leading mayoral candidate, Art Hanes, so that King's chances would be greater. At the end of the meeting, Connor noted that he was expecting the Freedom Riders to reach Birmingham the following Sunday, Mother's Day. He stated, "We'll be ready for them, too," and King responded, "I bet you will, Commissioner," as he walked out.

After a stop in Anniston, Alabama, the Greyhound bus of the Freedom Riders was attacked. They were offered no police protection. After they left town, they were forced to stop by a violent mob that firebombed and burned the bus, but no activists were fatally hurt. A new Greyhound bus was placed into service and departed for Birmingham. The activists on the earlier Trailways bus had been accosted by Ku Klux Klan members who boarded the bus in Atlanta and beat up the activists, pushing them all to the back of the bus.

The Freedom Riders arrived in Birmingham on May 14, 1961. As the Trailways bus reached the terminal in Birmingham, a large mob of Klansmen and news reporters was waiting for them. The Riders were viciously attacked soon after they disembarked from the bus and attempted to gain service at the whites-only lunch counter. Some were taken to the loading dock area, away from reporters, but some reporters were also beaten with metal bars, pipes, and bats and one's camera was destroyed. After 15 minutes, the police finally arrived, but by then most Klansmen had left.

Connor intentionally let the Klansmen beat the Riders for 15 minutes with no police intervention. He publicly blamed the violence on many factors, saying that "No policemen were in sight as the buses arrived, because they were visiting their mothers on Mother's Day". He insisted that the violence came from out-of-town meddlers and that police had rushed to the scene "as quickly as possible." The violence was covered by national media.

He said:

As I have said on numerous occasions, we are not going to stand for this in Birmingham. And if necessary we will fill the jail full and we don't care whose toes we step on. I am saying now to these meddlers from out of our city the best thing for them to do is stay out if they don't want to get slapped in jail. Our people of Birmingham are a peaceful people and we never have any trouble here unless some people come into our city looking for trouble. And I've never seen anyone yet look for trouble who wasn't able to find it.

In 1962, Connor ordered the closing of 60 Birmingham parks rather than follow a federal court order to desegregate public facilities.

In November 1962, in response to the extremely negative perception of the city—it was derisively nicknamed "Bombingham" by outsiders for the numerous attacks on the homes and churches of black civil rights activists—Birmingham voters changed the city's form of government. Rather than an at-large election of three commissioners, who had specific oversight of certain city departments, there would be a mayor-council form of government. Members of the city council were to be elected from nine single-member districts. Blacks were still largely disenfranchised. For instance, in 1961 when the president of the city's Chamber of Commerce was visiting Japan, he saw a newspaper photo of a bus engulfed in flames, which occurred during the Freedom Rides. Bull Connor had arranged for opponents to have time to attack civil rights activists when their bus reached Birmingham.

Endorsed by Governor George C. Wallace, Connor attempted to run for mayor, but lost on April 2, 1963. Connor and his fellow commissioners filed suit to block the change in power, but on May 23, 1963, the Supreme Court of Alabama ruled against them. Connor ended his 23-year tenure in the post. Citing a general law, he had argued that the change could not take effect until the October 1 following the date of the election, but the Supreme Court of Alabama held that the general law was preempted by a special law applicable to only the City of Birmingham.

=== Birmingham campaign ===
Local civil rights activists had been unable to negotiate much change with the city or business leaders, in their efforts to gain integration of facilities and hiring of blacks by local businesses. They invited Dr. Martin Luther King Jr. and his team to help mount a more concerted campaign. The day after the April election, Dr. King and local civil rights leaders began "Project 'C'" (for "confrontation") against the Birmingham business community. They used economic boycotts and demonstrations to seek integration of stores and job opportunities. Throughout April 1963, King led smaller demonstrations, which resulted in his arrest along with many others.

King wanted to have massive arrests to highlight the brutal police tactics used by Connor and his subordinates. (By extension, the campaign was intended to demonstrate the general suppression by other Southern police officials as well). After King was arrested and jailed, he wrote his Letter from Birmingham Jail, which became noted as a moral argument for civil rights activism. The goal of the campaign was to gain mass arrests of non-violent protesters and overwhelm the judicial and penal systems. It would also demonstrate to national media and local residents the strong desire of African Americans to exercise their constitutional rights as citizens.

=== Children's Crusade ===
In the final phase of Project C, the Southern Christian Leadership Conference's James Bevel introduced a controversial new tactic of using young people in the demonstrations. Most adults were working for bosses who openly threatened their jobs with termination for participating in the demonstrations. On May 2, 1963, the first youths and students walked out of the 16th Street Baptist Church and attempted to march to Birmingham's City Hall to talk to the Mayor. By the end of the day, 959 children, ranging from ages 6–18, had been arrested.

The next day, even more students joined the marches, against whom Connor ordered the use of fire hoses and attack dogs. This did not stop the demonstrators, but generated bad publicity for Connor through the news media. The use of fire hoses continued and by May 7, Connor and the police department had detained more than 3,000 demonstrators.

The Black Americans' economic boycott of businesses that refused to hire them and downtown stores that kept segregated facilities helped gain negotiation by the city's business leaders. The SCLC and the Senior Citizens Committee, who represented a majority of Birmingham businesses, came to an agreement. On May 10, they agreed on desegregation of lunch counters, restrooms, fitting rooms, and drinking fountains at department stores, the upgrading in position and hiring of blacks, cooperation with SCLC legal representatives in releasing all detainees, and the establishment of formal communication between black and whites through the Senior Citizens Committee.

== Later life and death ==
On June 3, 1964, Connor resumed a place in government when he was elected president of the Alabama Public Service Commission in the 1964 Alabama Public Service Commission election. He suffered a stroke on December 7, 1966, and used a wheelchair for the rest of his life. Connor won another term in 1968, but was defeated in 1972.

He suffered another stroke on February 26, 1973, which left him unconscious. He died a few weeks later, in March of that year. Survivors included his widow, Beara, a daughter, and a brother, Ed Connor.

== In popular culture ==
- Connor is mentioned in contemporary folk singer Phil Ochs's 1965 song "Talking Birmingham Jam".
- Connor is played by Kenneth McMillan in the 1978 television miniseries King.
- Spike Lee's 1997 documentary 4 Little Girls, which is about the 16th Street Baptist Church bombing, includes footage of Connor and interviews with people describing police tactics during his tenure.
- Footage of Connor appears in the 1999 film Our Friend, Martin, in which he is voiced by veteran voice artist Frank Welker.
- Connor is cited by name in the 2014 film Selma as an example of a particular type of bullying public official and police officer whose tolerance, or encouragement, of violence towards Civil Rights campaigners plays into the hands of the media-conscious SCLC and Martin Luther King Jr.
- Connor is referenced in the syndicated comic strip The Boondocks, where Huey Freeman mistakes a man washing his car for Connor. Connor also appears as an antagonist in the 2014 episode "Freedom Ride or Die" in the animated TV series based on the strip.
- Connor is framed as an antagonist in John Lewis's graphic novel memoir series March, appearing in the 2015 second novel of the trilogy as an opposition to the Freedom Riders and general racial equality.
- In the 2004 remake of The Ladykillers, the character played by J. K. Simmons stands up to another character and says, 'You don't scare me, Bull Connor and his dogs didn't scare me.'
