= Lola Hendricks =

American activist (1932–2013)

Lola H. Hendricks
- Born: Lola Mae Haynes; December 19, 1932; Birmingham, Alabama, U.S.
- Died: May 17, 2013 (aged 80)
- Occupations: Clerk-typist, Secretary
- Employer(s): Social Security Administration, Equal Employment Opportunity Commission
- Organization(s): Alabama Christian Movement for Human Rights, Southern Conference Education Fund, Southern Christian Leadership Conference, Birmingham Civil Rights Institute

Lola Mae Haynes Hendricks (née Haynes) (December 19, 1932 – May 17, 2013) was corresponding secretary for Fred Shuttlesworth's Alabama Christian Movement for Human Rights from 1956 to 1963. She assisted Wyatt Walker in planning the early portions of the Southern Christian Leadership Conference's involvement in the 1963 Birmingham campaign during the Civil Rights Movement.

== Early life ==
On December 19, 1932, Lola Mae Haynes, the first of two daughters, was born to Buford and Addie Hanes. Lola Mae Haynes was born in Birmingham, Alabama on 4th Avenue and 15th Street South on the south side of Birmingham. Her father was employed as a coal-truck driver from LaGrange, Georgia and her mother, from Chambers County, Alabama, worked as a domestic cook. Lola Mae Haynes went to school in Birmingham at Cameron Elementary School, graduated, and then went to Ullman High School for two years. In 1949, Haynes attended Parker High School for two years and graduated in January of '51. After graduating from Parker High School, she began working as an elevator operator at Hillman Hospital, now called University Hospital. Lola Mae Haynes saved her money from the hospital for a year, until she was able to enroll herself in beauty school in 1952 where she attended the Ruth Porter's School of Beauty Culture.

In February 1953, Lola Mae Haynes married Joe Hendricks. Lola then went on to study for two years at the Booker T. Washington Business College. After graduating from Booker T. Washington Business College, Lola began employment in the insurance industry at Alexander & Company. The company, owned by John J. Drew and his wife Deanie, had employed Lola Mae Haynes Hendricks as a clerk-typist and an insurance writer. In 1963, Haynes began working for the Federal Government under the Social Security Administration, where she became one of the first African Americans to integrate amongst the whites into the workforce. Hendricks worked in files for about two years, and then was promoted to Clerk Typing and again, to Award Typing.

== Civil Rights Movement ==
The Hendrickses were members of the National Association for the Advancement of Colored People (NAACP). When the group was outlawed by the State of Alabama in 1956 she became one of the early members of the Alabama Christian Movement for Human Rights, joining at a mass meeting at Nelson Smith's New Pilgrim Baptist Church where she was a member. The ACMHR, led by Shuttlesworth, organized local boycotts and demonstrations as well as coordinating legal challenges to Birmingham's segregation laws in the 1950s and 1960s. Hendricks and her husband were the named parties in ACMHR-backed lawsuits to force integration of Birmingham city parks and to desegregate the Birmingham Public Library. She also served as the organization's correspondence secretary, working from Shuttleworth's office at Bethel Baptist Church from 1956 until the culmination of the Birmingham Campaign. In December 1962 she traveled to New England as a field director for the Southern Conference Education Fund, raising awareness among Northerners about the realities of Southern segregation and soliciting donations of Christmas toys for movement members boycotting Birmingham's department stores.

In the Spring of 1963, Hendricks coordinated the practical office requirements and cultivated local contacts for the combined efforts of the ACMHR and the Southern Christian Leadership Conference (SCLC), which Shuttlesworth had co-founded and which was chaired by Martin Luther King Jr. She worked directly with the SCLC's Wyatt Walker during the campaign, helping organize support and logistics for marches and department store boycotts.

It was Hendricks who applied directly to Public Safety Commissioner Eugene "Bull" Connor for a parade permit for the first day of marches and was told "You will not get a permit in Birmingham, Alabama to picket. I'll picket you over to the jail." At Walker's urging she did not actively demonstrate and risk jailing, protecting her behind-the-scenes importance to the movement. Hendricks' nine-year-old daughter, Audrey Faye Hendricks (1952–2009), however, was the only child in her class to participate in the May 2, 1963 "Children's Crusade" that brought national attention to Connor's brutal tactics against demonstrators. She spent five nights in jail as minders got word out to her parents that she was safe. She was the youngest known child to be arrested for that protest. The children's book The Youngest Marcher: The Story of Audrey Faye Hendricks, A Young Civil Rights Activist (2017) by Cynthia Levinson, is about that. That book also contains a recipe for Lola Hendricks's "Hot Rolls Baptized in Butter".

== Later life ==
Hendricks left her insurance company job in 1963 to join the newly integrated Birmingham office of the Social Security Administration. She was hired originally as a filer but was promoted to the unit clerk before moving to the Equal Employment Opportunity Commission where she became a supervisor. She left in 1983 to care for her mother. In 1988 she rejoined the Social Security Administration where she worked until reaching retirement. She continued to volunteer at the Birmingham Civil Rights Institute and in the mid-1990s she assisted the Birmingham Historical Society in researching movement churches and landmarks for National Register of Historic Places status.

She had two sisters (one predeceased her), two daughters, Audrey Faye Hendricks (1953–2009) and Jan Hendricks Fuller, and one grandson, Joel A. Fuller.

== See also ==
- List of civil rights leaders
