= Birmingham Public Library =

Public library in Birmingham, Alabama

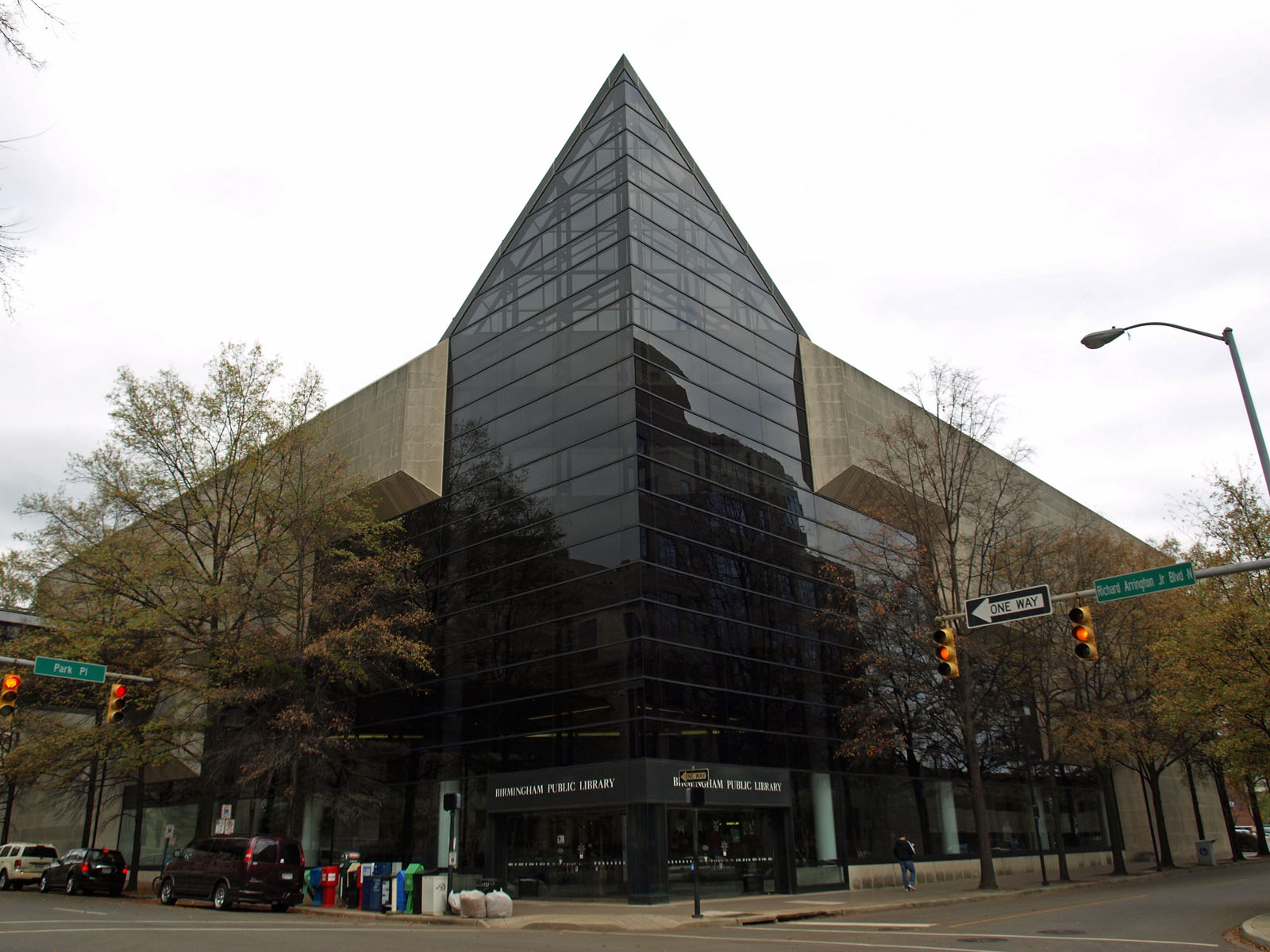
- 33.5210°N 86.8077°W
- Location: Birmingham, Alabama
- Established: 1886
- Branches: 18

Collection
- Size: 717,625

Access and use
- Circulation: 1,651,488

Other information
- Budget: FY 2022 $13.2 million
- Director: Janine Langston (interim)
- Employees: 300
- Website: http://www.bplonline.org

The Birmingham Public Library is one of the largest library systems in the southeastern United States. It consists of 19 branches, with a main or central library located in downtown Birmingham, Alabama. The main library is composed of two buildings, the East Building and the Linn-Henley Research Library containing the Tutwiler Collection of Southern History, and the Rucker Agee Map Collection.

== History ==
As an adjunct of Birmingham's public schools, the Birmingham Public Library was established in 1886. John H. Phillips, then superintendent of the public school system, set up a library in a room not much bigger than a closet. In 1913, a public library board was established, and the City of Birmingham assumed responsibility for funding the growing institution.

In 1918, a branch specifically for African-American residents to use was opened and named after Booker T. Washington. The Booker T. Washington branch was headed by Mattie Herd Roland, the first African-American librarian in Alabama.

The library was later moved to City Hall, where the collection burned in a fire in 1925. An impressive Neo-classical building of Indiana limestone was completed in 1927, serving as the central facility of the Birmingham Public Library for 57 years. The city's library system was desegregated in April 1963, in part because of a lawsuit filed by the Alabama Christian Movement for Human Rights on behalf of Joe and Lola Hendricks.

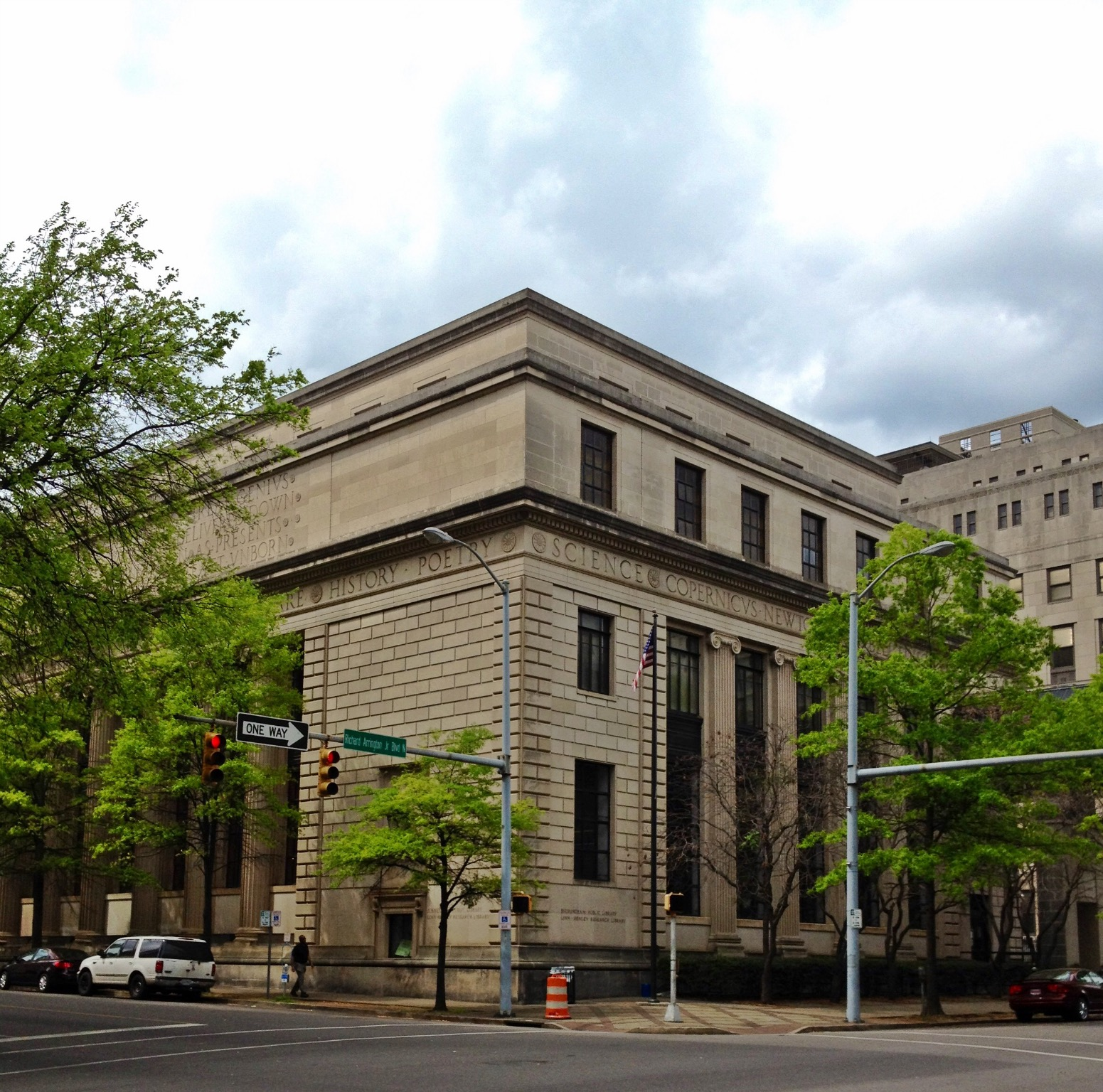
Exterior of the Linn-Henley Research Library

To accommodate the growing collection and demand for services, an additional structure containing 133,000 square feet (12,400 m^{2}) of floor space was completed in 1984 and connected to the original building via a crosswalk. This building houses most of the Central Library's circulating and general reference collections, plus the technical services for the library system.

The original 1927 building was renovated in 1985 and renamed the Linn-Henley Research Library. This facility houses the library's special collections, and government publications. Together, these two buildings comprise the Central Library of the Birmingham Public Library system.

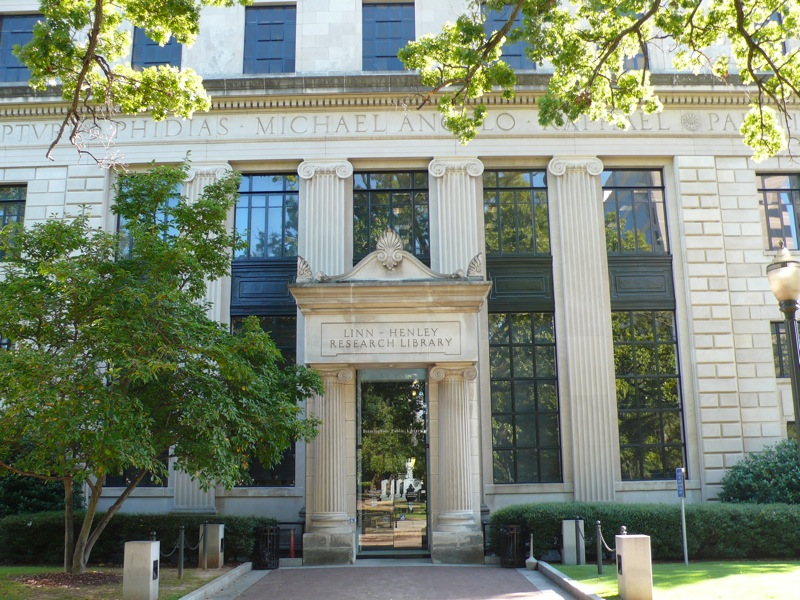
Entrance to the Linn-Henley Research Library

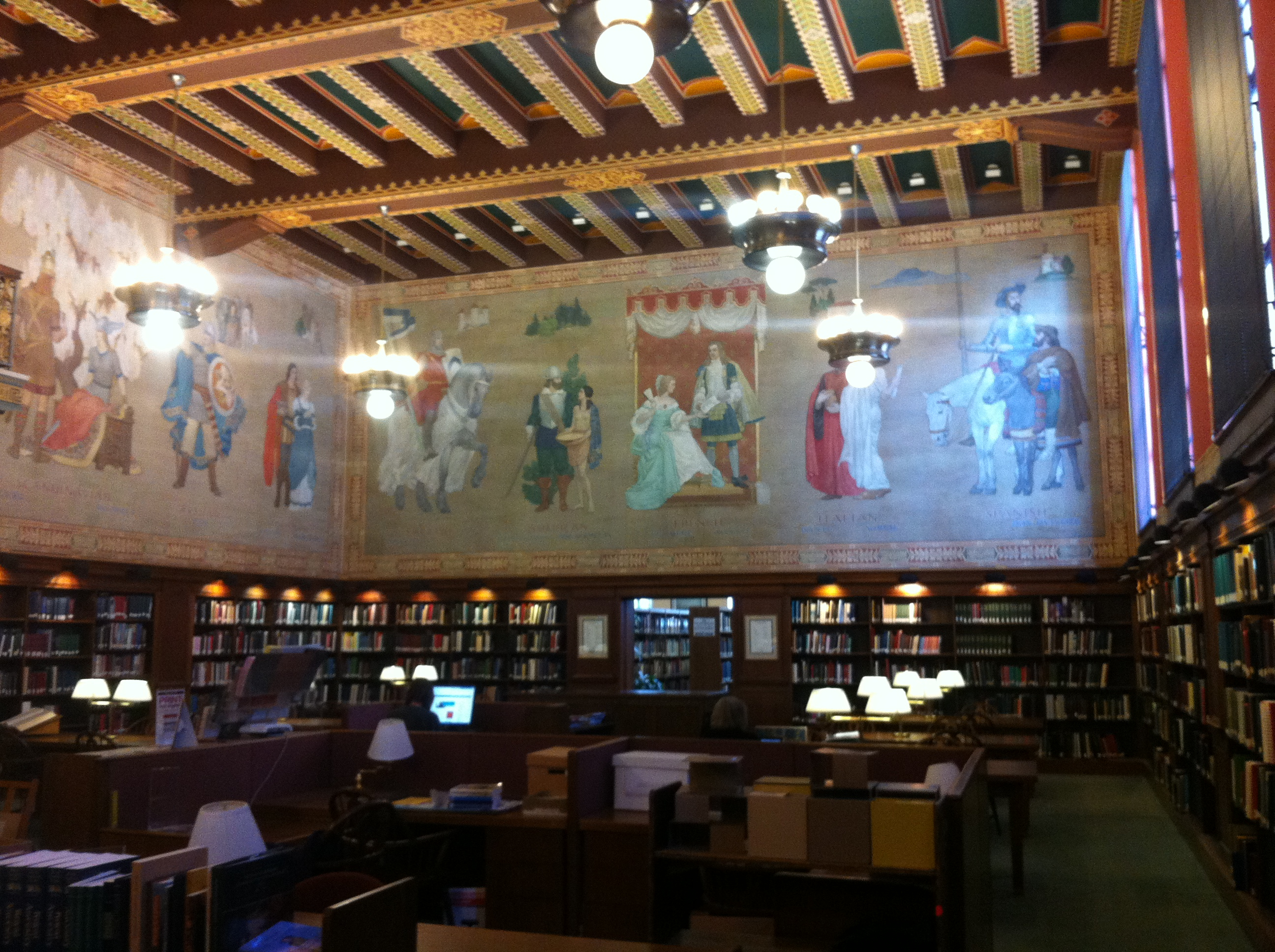
North side of the main research room showing part of one of the Ezra Winter Murals in the Linn-Henley Research Library

In addition to the Central Library, the Birmingham Public Library system includes 17 branches located elsewhere in the city. This branch system was begun when the Birmingham library began to integrate libraries from independent communities that gradually became incorporated into Birmingham. In the 1980s, the library board had adopted plans to build regional libraries that would serve large sections of the city, would have larger collections and facilities, and would be opened more hours.

Annual circulation of roughly 1.7 million checkouts is matched by an equal number of materials being used within the libraries and via electronic access. Birmingham Public Library accounts for 46% of the circulation in the Jefferson County Library Cooperative, which posts a combined circulation of almost 3.7 million items checked out annually. The cooperative agreement that Birmingham Public Library shares with the other municipal public libraries of Jefferson County, Alabama greatly increases the number of library materials available to all library members. In fact, the Jefferson County Library Cooperative is a model for how separate governments can work together to provide a public service across city boundaries.

Floyd Council was named the first male African-American director of the Birmingham Public Library system in 2017. Council's tenure was marked by internal conflict. Library employees suffered from "low morale," and allegations of a "toxic" work environment followed Council. Council was suspended without pay for a month in October 2020 for undisclosed reasons. He resigned shortly after in December 2020.

The COVID-19 pandemic caused major service disruptions. All branches temporarily closed in March 2020 before reopening with a focus on virtual programming and curbside services. A budget cut of nearly two million dollars due to the pandemic caused the system to furlough 158 of its 211 employees in September 2020. The Eastwood Branch Library was also permanently closed, the first branch to close since 2010. Many of the furloughed employees returned in December 2020 when curbside service was expanded to all neighborhood branches.

== Major collections and services ==
Tutwiler Collection of Southern History and Literature is a collection that covers Southern life and culture. There are extensive newspaper clipping files on local and regional history that can be searched for information along with periodicals and online databases. Other collections of note included are the Caribbean Collection, the Rucker Agee Map Collection, and the Rare Book Collection of early Americana.

In 2006, Digital Collections was initiated to preserve and make available the local history of Birmingham and the surrounding area.

Virtual Library Services include online databases, eBooks and downloadable audio books, Ask A Librarian, blogs and RSS feeds and other Internet resources.

Public Computing Services include public access computers at all locations and free wireless access to the Internet via Wi-Fi available at the Central Library, Avondale Branch, Five Points West Branch, North Birmingham Branch, Springville Road Branch and West End Branch.

== Library events ==
Alabama Bound is an annual book and author fair that celebrates Alabama authors and publishers. Hosted by the Birmingham Public Library, it is an event where fans may meet authors, buy their books and hear them read from and talk about their work. Book signings follow each presentation.

== Branches ==
The Birmingham Public Library operates 18 branches throughout many of Birmingham's neighborhoods. In addition to the Central Branch in Downtown, four larger branches are operate as regional branches.

Name	Address	Established	Community	Neighborhood	Notes
Avondale (Regional)	509 40th St. S	1908	Red Mountain	Forest Park-South Avondale	Became BPL Branch in 1913
Central	2100 Park Pl	1886	Northside	Central City	Main Branch, Includes Linn-Henley Research Library
East Ensley	900 14th St., Ensley	1965	Ensley	Ensley	
East Lake	5 Oporto-Madrid Blvd. S	1914	Roebuck-South East Lake	South East Lake	
Ensley	1201 25th St., Ensley	1906	Ensley	Ensley	Became BPL Branch in 1911 Current building opened in 1955 Closed indefinitely as of Sept 2023
Five Points West (Regional)	4812 Avenue W	mid-1930s	Five Points West	Central Park	
Inglenook	4100 40th Terrace N	1979	East Birmingham	Inglenook	
North Avondale	501 43rd St. N	1961	East Birmingham	North Avondale	
North Birmingham (Regional)	2501 31st Ave. N	1926	North Birmingham	North Birmingham	Current building opened in 1994
Powderly	3301 Jefferson Ave. SW	1979	Southwest	Jones Valley	
Pratt City	509 Dugan Ave.	1921	Pratt City	North Pratt	Current building opened in 2014 after 2011 tornado destroyed previous building
Smithfield	1 8th Ave. W	1918	Smithfield	Graymont	
Southside	1814 11th Ave. S	1945	Southside	Five Points South	Current building opened in 1996
Springville Road (Regional)	1224 Old Springville Rd.	1981	Huffman	Spring Lake	Replaced Huffman Branch Library est. 1963
Titusville	2 6th Ave. SW	1957	Titusville	North Titusville	Current building opened in 1992
West End	1348 Tuscaloosa Ave. SW		West End	Arlington-West End	
Woodlawn	5709 1st Ave. N	1905	Woodlawn	Woodlawn	Became BPL branch in 1911
Wylam	4300 7th Ave.	1921	Ensley	Wylam	Current building opened in 2021

=== Former branches ===
Name	Address	Established	Closed	Community	Neighborhood	Notes
Eastwood	4500 Montevallo Rd.	1982	2020	Crestline	Eastwood	Housed in Eastwood Mall until 2005
Slossfield	1916 25th Ct. N	1939	2010	North Birmingham	ACIPCO-Finley	
