= Lamar Weaver =

American civil rights activist (1928–2013)

Olin Lamar Weaver (11 January 1928- 6 December 2013) was a political and civil rights activist in the 1950s and 1960s in Birmingham, Alabama. The August 1957 cover of Ebony Magazine referred to Weaver as "The White Man Who Can't Go Home".

== Early life and education ==
Born in the rural farming community of Cassville, Georgia, to Willis Almos Weaver and Ruth Aileen Harris Weaver, Lamar Weaver grew up in the impoverished South during the Great Depression. He spent much of his childhood being looked after by various relatives in Cassville, Georgia and the small town of Holly Pond, Alabama. When he was four years old, Weaver witnessed the lynching of a young black male. He later recounted this episode his experience in his 2001 memoir Bury My Heart In Birmingham, published by Writers Club Press. Weaver attended South Eastern Bible College.

== Career ==
Weaver was a steelworker by trade and a lay minister. He later became an ordained minister. He and several members of his church became actively involved in the registration of black voters in Alabama, Mississippi, Georgia, and Florida.

Weaver ran for a seat on the Birmingham City Commission against Birmingham's former chief of police, Bull Conner, an avowed segregationist. He ran on an anti-segregationist platform. Weaver also wrote to Missouri senator Thomas C. Hennings, offering to appear before the Senate's Judiciary Constitutional Rights Subcommittee hearings about discrimination in the South.

On March 6, 1957, Weaver accompanied the Reverend Fred Shuttlesworth, a black minister and founder of the Alabama Christian Movement for Human Rights, and Mrs. Shuttlesworth, as they sat in the "White Interstate Waiting Room" of Birmingham's Terminal Railway Station, protected by police, as a peaceful protest of the segregationist laws. When Weaver exited the terminal station, he several members of a crowd which had gathered outside the station threw rocks and bricks at Weaver as he tried to leave in his car, shattering the side windows and cracking the windshield. Then the mob attempted to flip the car over with Weaver inside, all the while screaming threats and cursing him. The police did nothing to prevent the 'vigilante violence' occurring just outside the station.

Weaver escaped, but he was fined twenty-five dollars for "reckless" driving" and told by City Judge Ralph Parker to "get out of town". Weaver withdrew from the commissioner's race and was secretly escorted out of Birmingham by ACMHR members in a hearse. This incident made the front page of the Birmingham Post-Herald and was picked up by news-wire services, and caught the attention of Eleanor Roosevelt, who mentioned it in her My Day Column, on March 11, 1957.

The next day Weaver flew overnight to Washington, D.C. (flying under the name "James Bishop" for security reasons). On March 8, 1957, he became the first white man to testify before the U.S. Senate Judiciary Subcommittee for proposed Civil Rights. Weaver spoke out against the KKK, racial segregation, voter oppression, and violent mob rule in the South.

== Family ==
Weaver, who most recently lived in Kennesaw, Ga., died on Dec. 6, 2013. He had six children.

== Publications ==
- Weaver, Lamar (2001). Bury My Heart In Birmingham, the Lamar Weaver Story,. Writers Club Press. ISBN 0-595-18749-8.
