= Collegeville (Birmingham) =

Neighborhood in Birmingham, Alabama, United States

- Birmingham Neighborhood
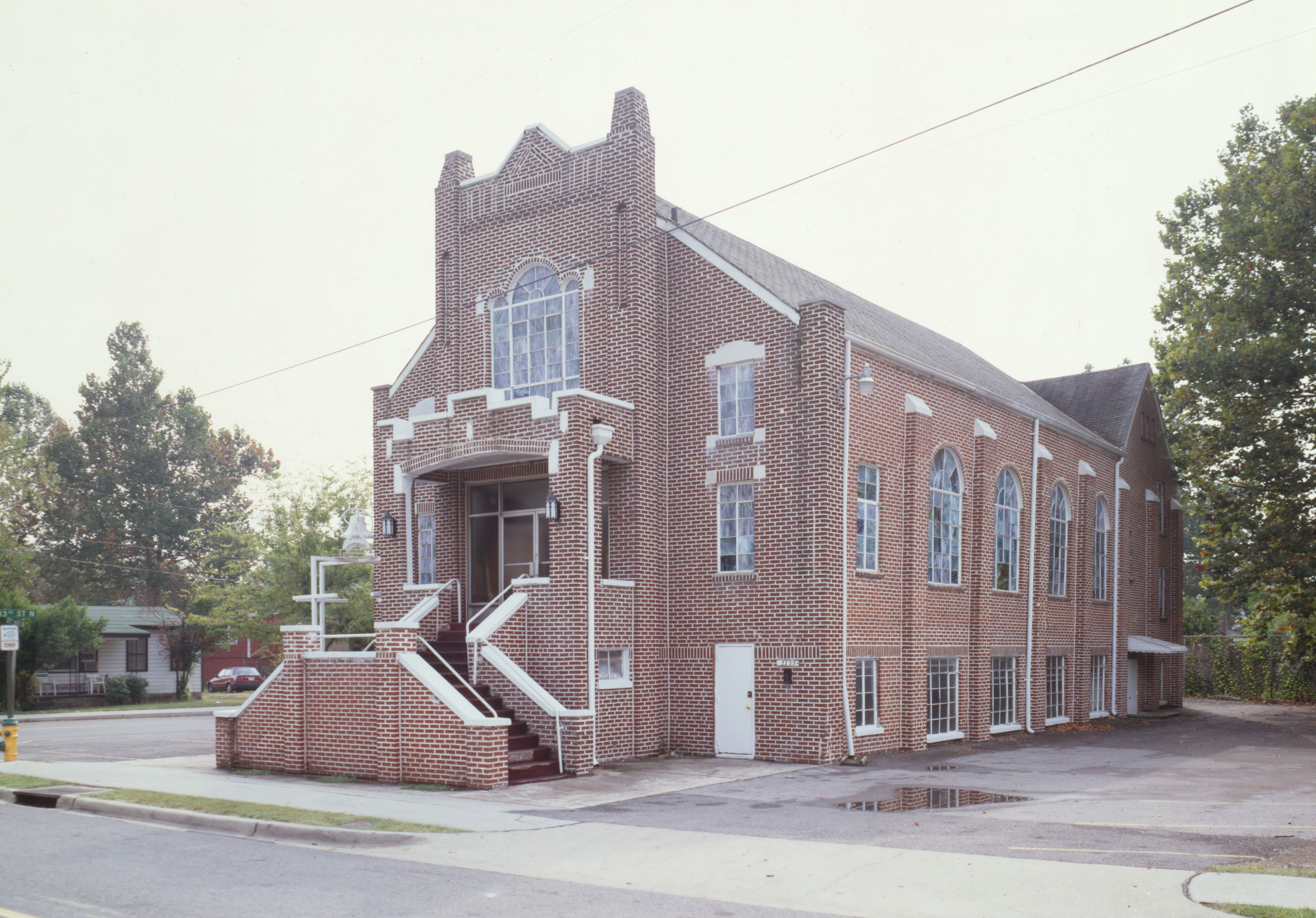
- Bethel Baptist Church
- Interactive map of Collegeville
- Coordinates: 33.5518°N 86.8020°W
- Country: United States
- State: Alabama
- City: Birmingham

Population (2026)
  - Total: 2,687
- Time zone: UTC-6 (CST)
  - Summer (DST): UTC-5 (CDT)
- ZIP Codes: 35207
- Area codes: 205, 659

Collegeville is a city neighborhood in the North Birmingham community of Birmingham, Alabama. It was named for the Lauderdale College Elementary School, also known as "The College", which burned down in 1916. Collegeville is home to the Bethel Baptist Church, a National Historic Landmark where civil rights activist Fred Shuttlesworth preached.

== History ==
Collegeville developed as an industrial area, with housing meant for workers at factories, mills, and railroads. Due to redlining, Collegeville was one of the areas where African-American residents were forced into. Because it was so cut off from the rest of the city by railroad tracks and barren roads, by the 1960s Collegeville was classified as a "high crime" district by Birmingham police. In the early 1970s, community activist Lula Menefee spurred the Jefferson County Department of Health to enforce sanitation laws in unoccupied properties, and the police to crack down on crime in the area.

Pollution from the nearby coke factories has also been a long-standing issue in Collegeville. From 1970 to the 1990s, Collegeville's population decreased from about 7,000 to under 4,200 residents as people moved away to escape the sulfurous air. In 2011, the EPA designated the area around the coke plant on 35th Avenue a Superfund site, but by 2020 the air still contained toxic chemicals that elevated cancer risk.
