= JCLC =

JCLC may refer to:

- Jefferson County Library Cooperative
- Journal of Criminal Law & Criminology
