= Audrey Faye Hendricks =

American child civil rights activist (1953–2009)

- Born: Audrey Faye Hendricks; 1953; Birmingham, Alabama
- Died: March 1, 2009 (aged 55–56); Birmingham, Alabama
- Occupation: Teacher
- Years active: 46 years and a 3d
- Organization: Southern Christian Leadership Conference
- Known for: The youngest known demonstrator to be incarcerated during the Civil Rights Movement
- Notable work: The Youngest Marcher: The Story of Audrey Faye Hendricks, A Young Civil Rights Activist 2017 by Cynthia Levinson

Audrey Faye Hendricks (1953–2009) was the youngest known demonstrator to be incarcerated during the Civil Rights Movement in 1963. At just nine years old, Audrey was involved in the Brown v. Board Education march with Civil Rights Leaders to establish that racial segregation in public schools is unconstitutional, being one of many children who were arrested and jailed. Audrey was also one of thousands of children involved in the Children's Crusade on May 2, 1963.

== Early life ==
Audrey Faye Hendricks was born in Birmingham, Alabama in 1953 to Lola Mae Haynes and Joseph Hendricks, she also has a sister, Jan Hendricks Fuller. Audrey attended school at Center Street Elementary in Birmingham, Alabama. Audrey's mother, Lola Mae Hendricks was a clerk-typist and a secretary working from Shuttlesworth's office at Bethel Baptist Church.

== Civil Rights Movement ==
The Supreme Court ruled in Brown v. Board of Education that the segregated schools were unconstitutional in 1954. In 1961, Audrey's parents were among the Civil Rights Activists who won a lawsuit to integrate Birmingham's 67 parks, following to Police Commissioner Eugene "Bull" Connor's retaliated by closing the parks.

In 1963, Audrey and other students from her school decided to walk out of class and join the march to Birmingham's Sixteenth Street Baptist Church with the Civil Rights Leaders like Martin Luther King Jr. The students were organized into protest groups and marched the last four days in addition to demonstrating the discrimination in Birmingham. By May 6, Audrey was one of the approximately 2,000 children who were arrested and jailed in the Juvenile Hall, causing what is known as the Children's Crusade. This led to Hendricks being known as one of the youngest demonstrators to be incarcerated during the Civil Rights Movement.

In 1969, about 15 years after the Brown v. Board of Education, Hendricks attended her first desegregated school.

== Later life ==
Later on after her involvement in the Civil Rights Movement, Hendricks went to Bishop College and became a school teacher in Dallas, Texas. 8 years later, she was drawn back to Birmingham, Alabama, where she was helping children who were in low-income families, for 25 years. In 2007 she earned her master's degree.

Hendricks died in Birmingham, Alabama March 1, 2009 at 55 years old.

January 17, 2017, Cynthia Levinson published The Youngest Marcher: The Story of Audrey Faye Hendricks, a Young Civil Rights Activist, a book about Audrey Faye Hendrick's life being a child involved with the Civil Rights Movement, as well as her journey and experiences through being an activist at such a young age.

== See also ==
- Lola Hendricks
