= Mattie Herd Roland =

African-American librarian

Mattie Herd Roland was Alabama's first African-American librarian. Herd was selected and trained to head the first library for African-American use in Alabama, the Booker T. Washington branch of the Birmingham Public Library, which opened in 1918.

== Early life and education ==
Mattie Herd was the daughter of a railroad switchman in Birmingham, Alabama.

A group of African-American Birmingham principals met with Booker T. Washington and the director of the Birmingham Public Library in 1913 to select a high school student who would be trained in library services with the aim of leading the library's first black branch; they chose Mattie Herd. She worked after school at the central library to gain library experience. She finished high school and in 1917 went on to study for a year at the library education program started by Thomas Fountain Blue at Louisville Public Library.

== Library career ==
Herd was interviewed in July 1918 to confirm her readiness to serve as a librarian. She was hired at a salary of $35 a month, one-third that of white librarians in similar roles. The branch opened in October 1918, though a planned opening ceremony was canceled due to the 1918 influenza pandemic. The Birmingham Library Board did not permit books to circulate between the white and black branches of the library; instead, books from the central library would be given to the black branch, and a replacement book for the central library would be purchased from funds for the black branch. The board gave Herd the title of "library assistant" despite the fact that she was the head of the branch responsible for providing library services to the 80,000 African-American residents of Birmingham.

Herd headed the library branch for four months before the board decided that a man would be a better choice to encourage use of the library; the man they eventually found to replace Herd was also poorly supported by the board's actions, and lasted only six months in the position. Despite the fact that she was in the position for only a short time, Herd has been described as "a pioneer in black librarianship". Librarian Annie Greene King described the opening of the Booker T. Washington branch as an important moment in the black public library movement.
