= Sardis Baptist Church (Birmingham, Alabama) =

Historic church in Alabama, United States

- U.S. National Register of Historic Places
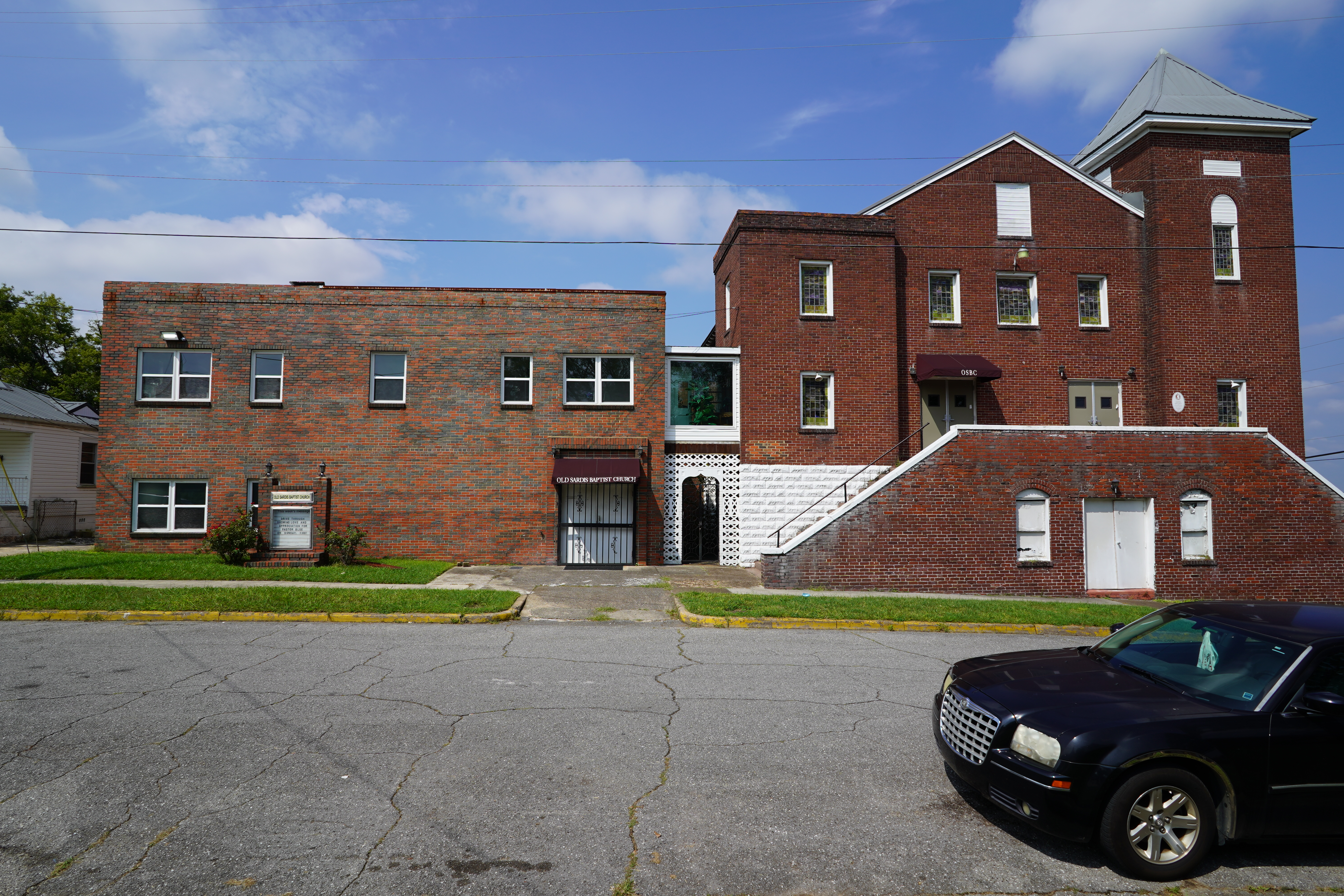

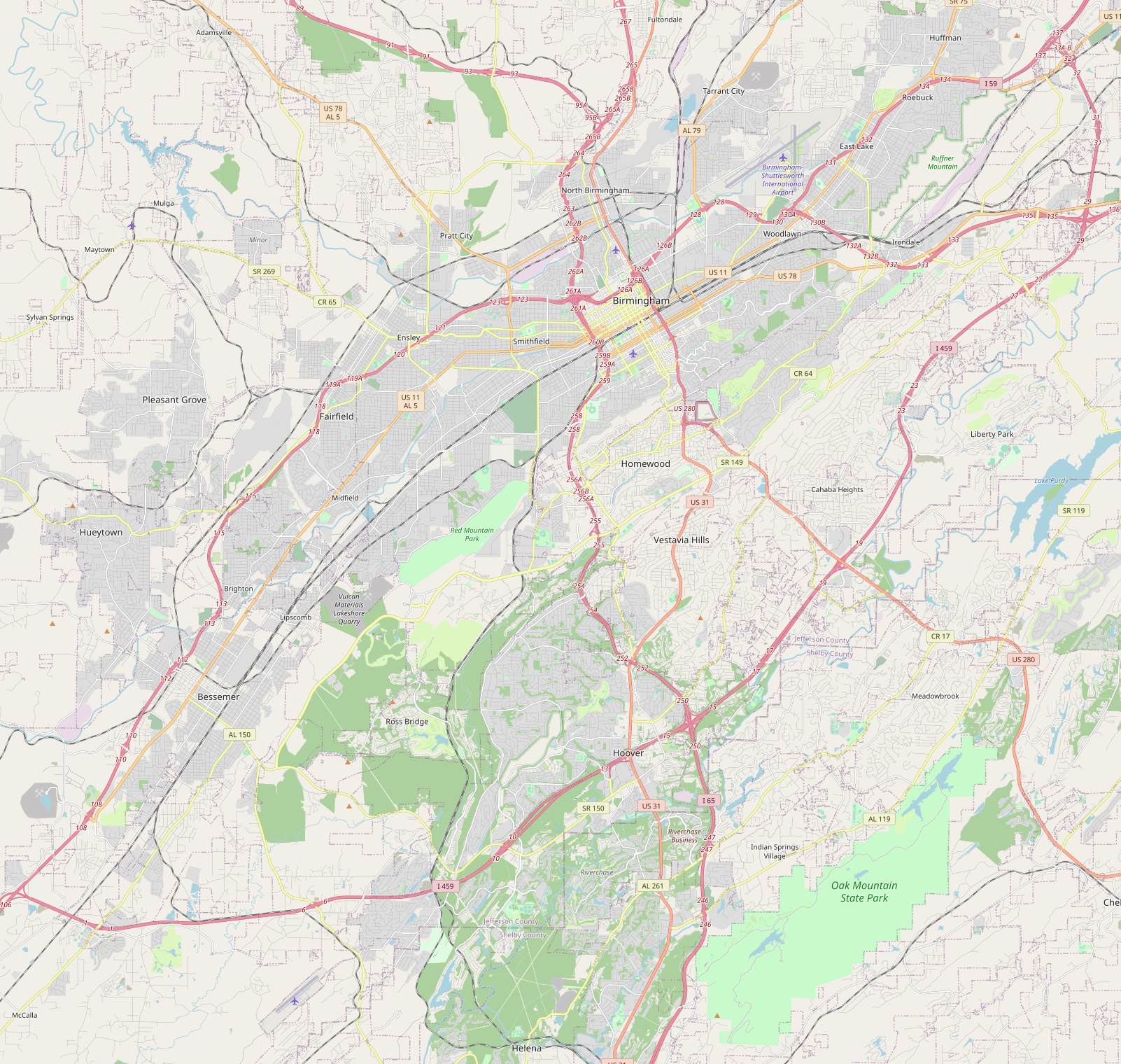
- Location within Birmingham, Alabama Location within Alabama Location within the United States
- Location: 1240 Fourth St. N Birmingham, Alabama
- Coordinates: 33°31′28″N 86°49′50″W
- Built: c. 1910
- Architectural style: Gothic Revival
- MPS: Civil Rights Movement in Birmingham, Alabama MPS
- NRHP reference No.: 05000298
- Added to NRHP: April 20, 2005

Sardis Baptist Church in Birmingham, Alabama, also known as Old Sardis Baptist Church, was built around 1910. The church as the location where the Alabama Christian Movement for Human Rights was created at a mass meeting of over 1,000 people on June 5, 1956. Its pastor, the Reverend Robert L. Alford, was one of the founders of the organization. The church building was listed on the National Register of Historic Places in 2005.

The congregation relocated to a Graymont Avenue in 1975, but a remnant of the members founded Old Sardis Baptist Church the next year to continue ministry at the historic site.
