= North Birmingham =

- Birmingham Neighborhood
- Interactive map of North Birmingham
- Coordinates: 33°33′13.38″N 86°49′7.93″W
- Country: United States
- State: Alabama
- City: Birmingham
- Elevation: 581 ft (177 m)
- Time zone: UTC-6 (CST)
  - Summer (DST): UTC-5 (CDT)
- ZIP Codes: 35207
- Area codes: 205, 659

North Birmingham is a community of Birmingham in Jefferson County, Alabama, United States. Currently, the North Birmingham community is further subdivided into six neighborhoods: Acipco-Finley, Collegeville, Fairmont, Harriman Park, Hooper City, and North Birmingham. The community consists of the area north of Downtown Birmingham between Village Creek on the south, the Louisville and Nashville Railroad to the east, Pratt to the west and the jurisdictional boundary to the north. Originally incorporated as the city of North Birmingham in 1902, it was annexed into the City of Birmingham in 1910.
