= Jefferson County Library Cooperative =

The Jefferson County Library Cooperative (JCLC) is a 501(c)(3) tax-exempt educational consortium of public libraries in Jefferson County, Alabama. The JCLC administrative office is located at the Birmingham Public Central Library. The member libraries within the cooperative are autonomous, with each one maintaining its own board, director and budget.

== History ==
Jefferson County has had a countywide public library service since 1924, however, no-fee service for Jefferson County citizens began in 1978. In 1985, it was reorganized as Birmingham Area Library Services under the framework issued by the Alabama Public Library Service. In 1997, it was renamed the Jefferson County Library Cooperative and continues to operate as a not-for-profit educational organization.

== Member libraries ==
- Adamsville Library
- Avondale Regional Branch Library
- Bessemer Library
- Birmingham Botanical Gardens Library
- Central Library
- East Ensley Branch Library
- East Lake Branch Library
- Eastwood Branch Library
- Emmet O'Neal Library
- Ensley Branch Library
- Five Points West Regional Library
- Fultondale Library
- Gardendale-Martha Moore Library
- Graysville Public Library
- Homewood Library
- Hoover Public Library
- Hueytown Public Library
- Inglenook Branch Library
- Irondale Public Library
- Leeds-Jane Culbreth Public Library
- Midfield Public Library
- North Avondale Branch Library
- North Birmingham Regional Branch Library
- Pleasant Grove Public Library
- Powderly Branch Library
- Pratt City Branch Library
- Slossfield Branch Library
- Smithfield Branch Library
- Southside Branch Library
- Springville Road Regional Branch Library
- Tarrant Public Library
- Titusville Branch Library
- Trussville Public Library
- Vestavia Hills Public Library
- Walter J. Hanna Library
- Warrior-Evelyn Thornton Public Library
- West End Branch Library
- Woodlawn Branch Library
- Wylam Branch Library
