= Fred Shuttlesworth =

American civil rights activist (1922–2011)

The Reverend Fred Shuttlesworth
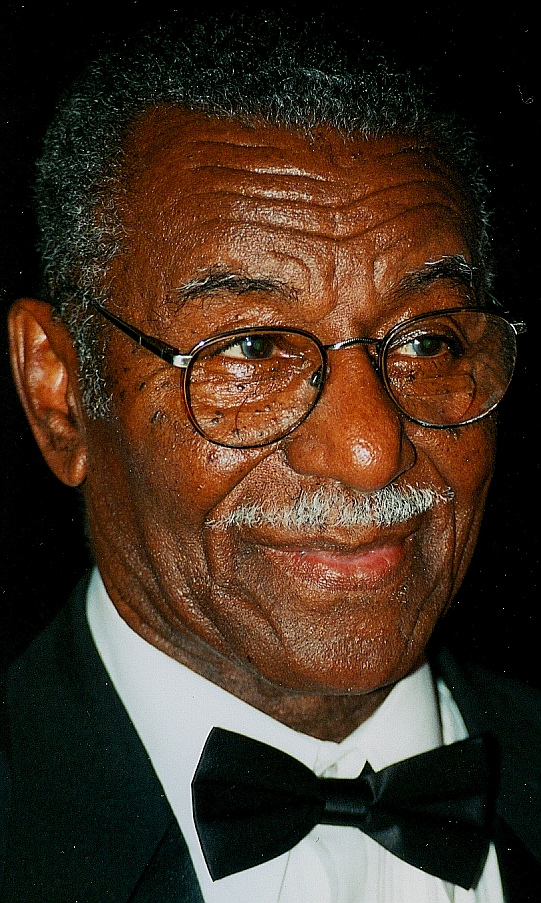
- Shuttlesworth in 2002

5th President of the Southern Christian Leadership Conference
- In office August – November 2004
- Preceded by: Martin Luther King III
- Succeeded by: Charles Steele Jr.

Personal details
- Born: Freddie Lee Robinson; March 18, 1922 Mount Meigs, Alabama, U.S.
- Died: October 5, 2011 (aged 89) Birmingham, Alabama, U.S.
- Resting place: Oak Hill Cemetery; Birmingham, Alabama
- Known for: Civil Rights Movement
- Affiliations: Alabama Christian Movement for Human Rights (ACMHR)
- Television: Eyes on the Prize (1987); Freedom Riders (2010)

Freddie Lee Shuttlesworth (born Freddie Lee Robinson, March 18, 1922 – October 5, 2011) was an American Baptist minister and civil rights activist who led fights against segregation and other forms of racism, during the civil rights movement. He often worked with Martin Luther King Jr., although they did not always agree on tactics and approaches.

In 1957, along with Martin Luther King Jr., Shuttlesworth was a co-founder of the Southern Christian Leadership Conference. In 1961, he took up a pastorate in Cincinnati, Ohio to work against racism, and on behalf of homeless people, but remained active in Birmingham. In 1963, he initiated and was instrumental in the Birmingham Campaign. He returned from Cincinnati to Birmingham after his retirement in 2007.

The Birmingham–Shuttlesworth International Airport was named in his honor in 2008, and the Birmingham Civil Rights Institute Fred L. Shuttlesworth Human Rights Award is bestowed annually in his name.

== Early life ==
Born to an African American family in Mount Meigs, Alabama on March 18, 1922, Shuttlesworth attended Rosedale High School from which he graduated as the valedictorian. He studied at Selma University, earning his B.A. in 1951, and later earned his B.S. from Alabama State University.

== Ministry and civil rights activism ==
Shuttlesworth got his license as a country preacher when he was changing from a Methodist to a Baptist Christian. He became pastor of the Bethel Baptist Church in Birmingham in 1953 and was Membership Chairman of the Alabama state chapter of the National Association for the Advancement of Colored People (NAACP) in 1956, when the State of Alabama formally outlawed it from operating within the state.

=== Alabama Christian Movement for Civil Rights ===
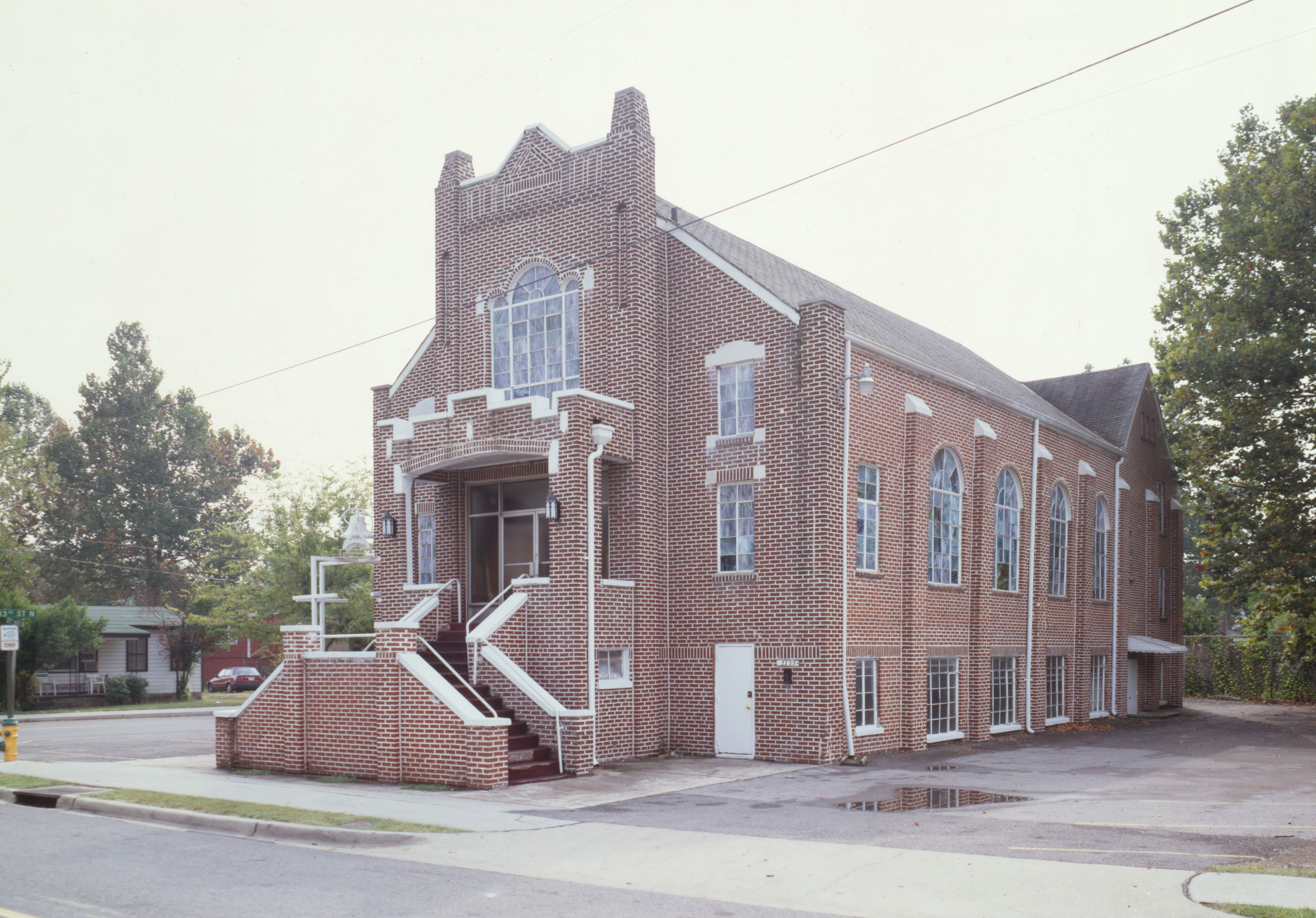
Shuttlesworth pastored Bethel Baptist Church from 1953 to 1961. The church was the headquarters of the Alabama Christian Movement for Human Rights (ACMHR), which Shuttlesworth founded in 1956. It was bombed three times, the first time being on December 25, 1956.

In May 1956, Shuttlesworth and Ed Gardner established the Alabama Christian Movement for Human Rights to take up the work formerly done by the NAACP. The ACMHR raised almost all of its funds from local sources at mass meetings. It used both litigation and direct action to pursue its goals. When the authorities ignored the ACMHR's demand that the City hire black police officers, the organization sued. Similarly, when the United States Supreme Court ruled in December 1956 that bus segregation in Montgomery, Alabama, was unconstitutional, Shuttlesworth announced that the ACMHR would challenge segregation laws in Birmingham on December 26, 1956.

=== Murder attempts ===
On December 25, 1956, an attempt was made on Shuttlesworth's life by placing sixteen sticks of dynamite under his bedroom window. He escaped unhurt although his house was heavily damaged. A police officer, who also belonged to the Ku Klux Klan, told Shuttlesworth as he came out of his home, "If I were you I'd get out of town as quick as I could". Shuttlesworth told him to tell the Klan that he was not leaving and "I wasn't raised to run."

When Shuttlesworth and his wife Ruby attempted to enroll their children in John Herbert Phillips High School, a previously all-white public school in Birmingham in the summer of 1957, a mob of Klansmen attacked them, with the police nowhere to be seen. The mob beat Shuttlesworth with "chains, baseball bats and brass knuckles, and his wife was stabbed in the hips". His assailants included Bobby Frank Cherry, who six years later was involved in the 16th Street Baptist Church Bombing. Shuttlesworth drove himself and his wife to the hospital, where he told his children to "always forgive".

In 1958, Shuttlesworth survived another attempt on his life. A church member standing guard saw a bomb that had been placed beside the church and quickly moved it to the street before it went off.

=== Southern Christian Leadership Conference ===
External videos
- "Interview with Fred Shuttlesworth" conducted in 1985 for the Eyes on the Prize documentary in which he discusses his involvement in Southern Christian Leadership Conference (SCLC), along with civil rights campaigns in the South, particularly focusing on Birmingham.

In 1957, Shuttlesworth, along with Martin Luther King Jr., Ralph Abernathy from Montgomery, Joseph Lowery from Mobile, Alabama, T. J. Jemison from Baton Rouge, Louisiana, Charles Kenzie Steele from Tallahassee, Florida, A. L. Davis from New Orleans, Louisiana, Bayard Rustin and Ella Baker founded the Southern Christian Leadership Conference. The SCLC adopted a motto to underscore its commitment to nonviolence: "Not one hair of one head of one person should be harmed."

Shuttlesworth embraced that philosophy, even though his own personality was combative, headstrong and sometimes blunt-spoken to the point that he frequently antagonized his colleagues in the Civil Rights Movement as well as his opponents. He was not shy in asking King to take a more active role in leading the fight against segregation and warning that history would not look kindly on those who gave "flowery speeches" but did not act on them. He alienated some members of his congregation by devoting as much time as he did to the movement at the expense of weddings, funerals, and other ordinary church functions.

As a result, in 1961, Shuttlesworth moved to Cincinnati, Ohio, to take up the pastorage of the Revelation Baptist Church. He remained intensely involved in the Birmingham campaign after moving to Cincinnati, and frequently returned to help lead actions.

Shuttlesworth was apparently personally fearless, even though he was aware of the risks he ran. Other committed activists were scared off or mystified by his willingness to accept the risk of death. Shuttlesworth himself vowed to "kill segregation or be killed by it".

Decades later, when Shuttlesworth was named president of the Southern Christian Leadership Conference in August 2004, he resigned later in the year, complaining that "deceit, mistrust and a lack of spiritual discipline and truth have eaten at the core of this once-hallowed organization".

Birmingham Terminal Station was built with segregated waiting areas to comply with Jim Crow laws. Challenges to this segregation began in the 1950s, leading to a 1957 lawsuit and a court order to desegregate the station in 1961. That same year, Fred Shuttlesworth and his wife protested by entering the white waiting room before boarding a train. Though police escorted them safely, white integrationist Lamar Weaver was attacked by protesters after speaking with Shuttlesworth.

=== Freedom Rides ===
Shuttlesworth participated in the sit-ins against segregated lunch counters in 1960 and took part in the organization and completion of the Freedom Rides in 1961. Shuttlesworth originally warned that Alabama was extremely volatile when he was consulted before the Freedom Rides began. Shuttlesworth noted that he respected the courage of the activists proposing the Rides but that he felt other actions could be taken to accelerate the Civil Rights Movement that would be less dangerous. However, the planners of the Rides were undeterred and decided to continue preparing.

After it became certain that the Freedom Rides were to be carried out, Shuttlesworth worked with the Congress of Racial Equality (C.O.R.E.) to organize the Rides and became engaged with ensuring the success of the rides, especially during their stint in Alabama. Shuttlesworth mobilized some of his fellow clergy to assist the rides. After the Riders were badly beaten and nearly killed in Birmingham and Anniston during the Rides, he sent deacons to pick up the Riders from a hospital in Anniston.

He himself had been brutalized earlier in the day and had faced down the threat of being thrown out of the hospital by the hospital superintendent. Shuttlesworth took in the Freedom Riders at the Bethel Baptist Church, allowing them to recuperate after the violence that had occurred earlier in the day.

The violence in Anniston and Birmingham almost led to a quick end to the Freedom Rides. However, the actions of supporters like Shuttlesworth gave James Farmer, the leader of C.O.R.E., which had originally organized the Freedom Rides, and other activists the courage to press forward. After the violence that occurred in Alabama but before the Freedom Riders could move on, Attorney General Robert F. Kennedy gave Shuttlesworth his personal phone number in case the Freedom Riders needed federal support.

When Shuttlesworth prepared the Riders to leave Birmingham and they reached the Greyhound Terminal, the Riders found themselves stranded as no bus driver was willing to drive the controversial group into Mississippi. Shuttlesworth stuck with the Riders and called Kennedy. Prompted by Shuttlesworth, Kennedy tried to find a replacement bus driver, although his efforts eventually proved unsuccessful. The Riders then decided to take a plane to New Orleans (where they had planned on finishing the Rides) and were assisted by Shuttlesworth in getting to the airport and onto the plane.

Shuttlesworth's commitment to the Freedom Rides was highlighted by Diane Nash, a student activist in the Nashville Student Movement and a major organizer of the later waves of Rides. Nash noted,

Fred was practically a legend. I think it was important – for me, definitely, and for a city of people who were carrying on a movement – for there to be somebody that really represented strength, and that's certainly what Fred did. He would not back down, and you could count on it. He would not sell out, [and] you could count on that.

The students involved in the Rides appreciated Shuttlesworth's commitment to the principles of the Freedom Rides – ending the segregationist laws of the Jim Crow South. Shuttlesworth's fervent passion for equality made him a role model to many of the Riders.

=== Project C ===
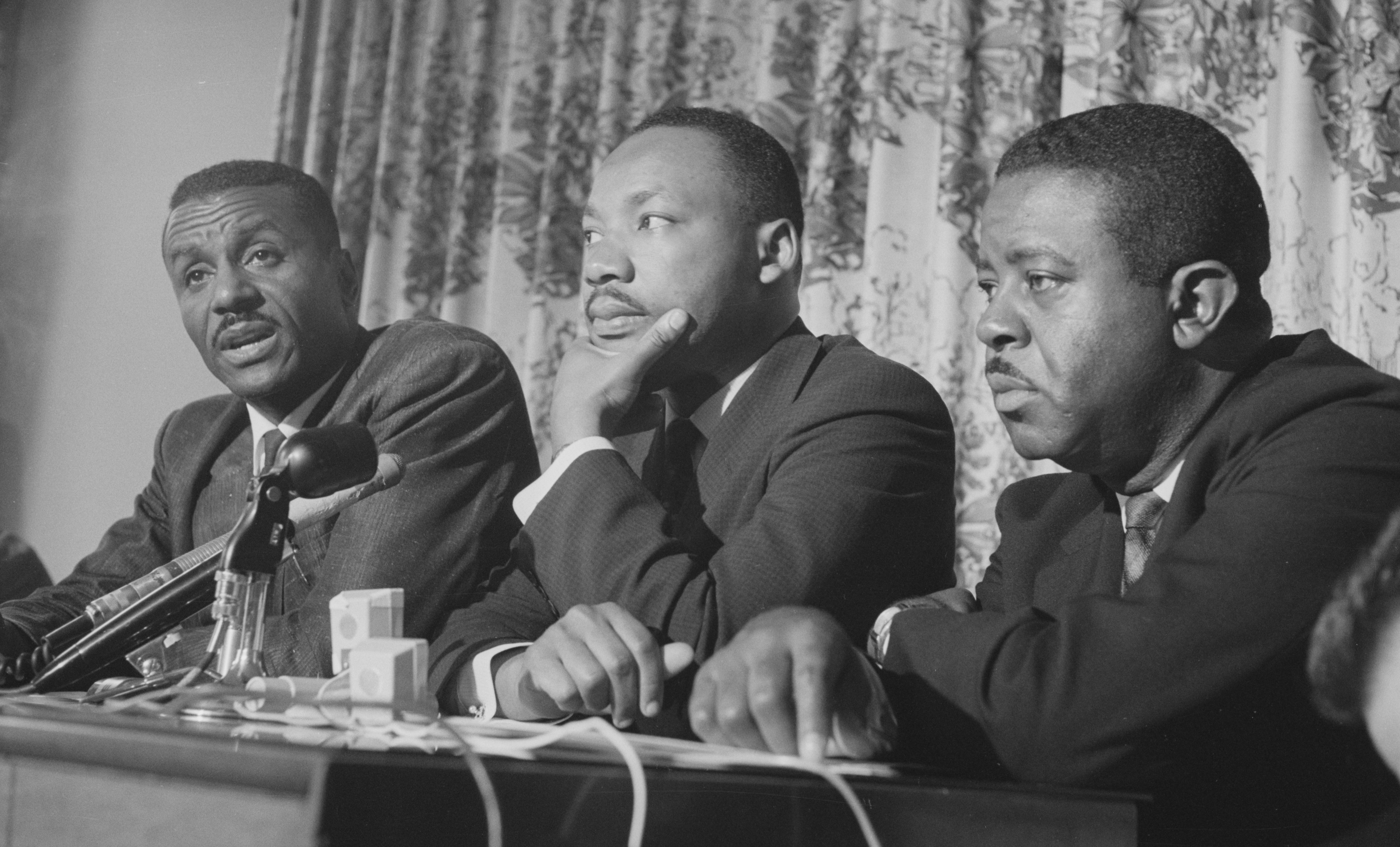
From left to right: Shuttlesworth, King, and Albernathy at a press conference in May 1963

Shuttlesworth invited SCLC and King to come to Birmingham in 1963 to lead the campaign to desegregate it through mass demonstrations–what Shuttlesworth called "Project C", the "C" standing for "confrontation". While Shuttlesworth was willing to negotiate with political and business leaders for peaceful abandonment of segregation, he believed, with good reason, that they would not take any steps that they were not forced to take. He suspected their promises could not be trusted until they acted on them.

One of the 1963 demonstrations he led resulted in Shuttlesworth's being convicted of parading without a permit from the City Commission. On appeals the case reached the US Supreme Court. In its 1969 decision of Shuttlesworth v. Birmingham, the Supreme Court reversed Shuttlesworth's conviction, determining that circumstances indicated that the parade permit was denied not to control traffic, as the state contended, but to censor ideas.

In 1963, Shuttlesworth was set on provoking a crisis that would force the authorities and business leaders to recalculate the cost of segregation. This occurred when James Bevel initiated and organized the young students of the city to stand up for their rights. This plan was helped immeasurably by Eugene "Bull" Connor, the Commissioner of Public Safety and the most powerful public official in Birmingham, who used Klan groups to heighten violence against blacks in the city. Even as the business class was beginning to see the end of segregation, Connor was determined to maintain it. While Connor's direct police tactics intimidated black citizens of Birmingham, they also created a split between Connor and the business leaders. They resented both the damage Connor was doing to Birmingham's image around the world and his high-handed attitude toward them.

Similarly, while Connor may have benefited politically in the short run from Shuttlesworth's and Bevel's determined provocations, they also fit into Shuttleworth's long-term plans. The televised images of Connor's directing handlers of police dogs to attack young unarmed demonstrators and firefighters using hoses to knock down children had a profound effect on American citizens' view of the civil rights struggle, and helped lead to the Civil Rights Act of 1964.

Shuttlesworth's activities were not limited to Birmingham. In 1964, he traveled to St. Augustine, Florida (which he often cited as the place where the civil rights struggle met with the most violent resistance), taking part in marches and widely publicized beach wade-ins.

In 1965, he was active in the Selma Voting Rights Movement, and its march from Selma to Montgomery which led to the passage of the Voting Rights Act of 1965. Shuttlesworth thus played a role in the efforts that led to the passage of the two great legislative accomplishments of the Civil Rights Movement. In later years he took part in commemorative activities in Selma at the time of the anniversary of the famous march. And he returned to St. Augustine in 2004 to take part in a celebration of the fortieth anniversary of the St. Augustine movement there.

=== 1966–2006 ===
Shuttlesworth organized the Greater New Light Baptist Church in 1966. In 1978, Shuttlesworth was portrayed by Roger Robinson in the television miniseries King.

Shuttlesworth founded the "Shuttlesworth Housing Foundation" in 1988 to assist families who might otherwise be unable to buy their own homes. In 1998, Shuttlesworth became an early signer and supporter of the Birmingham Pledge, a grassroots community committed to combating racism and prejudice. It has since then been used for programs in all fifty states and in more than twenty countries.

During the 2004 election that overturned a city charter provision that prohibited Cincinnati's City Council from adopting any gay rights ordinance, Shuttlesworth voiced advertisements urging voters to reject the repeal, saying "The thing that I disagree with is when gay people ... equate civil rights, what we did in the '50s and '60s, with special rights ... I think what they propose is special rights. Sexual rights is not the same as civil rights and human rights."

== Family ==
Statue of Shuttlesworth in front of the Birmingham Civil Rights Institute by sculptor John Walter Rhoden.

Although he was born Freddie Lee Robinson, Shuttlesworth took the name of his stepfather, William N. Shuttlesworth, a coal miner and a bootlegger.

Shuttlesworth was married to Ruby Keeler Shuttlesworth, with whom he had four children: Patricia Shuttlesworth Massengill, Ruby Shuttlesworth Bester, Fred L. Shuttlesworth Jr., and Carolyn Shuttlesworth. The Shuttleworths divorced in 1970, and Ruby died the following year.

Fred's mother, Alberta died in 1995 at the age of 95.

== Later life, death and legacy ==
Prompted by the removal of a non-cancerous brain tumor in August of the previous year, he gave his final sermon in front of 300 people at the Greater New Light Baptist Church on March 19, 2006—the weekend of his 84th birthday. He and his second wife, Sephira, moved to downtown Birmingham where he was receiving medical treatment.

=== Death ===
On October 5, 2011, Shuttlesworth died at the age of 89 in Birmingham, Alabama. The Birmingham Civil Rights Institute announced that it intended to include Shuttlesworth's burial site on the Civil Rights History Trail. By order of Alabama governor Robert Bentley, flags on state government buildings were to be lowered to half-staff until Shuttlesworth's interment. He is buried in the Oak Hill Cemetery in Birmingham.

=== Legacy ===
In 1998, South Crescent Avenue in Cincinnati was renamed in his honor. On January 8, 2001, he was presented with the Presidential Citizens Medal by President Bill Clinton.

In 2004, Shuttlesworth received the Award for Greatest Public Service Benefiting the Disadvantaged, an award is given out annually by Jefferson Awards. On July 16, 2008, the Birmingham, Alabama, Airport Authority approved changing the name of the Birmingham's airport in honor of Shuttlesworth. On October 27, 2008, the airport was officially changed to Birmingham–Shuttlesworth International Airport. On May 24, 2024, a mural portraying his likeness was unveiled in the airport, painted by Rico Gatson. The dedication was attended by his wife and two daughters.

A mural displaying his likeness was painted on the side of the Legal Services Building in Birmingham in 2003.

== See also ==
- List of civil rights leaders
- Timeline of the civil rights movement

== Bibliography ==
- Andrew Manis. (1999) A Fire You Can't Put Out: The Civil Rights Life of Birmingham's Reverend Fred Shuttlesworth. Tuscaloosa: University of Alabama Press. ISBN 0-8173-0968-3
- Branch, Taylor (1988) Parting The Waters; America In The King Years 1954–63. New York: Simon and Schuster. ISBN 0-671-46097-8
- Manis, Andrew M. (Summer–Fall 2000). "Birmingham's Reverend Fred Shuttlesworth: unsung hero of the civil rights movement". Baptist History and Heritage. 35 (3). Archived from the original on September 23, 2004 – via FindArticles.
- *McWhorter, Diane (2001). Carry Me Home: Birmingham, Alabama, the Climactic Battle of the Civil Rights Revolution. Simon and Schuster. ISBN 0-7432-1772-1
- Nunnelley, William (1991). Bull Connor. University of Alabama Press. ISBN 0-585-32316-X
- White, Marjorie Longenecker (1998) A Walk to Freedom: The Reverend Fred Shuttlesworth and the Alabama Christian Movement for Human Rights. Birmingham: Birmingham Historical Society. ISBN 0-943994-24-1
- White, Marjorie, Manis, Andrew, eds. (2000) Birmingham Revolutionaries: The Reverend Fred Shuttlesworth and the Alabama Christian Movement for Human Rights. Mercer University Press. ISBN 0-86554-709-2
- Curnutte, Mark (January 20, 1997) "In the Name of Civil Rights: The Rev. Fred Shuttlesworth carries on a 40-year fight as the movement's 'battlefield general'." Cincinnati Enquirer – accessed January 20, 2007.
- "The Champion" (November 26, 1965) Time.
- Walton, Val (February 19, 2008) "Rev. Shuttlesworth to return to Birmingham for post-stroke therapy". Birmingham News
- Garrison, Greg (June 29, 2008) "Legacy, history of civil rights icon Fred Shuttlesworth". Birmingham News
- The White House – Office of the Press Secretary
