= Bethel Baptist Church (Birmingham, Alabama) =

Historic church in Alabama, United States

- Bethel Baptist Church, Parsonage, and Guardhouse
- U.S. National Register of Historic Places
- U.S. National Historic Landmark
- Alabama Register of Landmarks and Heritage
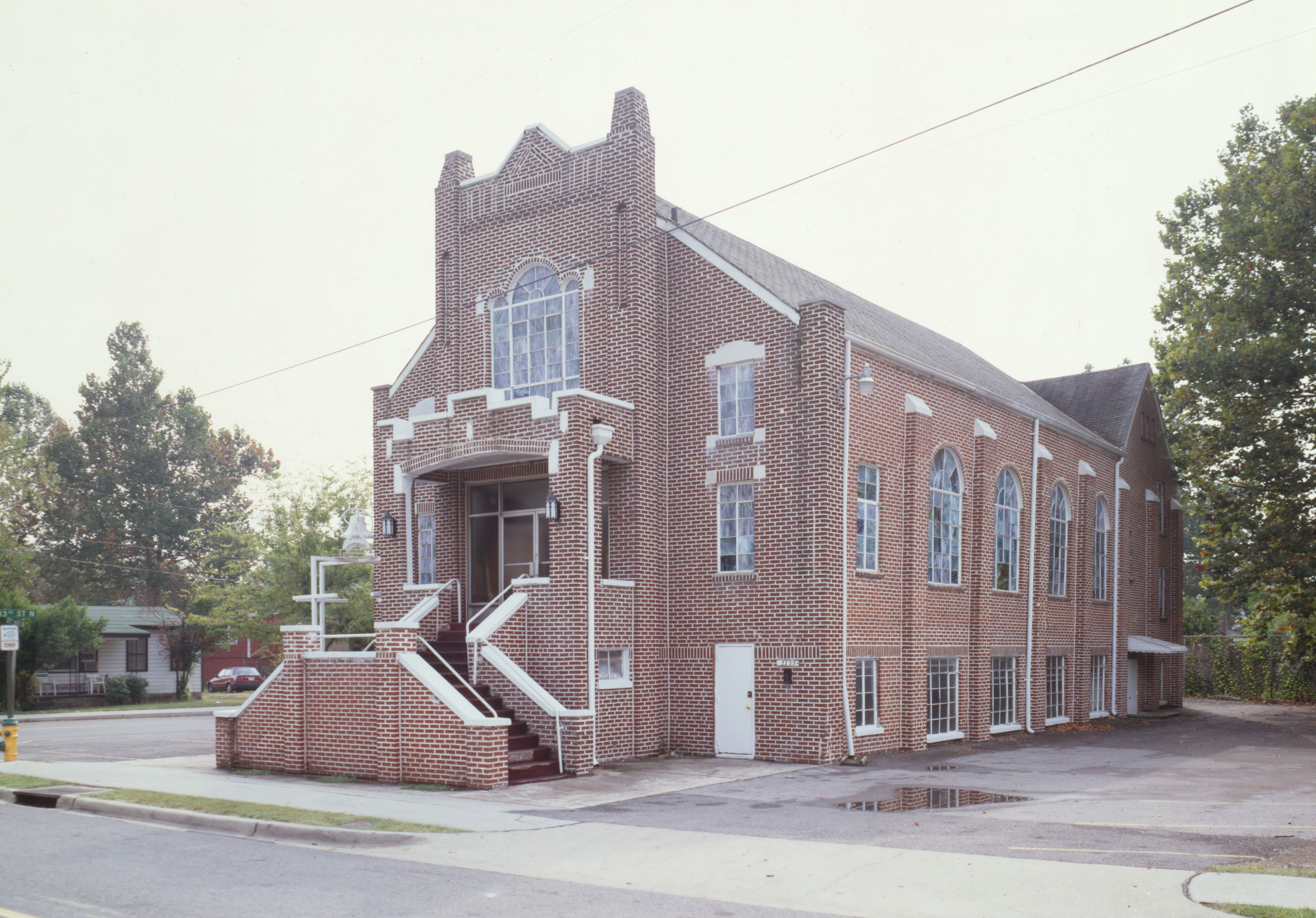
- Bethel Baptist Church in 1993

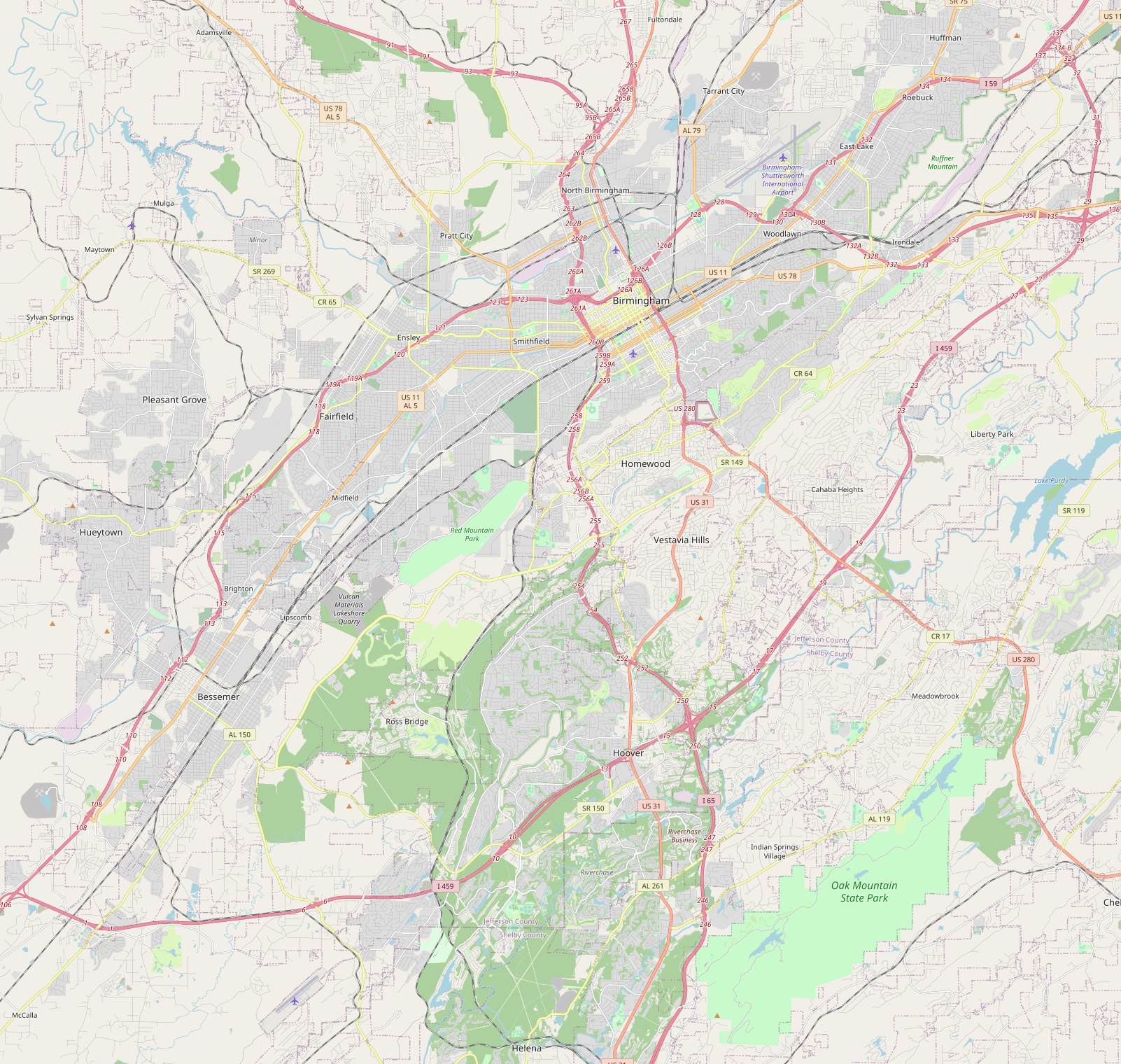
- Location within Birmingham, Alabama Location within Alabama Location within the United States
- Location: 3233, 3232 and 3236 29th Avenue North, Collegeville, Birmingham, Alabama
- Coordinates: 33°33′06.5″N 86°48′07.3″W
- Area: less than one acre
- NRHP reference No.: 05000455

Significant dates
- Added to NRHP: April 5, 2005
- Designated NHL: April 05, 2005
- Designated ARLH: November 13, 1996

Bethel Baptist Church is a Baptist church in the Collegeville neighborhood of Birmingham, Alabama, United States. The church served as headquarters from 1956 to 1961 for the Alabama Christian Movement for Human Rights (ACMHR), which was led by Fred Shuttlesworth and active in the Birmingham during the Civil Rights Movement. The ACMHR focused on legal and nonviolent direct action against segregated accommodations, transportation, schools and employment discrimination. It played a crucial role in the 1961 Freedom Rides that resulted in federal enforcement of U.S. Supreme Court and Interstate Commerce Commission rulings to desegregate public transportation.

== History ==
The church's historic building is located near a newer, modern church. The historic church is located at the southwest corner of 29th Avenue North and 33rd Street North, and its parsonage and guard house located across 29th Avenue North. The church was built in 1926, and is an architecturally eclectic mix of Gothic and Renaissance styles. The guard house and parsonage are vernacular ranch-style houses; the parsonage was built in 1957 as a replacement for the previous parsonage, which had stood next to the church and was destroyed by a bomb in 1956.

Fred Shuttlesworth served as pastor from 1953 to 1961. The church buildings were bombed on three separate occasions, first on December 25, 1956, again on June 29, 1958, and lastly on December 14, 1962.

The church's complex during the historic events of the 1950s and 1960s was added to the Alabama Register of Landmarks and Heritage on November 13, 1996. It was then added to the National Register of Historic Places and declared a National Historic Landmark on April 5, 2005. On January 30, 2008, the US Government submitted it to UNESCO as part of an envisaged future World Heritage nomination (along with the Dexter Avenue Baptist Church and the 16th Street Baptist Church) and as such it is on the UNESCO 'Tentative List of World Heritage Sites'.

In 1997, the church opened a new building near the historic site.

In 2017, the church was included in the newly created Birmingham Civil Rights National Monument.

== See also ==
- List of National Historic Landmarks in Alabama
- List of national monuments of the United States
- National Register of Historic Places listings in Jefferson County, Alabama
