= Alabama Christian Movement for Human Rights =

American civil rights organization

The Alabama Christian Movement for Human Rights (ACMHR) was an American civil rights organization in Birmingham, Alabama, which coordinated boycotts and sponsored federal lawsuits aimed at dismantling segregation in Birmingham and Alabama during the civil rights movement. Fred Shuttlesworth, pastor of Bethel Baptist Church, served as president of the group from its founding in 1956 until 1969. The ACMHR's crowning moment came during the pivotal Birmingham campaign which it coordinated along with the Southern Christian Leadership Conference during the spring of 1963.

== Founding ==
Shuttlesworth, the fiery pastor who took over the pulpit of Bethel Baptist Church in 1953, was already a leading figure in the Birmingham movement. He had led an unsuccessful campaign to convince the Birmingham Police Department to hire black officers and accompanied Autherine Lucy and Arthur Shores in the short-lived integration of the University of Alabama. He was membership chairman for the Alabama chapter of the National Association for the Advancement of Colored People and was the featured speaker in a January 1956 Emancipation Rally sponsored by the NAACP.

Later that spring Alabama Attorney General John Patterson successfully headed efforts to ban the NAACP from conducting activities in Alabama. As a result, Shuttlesworth led a group of 11 pastors and laymen who met at A. G. Gaston's Smith & Gaston Funeral Chapel to outline the creation of a group of "free and independent Citizens of the United States of America, and of the State of Alabama" who would "express publicly our determination to press forward persistently for Freedom and Democracy, and the removal from our society any forms of Second Class Citizenship." The group met on June 4, 1956, and drafted a 7-point "Declaration of Principles":

- As free and independent Citizens of the United States of America, and of the State of Alabama, we express publicly our determination to press forward persistently for Freedom and Democracy, and the removal from our society any forms of Second Class Citizenship.
- We are not echoing the will or sentiments of Outsiders; but our own convictions and Will to be free, so help us God. We will not become Rabblerousers; but will be sober, firm, peaceful, and resolute, within the Framework of Goodwill.
- We Believe in our Courts and in Justice administered by our Courts; but we now point out to the Nation’s conscience a strange paradox: One State District Court Judge can rule and immediately it is obeyed over the entire State—even if questioned or disagreed with; But even a unanimous Decision by 9 Judges of the U. S. Supreme Court (set up by the constitution to be the Highest and Final Court), and Rulings by Federal District Judges, representing the whole United States of America are not only questioned and disagreed with, but Openly Flaunted, Disregarded, and Totally Ignored.
- We Believe in State's Rights; but we believe that any first Rights are Human Rights. And the first right of a State is to Protect Human Rights, and to guarantee to each of its Citizens the same Rights and Privileges.
- We heartily concur in and endorse the Rulings of the Federal Judiciary that All public Facilities belong to and should be open to All on the same and equal terms; and we Hope, Trust, and Pray that efforts to commence should be begun by Officials in the Spirit of Brotherhood and Goodwill; without the necessity of Lawsuits having to be filed.
- We most highly commend the activities of the Officials and Citizens everywhere for the efforts made for Civil Rights, and we thank God for them. But especially do we applaud Negroes in Montgomery, Ala., and Tallahassee, Fla., conducting themselves in the struggle so valiantly, and without rancor, hate, and smear, and above all without violence.
- As to Gradualism, we hold that it means to move forward, slowly maybe but surely; not vacillation, procrastination, or evasion. The hastily enacted laws and inflamed statements of Public Officials do not lead us to embrace Gradualism. We want a beginning Now! We have already waited 100 years!!
- We Negroes shall never become enemies of the White People: We are all Americans; But America was born in the struggle for Freedom from Tyranny and Oppression. We shall never bomb any homes or lynch any persons; but we must, because of History and the future, march to Complete Freedom — with unbowed heads, praying hearts, and an unyielding determination. And we seek Guidance from our Heavenly Father; and from all men, Goodwill and understanding.

The ACMHR was formally created at a mass meeting of 1,000 enthusiastic blacks at Alford's Sardis Baptist Church the following night. Shuttlesworth, acclaimed unanimously as president of the new group, recounted from the pulpit vicious lynchings and gross lapses of justice across the South, concluding that "these are dark days" before announcing that "hope is not dead. Hope is alive here tonight!" A second meeting at Smith's New Pilgrim Baptist Church attracted additional members, including long-time ACMHR corresponding secretary Lola Hendricks.

== Bus desegregation ==
Initially, the ACMHR continued the NAACP's tactics of filing lawsuits challenging enforcement of the city's segregation laws and also modeled itself on the Montgomery Improvement Association in attempting to organize African-American citizens for boycotts and peaceful demonstrations.

Two small actions preceded the ACMHR's first mass demonstration. Two members applied to take the civil service exam in an attempt to become police officers, but were refused by the city's personnel board. The ACMHR sponsored a lawsuit against the board. On December 22, 1956, Carl and Alexandria Baldwin tested the Birmingham Terminal Station's compliance with an Interstate Commerce Commission ruling banning segregation among interstate passengers. They were arrested and a lawsuit was filed.

The first large public action undertaken by the ACMHR was aimed at the city's segregated bus service. After Browder v. Gayle, the decision that ended segregation on Montgomery buses, was upheld on November 13, ACMHR leaders petitioned the city to repeal the ordinances requiring segregated buses in Birmingham. When the city refused, Shuttlesworth organized a display of peaceful civil disobedience in which hundreds of African Americans boarded buses and sat in "Whites only" seats. On December 25, 1956, the night before the protest, Shuttlesworth's house was bombed, blasting him into the basement where he landed, still on his mattress. The fact that he emerged relatively unscathed left Shuttlesworth convinced that he was ordained to lead and contributed to his attitude of fearlessness. The demonstration went on as planned and resulted in 22 arrests, which in turn triggered ACMHR lawsuits asking for an injunction.

In February 1957, the ACMHR signed on as a charter member organization in the Southern Christian Leadership Conference. Shuttlesworth was named secretary of the SCLC. The next month he and his wife, Ruby, again challenged the segregated waiting rooms at Terminal Station. The couple were able to board their train without incident, but Lamar Weaver, a white man who had greeted them, was met by a violent mob outside the station when he tried to leave.

== School integration ==
On September 9, 1957, just a week after black students were escorted by police into Central High School in Little Rock, Arkansas, Shuttlesworth attempted to enroll two of his daughters at J. H. Phillips High School and was met by a mob armed with bats and bicycle chains. Hospitalized but undaunted, he left University Hospital to attend a mass meeting that night, redoubling his message of nonviolence and faith. He pledged to continue the attempts until the schools were successfully integrated and initiated lawsuits against the city's board of education.

== Mass meetings and resistance ==
By 1958, at least 55 "movement churches" were active in the ACMHR. Weekly mass meetings, filled with emotional testimony, music, and passionate preaching, raised an average of about $200–300 per week to fund the organization's lawsuits. Additional funds came from speaking engagements in other cities and from local supporters who did not join the group, including whites who were eager for change but could not risk certain retaliation for showing public support for the movement. In its first three years, the group spent over $40,000 of the $53,000 it raised on legal fees, much of it on black attorneys such as Arthur Shores, Orzell Billingsley, Oscar Adams, and Demetrius Newton of Birmingham and Ernest D. Jackson of Jacksonville, Florida. By 1965, the ACMHR had initiated more federal suits that reached the United States Supreme Court than any other petitioner. As the cases rose through the federal court system, they garnered assistance from the NAACP's legal defense fund.

Organized opponents of integration, including the Ku Klux Klan and the National States' Rights Party, threatened and intimidated movement supporters and conducted numerous bombings of churches and residences. Most of those terrorist acts were never prosecuted and their perpetrators acted with impunity, if not complicity, from city officials and police. In addition, white citizens who appeared uncommitted to segregation were terrorized by extremists. In the face of these challenges the ACHMR increased its membership, stirred at meetings by the Movement Choir, founded in July 1960 and directed by Carlton Reese. A group of volunteer guards stood watch at movement churches and pastor's homes and escorted Shuttlesworth and other leaders to appointments. Detectives from the Birmingham Police Department recorded the proceedings at most movement meetings. According to Colonel Stone Johnson, Commissioner Bull Connor would transfer officers from the assignment once they started to "get religion".

== Freedom Rides ==
In 1961, the ACMHR helped organize the Alabama leg of that summer's Freedom Rides, sponsored by the Congress for Racial Equality. The demonstrations ended with marked violence as one bus was firebombed in Anniston and another was met by an organized mob at the Birmingham Trailways Station with no police in sight. ACMHR volunteers took injured riders to the hospital and kept them in their homes until rides could be secured to safety.

== Birmingham campaign ==
Shuttlesworth and the ACMHR were responsible for inviting Martin Luther King Jr. and Ralph Abernathy to come to Birmingham to lead mass demonstrations in 1963. Though King urged quick action, Shuttlesworth insisted on waiting until the 1963 Birmingham mayoral election was completed to avoid giving candidate Bull Connor any unintentional assistance with voters wary of "outside agitators". On the day after the election, won by perceived moderate candidate Albert Boutwell, the ACMHR distributed a "Birmingham Manifesto", outlining the purpose and demands of the campaign. As it happened, even Birmingham's moderate leaders opposed the campaign on the grounds that the incoming administration should be given an opportunity to lead the city through long-needed changes. King's "Letter from Birmingham Jail" responded directly to local white religious leaders' plea for patience.

During the campaign, Shuttlesworth acted as an emotional leader for ACMHR's local membership while King, Abernathy, and others made attempts to bring uncommitted parties into the movement. SCLC's Wyatt Tee Walker planned the practical details of the early part of the campaign, later joined by the campaign defining efforts of James Bevel of SCLC, by Birmingham residents and activists A. D. King, Edward Gardner, and James Orange, and by others. The movement's joint Central Committee met regularly at the A. G. Gaston Motel to coordinate plans and issue statements to the press. Pickets and marches against segregated stores and lunch counters dragged on through the spring without evident progress.

Bevel then provided the spark by enlisting and training young people in the mass demonstrations. Their Children's Crusade finally fulfilling the goal of "filling the jails" with nonviolent protesters and eventually providing the photographs and news footage of police dogs and fire hoses that shocked the world's sensibilities.

A truce was announced on May 10, but the bombings continued, escalating to the murderous bombing of 16th Street Baptist Church on September 15. The events in Birmingham made imperative the passage of the Civil Rights Act of 1964 and the Voting Rights Act of 1965.

== Later years ==
Shuttlesworth had moved his family to the relative safety of Cincinnati, Ohio, where he had accepted the pulpit at Revelation Baptist Church in 1961. He traveled between Ohio and Alabama as he continued to lead the Birmingham movement. After the major events in Birmingham, the collegial relationships displayed publicly between Shuttlesworth and the leaders of the SCLC and other national civil rights groups began to fracture. Former ACMHR secretary Nelson H. Smith was tapped to head a Birmingham SCLC chapter. Shuttlesworth was left off the podium at the 1963 March on Washington for Jobs and Freedom and was not invited to join the group traveling to Norway to accept King's Nobel Peace Prize.

In 1969, Shuttlesworth resigned as president of the ACMHR and was succeeded by Edward Gardner.
