= List of civil rights leaders =

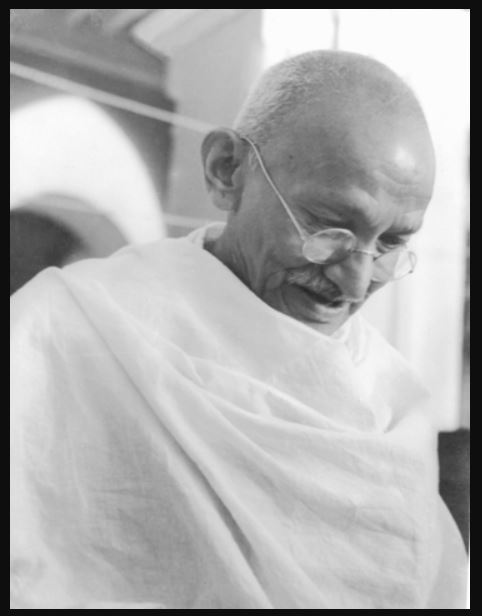
Mahatma Gandhi

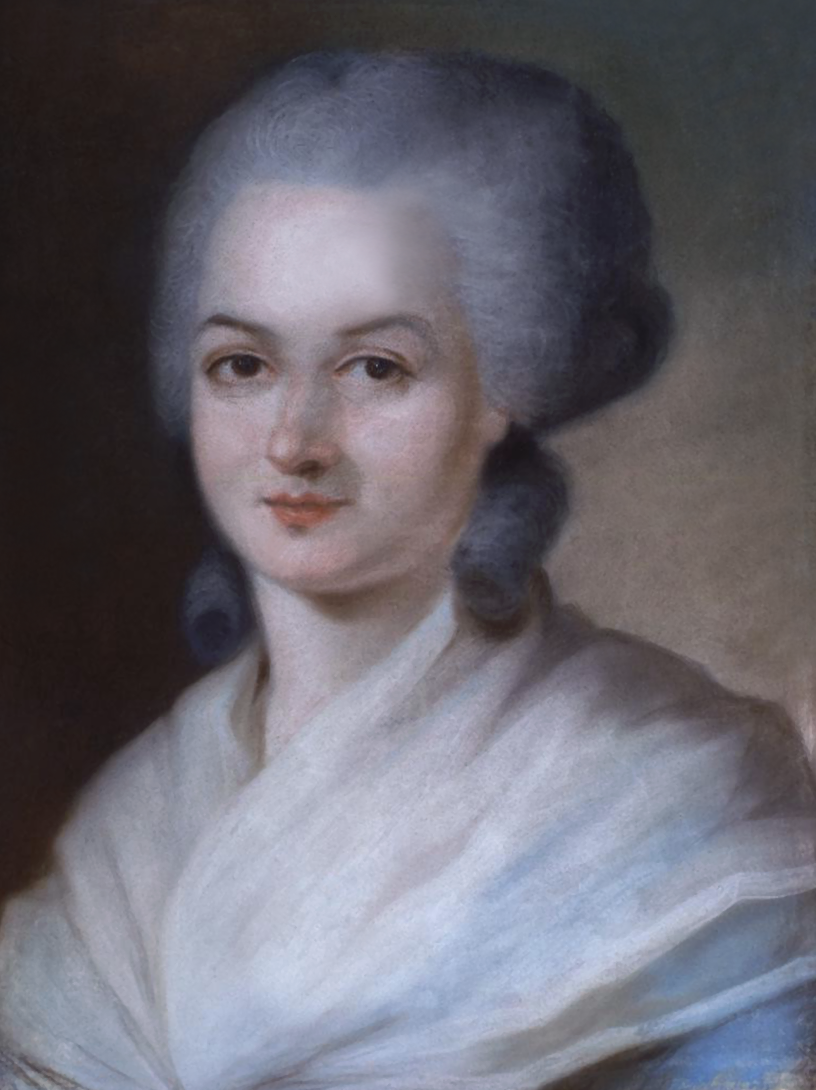
Olympe de Gouges

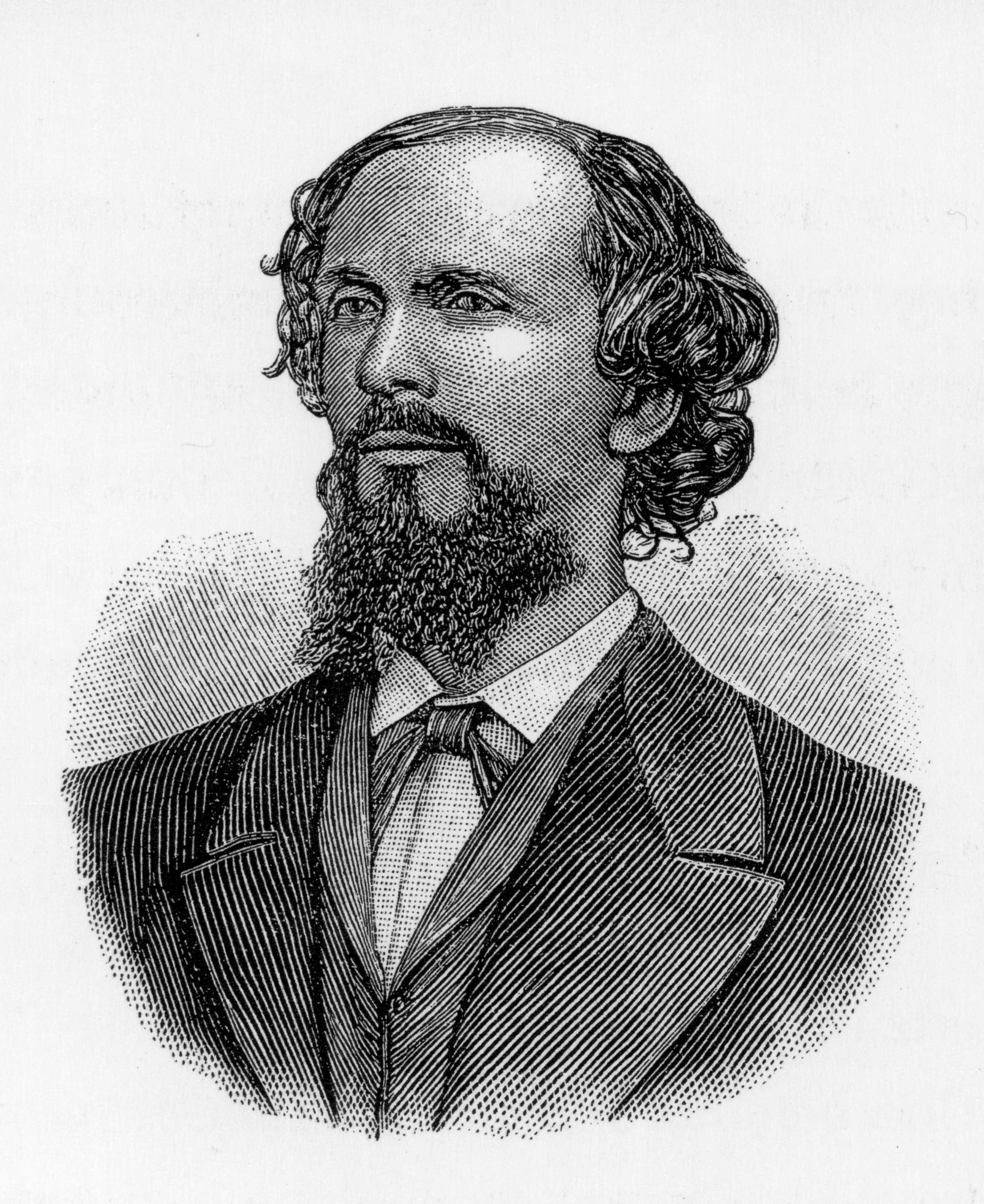
Karl Heinrich Ulrichs

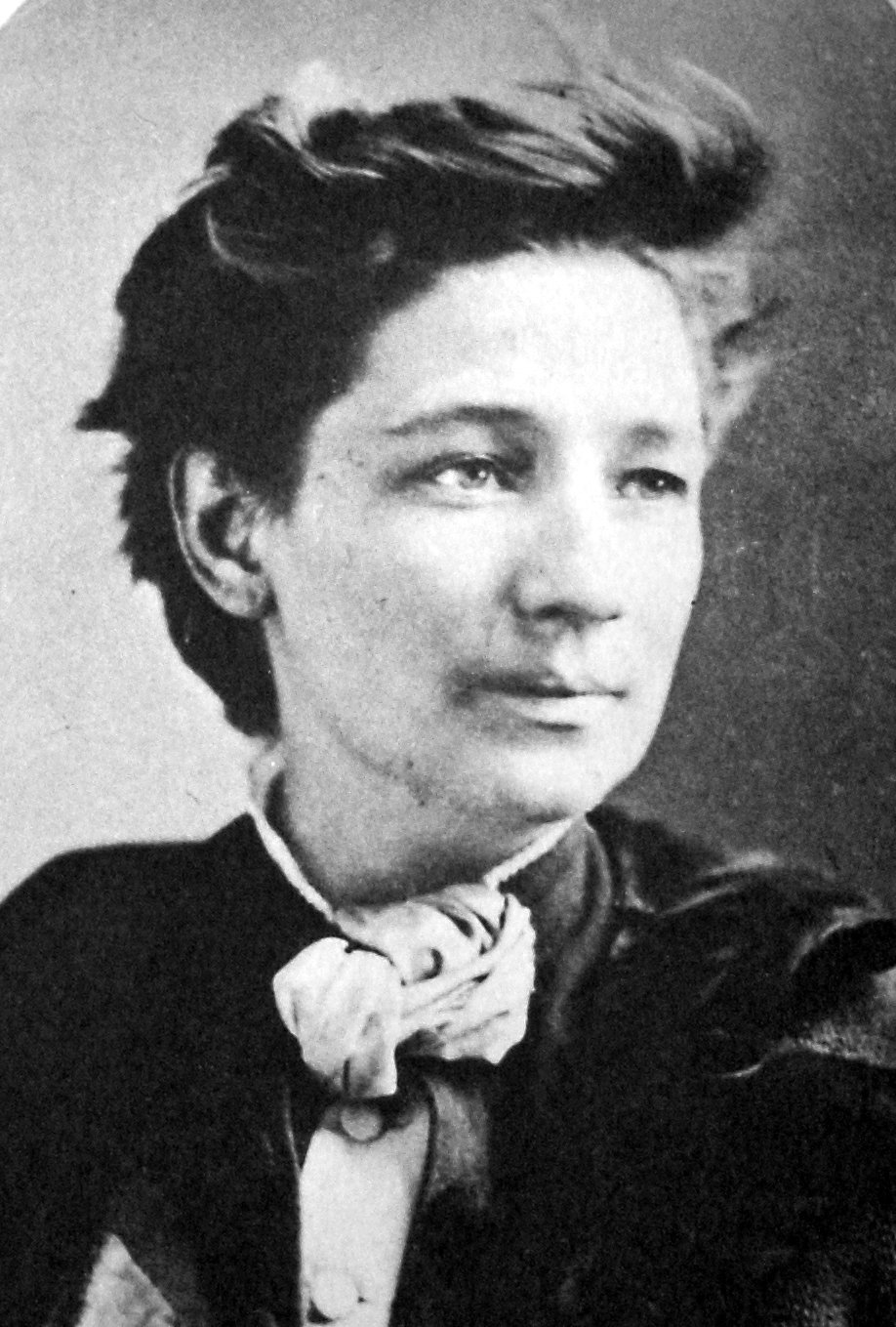
Victoria Woodhull

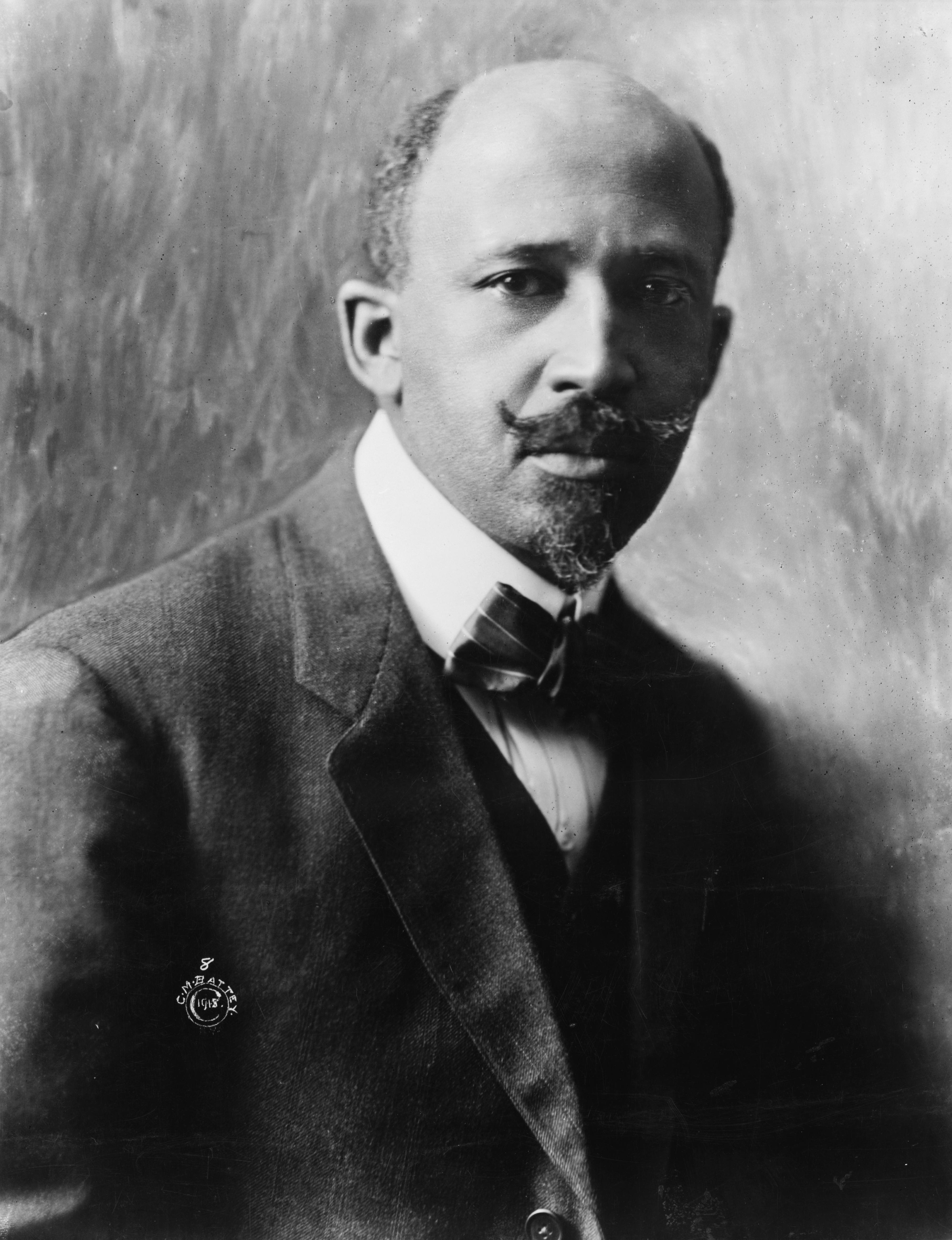
W.E.B. Du Bois

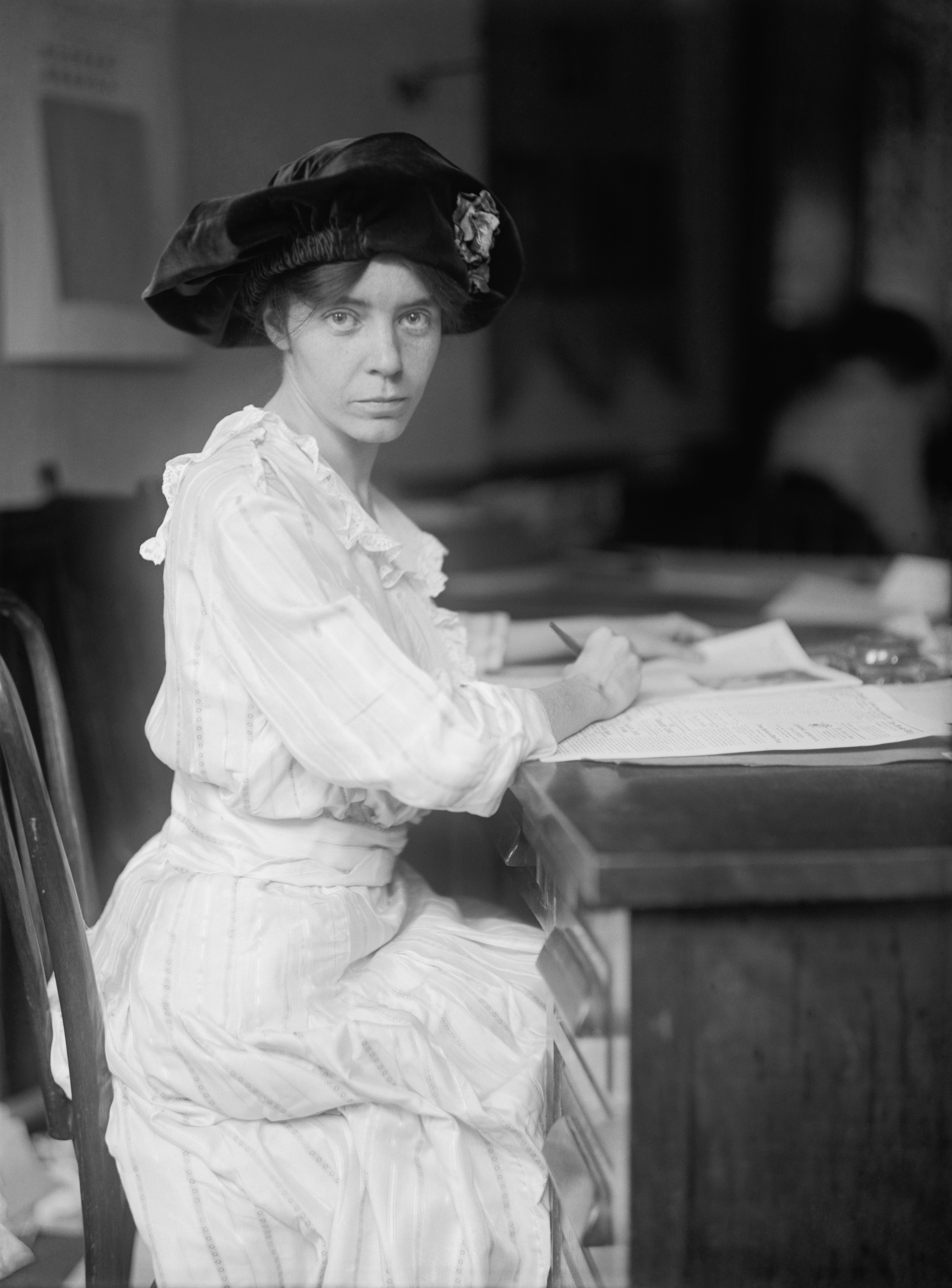
Alice Paul

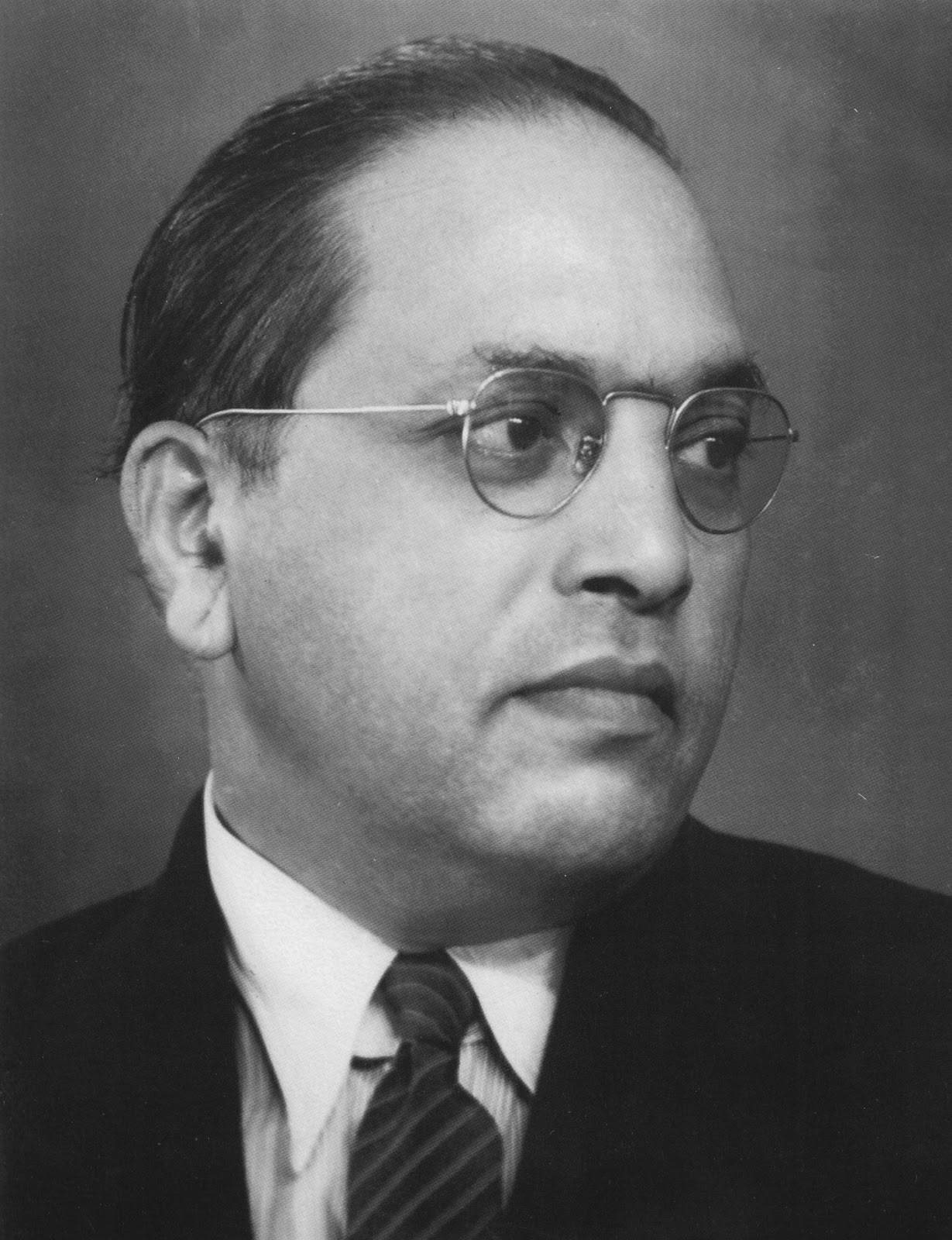
B. R. Ambedkar

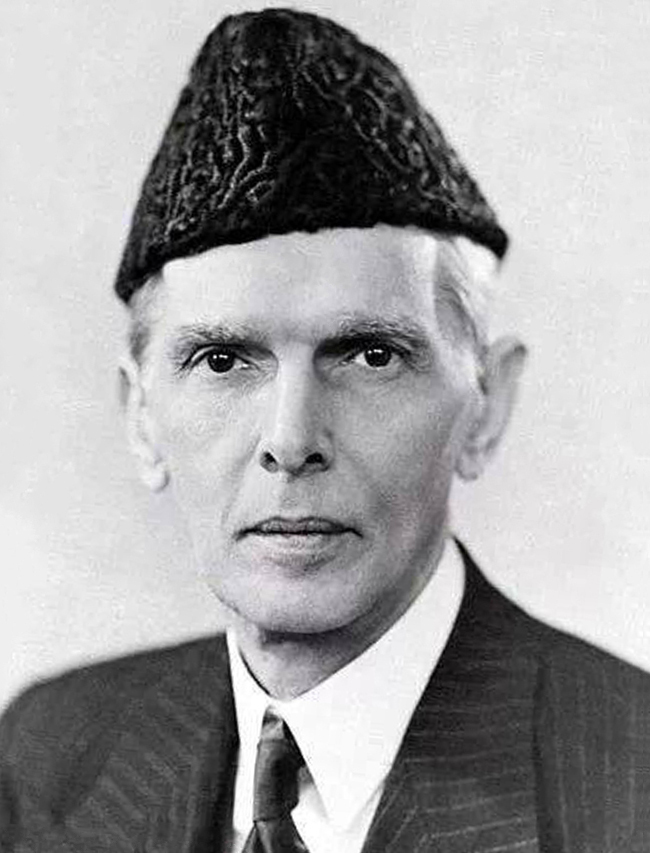
Muhammad Ali Jinnah

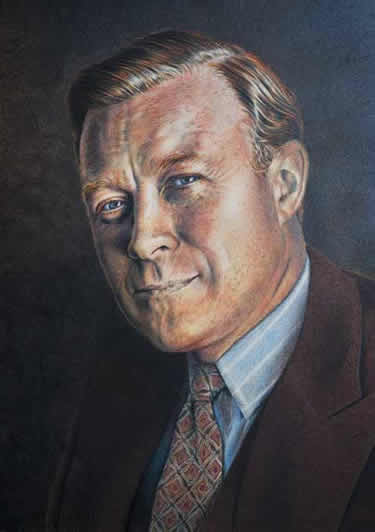
Walter P. Reuther

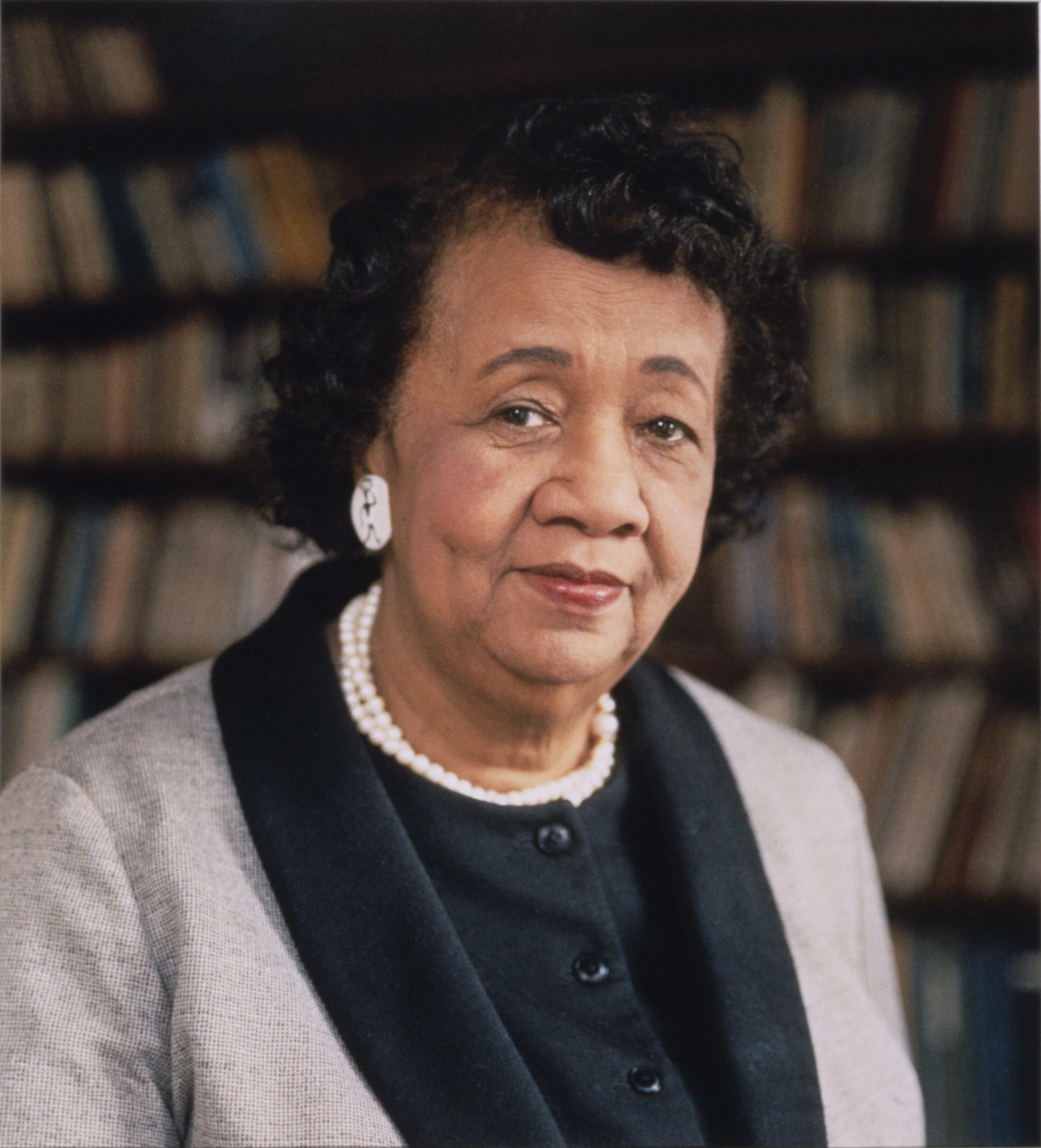
Dorothy Height

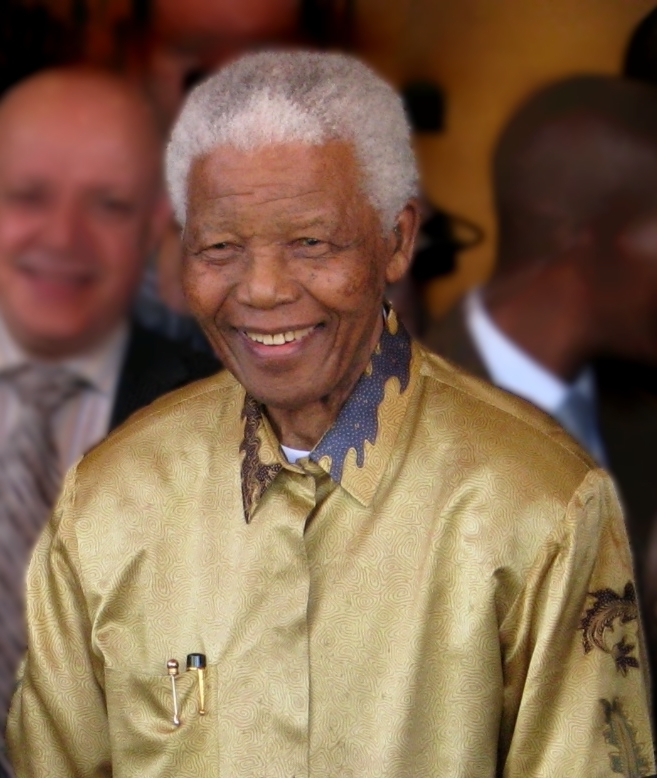
Nelson Mandela

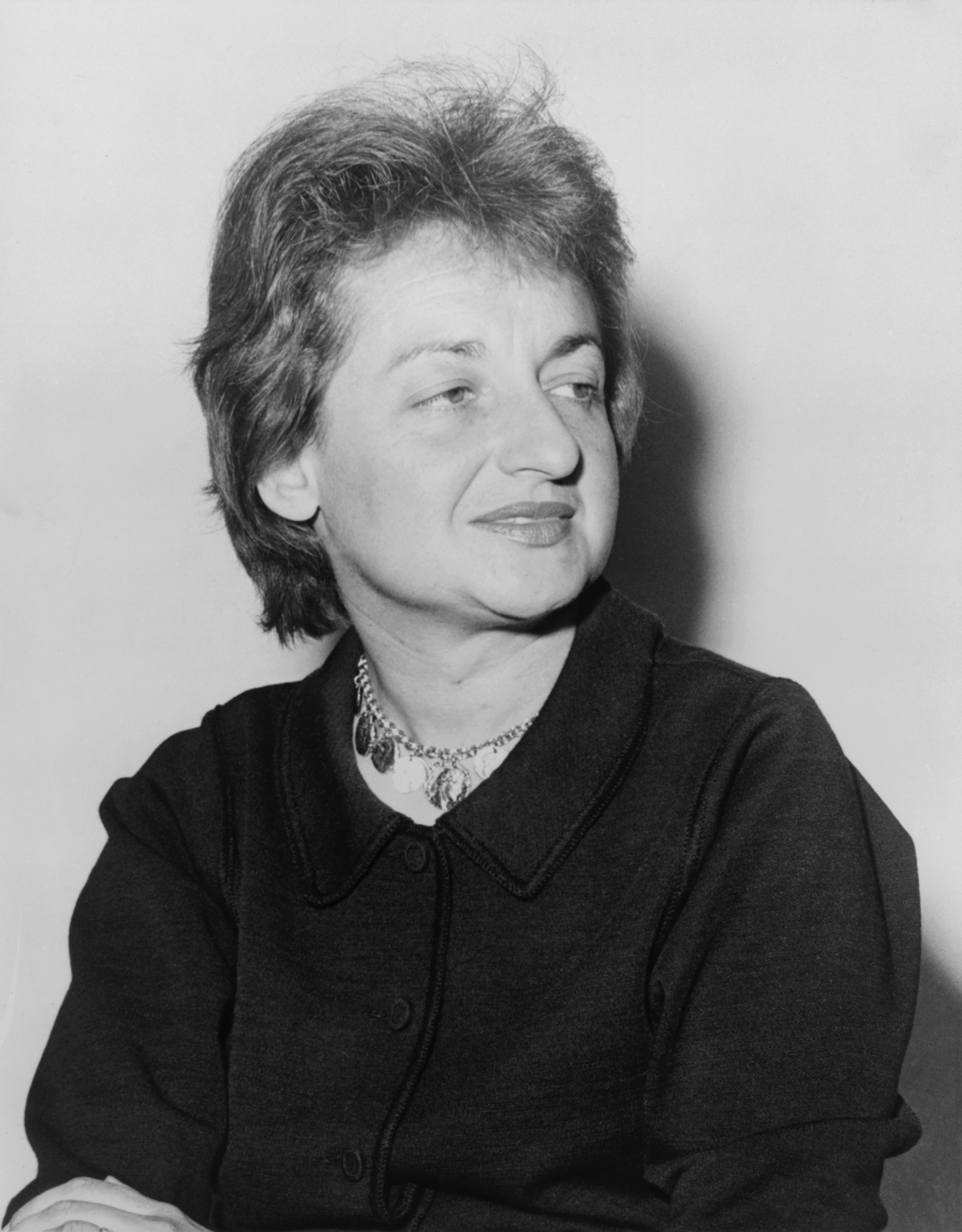
Betty Friedan

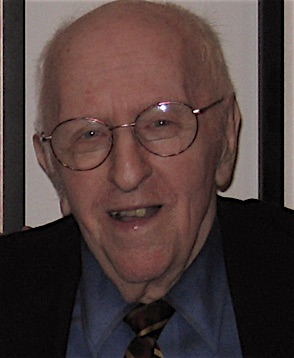
Frank Kameny

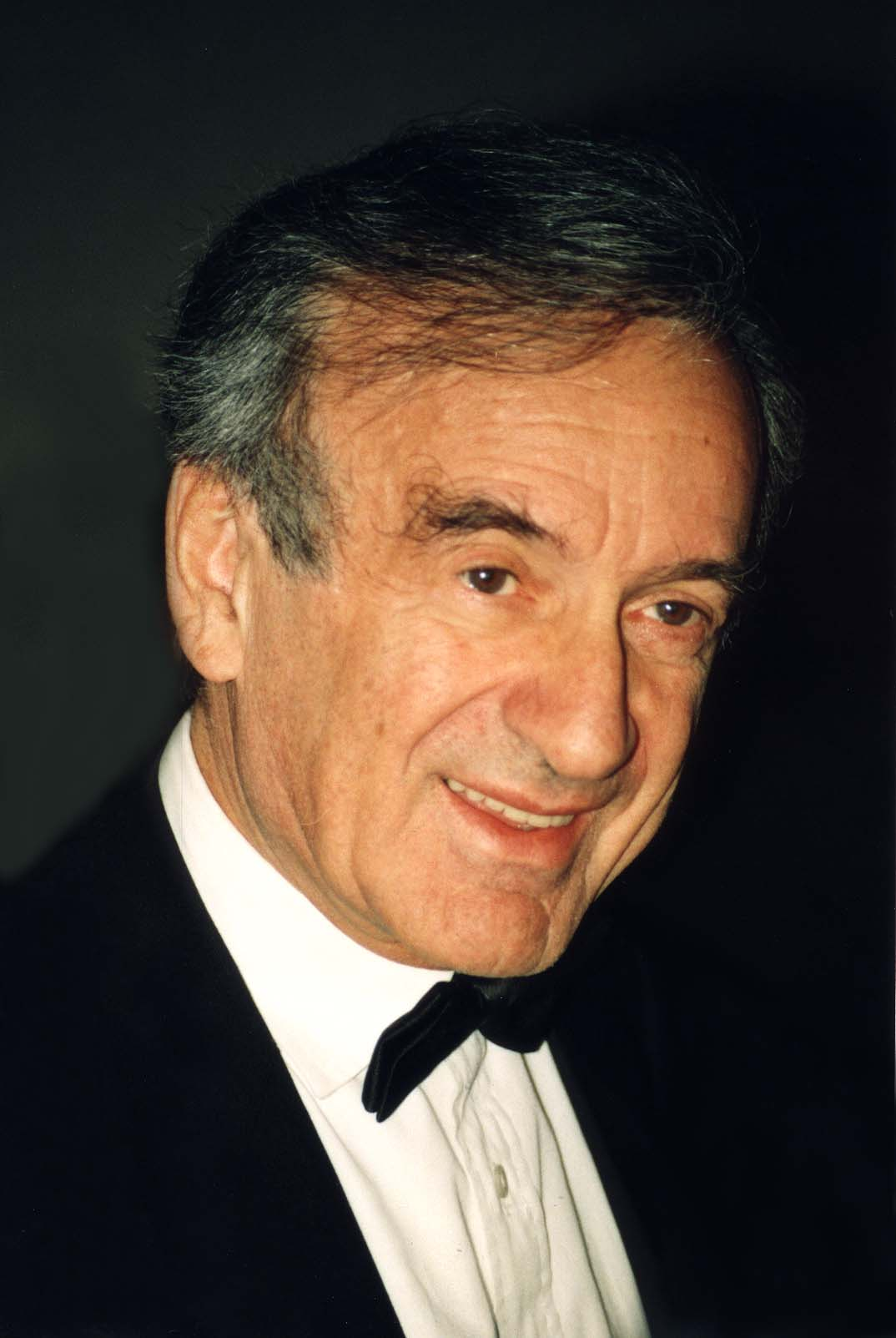
Elie Wiesel

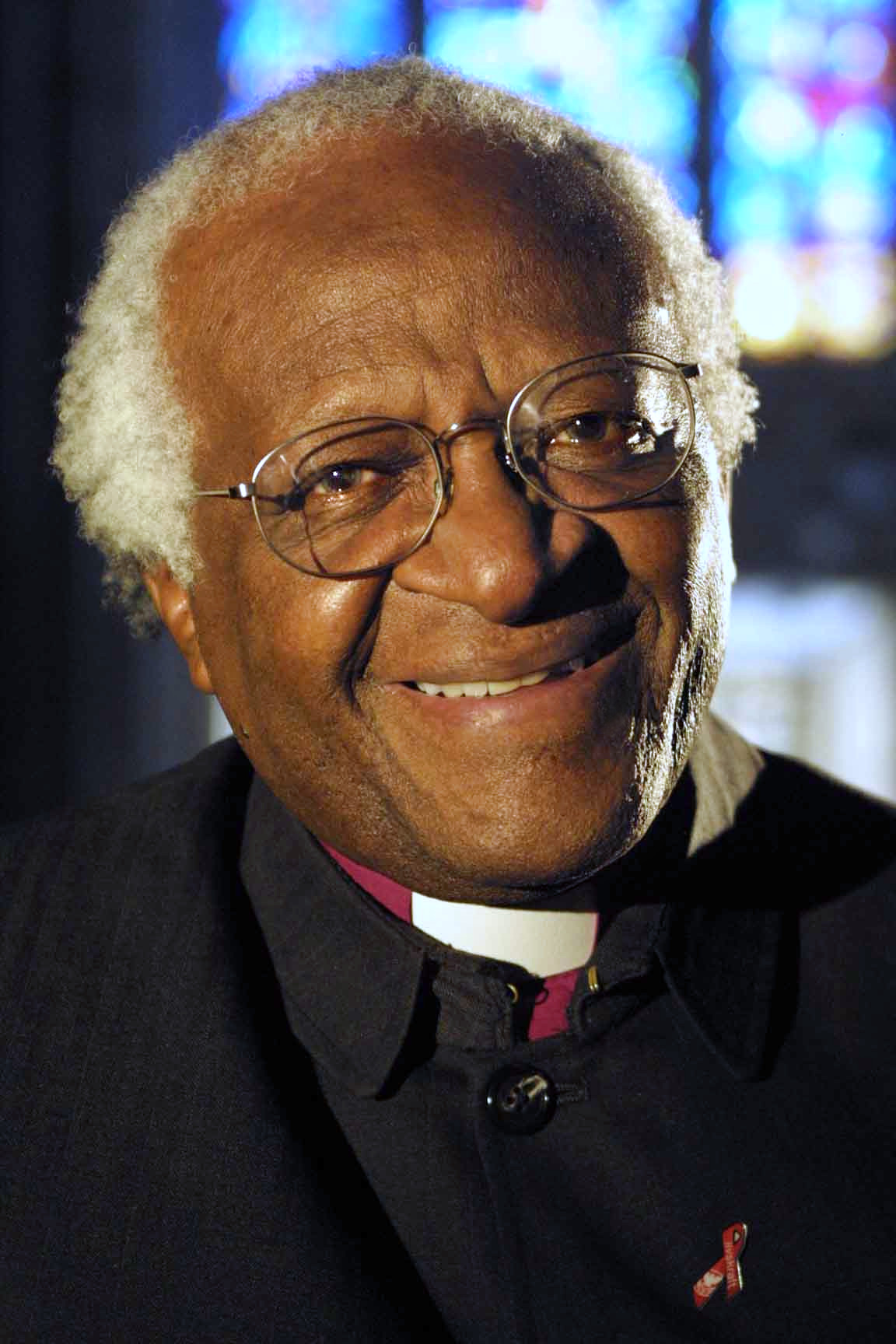
Desmond Tutu

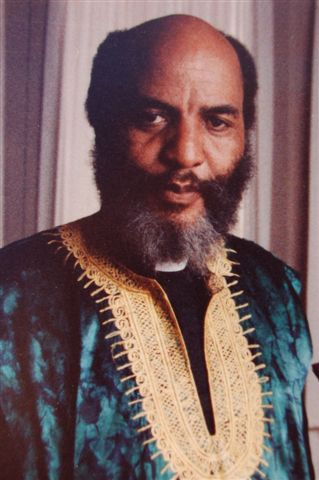
James Bevel

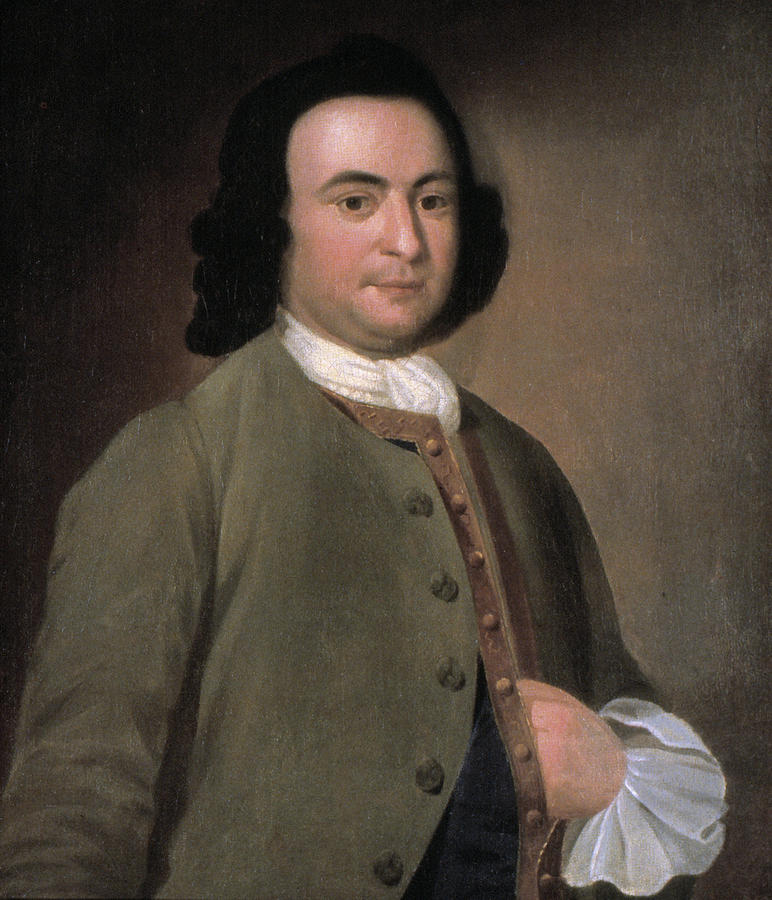
George Mason

Civil rights leaders are influential figures in the promotion and implementation of political freedom and the expansion of personal civil liberties and rights. They work to protect individuals and groups from political repression and discrimination by governments and private organizations, and seek to ensure the ability of all members of society to participate in the civil and political life of the state.

== List ==
People who motivated themselves and then led others to gain and protect these rights and liberties include:

Name	Born	Died	Country	Notes
George Mason	1725	1792	United States	wrote the Virginia Declaration of Rights and influenced the United States Bill of Rights
Thomas Paine	1737	1809	United States	English-American activist, author, theorist, wrote Rights of Man
Elizabeth Freeman	1744	1829	United States	also known as Mum Bett – first former slave to win a freedom suit in Massachusetts
Olaudah Equiano	1745	1797	United Kingdom; Nigeria	purchased his freedom, helped found the Sons of Africa, and wrote the influential The Interesting Narrative of the Life of Olaudah Equiano depicting the horrors of the slave trade
Jeremy Bentham	1748	1832	United Kingdom	British philosopher, writer, and teacher on civil rights, inspiration
Olympe de Gouges	1748	1793	France	women's rights pioneer, writer, beheaded during French Revolution
Ottobah Cugoano	1757	1791	United Kingdom; Ghana	captured from West Africa, he became a member of the Sons of Africa and argued against slavery on Christian and philosophical grounds
William Wilberforce	1759	1833	United Kingdom	leader of the British abolition movement
Mary Wollstonecraft	1759	1797	United Kingdom	British author of A Vindication of the Rights of Men and A Vindication of the Rights of Woman
Thaddeus Stevens	1792	1868	United States	representative from Pennsylvania, anti-slavery leader, originator of the Fourteenth Amendment to the U.S. Constitution
Lucretia Mott	1793	1880	United States	women's rights activist, abolitionist
John Neal	1793	1876	United States	feminist essayist and lecturer active 1823–1876; first American women's rights lecturer
John Brown	1800	1859	United States	abolitionist, orator, martyr
Angelina Grimké	1805	1879	United States	advocate for abolition, woman's rights
William Lloyd Garrison	1805	1879	United States	abolitionist, writer, organizer, feminist, initiator
Lysander Spooner	1808	1887	United States	abolitionist, writer, anarchist, proponent of Jury nullification
Charles Sumner	1811	1874	United States	Senator from Massachusetts, anti-slavery leader
Abby Kelley	1811	1887	United States	abolitionist and suffragette
Wendell Phillips	1811	1884	United States	abolitionist, labor reformer, temperance activist, advocate for Native Americans
Harriet Jacobs	1813 or 1815	1897	United States	her autobiography, Incidents in the Life of a Slave Girl, considered an "American classic." Founded schools for fugitive and free slaves.
Elizabeth Cady Stanton	1815	1902	United States	women's suffrage/women's rights leader
Lucy Stone	1818	1893	United States	women's suffrage/voting rights leader
Frederick Douglass	1818	1895	United States	abolitionist, women's rights and suffrage advocate, writer, organizer, black rights activist, inspiration
Julia Ward Howe	1818	1910	United States	writer, organizer, suffragette
Susan B. Anthony	1820	1906	United States	women's suffrage leader, speaker, inspiration
Harriet Tubman	1822	1913	United States	African-American abolitionist and humanitarian
Karl Heinrich Ulrichs	1825	1895	Germany	writer, organizer, and the pioneer of the modern LGBT rights movement
Antoinette Brown Blackwell	1825	1921	United States	founded American Woman Suffrage Association with Lucy Stone in 1869
Standing Bear	1829	1908	United States	His 1879 court case Standing Bear v. Crook found that Native Americans are legally "persons within the meaning of the law" and have the right of habeas corpus in the United States.
Luís Gama	1830	1882	Brazil	former slave, a journalist, poet and an autodidact lawyer who defended enslaved people and was among the earlier proponents of the abolitionist and republican movements in 19th-century Brazil.
Victoria Woodhull	1838	1927	United States	suffragette organizer, women's rights leader
Frances Willard	1839	1898	United States	women's rights activist, woman suffrage leader
Josephine St. Pierre Ruffin	1842	1924	United States	suffragist, editor, co-founder of the first chapter of the NAACP
Kate Sheppard	1848	1934	New Zealand	suffragist in first country to have universal suffrage
Eugene Debs	1855	1926	United States	organizer, campaigner for the poor, women, dissenters, prisoners
Booker T. Washington	1856	1915	United States	educator, founder of Tuskegee University, and adviser to Presidents Theodore Roosevelt and William Howard Taft
Emmeline Pankhurst	1858	1928	United Kingdom	founder and leader of the British Suffragette Movement
Charles Grafton	1869	1948	United States	Reverend Charles Grafton Archdioceses of Wisconsin Fond Du Lac. Responsible for Rescue helping the Slaves. Under Ground Railroad Initiator Wisconsin Boston, New York, and the Southern States civil rights, known abolitionist. Brought the Convent of the Holy Nativity Nuns to Fond Du Lac, Wisconsin activist, movement leader, writer, philosopher, and teacher Responsible for helping to establish townships all over Wisconsin, and other parts of the United States
Carrie Chapman Catt	1859	1947	United States	suffrage leader, president National American Woman Suffrage Association, founder League of Women Voters and International Alliance of Women
Jane Addams	1860	1935	United States	reformer, co-founder of the Hull House and American Civil Liberties Union, 1931 Nobel Peace Prize laureate
Ida B. Wells	1862	1931	United States	journalist, early activist in 20th-century civil rights movement, women's suffrage/voting rights activist
W.E.B. Du Bois	1868	1963	United States	writer, scholar, founder of NAACP
Magnus Hirschfeld	1868	1935	Germany	physician, sexologist and early advocate of homosexual and transgender rights
Kasturba Gandhi	1869	1944	India	wife of Mohandas Gandhi, activist in South Africa and India, often led her husband's movements in India when he was imprisoned
Mahatma Gandhi	1869	1948	India	the Father of India, greatest unifier of Indians pre-Independence and peaceful activist, Pan-Indian Freedom movement Leader, writer, philosopher, social awakening reg Dalits and teacher/inspiration to many like Nelson Mandela, Martin Luther King Jr.
Sardar Vallabhbhai Patel	1875	1950	India	activist, movement leader, followed and trusted Mahatma Gandhi's Ideology and peaceful movement.
Muhammad Ali Jinnah	1876	1948	Pakistan	lawyer, politician, and the founder of Pakistan; lead Pakistan Movement for the rights of Muslims in the subcontinent
Lucy Burns	1879	1966	United States	women's suffrage/voting rights leader
Homer G. Phillips	1880	1931	United States	Republican political figure, and a prominent advocate for civil rights.
José do Patrocínio	1854	1905	Brazil	journalist, one of the main leaders of the abolitionist movement in Brazil.
Eleanor Roosevelt	1884	1962	United States	women's rights and human rights activist both in the United States and in the United Nations
Alice Paul	1885	1977	United States	Women's Voting Rights Movement leader, strategist, and organizer
Marcus Garvey	1887	1940	Jamaica	political activist, publisher, journalist
Sonia Schlesin	1888	1956	Russia	worked with Mohandas Gandhi in South Africa and led his movements there when he was absent
Toyohiko Kagawa	1888	1960	Japan	labor activist, Christian reformer, author
Bernard J. Quinn	1888	1940	United States	Roman Catholic priest
Jawaharlal Nehru	1889	1964	India	first Prime Minister of India, central figure in Indian politics before and after independence, advocate for freedom of the press
A. Philip Randolph	1889	1979	United States	labor and civil rights movement leader
Abdul Ghaffar Khan	1890	1988	Pakistan	Pashtun independence activist and strong advocate for non-violence. Founder of the Khudai Khidmatgar resistance movement against British colonial rule in India.
B. R. Ambedkar	1891	1956	India	social reformer, civil rights activist, and scholar and who drafted Constitution of India, campaigned for Indian independence, fought for the women's rights, fought discrimination and inequality among the people.
Walter Francis White	1895	1955	United States	NAACP executive secretary
Maria L. de Hernández	1896	1986	United States	Mexican-American rights activist
Thích Quảng Đức	1897	1963	South Vietnam	monk, freedom of religion self-martyr
Albert Lutuli	1898	1967	South Africa	President of the African National Congress, against apartheid in South Africa, 1960 Nobel Peace Prize laureate
Edgar Nixon	1899	1987	United States	Montgomery bus boycott organizer, civil rights activist
Roy Wilkins	1901	1981	United States	NAACP executive secretary/executive director
Harriette Moore	1902	1951	United States	civil rights activist, and part of the only married couple to be assassinated during the Civil Rights Movement
Ella Baker	1903	1986	United States	SCLC activist, initiated the Student Nonviolent Coordinating Committee (SNCC)
Kiowa Costonie	1903	1971	United States	activist against racial inequality. Known for the "Buy where you can work" campaign
Marvel Cooke	1903	2000	United States	civil rights leader
Myles Horton	1905	1990	United States	teacher of nonviolence, pioneer activist, founded and led the Highlander Folk School
John Peters Humphrey	1905	1995	Canada	author of Universal Declaration of Human Rights
Jack Patten	1905	1957	Australia	Aboriginal Australian civil rights activist, journalist, founder of first Aboriginal newspaper, led the Cummeragunja Walk-Off in 1939, protested the persecution of Jewish people, president and co-founder of Aborigines Progressive Association, led the first Aboriginal delegation to meet with a sitting prime minister.
Nellie Stone Johnson	1905	2002	United States	labor and civil rights activist
Harry T. Moore	1905	1951	United States	civil rights activist, leader, and the first martyr of the Civil Rights Movement
Willa Brown	1906	1992	United States	civil rights activist, first African-American lieutenant in the US Civil Air Patrol, first African-American woman to run for Congress
Walter P. Reuther	1907	1970	United States	labor leader and civil rights activist
T.R.M. Howard	1908	1976	United States	founder of Mississippi's Regional Council of Negro Leadership
Winifred C. Stanley	1909	1996	United States	first member of Congress to introduce legislation prohibiting discrimination in pay on the basis of sex
Pauli Murray	1910	1985	United States	American civil rights activist who became a lawyer, gender equality advocate, Episcopal priest, and author
Elizabeth Peratrovich	1911	1958	United States	Alaskan activist for native people
Amelia Boynton Robinson	1911	2015	United States	Selma Voting Rights Movement activist and early leader
Dorothy Height	1912	2010	United States	activist and advocate for African-American women
Bayard Rustin	1912	1987	United States	civil rights activist
Jo Ann Robinson	1912	1992	United States	Montgomery bus boycott activist
Harry Hay	1912	2002	United States	early leader in American LGBT rights movement, founder Mattachine Society
Rosa Parks	1913	2005	United States	NAACP official, activist, Montgomery bus boycott inspiration
Daisy Bates	1914	1999	United States	organizer of the Little Rock Nine school desegregation events
Viola Desmond	1914	1965	Canada	Black Canadian civil rights activist and businesswoman
George Raymond	1914	1999	United States	civil rights activist, head of the Chester, Pennsylvania branch of the NAACP
Claude Black	1916	2009	United States	civil rights activist
Frankie Muse Freeman	1916	2018	United States	civil rights attorney, first woman appointee to United States Commission on Civil Rights
Fannie Lou Hamer	1917	1977	United States	leader in the American Civil Rights Movement; co-founder of the National Women's Political Caucus and Freedom Democratic Party
Marie Foster	1917	2003	United States	voting rights activist, a local leader in the Selma Voting Rights Movement
Humberto "Bert" Corona	1918	2001	United States	labor and civil rights leader
Gordon Hirabayashi	1918	2012	United States	Japanese-American civil rights hero
Nelson Mandela	1918	2013	South Africa	statesman, leading figure in Anti-Apartheid Movement
Jackie Robinson	1919	1972	United States	Broke Major League Baseball's color line with the Brooklyn Dodgers in 1947
Fred Korematsu	1919	2005	United States	Japanese internment resister during World War II
Sheikh Mujibur Rahman	1920	1975	Bangladesh	Father of the nation of Bangladesh.
James Farmer	1920	1999	United States	Congress of Racial Equality (CORE) leader and activist
Golden Frinks	1920	2004	United States	civil rights organizer in North Carolina, field secretary of the Southern Christian Leadership Conference (SCLC)
Betty Friedan	1921	2006	United States	writer, women's rights activist, feminist
Joseph Lowery	1921	2020	United States	SCLC leader and co-founder, activist
Del Martin	1921	2008	United States	co-founder of Daughters of Bilitis, first social and political organization for lesbians in the US
Mamie Elizabeth Till-Mobley	1921	2003	United States	held an open casket funeral for her son, Emmett Till; speaker, activist
Whitney M. Young, Jr.	1921	1971	United States	Executive director of National Urban League, adviser to U.S. presidents
Charles Evers	1922	2020	United States	civil rights activist
Fred Shuttlesworth	1922	2011	United States	clergyman, activist, SCLC co-founder, initiated the Birmingham Movement
Clara Luper	1923	2011	United States	sit-in movement leader in Oklahoma, activist
William Ryan (psychologist)	1923	2002	United States	Civil rights activist
James Baldwin	1924	1987	United States	essayist, novelist, public speaker, SNCC activist
Phyllis Lyon	1924	2020	United States	co-founder of Daughters of Bilitis, first social and political organization for lesbians in the U.S.
C.T. Vivian	1924	2020	United States	student civil rights leader, SNCC and SCLC activist
Lenny Bruce	1925	1966	United States	free speech advocate, comedian, political satirist
Medgar Evers	1925	1963	United States	NAACP official in the Mississippi Movement
Aiko Herzig-Yoshinaga	1924	2018	United States	activist in Japanese-American redress movement
Frank Kameny	1925	2011	United States	gay rights activist
Malcolm X	1925	1965	United States	author, speaker, activist, inspiration
Ralph Abernathy	1926	1990	United States	activist, Southern Christian Leadership Conference (SCLC) official
Reies Tijerina	1926	2015	United States	Hispano activist
Jackie Forster	1926	1998	United Kingdom	English lesbian rights activist
Hosea Williams	1926	2000	United States	civil rights activist, SCLC organizer and strategist
Cesar Chavez	1927	1993	United States	Chicano activist, organizer, trade unionist
Coretta Scott King	1927	2006	United States	SCLC leader, activist
Phyllis M. Ryan	1927	1998	United States	Civil rights activist
James Forman	1928	2005	United States	SNCC official and civil rights activist
James Lawson	1928	2024	United States	American minister and activist, SCLC's teacher of nonviolence in civil rights movement
Elie Wiesel	1928	2016	United States	writer, Holocaust survivor, Jewish rights leader
Martin Luther King Jr.	1929	1968	United States	SCLC co-founder/president/chairman, activist, author, speaker
Edison Uno	1929	1976	United States	leader for Japanese-American civil rights and redress after World War II
Wyatt Tee Walker	1928	2018	United States	activist and organizer with NAACP, CORE, and SCLC
Dorothy Cotton	1930	2018	United States	SCLC official, activist, organizer, and leader
Dolores Huerta	1930	2026	United States	labor and civil rights activist, initiator, organizer
Harvey Milk	1930	1978	United States	politician, gay rights activist, and leader for the LGBT community
Rupert Richardson	1930	2008	United States	civil rights activist and civil rights leader who served as president of the National Association for the Advancement of Colored People (NAACP) from 1992 to 1995
Charles Morgan, Jr.	1930	2009	United States	attorney, established principle of "one man, one vote"
Desmond Tutu	1931	2021	South Africa	anti-apartheid organizer, advocate, first black archbishop of Cape Town
Barbara Gittings	1932	2007	United States	lesbian rights activist
Dick Gregory	1932	2017	United States	free speech advocate, civil rights activist, comedian
Lola Hendricks	1932	2013	United States	activist, local leader in Birmingham Movement
Miriam Makeba	1932	2008	South Africa	singer, anti-apartheid activist
Víctor Jara	1932	1973	Chile	teacher, theater director, poet, singer-songwriter and Communist[2] political activist
Andrew Young	1932		United States	civil rights activist, SCLC executive director
Stanley Branche	1933	1992	United States	civil rights activitst, founder of the Committee For Freedom Now
James Meredith	1933		United States	independent student leader and self–starting Mississippi activist
Violeta Zúñiga	1933	2019	Chile	human rights activist
Roy Innis	1934	2017	United States	activist, longtime leader of CORE
Jane Goodall	1934	2025	United Kingdom	scientist, activist, ecologist
Gloria Steinem	1934	2026	United States	writer, activist, feminist
Bob Moses	1935	2021	United States	leader, activist, and organizer in '60s Mississippi Movement
James Bevel	1936	2008	United States	organizer and Direct Action leader, SCLC's main strategist, movement initiator, and movement director
Barbara Jordan	1936	1996	United States	legislator, educator, civil rights advocate
Richard C. Boone	1937	2013	United States	civil Rights activist SCLC, Chaplain, Major US Army
Charles Sherrod	1937	2022	United States	civil rights activist, SNCC leader
Fela Kuti	1938	1997	Nigeria	multi-instrumentalist, musician, composer, pioneer of the Afrobeat music genre, human rights activist, and political maverick
Diane Nash	1938		United States	SNCC and SCLC activist and official, strategist, organizer
Claudette Colvin	1939	2026	United States	Montgomery bus boycott pioneer, independent activist
Jack Herer	1939	2010	United States	pro-hemp activist, speaker, organizer, author
Julian Bond	1940	2015	United States	activist, politician, scholar, NAACP chairman
Prathia Hall	1940	2002	United States	SNCC activist, a leading speaker in the civil rights movement
Bernard Lafayette	1940	2026	United States	SCLC and SNCC activist, organizer, and leader
Muhammad Yunus	1940		Bangladesh	Bangladeshi social entrepreneur, banker, economist and civil society leader who was awarded the Nobel Peace Prize for founding the Grameen Bank and pioneering the concepts of microcredit and microfinance.}
John Lewis	1940	2020	United States	Nashville Student Movement and SNCC activist, organizer, speaker, congressman
Stokely Carmichael	1941	1998	United States	SNCC and Black Panther activist, organizer, speaker
Jesse Jackson	1941	2026	United States	civil rights activist, politician
James Orange	1942	2008	United States	SCLC activist and organizer, a voting rights movement leader, trade unionist
Gerd Fleischer	1942		Norway	human rights activist
Herman Baca	1943		United States	Chicano activist in California and member of Committee on Chicano Rights
Peter Tosh	1944	1987	Jamaica	Marijuana legalization activist, promoter of the rights of Africans within Africa as well as Black people across the diaspora, reggae musician.
Marsha P. Johnson	1945	1992	United States	Gay liberation activist, STAR co-founder, AIDS activist with ACT UP
Heather Booth	1945		United States	SNCC activist, men's movement organizer, and founder of the Midwest Academy
Angelina Atyam	1946		Uganda	human rights activist for the Aboke abductions
Dick Oosting	1946		Netherlands	human rights lawyer and activist
Dana Beal	1947		United States	pro-hemp activist, organizer, speaker, initiator
Saïd Bouziri	1947	2009	France	Tunisian human rights and immigrant rights activist; co- founder of several human rights groups
Ashok Row Kavi	1947		India	LGBT rights activist, gay rights pioneer, founder of Humsafar Trust
Benjamin Chavis	1948		United States	activist, chemist, minister, author, leader of Wilmington Ten, led Commission for Racial Justice of the United Church of Christ, campaigned against environmental racism, executive director of NAACP, national director of Million Man March
Fred Hampton	1948	1969	United States	NAACP youth leader and Black Panther activist, organizer, speaker
Sylvia Rivera	1951	2002	United States	Gay liberation and transgender rights activist, STAR house co-founder
Cedric Prakash	1951		India	Jesuit Priest, Human Rights Activist, Organizer, Journalist, and Speaker
Judy Shepard	1952		United States	gay rights activist, public speaker
Barbara May Cameron	1954	2002	United States	advocate for the rights of Native Americans, lesbians, and women
Bobby Sands	1954	1981	Ireland	Hunger striker for better conditions for Irish prisoners in British prisons
Al Sharpton	1954		United States	clergyman, activist, media
Will Roscoe	1955		United States	gay rights activist
Rigoberta Menchú	1959		Guatemala	indigenous rights leader, co-founder of Nobel Women's Initiative
Eulalie Nibizi	1960		Burundi	human rights activist, trade unionist
Steven Goldstein	1962		United States	gay rights advocate, political activist
Chee Soon Juan	1962		Singapore	politician, former political prisoner, democracy and human rights activist
Manasi Pradhan	1962		India	women's rights activist, founder of Honour for Women National Campaign
Céline Narmadji	1964		Chad	human and women's rights activist, active in improving conditions for the local population
Deborah Parker	1970		United States	Indigenous rights and women's rights activist who was critical in ensuring the passage of the Violence Against Women Reauthorization Act of 2013
Mariela Belski	1971		Argentina	Executive Director, Amnesty International Argentina
Gloria Casarez	1971	2014	United States	Latina lesbian civil rights leader and LGBT activist in Philadelphia
Harish Iyer	1979		India	gender and sexuality rights activist, campaigner against child sexual abuse and for animal rights
Kate Lynn Blatt	1981		United States	transgender rights activist, Transgender pioneer and civil rights activist Kate Lynn Blatt won a landmark lawsuit against Cabela's Retail Inc. expandng protections for transgender people under the ADA, and became the first trans woman to sue under the Americans with disabilities act
Edvin Kanka Ćudić	1988		Bosnia and Herzegovina	human rights activist, founder and coordinator of UDIK in Bosnia and Herzegovina
Malala Yousafzai	1997		Pakistan	advocate for education for girls, 2014 Nobel Peace Prize laureate

== See also ==
- Abolition of slavery timeline
- Civil rights movement (1896–1954)
- Civil Rights Movement
- Chicano Movement
- Civil and political rights
- Civil liberties in the United Kingdom
- Convention on the Elimination of All Forms of Discrimination Against Women
- Convention on the Political Rights of Women
- Counterculture of the 1960s
- Declaration of the Rights of Man and of the Citizen
- Declaration of the Rights of Woman and of the Female Citizen
- Declaration on the Elimination of Discrimination Against Women
- English Bill of Rights
- Equality before the law
- European Convention on Human Rights
- Founding Fathers of the United States
  - African American founding fathers of the United States
- Free Speech fight
- Free Speech Movement
- History of human rights
- Human rights
- Human rights awards
- International Covenant on Civil and Political Rights
- LGBT rights by country
- LGBT social movements
- List of cannabis rights leaders
- List of human rights organizations
- List of indigenous rights organizations
- List of LGBT rights activists
- List of LGBT rights organizations
- List of Nobel Peace Prize laureates
- List of peace activists
- List of suffragists and suffragettes
- List of women's rights activists
- Magna Carta
- National human rights institutions
- Seneca Falls Convention
- Status of same-sex marriage
- Suffrage
- Timeline of the civil rights movement
- Timeline of first women's suffrage in majority-Muslim countries
- Timeline of women's rights (other than voting)
- Timeline of women's suffrage
- United Nations High Commissioner for Human Rights
- United Nations Human Rights Committee
- United Nations Human Rights Council
- United States Bill of Rights
- Universal Declaration of Human Rights
- Universal suffrage
- Virginia Declaration of Rights
- Women's rights
- Women's Suffrage
