= Oosting =

Oosting is a Dutch surname. Notable persons with that name include:

- Dick Oosting (born 1946), Dutch lawyer
- Gerrit Oosting (1941–2012), Dutch politician
- Henry J. Oosting (1903–1968), American ecologist
- Jeanne Bieruma Oosting (1898–1994), Dutch artist
- Joseph Oosting (born 1972), Dutch footballer
- Menno Oosting (1964–1999), Dutch tennis player
