= Cedric Prakash =

Indian activist and priest (born 1951)

Fr. Cedric Prakash S.J
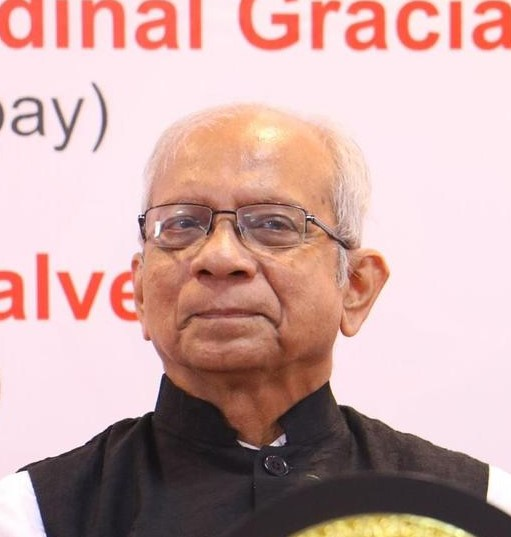
- Fr. Prakash at the ICPA Awards 2021
- Born: 3 November 1951 (age 74); Mumbai, India
- Education: St. Xavier's College, Mumbai
- Occupation: Catholic Priest (Jesuit)
- Known for: Human Rights Activism, Journalism
- Awards: Man of the Year Award (1972); The Kabir Puraskar Award (1995); The Anubhai Chimanlal Nagarika Puraskar (1996); The Rafi Ahmed Kidwai Award (2003); Fr. Parmananda Divarkar Award (2004); The National Minorities Rights Award (2006); Chevalier de la Legion d’Honneur [Knight of the Legion of Honour] (2006); Mother Teresa International Award (2013); Fr. Louis Careno Award (2021)

Cedric Prakash (born 3 November 1951) is a Catholic priest and a member of the Society of Jesus (Jesuits) of Gujarat in India. He is currently based in the city of Ahmedabad, Gujarat in Western India. He is well known for his work on human rights, reconciliation, and peace activism, with a focus on advocacy. He is also a prolific writer on subjects related to social justice, peace, communal harmony, environment, contextual spirituality, and the Constitution of India. His articles are regularly published in newspapers, magazines, and journals in India and abroad. He is also a visiting faculty in some colleges, universities, and seminaries in India, Europe, and the USA. Fr. Prakash speaks four languages: English, Gujarati, Hindi and French.

== Life ==
Prakash was born on 3 November 1951, to Cynthia and Conrad Lobo in Mumbai, India. He was the youngest of four children. His father was an engineer in a sister company of Siemens and his mother was a teacher at St. Joseph's Convent, Umerkhadi, Mumbai. Prakash is a direct descendant of the well-known Mascarenhas family of Kankanady, Mangalore. His great-grandfather Dr. Simon Mascarenhas was a reputed physician of the town. His great-granduncle Msgr. Raymond Francis Camillus Mascarenhas ( today a Servant of God) was the Vicar General of the Diocese of Mangalore and also the founder of the Congregation of the 'Sisters of the Little Flower of Bethany’ (Bethany Sisters).

Prakash received his early education from Antonio D'souza High School (ANZA), Mumbai, and completed his B.A. (Hons.) in Economics and Political Science from St. Xavier's College, Mumbai in 1972.

== Work ==
After graduation, Prakash worked full-time as the National Programme Secretary of the All India Catholic University Federation (AICUF) in Madras for one year. During that period he traveled the length and breadth of the country encouraging youth to serve the poor and marginalized through 'Project Know India'.

For a year after that he was based in the French ecumenical community TAIZE as part of a 14-member intercontinental team (equipe) to help prepare the ‘World Council of Youth’ of 1974. He traveled to several European countries for this preparatory process interacting and encouraging youth towards a more meaningful life in the service of others.

On 16 July 1974, Prakash entered in Ahmedabad, the Jesuit Novitiate of the Gujarat province of the Society of Jesus. Two years later, on 31 July 1976, he pronounced his First Vows (of poverty, chastity and obedience) in the Society of Jesus. From April 1977 to May 1979, Prakash did his regency as a Jesuit scholastic in the tribal area of Bhiloda, North Gujarat. Here he worked extensively in helping to improve literacy levels, health facilities, and the cultural upliftment of the Adivasis who lived in the area. In June 1979, he began his studies in philosophy at the Sacred Heart College in Shembaganur (Kodaikanal). The following year (1980) this college was shifted to its current location at Satya Nilayam in Chennai, from where Prakash obtained his degree in philosophy. For one year, Prakash then served as a warden of a residential technical school for boys run by Jesuits in Sevasi, Baroda. From 1982 to 1985, Prakash did his studies in theology; part of these studies was also held at Vidya Jyoti (VJ), a Jesuit Theology Institute in Delhi. In the aftermath of the targeted violence against the Sikh community in November 1984, Prakash was one of the coordinators from VJ for relief and rehabilitation work for the affected/displaced Sikhs; he was also involved in reconciliation and peace work at that time.

On 27 April 1985, Fr. Prakash was ordained a priest in St. Peter’s Church, Bandra, Mumbai by Bishop Ferdinand Fonseca, the Auxiliary Bishop of the Archdiocese of Bombay.

In May 1985, Prakash was appointed to work in the remote areas of Umarpada, South Gujarat among the Vasava and Chaudhary Adivasi communities. He worked here for the rights of the tribals and their socio-cultural empowerment. In April 1987, Fr. Prakash was appointed the Director of St. Xavier’s Social Service Society (SXSSS). In this capacity, together with a dedicated team he was involved in the inter-related areas of Innovative Education, Community Health, the Organization of people and on environmental issues. He also initiated the Centre for Orientation, Documentation and Research (CORD) and SHANTI, an initiative for inter-religious dialogue, communal harmony and peace. The activities of SXSSS were in the slums of Ahmedabad and in the rural areas of North and Central Gujarat. Prakash was for several years a Counterpart of the US-based Catholic Relief Services (CRS) for North and Central Gujarat.

In June 1992, Fr. Prakash was one of the NGO delegates from India, at the United Nations Conference on Environment and Development (UNCED), also known as the ‘Earth Summit’ in Rio de Janeiro, Brazil. In September 1994, he participated in the International Conference on Population and Development (ICPD) in Cairo, Egypt. In June 1997, Fr. Prakash participated in the European Ecumenical Assembly at Graz, Austria. In the wake of the devastating earthquake that hit several parts of Gujarat on 26 January 2001 (and later) Fr. Prakash coordinated an Earthquake Relief and Rehabilitation Service (EARRS). The platform that brought together several concerned organizations and individuals worked towards the immediate relief and rehabilitation of those affected by the earthquake. Distribution of food and other materials were also undertaken. Fr. Prakash was also responsible for receiving directly from the US Government and distributing a huge consignment of relief materials to the affected persons.

== Activism and organisational leadership ==
On 2 October 2001, Fr. Prakash founded Prashant, the Ahmedabad-based Jesuit Centre for Human Rights, Justice and Peace and was the Director of this Centre till January 2016. Prashant was also the Province Office for Integral Social Development (POISD) of the Gujarat Jesuits- dedicated to coordinate developmental, justice and peace works of the province. Fr. Prakash also served as the Secretary of Social Communications – C.B.C.I. (Western Region), National Vice-President – Peoples' Union for Human Rights (PUHR).

For three years (2016-2018), Fr. Prakash was based in Beirut, Lebanon in the Regional Office of the Jesuit Refugee Service (Middle East and North Africa Region) as the Regional Advocacy and Communications Officer/Advisor, working with refugees and Internally Displaced Persons (IDPs) in Syria, Jordan, Iraq, and Lebanon. In collaboration with St Joseph's University, Beirut he headed and in September 2018 completed a path-breaking research study, ‘Journeying Together’ on the situation of the Syrian refugees in Lebanon.

== Awards ==
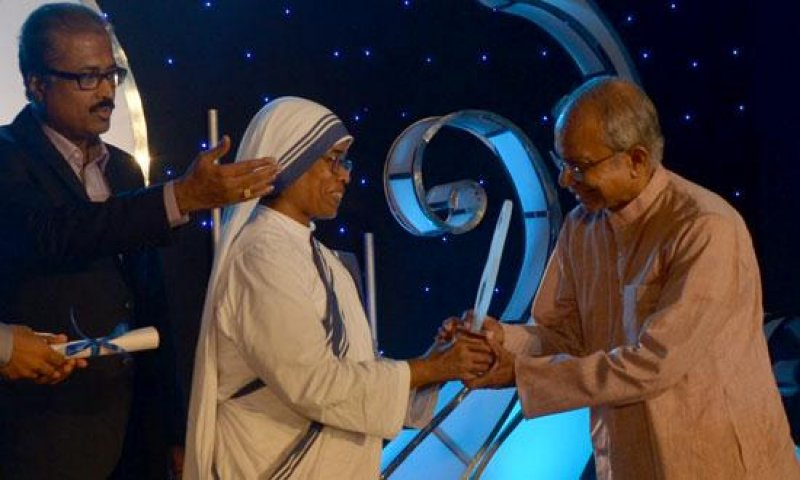
Fr. Cedric Prakash conferred The Mother Teresa International Award in 2013

In 1996, Fr. Prakash was awarded The Anubhai Chimanlal Nagarika Puraskar by the Mayor of Ahmedabad for his contribution to the city of Ahmedabad, India. He was also conferred the Kabir Puraskar by the President of India for his work in the promotion of Communal Harmony and Peace in 1995. In 2006, Fr. Prakash was named Chevalier of the Legion of Honor, one of the highest French civilian awards, acknowledging his commitment to the defense and the promotion of human rights in India.

Fr. Prakash has also been awarded the Rafi Ahmed Kidwai Award presented for Humanitarian Work by the Indian Muslim Council, US, in 2003. He also received the Fr. Parmananda Divarkar Award for Communication for Peace in January 2004 for promoting dialogue for peace and inter-community harmony. In 2006, he received the Minorities Rights Award by the National Commission for Minorities of the Government of India.

The Marquette University in Wisconsin, US, honored him as the Wade Chair Scholar for the academic year 2009 – 2010. Fr. Prakash was one of the recipients of Mother Teresa Awards for Social Justice in 2013. On 1 December 2021, Fr. Prakash was conferred the Fr. Louis Careno Award by the Indian Catholic Press Association (ICPA) in Mumbai for his courageous contribution to journalism and bold writings on socio-cultural and political issues, especially relating to communalism and fundamentalism.

Fr. Prakash received the Lifetime Achievement Award from The Federation of Konkani Catholic Associations (FKCA - a premier umbrella organization representing 33 Konkani Catholic Associations in India and overseas) on 5 June 2022 for his work as a human rights and peace activist and his service to the marginalized communities in India.

== Publications ==
In October 2018, the Loyola Press Chicago published a coffee-table-style book ‘Sharing the Wisdom of Time’ by Pope Francis and Friends. One of Fr. Prakash's real-life stories is featured in it. Pope Francis has written a warm personal response in the book to Fr. Prakash's testimony.

== Gallery ==
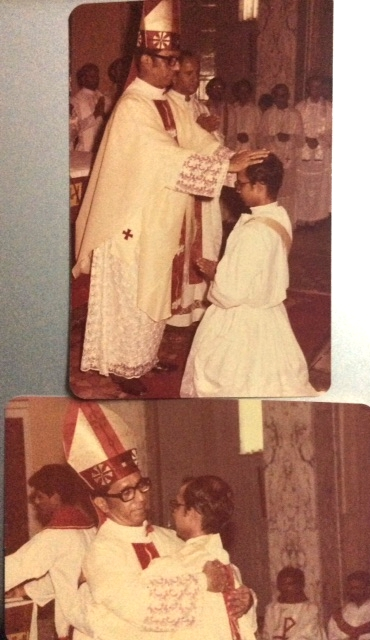
Fr. Cedric Prakash on the day of his ordination by Bishop Ferdinand Fonseca of Bombay on 27 April 1985 at St. Peter's Church, Bandra, Mumbai.

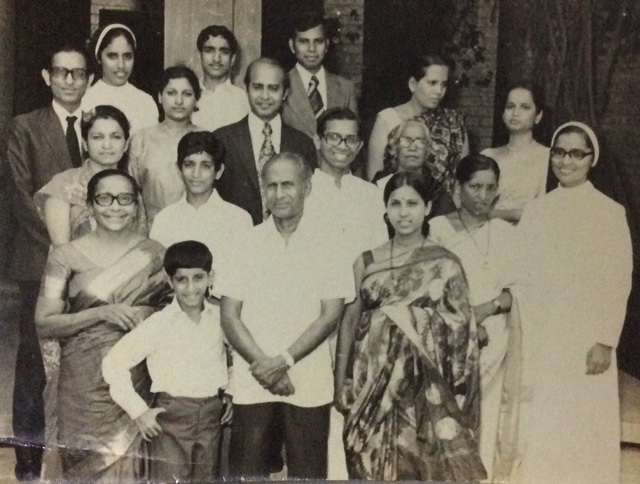
Fr. Cedric Prakash with immediate family relatives and friends on his on 'First Vows Day' 31 July 1976 in Ahmedabad, Gujarat.

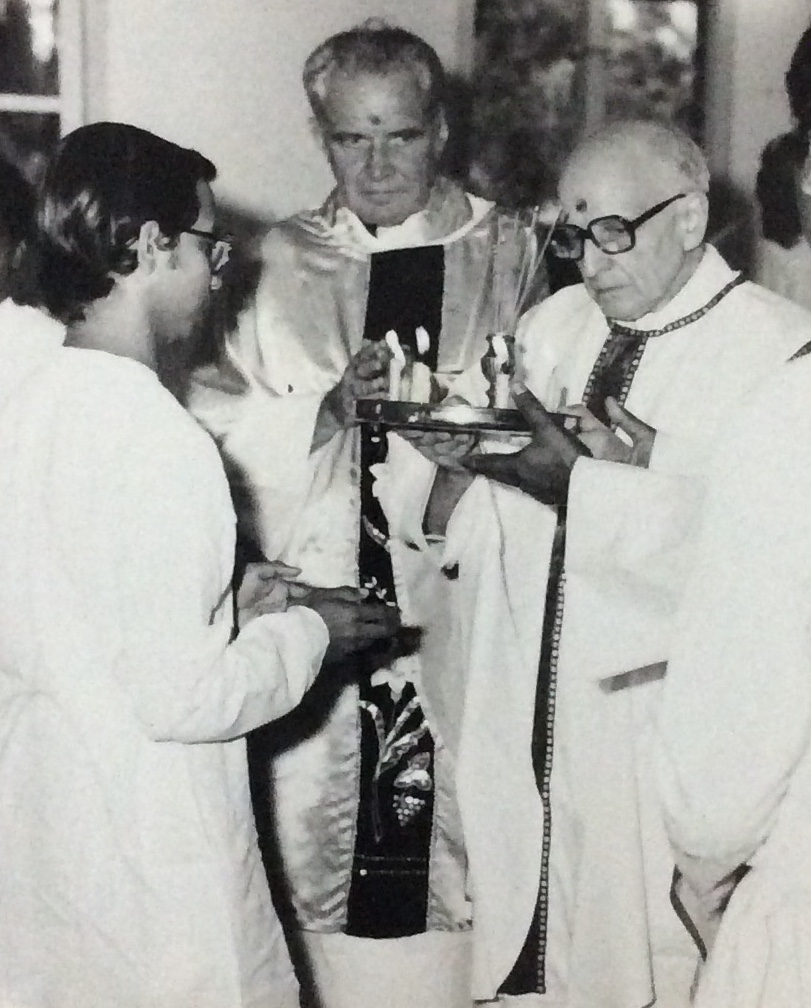
Fr. Cedric Prakash with Fr. Pedro Arrupe, the then Superior General of the Jesuits in Chennai (June 1980).

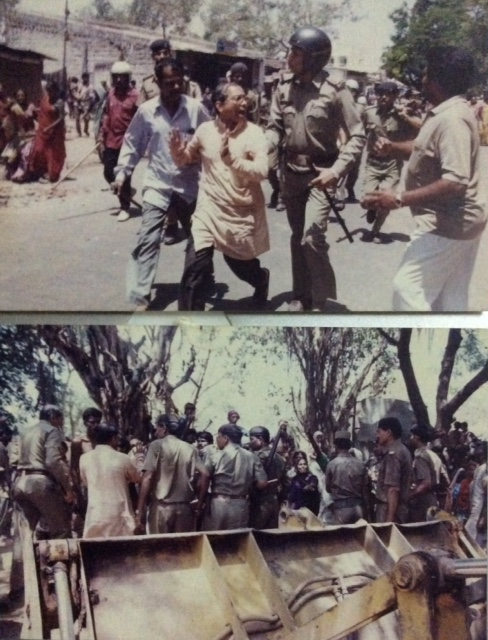
Fr. Cedric Prakash being detained whilst protesting against the bulldozing of slum tenements in Ahmedabad, Gujarat in May 2000.

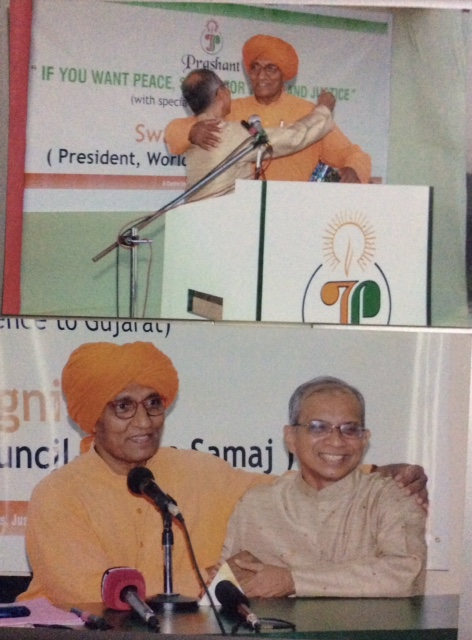
Fr. Cedric Prakash with Swami Agnivesh in Ahmedabad on 2 October 2007

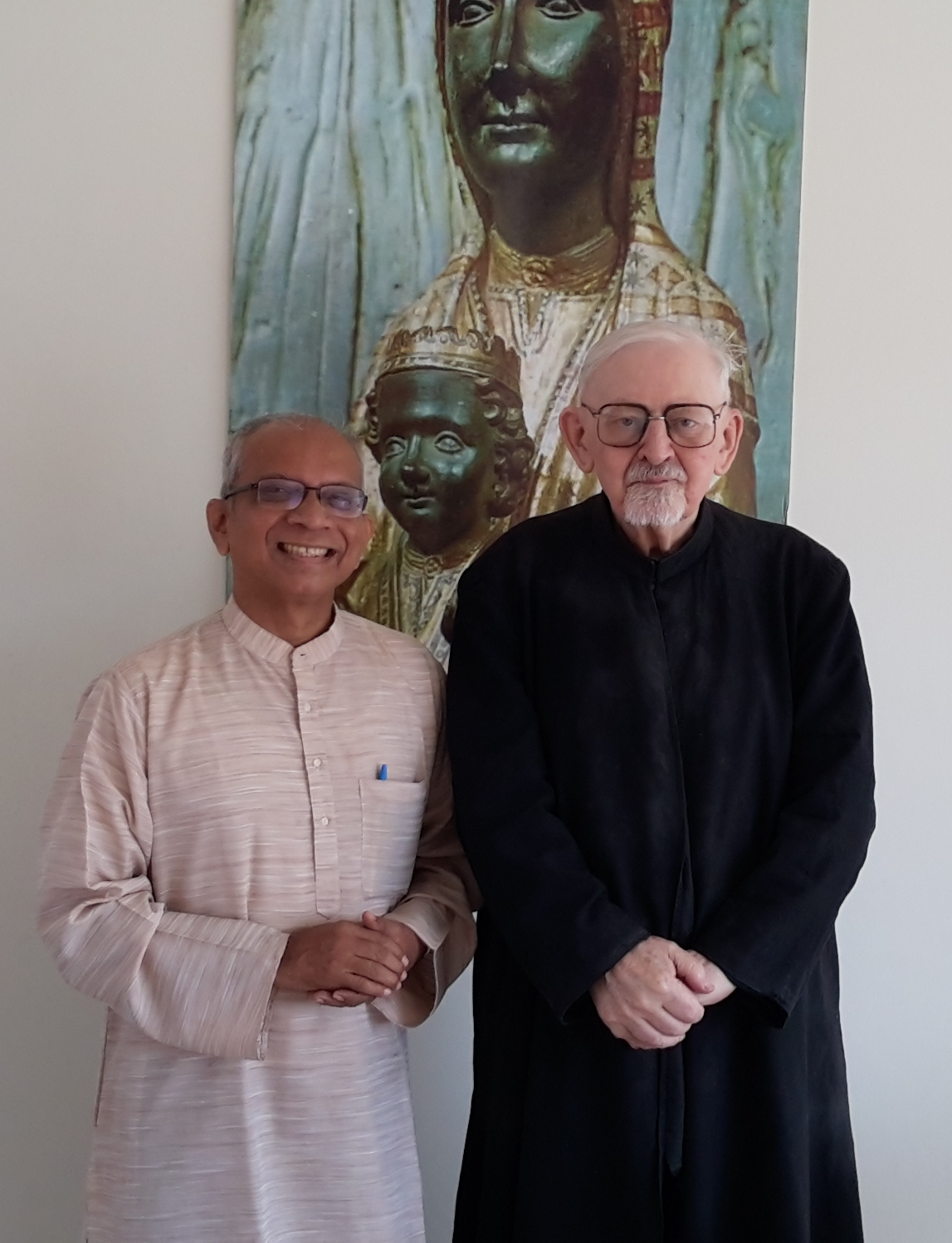
Fr. Cedric Prakash with Fr. Peter Hans Kolvenbach, the former Superior General of the Jesuits in Beirut, Lebanon on July 11, 2016.

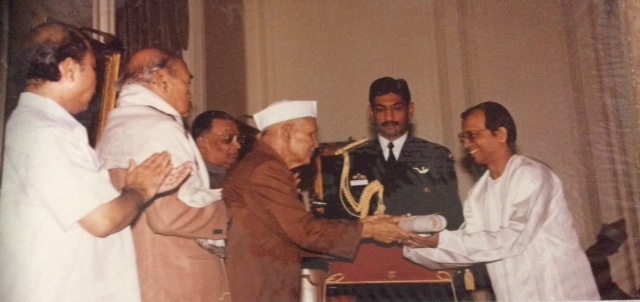
Fr. Cedric Prakash receiving the 'Kabir Puraskar' from President Shankar Dayal Sharma in November 1995.

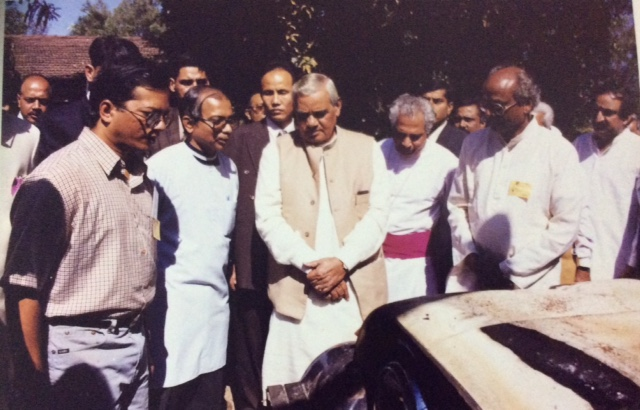
Fr. Cedric Prakash briefing Prime Minister Atal Bihari Vajpayee about the attacks on the Christians in the Dangs (January 1999)

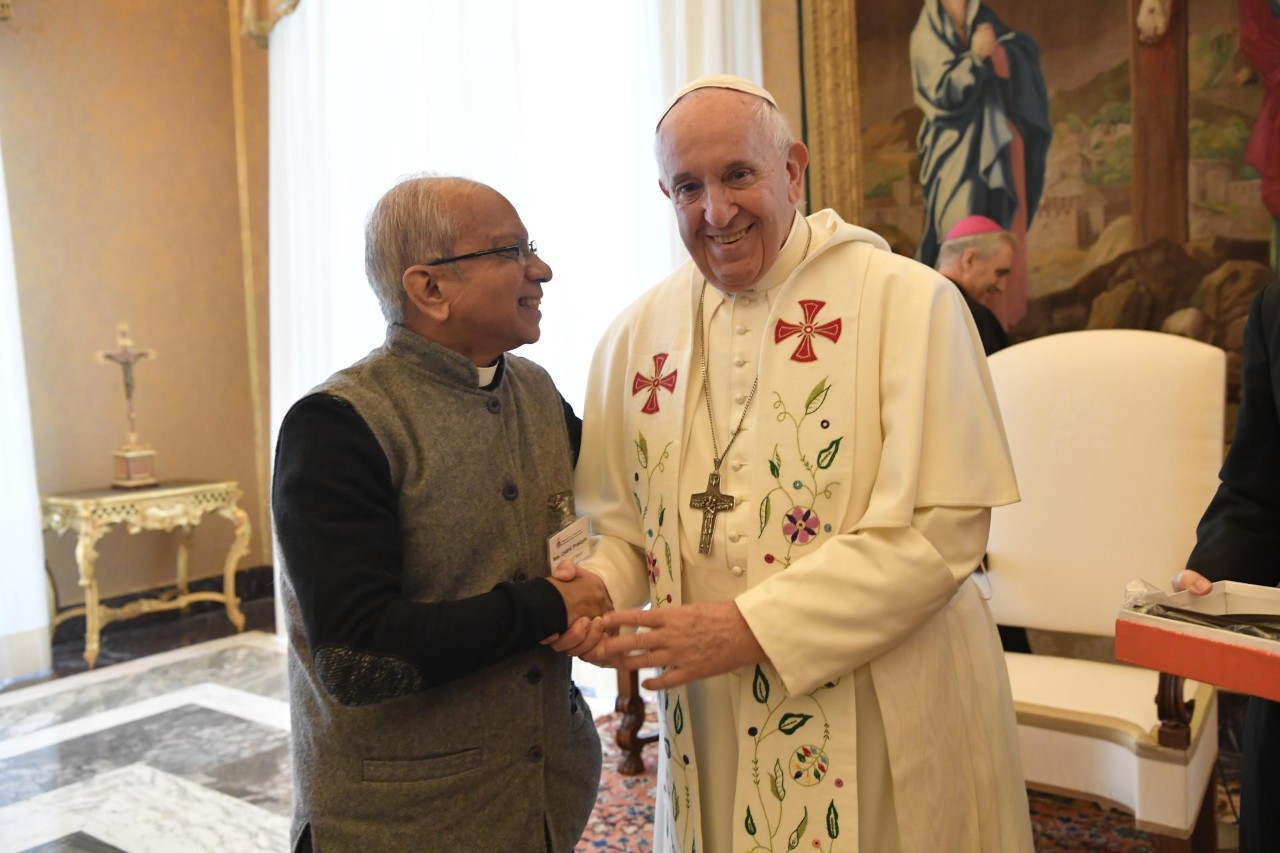
Fr. Cedric Prakash with Pope Francis in Vatican on 7 December 2019.

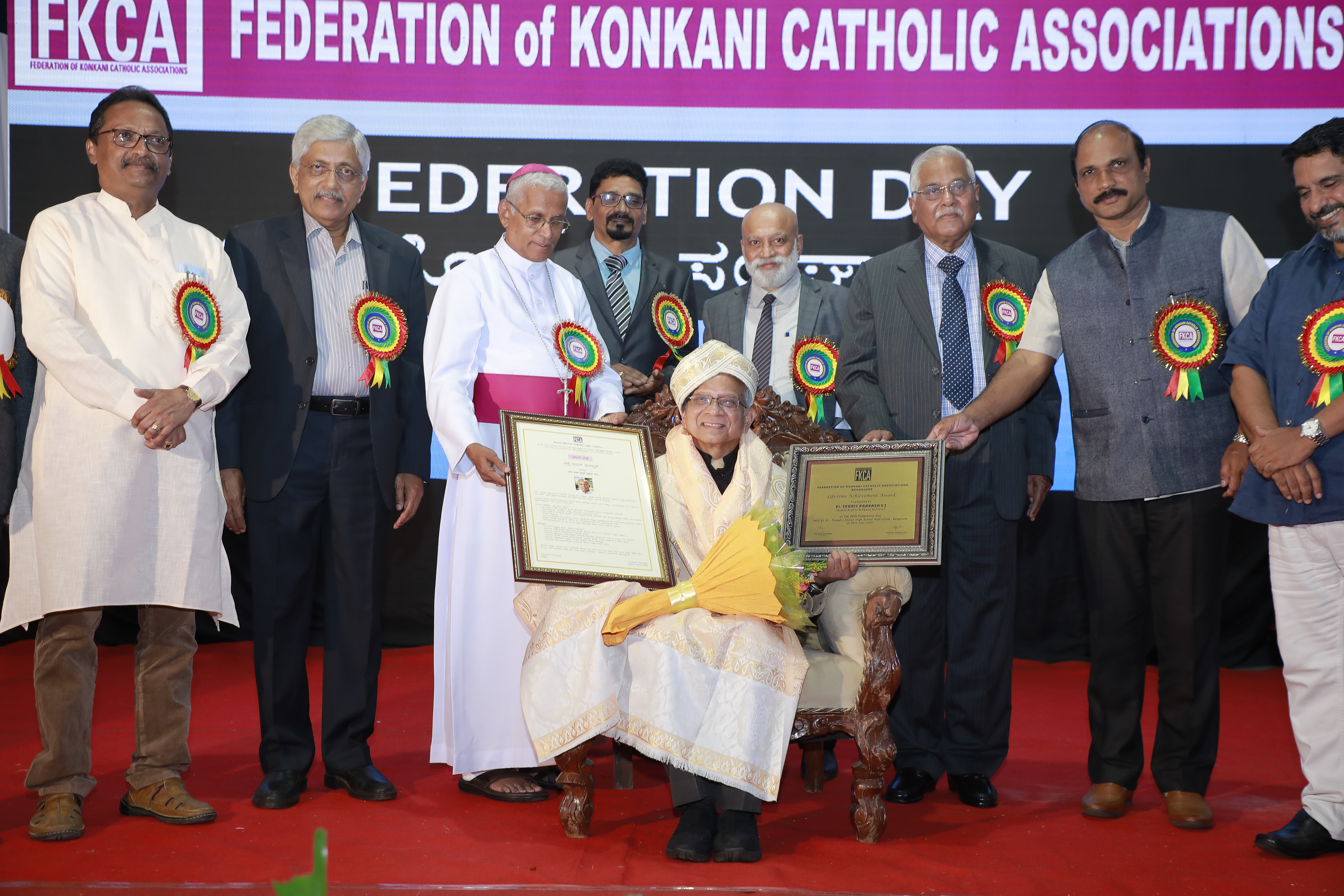
Fr. Prakash receiving the 'Lifetime Achievement Award' by FKCA in Bangalore on 5 June 2022.

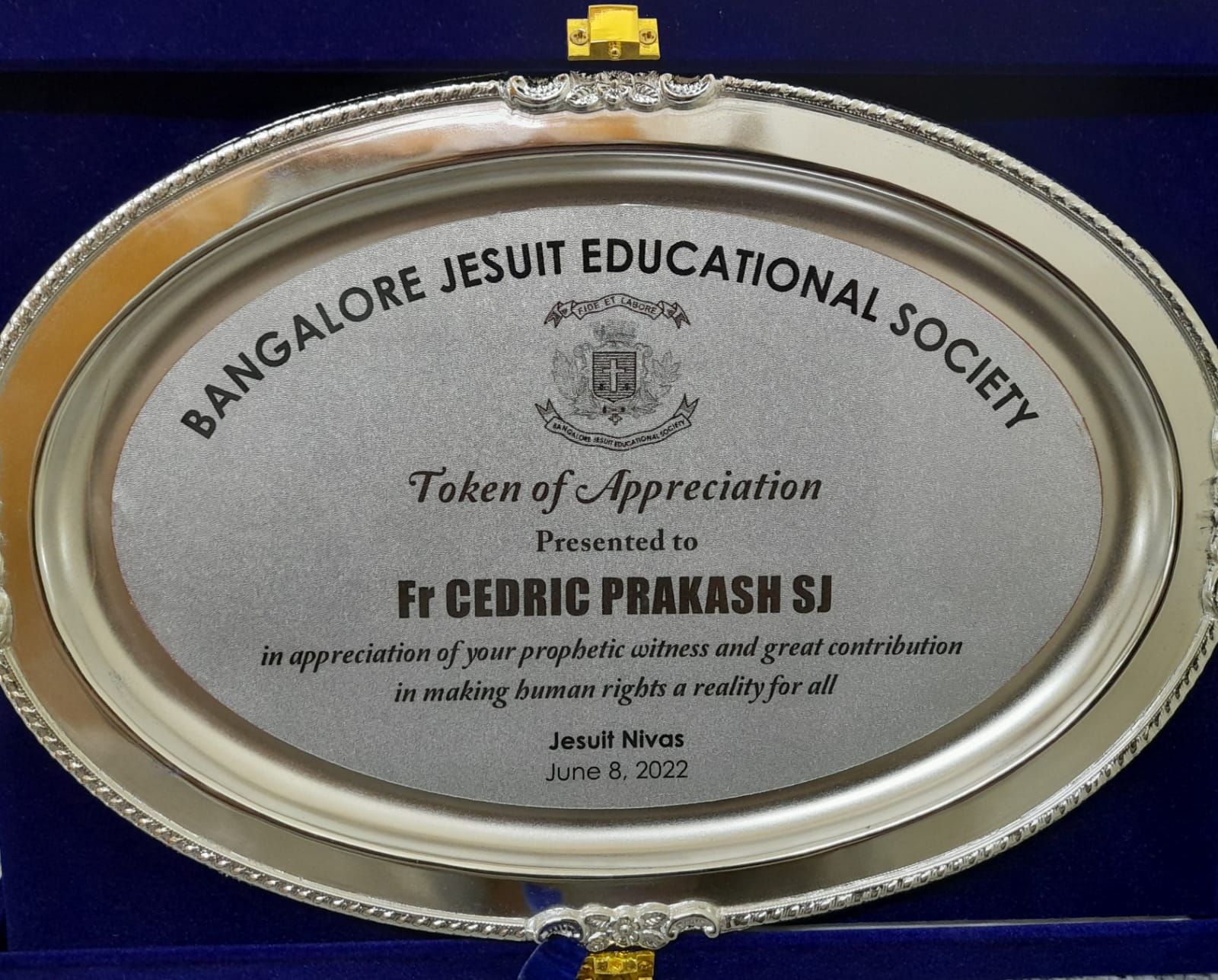
Felicitation memento presented to Fr. Prakash by the 'Bangalore Jesuit Educational Society' on 8 June 2022.
