= Kiowa Costonie =

Prophet Kiowa Costonie was born in 1903 on an Indian reservation in Salt Lake City, Utah. Abandoned by his parents as an infant, Costonie spent his adolescent years living from one foster home to another. After four name changes and several adoptions later, he settled with the name Kiowa Costonie, which he believed was his original name given by his birth mother. The prophet spent a great deal of his life traveling from state to state, investing in business ventures and uplifting those in the black community.

During the 1930s, Kiowa Costonie was noted as being one of the most active voices against racial inequality in Baltimore, Maryland. In 1933, he left his home in Harlem, New York City to pilot several dozen boycotts against local store owners who would not employ African Americans. Costonie massive boycott included: The A&P, ASCO, Tommy Tucker's five and dime store, Max Meyers' shoe store, and Howard Cleaners and Dryers. His famous "Buy Where You Can Work" campaign led to the successful hiring of nearly one hundred blacks in Northwest Baltimore.

Prophet Costonie also considered himself to be a "faith healer". He led thousands to believe that he had the ability to cure ailments with the touch of his hands and prayer. Costonie practiced his faith healing in Baltimore at several local churches before founding a number of religious institutions in many cities. He also published two books, "How To Win and Hold a Husband" and "Costonie's Book of Dreams". Kiowa Costonie led an adventurous, busy life helping those in need until his death in 1971.
