= St. Xavier's Social Service Society =

Coordinates: 23°2′14.75″N 72°33′59.29″E

- Established: 1976; 50 years ago
- Location(s): Navrangpura, Ahmedabad; Gujarat, India
- Director: Victor Moses
- Main organ: Perspective – Drashtikon
- Affiliations: Jesuit, Catholic
- Budget: US$1,000,000, mostly food aid
- Staff: 20
- Website: St. Xavier's Social Service Society

St. Xavier's Social Service Society (SXSSS), a Jesuit social work originating at St. Xavier's High School Loyola Hall, Ahmedabad, has since 1976 worked to improve the lot of the people in the slums of Ahmedabad city in the areas of education, health, environment, and community organization. Its efforts have also spread to the countryside and more widely.

== History ==
St. Xavier's Social Service Society (SXSSS) grew out of a 1960s outreach program of students and faculty at St. Xavier's High School Loyola Hall, Ahmedabad. Over the years three areas have come to the fore: education, organizing people's groups, and people's action to improve the quality of their lives.

In 1976, Fr. Erviti, founded St. Xavier's Social Service Society (SXSSS) beginning with rehabilitation work in Sankalitnagar. In 1983 it moved on to Mahajan-no-Vando and the Nagori Kabrasthan slum settlements. It also obtained its own premises apart from St. Xavier School. In 1986 Erviti died but other Jesuits carried on the leadership. The SXSSS Center for Orientation, Research, and Documentation (CORD) was founded in 1989.

The National Institute of Open Schooling (NIOS) is a programme of the Indian Ministry of Human Resource Development. In 1990 SXSSS became the first accredited institute in this programme in Gujarat, with English and Hindi as a medium of instruction. SXSSS also responds to emergency situations – cyclones, floods, droughts, earthquakes, and communal riots that have ravaged life in Gujarat.

By 1994 the Society was active in seven major slum pockets, and had increasing manpower and resources. Funds for its food for work program come from several foreign countries. Since SXSSS is not run by Hindi or Muslims, it is seen as speaking to racial issues from a neutral perspective. Also, it has Sikhs, Jains, Hindi, and Muslims on its staff. In 1995, the organization was named the first recipient of the Anubhai Chimanlal Nagarikta Puraskar for its sustained contribution to the city of Ahmedabad.

In December 2004, Jamat-e-Islam-e-Hind presented its Human Rights Award to St. Xavier's Social Service Society for unflinching service towards the cause of communal unity and human rights in the year 2002.

In 2008 the Communal Harmony Award was given to an SXSSS children's home monitor (balmitras) Mrs. Niruben Marwadi by the NRI Coalition, for saving Muslim families during the Gujarat Carnage in 2002.

== Bibliography ==
- Anderson, Mary B. (1999). Do No Harm: How Aid Can Support Peace – or War. London: Lynne Rienner. ISBN 1-55587-833-4. pp. 122–129.
- Bock, Joseph G (1995). The Harmony Project of the St. Xavier's Social Service Society, Ahmedabad, Gujarat India. Cambridge MA: CDA Collaborative Learning Projects.
- Gosling, David L. (2001). Religion and Ecology in India and Southeast Asia. London: Routledge. ISBN 978-0415240314. pp. 139,186.
- OOmmen, T.K. (2007). Post-Godhra Gujarat. New Delhi: Pearson Longman. Pp. 157-166.
- Tongeren, Paul van, et al (2005). "A Journey Towards Peace" in People Building Peace II: Successful Stories of Civil Society. European Centre for Conflict Prevention. ISBN 978-1-58826-358-2

== See also ==
- List of Jesuit sites
