= Dick Oosting =

Dutch human rights lawyer & activist (b.1946)

Dick Oosting (born June 1946) is a Dutch human rights lawyer and activist. He headed Amnesty International's EU Office and was the CEO of the European Council on Foreign Relations (ECFR). Oosting was Chair of the Board of the Martin Ennals Foundation.

== Work at Amnesty ==
In the mid-1970s he coordinated Amnesty International’s first worldwide campaign against torture (an activity highlighted in Amnesty's Nobel Peace Prize citation in 1977). He then served five years as Amnesty's Deputy Secretary General and returned to the Netherlands to head its Dutch national section. From 1999 he spent eight years in Brussels leading Amnesty's EU office.

== The International Center for Transitional Justice ==
Oosting managed the Europe programme of the International Center for Transitional Justice, managing programmes in the former Yugoslavia, Cyprus and Afghanistan. Oosting has been on high level human rights missions to Africa, Asia and the Middle East.

== The European Council on Foreign Relations ==
He joined the European Council on Foreign Relations in 2010 and has been its CEO until 2016. He is a now a member of the Council of ECFR.

== See also ==
- List of civil rights leaders
