= William Ryan (psychologist) =

American psychologist (1923–2002)

- Born: September 20, 1923
- Died: June 7, 2002 (aged 78); Boston, Massachusetts
- Occupation: Academic
- Known for: Idea of "Victim blaming"
- Title: Professor
- Spouse: Phyllis Milgroom (m. 1951)
- Children: 1; Elizabeth

Academic background
- Education: Boston University

Academic work
- Discipline: Psychology
- Sub-discipline: Sociology
- Institutions: Harvard Medical School; Boston College (1969-1998)
- Notable works: Distress in the city (1969) Blaming the victim (1971) Equality (1981)

William J. Ryan Jr. (September 20, 1923 – June 7, 2002) was a psychologist, author, and civil rights activist. He is best known for his exposure of the sociological phenomenon of blaming the victim, which he articulated in his 1971 book of the same name. Ryan's work is considered a major structuralist rebuttal to the Moynihan Report. The 1965 report had mainly attributed the high poverty rate among African Americans to a 'tangle of pathology' in Negro families, such as a preponderance of out-of-wedlock births, absent fathers, and single-mother households. Ryan rejected this explanation of supposed cultural deprivation for its confusion of cause and effect, a fallacy he termed victim blaming.

== Early life ==
Ryan was born in Everett, Massachusetts on September 20, 1923, into a Catholic family of Democrats, the only child of William J. Ryan and Marion C. Ryan (née Evans). He joined the U.S. Army Air Corps during World War II. He was a non-combatant, working as a cryptographer in the Caribbean, 'doing coding and decoding'. Upon leaving military service at age 25, he enrolled at Boston University. As an undergraduate, he grew interested in psychology and earned a degree in that field. He later obtained staff positions in the Boston Psychopathic Hospital, the South Shore Guidance Center, and the Mount Auburn Hospital.

In 1951, Ryan married Phyllis Milgroom (Phyllis M. Ryan), the daughter of Russian immigrants and a practicing Jew from a large Jewish family. A graduate of Boston's Northeastern University, she worked as a psychiatric social worker in the local state mental health system. During their marriage, Ryan converted to Judaism. According to his wife's aunt, Anne A. Jackson, Ryan learned Hebrew, spoke Yiddish, and studied Jewish scholarship. Jackson recalled a special Haggadah he wrote for the Passover service that was used by all synagogue members: '[H]e mentioned every kind of worthwhile consideration. I think he even had gays in there. And, of course, he had the Blacks and the inequalities that we've had in this country.'

== Early career ==
Ryan undertook his graduate work at Boston University, where he obtained a Ph.D. in 1958 in clinical psychology. However, he found himself increasingly interested in social and community psychology as he became engaged by societal issues and matters of equality. Starting in the late 1950s, he joined his wife in a long commitment to the civil rights movement. They were activists in the Boston area for fair housing and educational equity. They also advocated for welfare rights and prison reform. In 1973, he helped organize the Citizen Observer program in Walpole State Prison.

== Blaming the victim ==
By 1965, Ryan was serving as a faculty member in the Harvard Medical School Laboratory of Community Psychiatry. In the March of that year, Daniel Patrick Moynihan's report, The Negro Family: The Case for National Action was published. In it Moynihan wrote: 'most Negro youth are in danger of being caught up in the tangle of pathology that affects their world, and probably a majority are so entrapped.' Also Moynihan claimed: 'At the heart of the deterioration of the fabric of Negro society is the deterioration of the Negro family. Ryan voiced his opposition to the Report in many ways. In November in an article in The Nation, he wrote that the Moynihan Report 'seduces the reader into believing that it is not racism and discrimination but the weaknesses and defects of the Negro himself that account for the present status of inequality between Negro and white.' Ryan subsequently targeted other studies such as the 1966 Coleman Report, which he regarded as further instances of attributing societal inequality to character flaws.

In 1969, Ryan obtained a post as a lecturer in Boston College, where he became the Professor of Psychology for 25 years at its Chestnut Hill Campus in Newton. Also in that year, and with the help of close collaborator George Albee, the-then President of the American Psychological Association, Distress in the City, was published, an anthology of essays which Ryan edited. He contributed the final three essays to the anthology, the last of which is entitled Fretting About the Poor. His essay comprises two sections, Blaming the Victim and Money and Power. In the former section Ryan described blaming the victim as 'an intellectual process whereby a social problem is analyzed in such a way that the causation is found to be in the qualities and characteristics of the victim rather than in any deficiencies or structural defects in his environment.' He continued:

'In addition, it is usually found that these characteristics are not inherent or genetic but are, rather, socially determined. They are stigmas of solcial origin and are therefore no fault of the victim himself. He is to be pitied, not censured, but nevertheless his problems are to be defined as rooted basically in his own characteristics. ... "Blaming the victim" is differentiated from old-fahioned conservative ideological formulations, such as Social Darwinism, racial inferiority, and quasi-Calvinist notions of the prospering elect. It is a liberal ideology.'

In 1971, Ryan had published his book Blaming the Victim, for which he became famous. In it he proposed that the ideology comprises four stages:

'First, identify a social problem. Second, study those affected by the problem and discover in what ways they are different from the rest of us as a consequence of deprivation and injustice. Third, define the differences as the cause of the social problem itself. Finally, of course, assign a government bureaucrat to invent a humanitarian action program to correct the differences.'

Ryan illustrated the ideology of blaming the victim by citing two widely-separated hypothetical cases, one which related to the private sector and the other which related to the public sector.

The first case involved a coloring book that the health department of a major American city 'which labels as neglectful and thoughtless the mother who does not keep her infant under constant surveillance to keep it from eating paint chips.' He continued: 'no one would argue against the idea that it is important to spread knowledge about the danger of eating paint in order that parents might act to forestall their children from doing so. But to campaign against lead paint only in these terms is destructive and misleading and, in a sense, an effective way to support and agrees with slum landlords - who define the problem of lead poisoning in precisely these terms.'

The second case involved the famous legend of Dr John Snow and the legend of the Broad Street pump:

‘If a cholera epidemic is raging in the town, only a lunatic would study the victims to find out what distinguishes them from their healthy neighbors – to discover their personal, hypothetical, cholera-catching characteristics. The object of such a study would be to find out in what way the victims differ from the non-victims in the ways they interact with their environment. What kind of food have they eaten, and where do they get it? Where does their water and milk come from? What is the state of their housing and plumbing? Where do they spend their time? Doing what? With whom?
A famous public health legend – the story of the Broad Street pump – illustrates this approach precisely. The physician who conducted the investigation was a good physician; he was anxious to do and to help, but he was also a good social analyst. He discovered that a greatly disproportionate number of cholera victims got their water from the pump on Broad Street. He concluded that there was something about the pump (not those who drank the water) that was causing the disease. Now, the next part of the story is very crucial.
What did he do? He did not apply for a research grant to study the characteristics of the pump and its water in order to develop a theory of the etiology of cholera. Nor did he publish a pamphlet urging people not to get their water from this pump. He ripped the handle off the pump. That particular cholera epidemic subsided.’

Ryan's book was not received uncritically. For example, Klass (1995) was very critical of it. Nevertheless, his book became 'one of the all-time academic best sellers', and was followed in 1976 with a revised and updated edition.

== Later career ==
In 1981, Ryan published his final book, Equality, which explored notions of individualism, fair play and equal opportunity, and analyzed how inequality comes about. He defined two schools of thought in the debate about equality and inequality. One school of thought was Fair Play: a person's right to pursue happiness with minimal interference. Ryan argued that the proponents of this school believed in equality of opportunity, and felt that inequality arises in society because of differences in the internal characteristics of individuals. The other school of thought was Fair Share: a person's right to 'a reasonable share of society's resources sufficient to sustain life at a decent standard of humanity.' Ryan asserted that the proponents of this school (of which he was one) believed that inequality is a preexisting state which stems primarily from external factors. He wrote: 'Equality of opportunity is, inevitably, a pathway to inequality, and Fair Play is not a rule for achieving equality, but rather an excuse for inequality.' He dedicated the book to his wife Phyllis and thanked their daughter Elizabeth in the Acknowledgments for having provided him with 'a brilliant analysis of early draft material' that helped him 'immeasurably in rethinking and reorganizing [his] work'.

In 1993, shortly before Ryan retired, the American Psychological Association presented him with its Society for Community Research and Action Award for his distinguished contributions to theory and research in community psychology. However, after he had retired Ryan expressed his misgiving about psychology. He opined that it 'has become the science of understanding internal individual differences, which leads to kinds of ideological distortions that support inequality.' And he expressed his misgiving about his phrase 'Blaming the victim'. He opined: 'maybe it was an unfortunate phrase.'

On June 7, 2002, Ryan died in a Boston hospital. He was 78.

== Publications ==
=== Articles ===
- With Saul Cooper and Bellenden R. Hutcheson. Ryan, William (1959). "Classroom screening for emotional disturbance". American Psychologist. 14: 341.
- Ryan, William (1965b). "The new genteel racism". The Crisis. 72 (10): 623–631, 644.
- —— (1966). "Citizens in mental health--what are they for?". Mental Hygiene. 50 (4): 597–600. An extract entitled "Citizen" and Mental Health' is available at Rehabilitation Record. 1967. 8 (March–April): 6. Accessed 8 December 2024.
- Ryan, William; et al. (1967). "Feedback from our readers". Trans-action. 4 (3): 62–64. doi:10.1007/BF03180043.
- Ryan, William (1969). "Community care in historical perspective: Implications for mental health services and professionals". Canada's Mental Health. Supplement (60): March–April.
- —— (1971b). "Blaming the victim: The folklore of cultural deprivation". This Magazine is About Schools. 5 (Spring) (2): 97–117. (See Connexions. Accessed 8 December 2024.)
- —— (1971c). "Emotional disorder as a social problem: Implications for mental health programs". American Journal of Orthopsychiatry. 41 (4): 638–645. doi:10.1111/j.1939-0025.1971.tb03224.x. PMID 5558616. Reprinted in Denner, Bruce; Price, Richard H., eds. (1973). Community Mental Health Social Action and Inaction. New York: Holt, Rinehart and Windton. pp. 22–30. ISBN 0-03-085651-5.
- —— (1971d). "Unsocialized medicine". Contemporary Psychology. XVI (4): 256–258. doi:10.1037/014050.
- —— (1994). "Many cooks, brave men, apples, and oranges: How people think about equality". American Journal of Community Psychology. 22 (1): 25–35. doi:10.1007/BF02506815.

=== Chapters ===
- Ryan, William (1967). "Preventive Services in the Social Context: Power, Pathology, and Prevention". In Bloom, Bernard L.; Buck, Dorothy P. (eds.). Preventive Services in Mental Health Programs: Proceedings of the Mental Health Institute at Salt Lake City, Utah, May 31- June 2, 1967. Boulder, Colorado: Western Interstate Commission for Higher Education.
- —— (1969b). "A New Mental Health Agenda". In Ryan, William (ed.). Distress in the City: Essays on the Design and Administration of Urban Mental Health Services. Cleveland, Ohio: The Press of Case Western Reserve University. ISBN 978-0829501490.
- —— (1969c). "Distress in the City: A Summary Report of the Boston Mental Health Survey". In Ryan, William (ed.). Distress in the City: Essays on the Design and Administration of Urban Mental Health Services. Cleveland, Ohio: The Press of Case Western Reserve University. ISBN 978-0829501490.
- —— (1971e). "The Social Welfare Client: Blaming the Victim". In Kalz, A. J. (ed.). The Social Welfare Forum 1971 Official Proceedings, 98th Annual Forum, National Conference on Social Welfare, Dallas, Texas, May 16-May 21, 1971. New York: Columbia University Press.

=== Monographs ===
- Ryan, William; Morris, Laura B. (1967). Child welfare problems and potentials: A study of intake of child welfare agencies in metropolitan Boston. Monograph III. Boston, Massachusetts: Massachusetts Committee on Children and Youth.
- With Ali Banuazizi. Ryan, William (1972). Mental health planning in metropolitan areas. Community Psychology Monograph No. 1. Boston: Boston College.
- With Allan Sloan, Mania Seferi and Elaine Werby. Ryan, William (1974). All in together: An evaluation of mixed-income multi-family housing. Boston: Massachusetts Housing Finance Agency.

=== Book ===
- Ryan, William (1971a). Blaming the Victim. New York: Pantheon. ISBN 978-0855140106.
