= Sevasi =

- town
- Location in Gujarat, India Sevasi (India)
- Coordinates: 22°18′00″N 73°12′01″E
- Country: India
- State: Gujarat

Area
  - Total: 48.95 km^{2} (18.90 sq mi)

Languages
  - Official: Gujarati, Hindi
- Time zone: UTC+5:30 (IST)
- Vehicle registration: GJ
- Website: gujaratindia.com

Sevasi is a town in Vadodara.

== Geography ==
Sevasi is located in the Vadodara district of the Indian state of Gujarat. It lies on the western outskirts of Vadodara city and is part of the Vadodara Metropolitan Region. The village has experienced gradual urban development due to its proximity to major residential, educational, and commercial areas.
