= Phyllis M. Ryan =

Civil rights activist

Phyllis Milgroom Ryan (July 2, 1927 - May 5, 1998) was a civil rights activist from Brookline, Massachusetts.She was active from the late 1950s to the early 1980s about social justice causes which, in addition to civil rights, included housing discrimination, racial imbalance and desegregation in local schools, prison reform, welfare reform, interfaith relations and disability rights, with an emphasis on the Boston area. Hogan (2020) documented: "The nature of Ryan’s work frequently relegated her to a voluntary role of background character in the many political narratives she shaped, promoting movements and voices without promoting herself, creating access and elevating the voices of the marginalized without taking personal advantage."

== Personal life ==
Phyllis Milgroom Ryan was born on July 2, 1927, in Chelsea, Massachusetts, the youngest of two daughters, to Arthur and Elizabeth Milgroom, who were Russian immigrants. She grew up in Brookline, Massachusetts and attended the Brookline Public Schools, graduating from Brookline High School. She enrolled in Northeastern University in Boston, where she found her start in political activism with the organization, Students for Henry Wallace. She graduated in 1950 with a degree in English, after which she worked as a psychiatric social worker in the local state mental health system.

In 1951, Ryan married William Ryan (psychologist), with whom she often collaborated to organize protests. In 1954 the couple had their only child, Elizabeth Ryan Yuengert. Phyllis was successful in the media relations positions she held with various political organizations. She helped those organizations with the planning and coordination of their public demonstrations. She suffered from ill-health for a large part of her adult life. She recalled to author Fred Powledge that, before moving with her husband from Boston to New Haven in Connecticut in 1966, she had been confined to bed for a period of time. She contracted multiple sclerosis in the late 1970s. And she was confined to her bed for twenty years, as a consequence of which she needed to have nurses most of the time. Nevertheless, Ryan remained politically active throughout her life.

In her last campaign, Ryan convinced the city of Newton, Massachusetts to make its public lake (possibly Crystal Lake) wheelchair accessible. She died on May 5, 1998, from complications of her medical condition.

== Social activism ==
=== Fair housing (1962) ===
The mission of the Fair Housing Federation of Greater Boston was to eliminate housing discrimination in Boston's predominantly white suburbs. Ryan led the campaign in Brookline, Massachusetts, where she urged other Brookline residents to sign a Good Neighbor statement as a declaration that race would not factor into the decision to sell one's house. 80% of the residents who signed the statement also added stickers to the doors of their homes.

=== Boston Public School stayout (1963) ===
A series of boycotts against the Boston Public Schools, called Stayout for Freedom, were organized starting in 1963 to protest segregation of the Boston Public School System. The Stayouts began as a way to demonstrate how empty certain public schools in Boston would be if all of the non-white students did not show up. Instead of going to school, the students went to Freedom Schools, where they learned about history of blacks in America, civics, and civil disobedience as protest. Phyllis Ryan, her husband William, and other fair housing activists in the suburbs of Boston organized their own Stayout, because housing practices played a major role in the segregation of schools. Instead of non-white students in Boston boycotting their schools, students from Boston's predominantly white suburban schools followed the example of earlier Stayouts and were bussed into Roxbury to participate in Freedom Schools. Phyllis oversaw the public relations of the event and managed to get the event on the front page of major Boston newspapers.

=== Coalition of Concerned Citizens (1967-1969) ===
Ryan and her husband moved to New Haven after he had obtained two posts in the Yale School of Medicine and the newly-opened Connecticut Mental Health Center. In 1967, two events occurred in New Haven which prompted the creation of a local organization, the Coalition of Concerned Citizens, in which Ryan and her husband became early organizers and spokesmen (sic), while she became its acting steering committee chairman (sic). First, on October 26, Fred Harris, the president of the Hill Parents Association (HPA), was arrested on a narcotics charge. Second, on November 7, Democrat Richard C. Lee was elected as the mayor of the city.

The first event was catalytic. Ryan recalled “Word of this spread like wildfire around the black community, especially word of the manner of his arrest: the Gestapo-like qualities of the policemen coming in and so forth.” She recounted that Mrs. Harris had been forced to dress while policemen were in the room. Furthermore: “The quality of this got all over town, quickly, and by nightfall what we had planned as a small, sort of figure-out-what-the-problem-is meeting had turned into a large group, a group of some 50 people.” Ryan concluded: “Their conviction that there was police harassment in this city, and that Lee was a bad guy, and that he wasn’t doing anything about the harassment, but was in fact allowing the police to run rampant, is supported by the fact that 3,000 bucks was raised that night. And that’s a serious conviction.”

By the summer of 1969, Ryan and her husband had endured a succession of negative experiences in New Haven which included them being arrested for picketing the home of a local housing official. Consequently, they decided to leave New Haven and to return to Boston, where he took up a new post in Boston College.

=== Prison reform (1972) ===
Ryan, as part of the Ad Hoc Committee on Prison Reform, worked to improve conditions of prisons, with efforts particularly focused on Walpole State Prison in Walpole, Massachusetts. Ryan and the Committee started a civilian observation program that brought civilians into the prisons to witness conditions first-hand. She also worked closely with inmates to advocate and help them advocate for their rights, especially when it came to prison-guard brutality.

=== Welfare reform (1972) ===
In 1972, after a welfare reform bill passed the U.S. House of Representatives, the Senate Finance Committee amended the bill, adding a clause that would require welfare recipients to work on Federal projects in order to continue receiving Federal Aid. Ryan, a member of the Committee Against Bogus Welfare Reform, spoke out against the amended bill for requiring work, with no guaranteed minimum wage, from those already in need. She also argued that single mothers on this welfare plan would have to find affordable daycare for their children. The amendment ended up being rescinded from the bill.

=== "Dump the Duke" campaign (1976) ===
In 1976, Ryan and her husband with Hubie Jones, another social activist, created the Should Dukakis Be Governor? Committee to organize the Dump the Duke movement. The committee's goal was to raise awareness of and opposition to Massachusetts Governor Michael Dukakis's cuts to welfare funding in 1975. Their campaign sought to expose what they saw as contradictions between Dukakis's campaign promises and his actions in office in an effort to undermine his political authority and re-election.

== Affiliations to organizations ==
- Ad Hoc Committee on Prison Reform
- Boston Congress of Racial Equality (CORE)
- Committee Against Bogus Welfare Reform
- Coalition Against Political Extremism (CAPE)
- Coalition of Concerned Citizens
- Fair Housing Federation of Greater Boston
- Massachusetts Freedom Movement
- Southern Christian Leadership Conference (SCLC)

== Archives ==
- Civil Rights Movement Archive.
- The Phyllis M. Ryan papers at the University Libraries of Northeastern University.
