= 2002 in the United States =

- Decades: 1980s; 1990s; 2000s; 2010s; 2020s
- See also: History of the United States (1991–2016); Timeline of United States history (1990–2009); List of years in the United States

Events from the year 2002 in the United States.

== Incumbents ==
=== Federal government ===
- President: George W. Bush (R-Texas)
- Vice President: Dick Cheney (R-Wyoming)
- Chief Justice: William Rehnquist (Virginia)
- Speaker of the House of Representatives: Dennis Hastert (R-Illinois)
- Senate Majority Leader: Tom Daschle (D-South Dakota)
- Congress: 107th

==== State governments ====
Governors and lieutenant governors

=== Governors ===
- Governor of Alabama: Don Siegelman (Democratic)
- Governor of Alaska: Tony Knowles (Democratic) (until December 2), Frank Murkowski (Republican) (starting December 2)
- Governor of Arizona: Jane Dee Hull (Republican)
- Governor of Arkansas: Mike Huckabee (Republican)
- Governor of California: Gray Davis (Democratic)
- Governor of Colorado: Bill Owens (Republican)
- Governor of Connecticut: John G. Rowland (Republican)
- Governor of Delaware: Ruth Ann Minner (Democratic)
- Governor of Florida: Jeb Bush (Republican)
- Governor of Georgia: Roy Barnes (Democratic)
- Governor of Hawaii: Ben Cayetano (Democratic) (until December 2), Linda Lingle (Republican) (starting December 2)
- Governor of Idaho: Dirk Kempthorne (Republican)
- Governor of Illinois: George Ryan (Republican)
- Governor of Indiana: Frank O'Bannon (Democratic)
- Governor of Iowa: Tom Vilsack (Democratic)
- Governor of Kansas: Bill Graves (Republican)
- Governor of Kentucky: Paul E. Patton (Democratic)
- Governor of Louisiana: Murphy J. Foster, Jr. (Republican)
- Governor of Maine: Angus King (Independent)
- Governor of Maryland: Parris N. Glendening (Democratic)
- Governor of Massachusetts: Jane Swift (Republican)
- Governor of Michigan: John Engler (Republican)
- Governor of Minnesota: Jesse Ventura (Independence)
- Governor of Mississippi: Ronnie Musgrove (Democratic)
- Governor of Missouri: Bob Holden (Democratic)
- Governor of Montana: Judy Martz (Republican)
- Governor of Nebraska: Mike Johanns (Republican)
- Governor of Nevada: Kenny Guinn (Republican)
- Governor of New Hampshire: Jeanne Shaheen (Democratic)
- Governor of New Jersey:
  - until January 8: Donald DiFrancesco (Republican)
  - January 8: John Farmer, Jr. (Republican)
  - January 8–12: John O. Bennett (Republican)
  - January 12–15: Richard Codey (Democratic)
  - starting January 15: Jim McGreevey (Democratic)
- Governor of New Mexico: Gary Johnson (Republican)
- Governor of New York: George Pataki (Republican)
- Governor of North Carolina: Mike Easley (Democratic)
- Governor of North Dakota: John Hoeven (Republican)
- Governor of Ohio: Bob Taft (Republican)
- Governor of Oklahoma: Frank Keating (Republican)
- Governor of Oregon: John Kitzhaber (Democratic)
- Governor of Pennsylvania: Mark S. Schweiker (Republican)
- Governor of Rhode Island: Lincoln C. Almond (Republican)
- Governor of South Carolina: Jim Hodges (Democratic)
- Governor of South Dakota: William J. Janklow (Republican)
- Governor of Tennessee: Don Sundquist (Republican)
- Governor of Texas: Rick Perry (Republican)
- Governor of Utah: Mike Leavitt (Republican)
- Governor of Vermont: Howard Dean (Democratic)
- Governor of Virginia: Jim Gilmore (Republican) (until January 12), Mark Warner (Democratic) (starting January 12)
- Governor of Washington: Gary Locke (Democratic)
- Governor of West Virginia: Bob Wise (Democratic)
- Governor of Wisconsin: Scott McCallum (Republican)
- Governor of Wyoming: Jim Geringer (Republican)

=== Lieutenant governors ===
- Lieutenant Governor of Alabama: Steve Windom (Republican)
- Lieutenant Governor of Alaska: Fran Ulmer (Democratic) (until December 2), Loren Leman (Republican) (starting December 2)
- Lieutenant Governor of Arkansas: Winthrop Paul Rockefeller (Republican)
- Lieutenant Governor of California: Cruz Bustamante (Democratic)
- Lieutenant Governor of Colorado: Joe Rogers (Republican)
- Lieutenant Governor of Connecticut: Jodi Rell (Republican)
- Lieutenant Governor of Delaware: John Carney (Democratic)
- Lieutenant Governor of Florida: Frank Brogan (Republican)
- Lieutenant Governor of Georgia: Mark Taylor (Democratic)
- Lieutenant Governor of Hawaii:
  - until December 2: Mazie Hirono (Democratic)
  - December 2–4: vacant
  - starting December 4: Duke Aiona (Republican)
- Lieutenant Governor of Idaho: Jack Riggs (Republican)
- Lieutenant Governor of Illinois: Corinne Wood (Republican)
- Lieutenant Governor of Indiana: Joe E. Kernan (Democratic)
- Lieutenant Governor of Iowa: Sally Pederson (Democratic)
- Lieutenant Governor of Kansas: Gary Sherrer (Republican)
- Lieutenant Governor of Kentucky: Steve Henry (Democratic)
- Lieutenant Governor of Louisiana: Kathleen Blanco (Democratic)
- Lieutenant Governor of Maryland: Kathleen Kennedy Townsend (Democratic)
- Lieutenant Governor of Massachusetts: Jane Swift (Republican)
- Lieutenant Governor of Michigan: Dick Posthumus (Republican)
- Lieutenant Governor of Minnesota: Mae Schunk (Independence)
- Lieutenant Governor of Mississippi: Amy Tuck (Democratic)/(Republican)
- Lieutenant Governor of Missouri: Joe Maxwell (Democratic)
- Lieutenant Governor of Montana: Karl Ohs (Republican)
- Lieutenant Governor of Nebraska: Dave Heineman (Republican)
- Lieutenant Governor of Nevada: Lorraine Hunt (Republican)
- Lieutenant Governor of New Mexico: Walter Dwight Bradley (Republican)
- Lieutenant Governor of New York: Mary Donohue (Republican)
- Lieutenant Governor of North Carolina: Bev Perdue (Democratic)
- Lieutenant Governor of North Dakota: Jack Dalrymple (Republican)
- Lieutenant Governor of Ohio: Maureen O'Connor (Republican) (until December 31), vacant (starting December 31)
- Lieutenant Governor of Oklahoma: Mary Fallin (Republican)
- Lieutenant Governor of Pennsylvania: Robert Jubelirer (Republican)
- Lieutenant Governor of Rhode Island: Charles J. Fogarty (Democratic)
- Lieutenant Governor of South Carolina: Bob Peeler (Republican)
- Lieutenant Governor of South Dakota: Carole Hillard (Republican)
- Lieutenant Governor of Tennessee: John S. Wilder (Democratic)
- Lieutenant Governor of Texas: Bill Ratliff (Republican)
- Lieutenant Governor of Utah: Olene S. Walker (Republican)
- Lieutenant Governor of Vermont: Doug Racine (Democratic)
- Lieutenant Governor of Virginia: John H. Hager (Republican) (until January 12), Tim Kaine (Democratic) (starting January 12)
- Lieutenant Governor of Washington: Brad Owen (Democratic)
- Lieutenant Governor of Wisconsin: Margaret A. Farrow (Republican)

== Events ==
=== January ===
January 8: President George W. Bush signs the No Child Left Behind Act into law

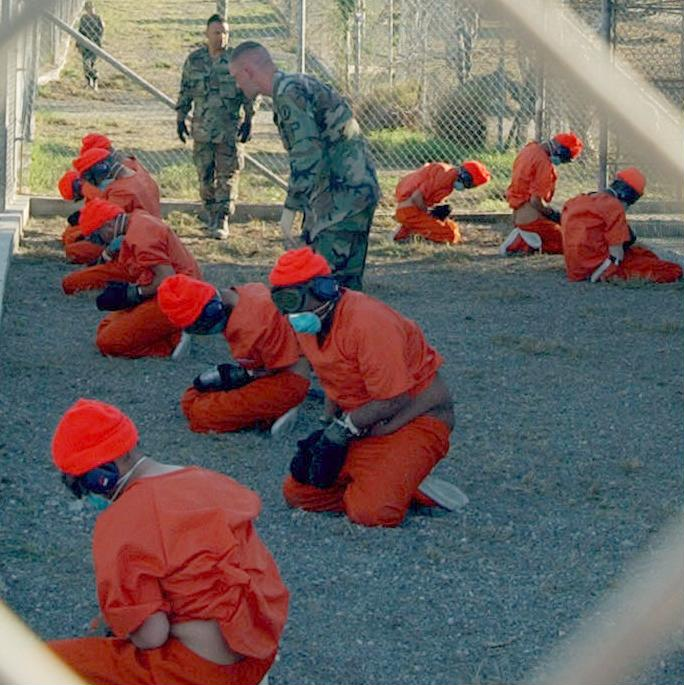
January 11: Camp X-Ray (Guantanamo)

- January 5 – Charles Bishop, a 15-year-old student pilot, crashes a light aircraft into a building in Tampa, Florida, evoking fear of a copycat 9/11 terrorist attack.
- January 6 – The Boston Globe publishes a story detailing the Catholic Archdiocese of Boston sex abuse scandal.
- January 8 – The No Child Left Behind Act is signed into law by U.S. President George W. Bush.
- January 9 – The United States Department of Justice announces it will pursue a criminal investigation of Enron.
- January 11 – The first detainees arrive at Camp X-Ray (Guantanamo).
- January 13 – President Bush chokes on a pretzel and faints briefly.
- January 14 – The asylum case of Adelaide Abankwah is heard in New York.
- January 16
  - The United Nations Security Council unanimously establishes an arms embargo and the freezing of assets of Osama bin Laden, al-Qaeda and the remaining members of the Taliban.
  - A student shoots six at the Appalachian School of Law in Grundy, Virginia, killing 3.
- January 18 – A Canadian Pacific Railway train carrying anhydrous ammonia derails outside of Minot, North Dakota, killing one.
- January 20 – The World Wrestling Federation holds its Royal Rumble pay-per-view event from the Philips Arena in Atlanta, Georgia.
- January 21 – Cyberchase premieres on PBS Kids.
- January 23 – The Wall Street Journal reporter Daniel Pearl is kidnapped in Pakistan, accused of being a CIA agent by his captors.
- January 29 – In his State of the Union Address, President Bush describes North Korea, Iran and Iraq as an "axis of evil".
- January 31 – U.S. special forces are deployed in the Philippines in Operation Enduring Freedom – Philippines, part of the war on terror.

=== February ===
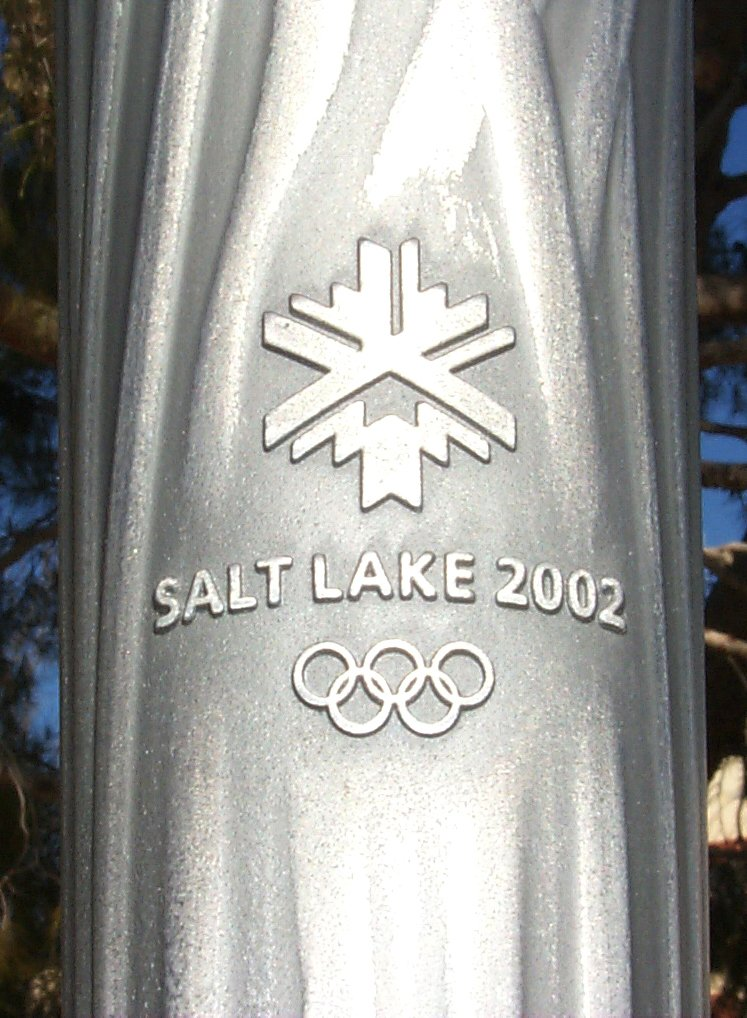
February 8 – February 24: The Winter Olympics are held in Salt Lake City

- February 1 – Kidnapped reporter Daniel Pearl of The Wall Street Journal is murdered in Karachi, Pakistan.
- February 3 – Super Bowl XXXVI: The New England Patriots beat the St. Louis Rams 20–17 at the Louisiana Superdome in New Orleans to win their first Super Bowl title.
- February 8–24 – The Winter Olympics are held in Salt Lake City, Utah. The United States wins 10 gold, 13 silver and 11 bronze medals.
- February 12 – The U.S. Secretary of Energy makes the decision that Yucca Mountain is suitable to be the United States' nuclear repository.
- February 13 – Queen Elizabeth II gives former New York City mayor Rudolph Giuliani an honorary knighthood.
- February 15 — 23-year-old Janet Danahey, sets fire to the Campus Walk Apartments building in Greensboro, North Carolina, as a prank against her ex-boyfriend. The fire would kill 4 and injury 6 of his neighbors. She is later sentenced to life imprisonment without parole.
- February 17 – The World Wrestling Federation holds its No Way Out pay-per-view event from the Bradley Center in Milwaukee, Wisconsin.
- February 19 – NASA's Mars Odyssey space probe begins to map the surface of Mars using its thermal emission imaging system.

=== March ===
- March 1
  - STS-109: Space Shuttle Columbia flies the Hubble Space Telescope service mission, its last before the disastrous STS-107.
  - U.S. invasion of Afghanistan: In eastern Afghanistan, Operation Anaconda begins.
- March 12 – In Houston, Texas, Andrea Yates is found guilty of drowning her five children on June 20, 2001. She is later sentenced to life in prison.
- March 14
  - SpaceX is founded by Elon Musk in El Segundo, California.
  - 125 vehicles are involved in a massive pile up on Interstate 75 in Ringgold, Georgia.
- March 15 – Ice Age is released in theaters.
- March 19 – US war in Afghanistan: Operation Anaconda ends (started on March 1) after killing 500 Taliban and al Qaeda fighters, with 11 allied troop fatalities.
- March 21 – In Pakistan, Ahmed Omar Saeed Sheikh and three others are charged with the kidnapping and killing of The Wall Street Journal reporter Daniel Pearl.
- March 24 – The 74th Academy Awards, hosted by Whoopi Goldberg, are held at Kodak Theatre in Hollywood, with Ron Howard's A Beautiful Mind winning four awards, including Best Picture and Best Director. The film ties with Peter Jackson's The Lord of the Rings: The Fellowship of the Ring in award wins, while the latter leads the nominations with 13. The telecast garners over 41.8 million viewers.
- March – Layalina Productions, Inc. non-profit public diplomacy initiative is inaugurated.

=== April ===
- April 1 – Maryland defeats Indiana 64–52 to win the NCAA Men's Basketball Championship at the Georgia Dome in Atlanta, Georgia.
- April 17 – Four Canadian infantrymen are killed in Afghanistan by friendly fire from two US F-16s.
- April 19 – The Senate defeats President Bush's plan to authorize oil exploration in the Arctic National Wildlife Refuge.
- April 21 – The World Wrestling Federation holds its Backlash pay-per-view event from the Kemper Arena in Kansas City, Missouri.
- April 27 – The Laughlin, Nevada River Run Riot kills three.

=== May ===
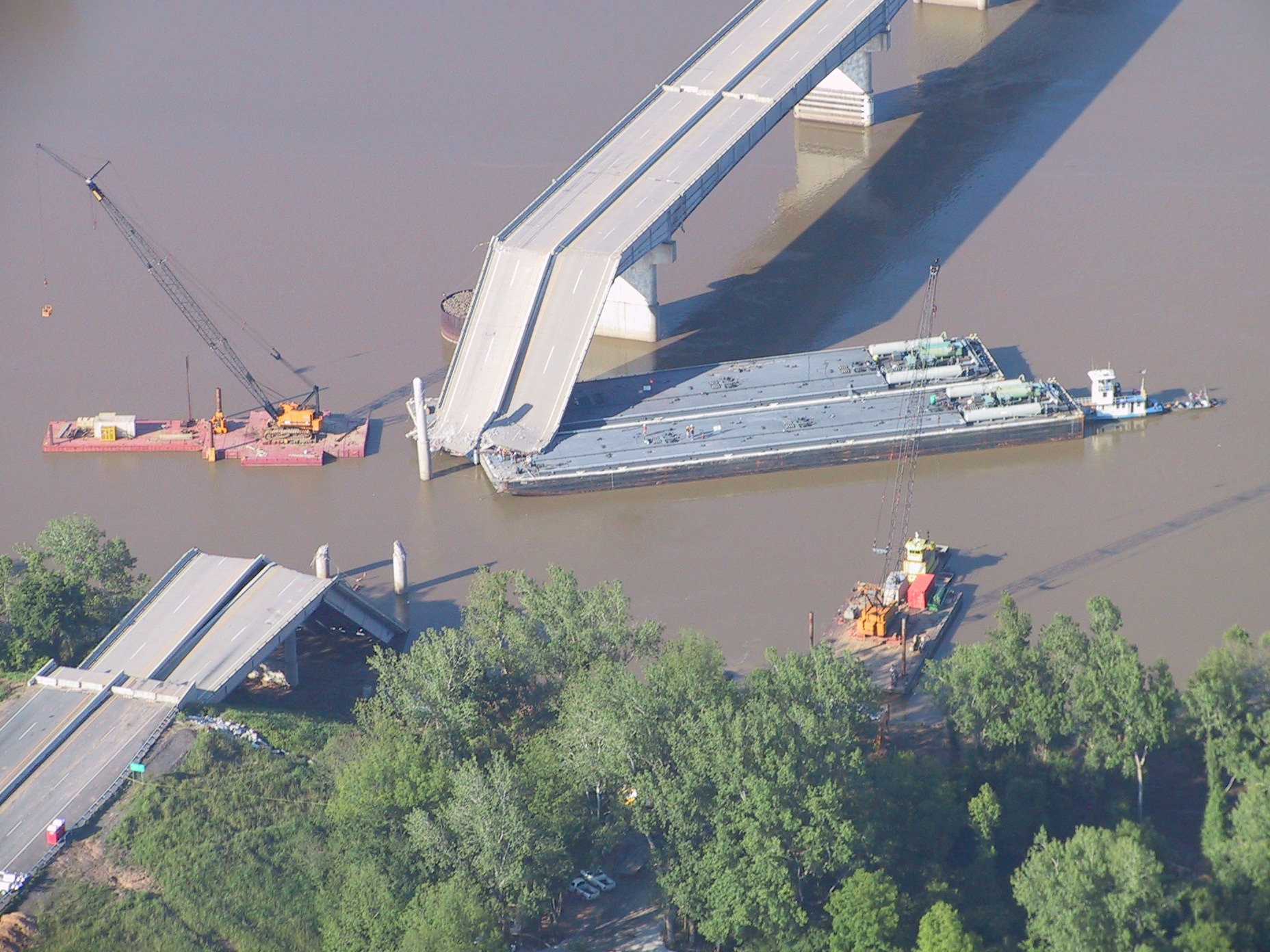
May 26: I-40 bridge disaster

- May 1 – Nicktoons TV (renamed Nicktoons in 2003, then in 2009) launches in the United States.
- May 3 – Spider-Man is released in theaters as the first film in the Spider-Man trilogy.
- May 10 – FBI agent Robert Hanssen is sentenced to life imprisonment without the possibility of parole for selling American secrets to Moscow for $1.4 million in cash and diamonds.
- May 12 – Former U.S. President Jimmy Carter arrives in Cuba for a five-day visit with Fidel Castro, becoming the first U.S. president, in or out of office, to visit the island since Castro's 1959 revolution.
- May 16 – Star Wars: Episode II – Attack of the Clones is released in theaters.
- May 19 – World Wrestling Entertainment holds its Judgment Day pay-per-view event from the Gaylord Entertainment Center in Nashville, Tennessee.
- May 21 – The State Department releases a report naming seven state sponsors of terrorism: Iran, Iraq, Cuba, Libya, North Korea, Sudan and Syria.
- May 22
  - 16th Street Baptist Church bombing: A jury in Birmingham, Alabama convicts Ku Klux Klan member Bobby Frank Cherry of the 1963 murders of four girls.
  - Police in Washington, D.C. announce that the skeletal remains of Federal Bureau of Prisons intern Chandra Levy, who has been missing for a year, have been found in Rock Creek Park.
- May 26 – I-40 bridge disaster: A barge collides with the Interstate 40 bridge across the Arkansas River in eastern Oklahoma, killing 14.

=== June ===
- June 5 – 14-year-old Elizabeth Smart is kidnapped from her bedroom in Salt Lake City, Utah. She is rescued nine months later.
- June 11
  - The first episode of American Idol airs.
  - Antonio Meucci is recognized as the first inventor of the telephone by the United States Congress.
- June 12 – The Los Angeles Lakers sweep the New Jersey Nets in the 2002 NBA Finals to win their third consecutive NBA championship.
- June 14 – In Karachi, Pakistan, a car bomb in front of the U.S. Consulate kills 12 Pakistanis and injures 50.
- June 21 – Walt Disney Pictures' 42nd feature film, Lilo & Stitch, is released to positive reviews and box-office success.
- June 23 – World Wrestling Entertainment holds its King of the Ring pay-per-view event from the Nationwide Arena in Columbus, Ohio.
- June 29 – Vice President Dick Cheney serves as acting president from 7:09 am to 9:24 am EST, while President George W. Bush undergoes a colonoscopy procedure under sedation.

=== July ===
- July 4 – 2002 Los Angeles International Airport shooting: Egyptian immigrant Hesham Mohamed Hadayet kills two and injures six before being killed by a security officer. The incident is called an act of terrorism.
- July 13 – A lightning strike sets off the Sour Biscuit Fire in Oregon and northern California, which burns 499,570 acres (2,022 km^{2}).
- July 15 – In Washington, D.C., "American Taliban" John Walker Lindh pleads guilty to aiding the enemy and possession of explosives during the commission of a felony; Lindh agrees to serve 10 years in prison for each charge.
- July 20 – The Adventures of Jimmy Neutron: Boy Genius debuts on Nickelodeon.
- July 21
  - Telecommunications giant WorldCom files for Chapter 11 bankruptcy protection, the largest such filing in United States history.
  - World Wrestling Entertainment holds its Vengeance pay-per-view event from the Joe Louis Arena in Detroit, Michigan.
- July 24 – Congressman James Traficant of Ohio is expelled from the House of Representatives by a vote of 420–1 following his ten felony convictions.

=== August ===
- August 12 – In Arlington, Virginia, US Airways declares bankruptcy.
- August 25 – World Wrestling Entertainment holds its SummerSlam pay-per-view event from the Nassau Coliseum in Uniondale, New York.

=== September ===
- September 2 – Liberty's Kids premieres on PBS Kids.
- September 4 – Kelly Clarkson wins the first American Idol competition.
- September 5 – The Sour Biscuit Fire in Oregon and northern California, which burned 499,570 acres (2,022 km^{2}), is contained.
- September 7 – The Fox Network's Fox Kids block (which had been on the air since 1990) airs for the final time. It was replaced the following week (on September 14) by the 4Kids-programmed FoxBox.
- September 11 – Thousands of people in New York City and across the nation attend ceremonies as the United States commemorates the first anniversary of the 9/11 attacks.
- September 12 – Iraq disarmament crisis: U.S. President George W. Bush addresses the U.N., and challenges its members to confront the "grave and gathering danger" of Iraq, or stand aside as the United States and likeminded nations act.
- September 14 – Major upheavals take place on Saturday mornings, as the four major networks change their programming on this day. Fox, having sold Fox Kids Worldwide to The Walt Disney Company the previous year, ends Fox Kids and sells its airtime to 4Kids Entertainment, who begin programming a new children's programming block as the Fox Box. Disney, meanwhile, having acquired the Fox Kids brand, ends Disney's One Saturday Morning on ABC and renamed ABC Kids. CBS, whose then-corporate sibling Nickelodeon programs its lineup, rebrands its Nick Jr. on CBS block as Nick on CBS and refocuses it on children 2–11 years old, while NBC signs a contract with Discovery Networks to air a programming strand called Discovery Kids on NBC (a spinoff of a former digital cable channel Discovery Kids), which replaces the teen-oriented block TNBC.
- September 22 – World Wrestling Entertainment holds its Unforgiven pay-per-view event from the Staples Center in Los Angeles, California.

=== October ===
- October 2
  - The Beltway sniper attacks begin with five shootings taking place in Montgomery County, Maryland.
  - The Congress of the United States passes a joint resolution, which authorizes the President to use the United States Armed Forces as he deems necessary and appropriate, against Iraq.
- October 9 – The Dot-com bubble downward market reaches bottom, when the Dow Jones Industrial Average slips below 7,200.
- October 9–10 – Congress passes the Iraq Resolution authorizing the Iraq War.
- October 16 – The Iraq War Resolution is authorized by a majority of the U.S. Congress.
- October 20 – World Wrestling Entertainment holds its No Mercy pay-per-view event from the Alltel Arena in North Little Rock, Arkansas.
- October 24 – The Beltway sniper attacks end with the arrest of John Allen Muhammad and Lee Boyd Malvo. The pair killed 10 people and wounded three others in the Baltimore–Washington Metropolitan Area in this series of attacks; they had killed seven other people in prior attacks.
- October 25 – U.S. Senator Paul Wellstone, his family, and his staff are killed in a plane accident at Eveleth, Minnesota.
- October 27 – The Anaheim Angels defeat the San Francisco Giants in Game 7 of the 2002 World Series to win their first World Series title.

=== November ===
November 25: The Department of Homeland Security is established

- November 2 – The Godless Americans March on Washington brings together 2,000 atheists, freethinkers, agnostics, and humanists in a mile-long parade down the National Mall.
- November 3 – The 7.9 M_{w} Denali earthquake shakes the Alaska Interior with a maximum Mercalli intensity of IX (Violent), causing one injury and $20–56 million in losses.
- November 5 – Republicans gain a majority in the Senate and a larger majority in the House of Representatives following congressional elections.
- November 6 – The U.S. Federal Reserve System drops its primary discount rate by 25 basis points to 0.75%, putting the real interest rate solidly below the inflation rate.
- November 7 – Iran bans the advertising of United States products.
- November 8 – The United Nations passes Resolution 1441 giving Iraqi President Saddam Hussein a final opportunity to cooperate with international weapons inspectors.
- November 12 – Toxicologist Kristin Rossum is convicted of the 2000 murder of her husband Gregory de Viller in San Diego. Rossum had poisoned her victim using fentanyl, passing off the crime as a suicide.
- November 16 – A Campaign against Climate Change march takes place in London from Lincoln's Inn Fields, past Esso offices to the United States Embassy.
- November 17 – World Wrestling Entertainment holds its Survivor Series pay-per-view event from Madison Square Garden in New York City, New York.
- November 25 – U.S. President George W. Bush signs the Homeland Security Act into law, establishing the Department of Homeland Security. It was the largest U.S. government reorganization since the creation of the Department of Defense in 1947.
- November 27 – Walt Disney Pictures' 43rd feature film, Treasure Planet, is released to positive reception, but turns outs to be a rare box office bomb from the studio.

=== December ===
- December 9 – United Airlines, the second largest airline in the world, files for bankruptcy.
- December 13 – President George W. Bush announces a smallpox vaccination program for military personnel, as well as for civilian healthcare and emergency workers to protect against bioterrorism risks. He announces that the public will not be called up for shots until 2004 at the earliest.
- December 15 – World Wrestling Entertainment holds its Armageddon pay-per-view event from the Office Depot Center in Sunrise, Florida.
- December 21 – President Bush receives his smallpox vaccine.

=== Ongoing ===
- Iraqi no-fly zones (1991–2003)
- War in Afghanistan (2001–2021)

== Births ==
=== January ===
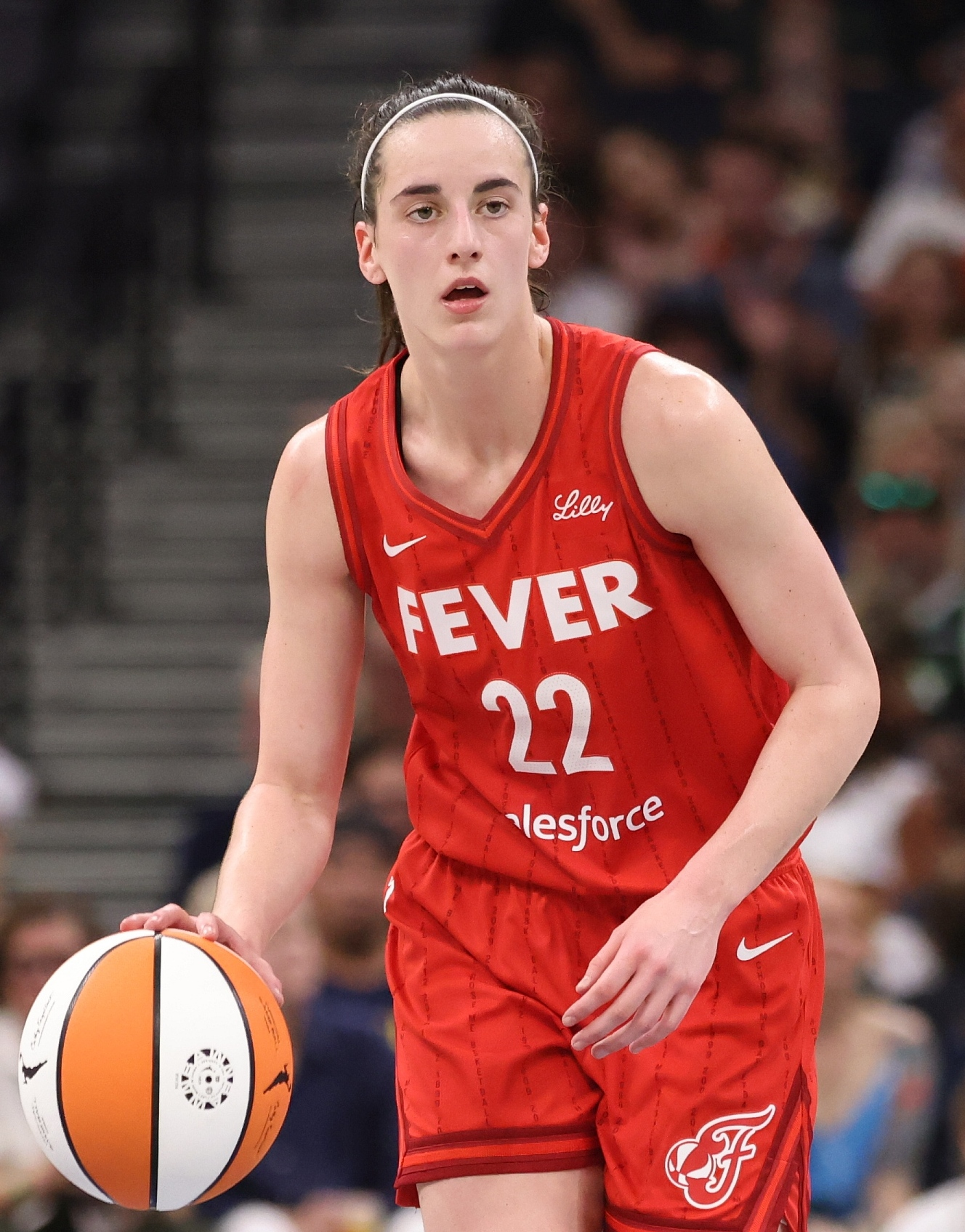
Caitlin Clark

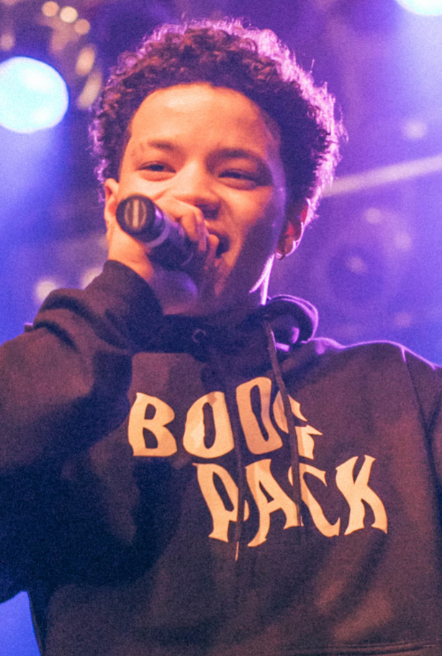
Lil Mosey

Tyla

- January 10 – Laken Riley, murder victim (d. 2024)
- January 11 – Dro Kenji, musician
- January 12 – Balin Miller, climber (d. 2025)
- January 15 – Levon Hawke, actor
- January 20
  - Michael Barbieri, actor
  - Joshua Colley, actor and singer
- January 21 – Noah Adnan, Indonesian soccer player
- January 22 – Caitlin Clark, basketball player
- January 25
  - Lil Mosey, rapper
  - Morgan Maly, basketball player
- January 30 – Tyla, singer

=== February ===
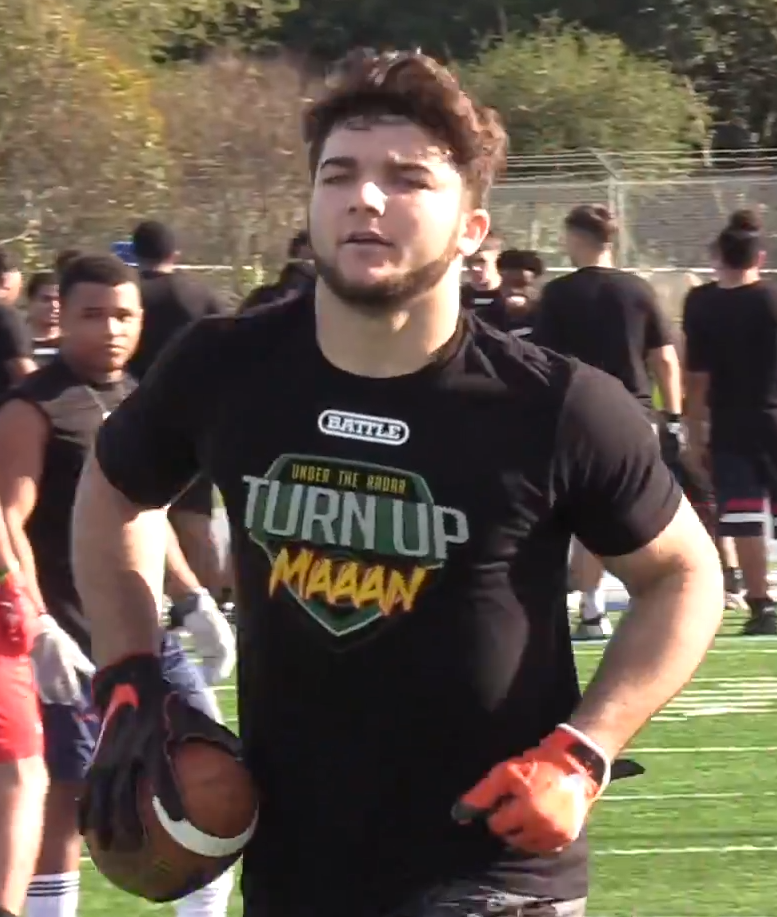
Cam Skattebo

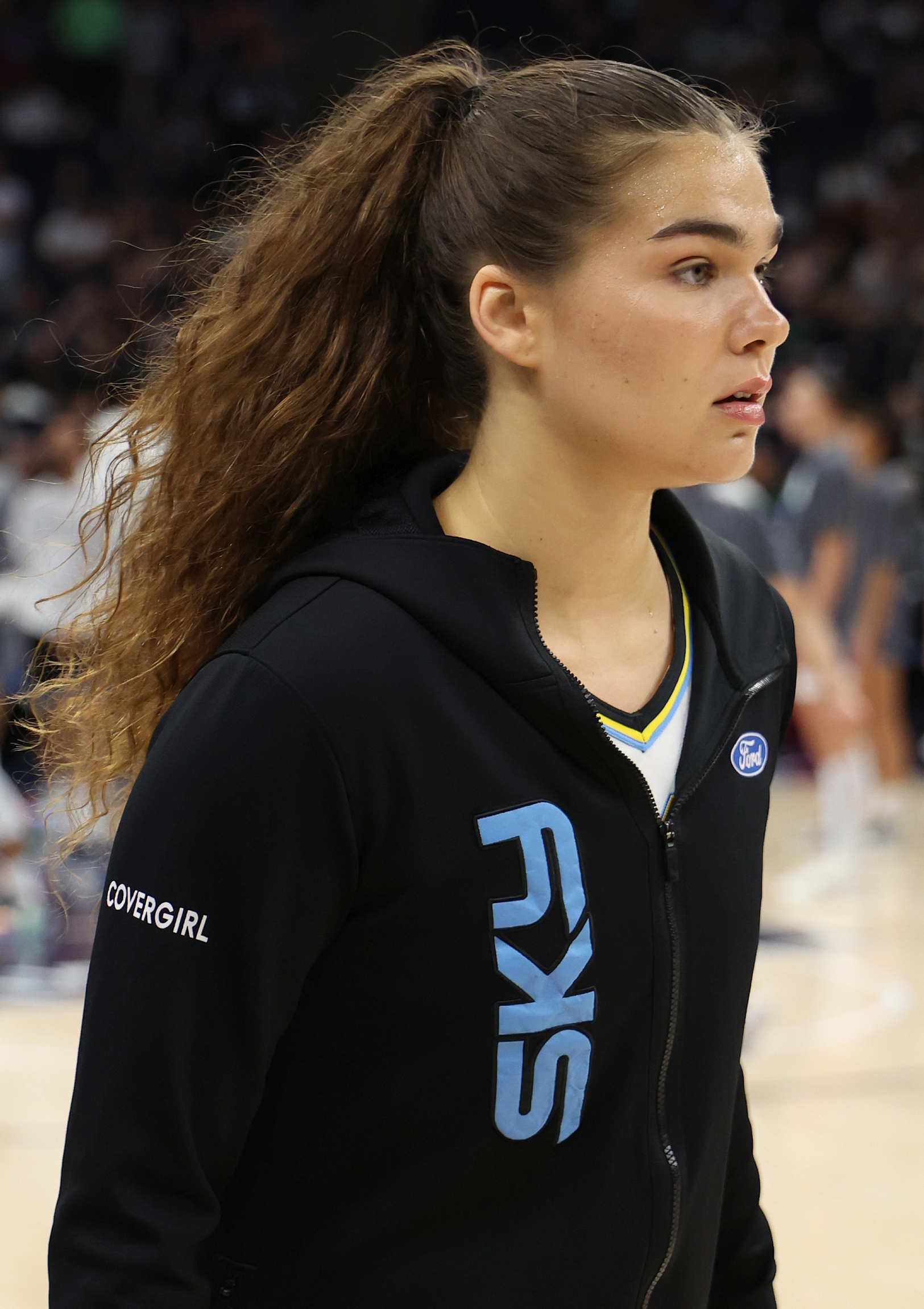
Maddy Westbeld

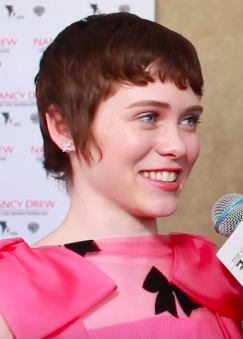
Sophia Lillis

- February 5
  - Davis Cleveland, actor
  - Cam Skattebo, football player
- February 10 – Maddy Westbeld, basketball player
- February 13 – Sophia Lillis, actress
- February 21 – Duwap Kaine, rapper
- February 26 – Kendra and Maliyah Herrin, conjoined twins

=== March ===
- March 4 – Jacob Hopkins, actor
- March 7 – Darby Glass, icon
- March 15 – Sam McCarthy, actor

=== April ===
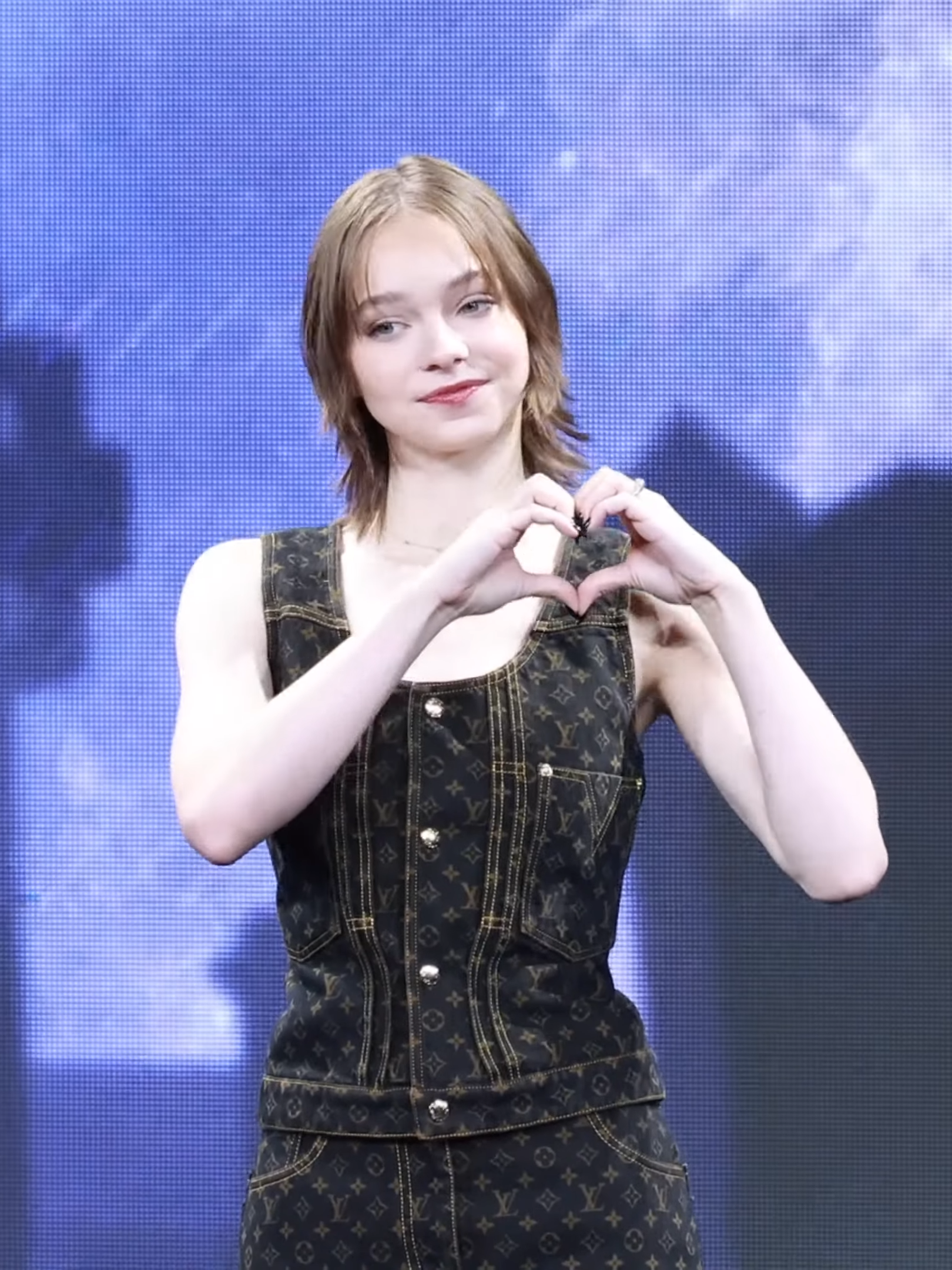
Emma Myers

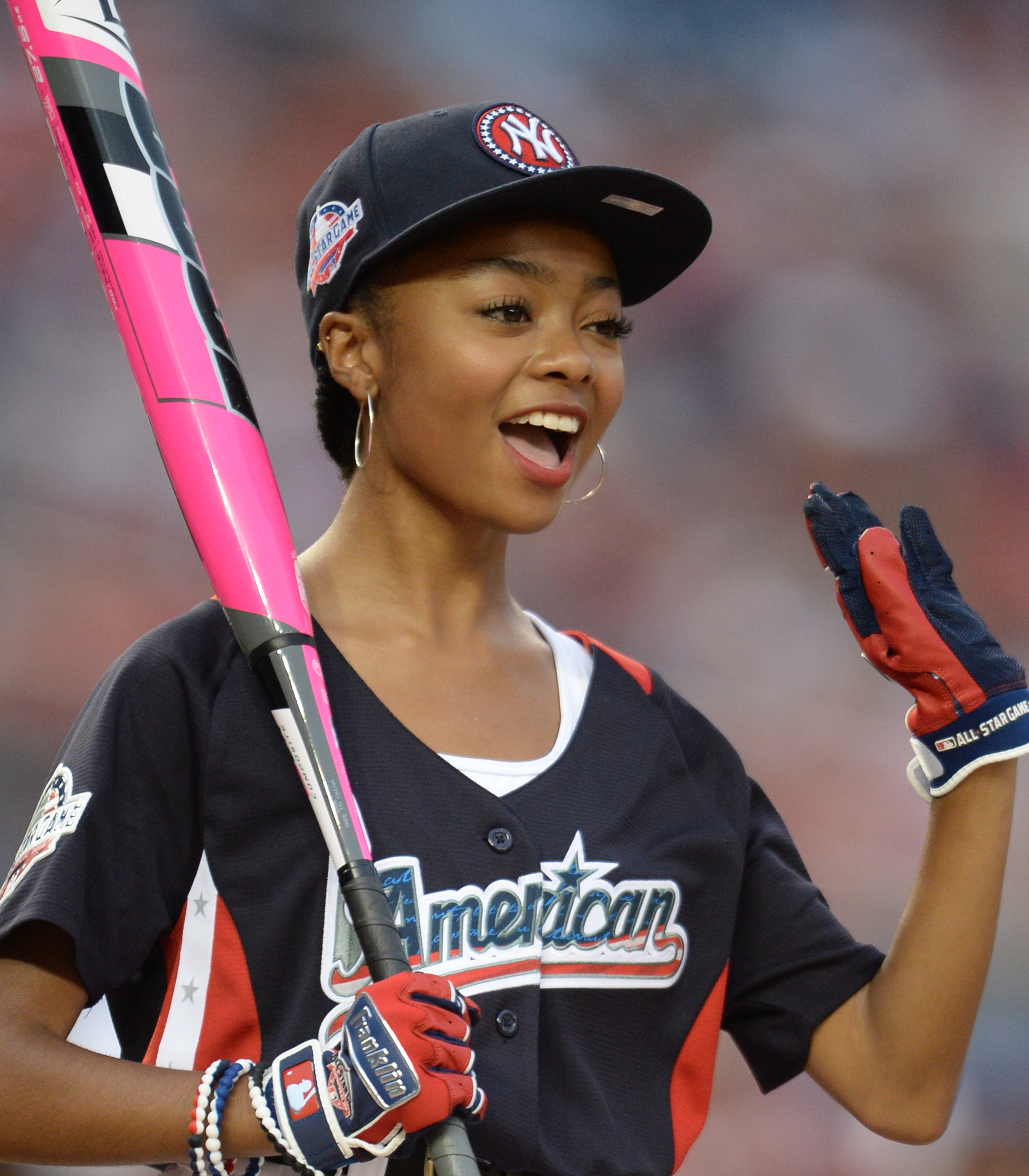
Skai Jackson

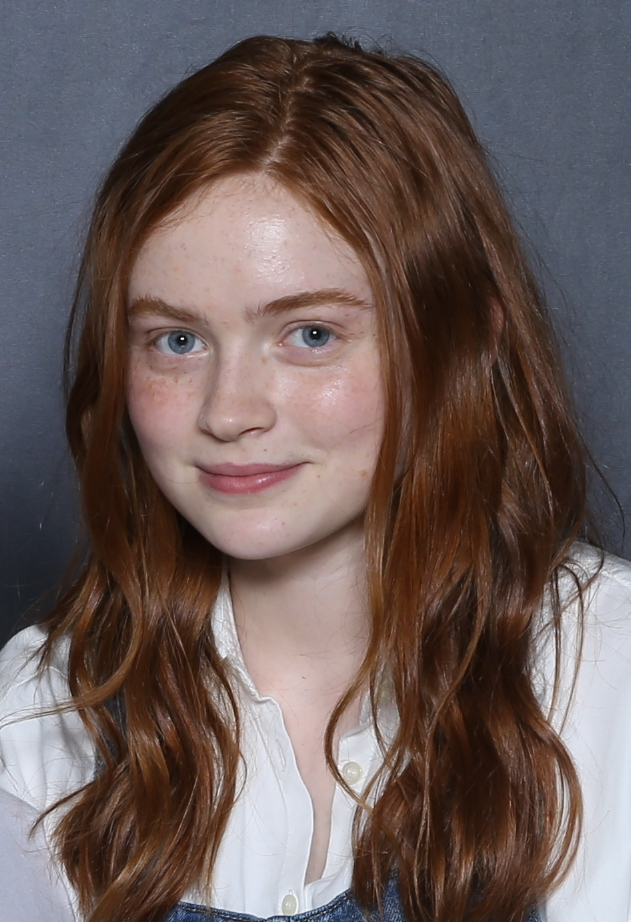
Sadie Sink

- April 2 – Emma Myers, actress
- April 6 – Andrea Botez, chess player
- April 8
  - Skai Jackson, actress
  - Ken San Jose, Filipino-American dancer
- April 10 – Ava Michelle, actress, dancer, and model
- April 16 – Sadie Sink, actress
- April 18 – Noah Thompson, singer
- April 19 – Loren Gray, social media personality
- April 24 – Skylar Stecker, singer and actress
- April 25 – Eitan Bernath, social media personality
- April 29 – Grace Kaufman, actress

=== May ===
Emily Alyn Lind

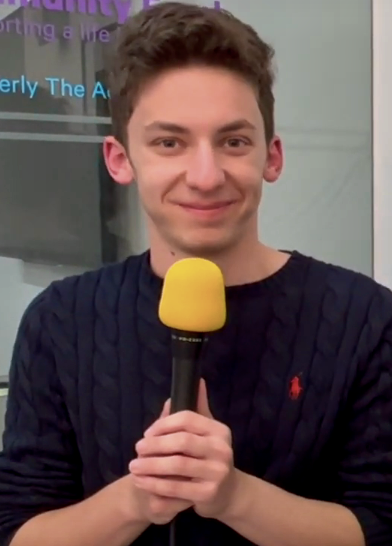
Andrew Barth Feldman

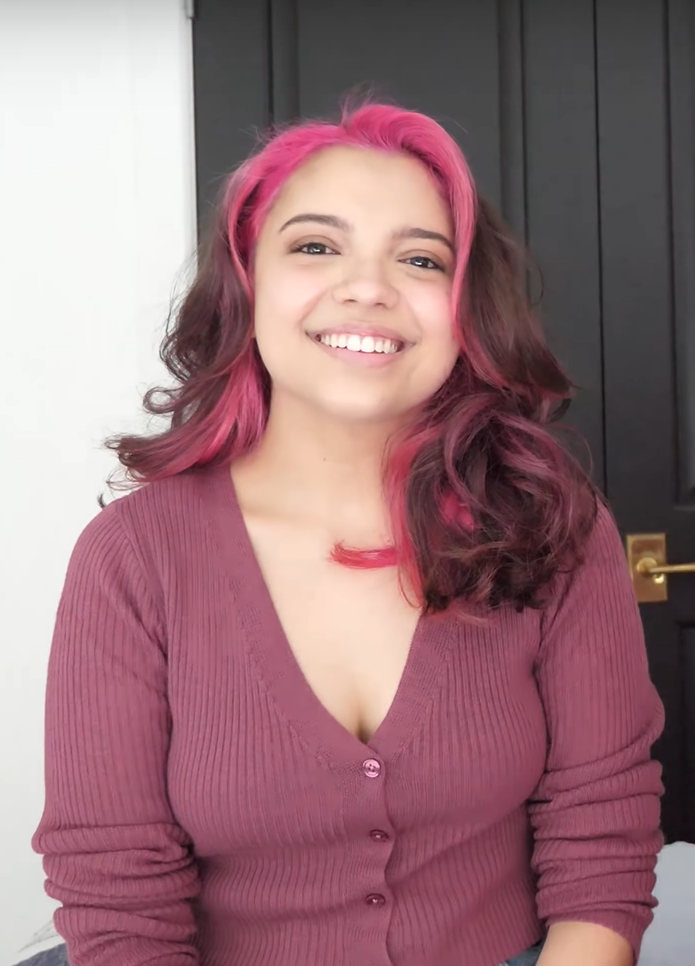
Cree Cicchino

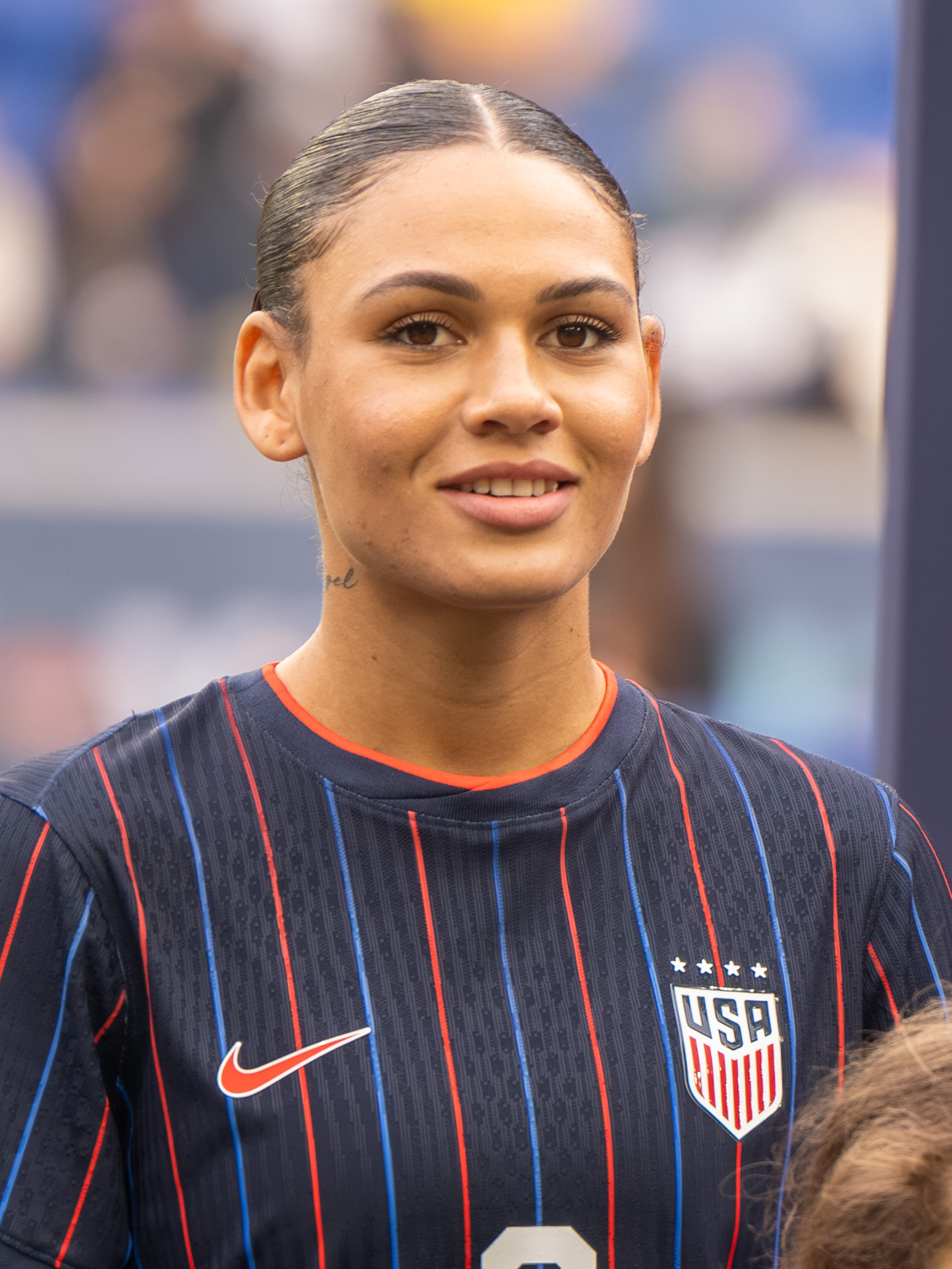
Trinity Rodman

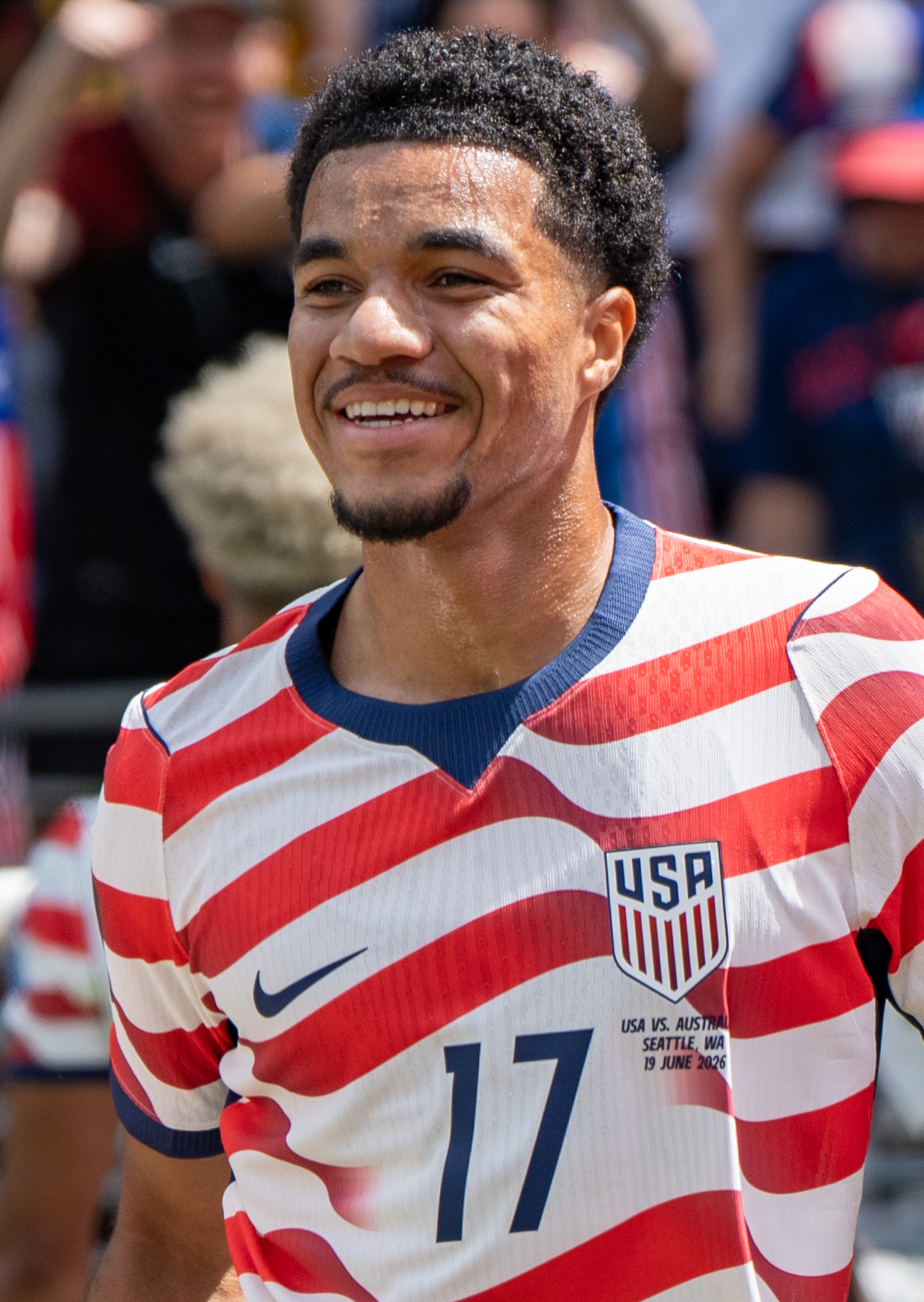
Malik Tillman

- May 6
  - Emily Alyn Lind, actress
  - Angel Reese, basketball player
- May 7
  - Jake Bongiovi, actor
  - Andrew Barth Feldman, actor
- May 9 – Cree Cicchino, actress
- May 15 – Chase Hudson, social media influencer
- May 20 – Trinity Rodman, soccer player
- May 28 – Malik Tillman, soccer player

=== June ===
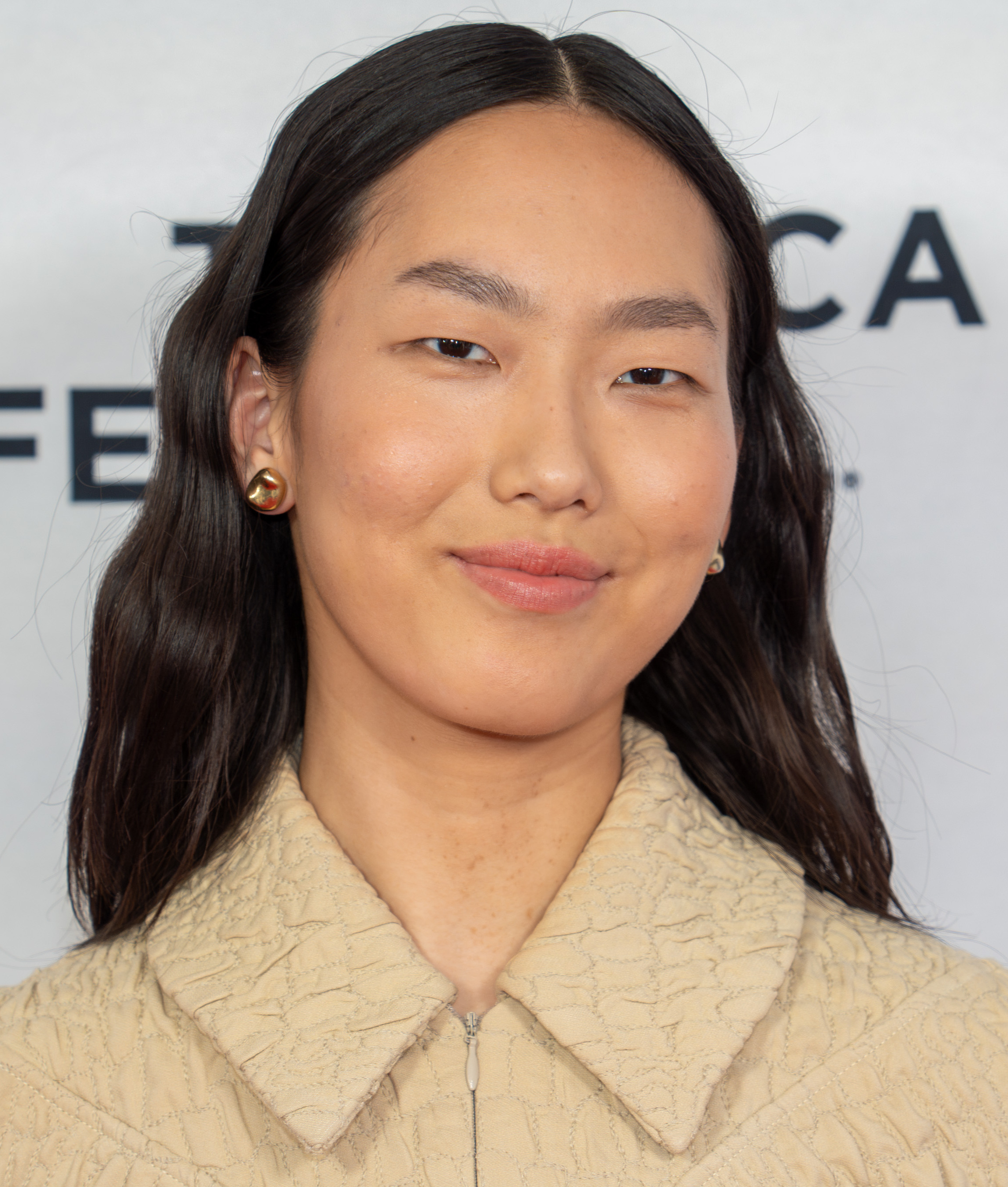
Madison Hu

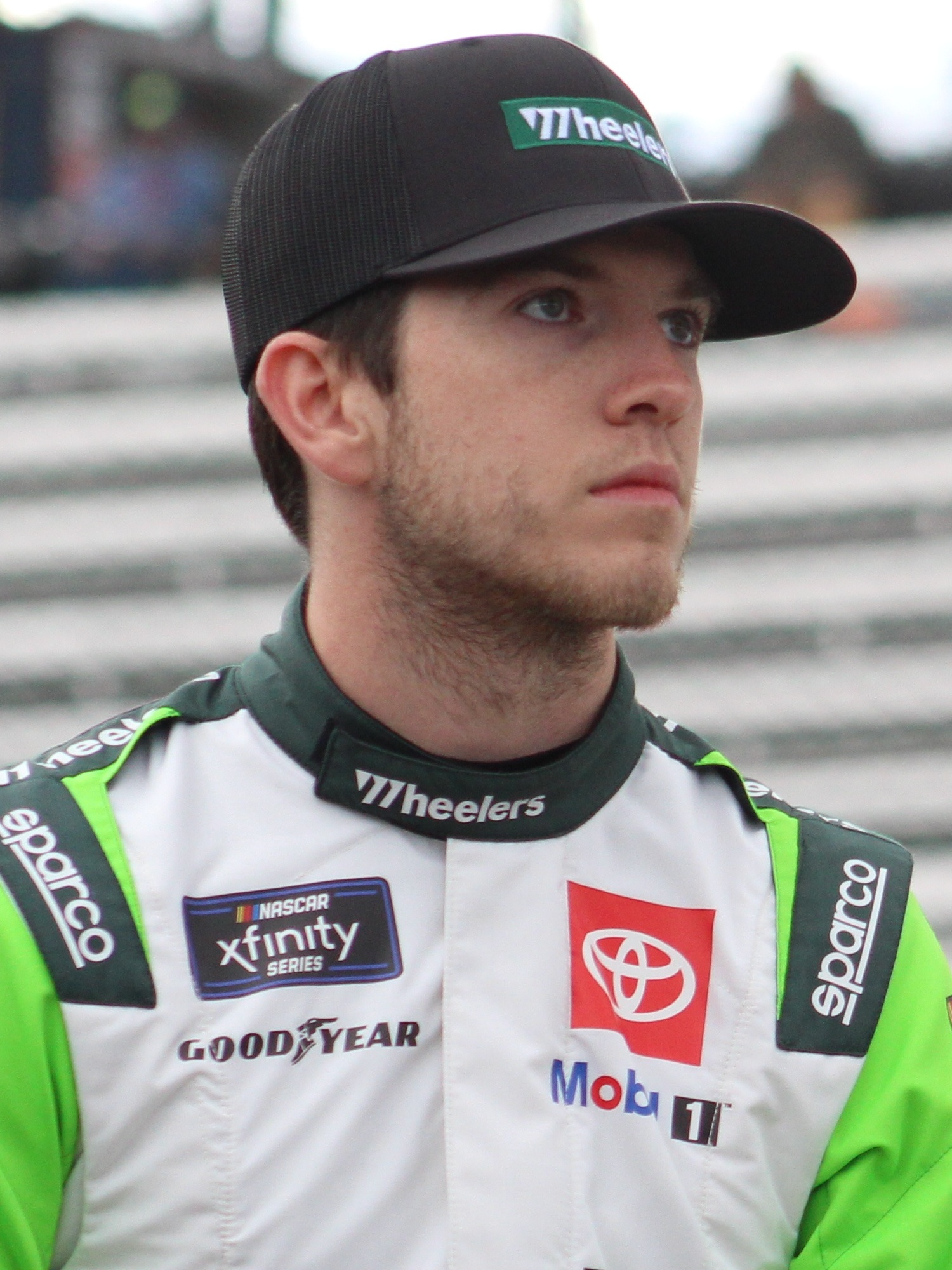
Chandler Smith

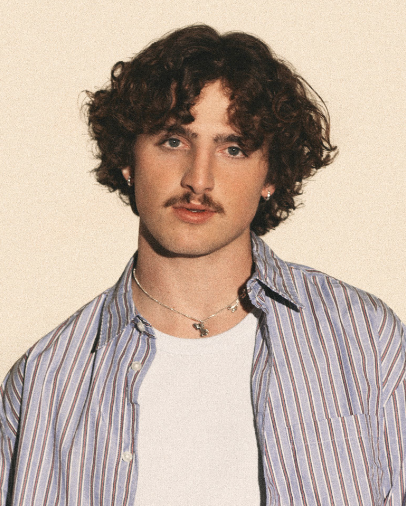
Benson Boone

- June 2 – Madison Hu, actress
- June 3 – Eva Bella, voice of young Elsa in the Disney movie Frozen
- June 25
  - Tamir Rice, African-American boy killed by police (d. 2014)
  - Benson Boone, American singer
- June 26 – Chandler Smith, race car driver
- June 29 – Marlhy Murphy, musician, actress and media personality

=== July ===
- July 24 – Benjamin Flores Jr., actor and rapper
- July 26 – Michael Campion, actor
- July 31 – Abi Carter, singer

=== August ===
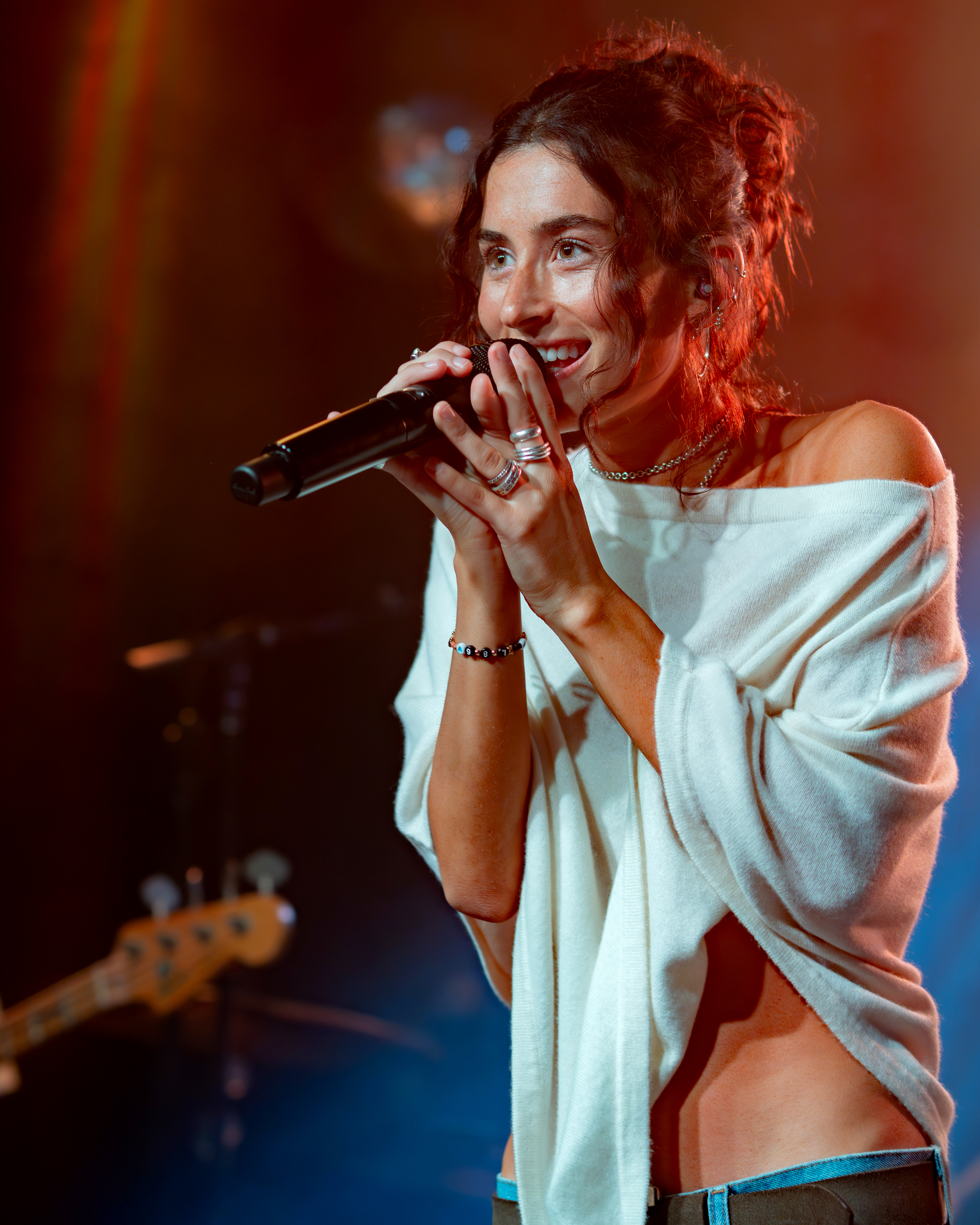
Stella Lefty

Katie Feeney

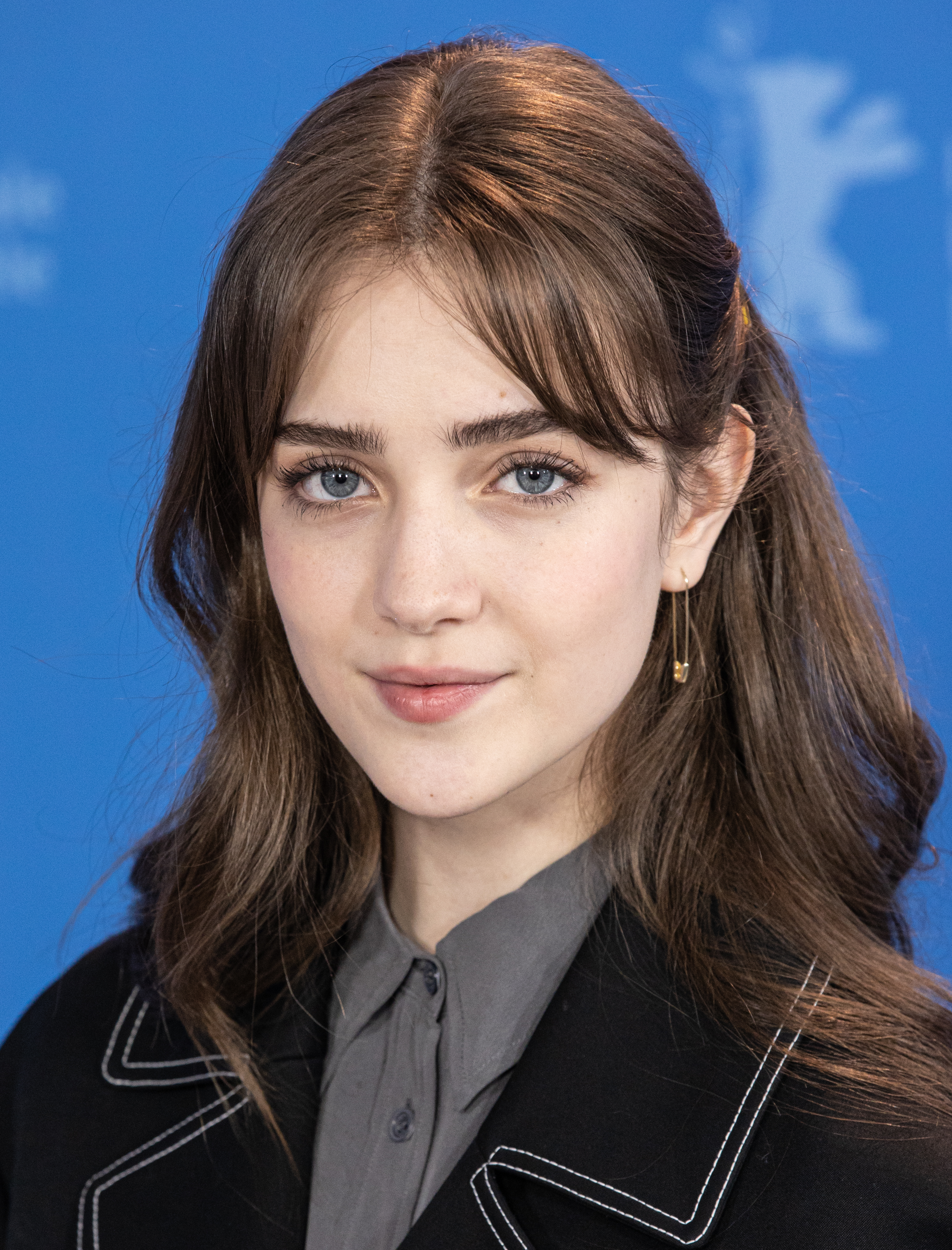
Talia Ryder

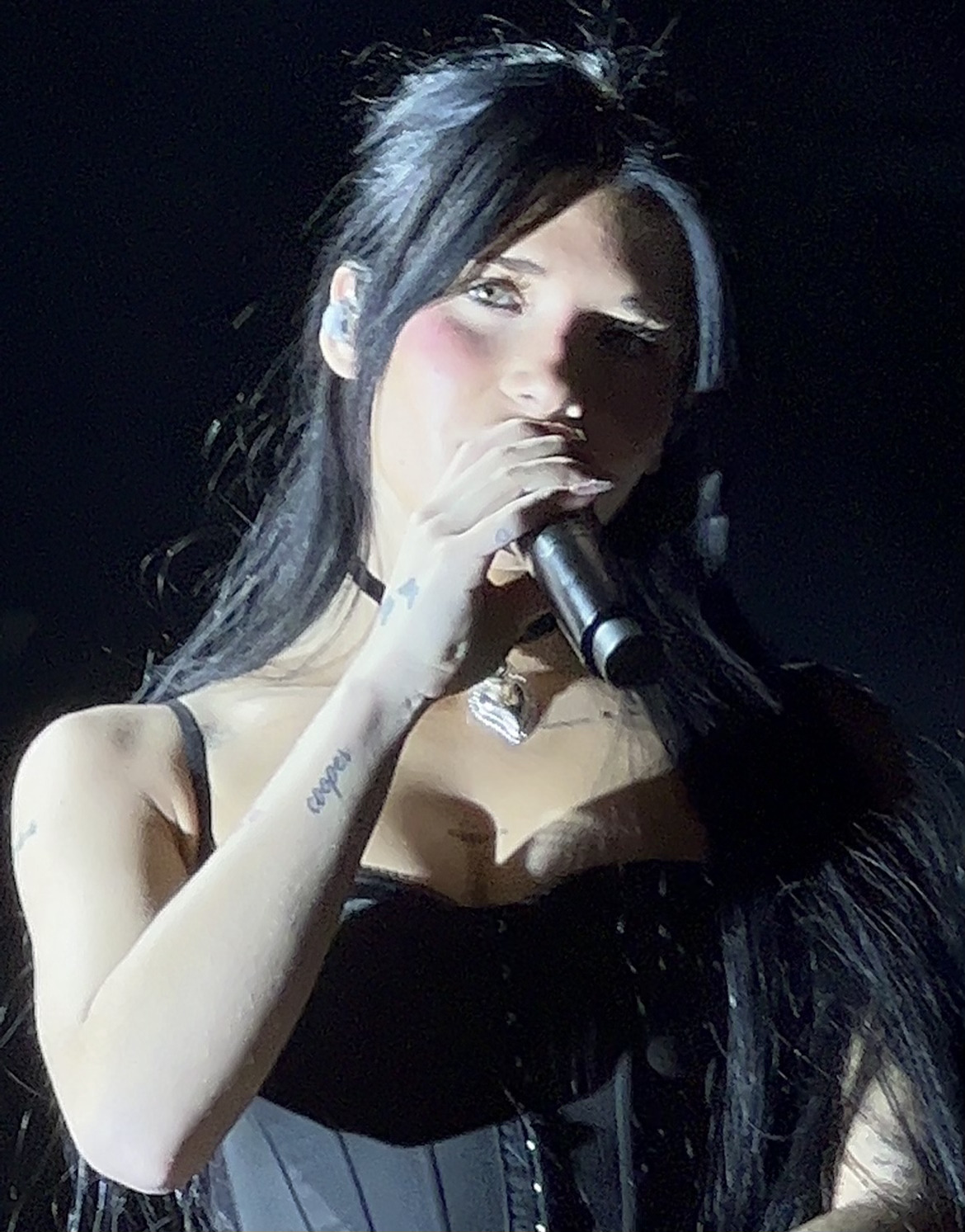
Nessa Barrett

- August 1 – Oona Laurence, actress
- August 6 – Nessa Barrett, singer
- August 9 – Wan Kuzri Wan Kamal, Malaysian soccer player
- August 12 – Ugonne Onyiah, basketball player
- August 13 – Stella Lefty, singer
- August 16
  - Katie Feeney, social media influencer
  - Talia Ryder, actress
- August 19 – Brighton Sharbino, actress
- August 26 – Lil Tecca, rapper
- August 30 – Bktherula, rapper

=== September ===
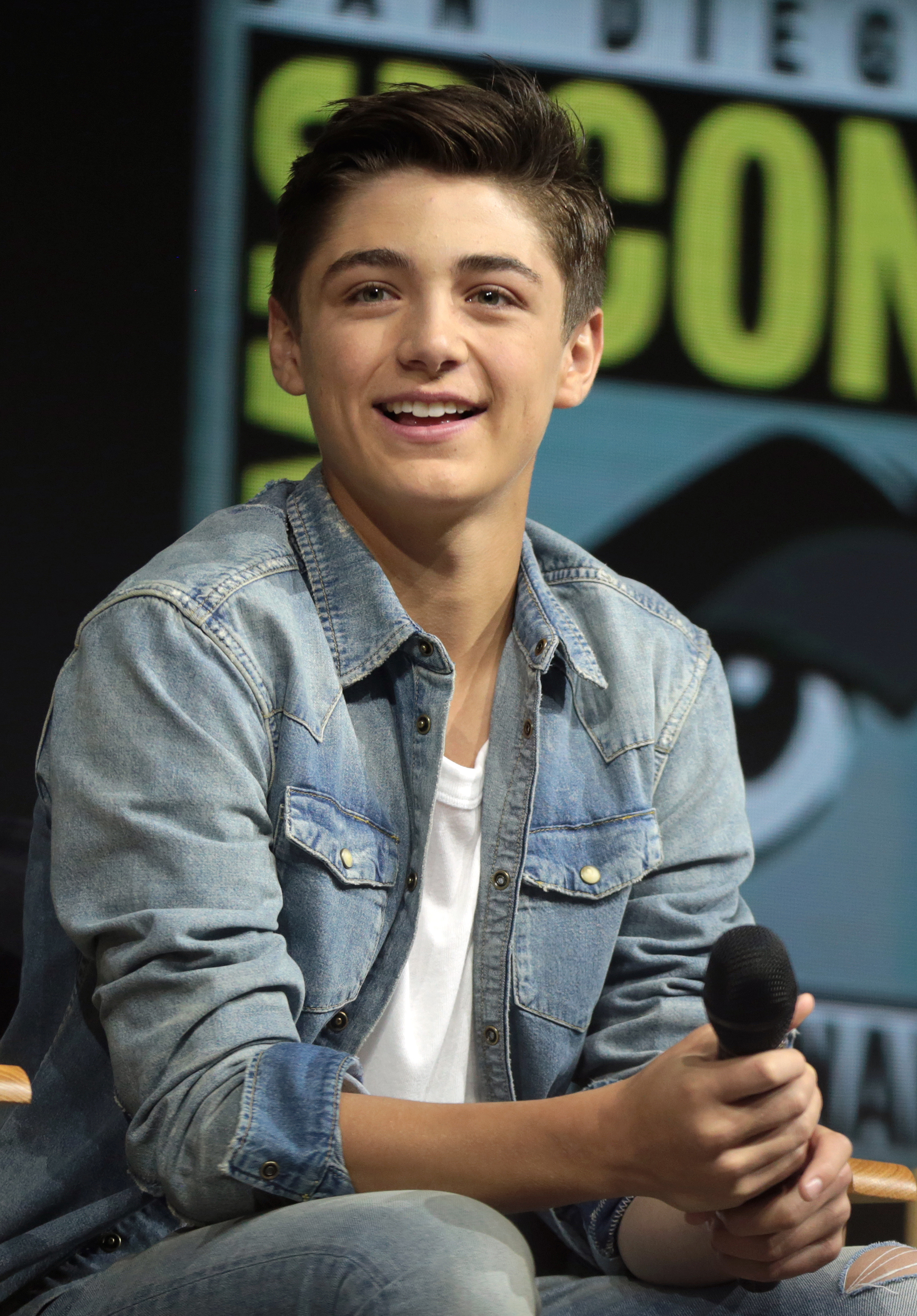
Asher Angel

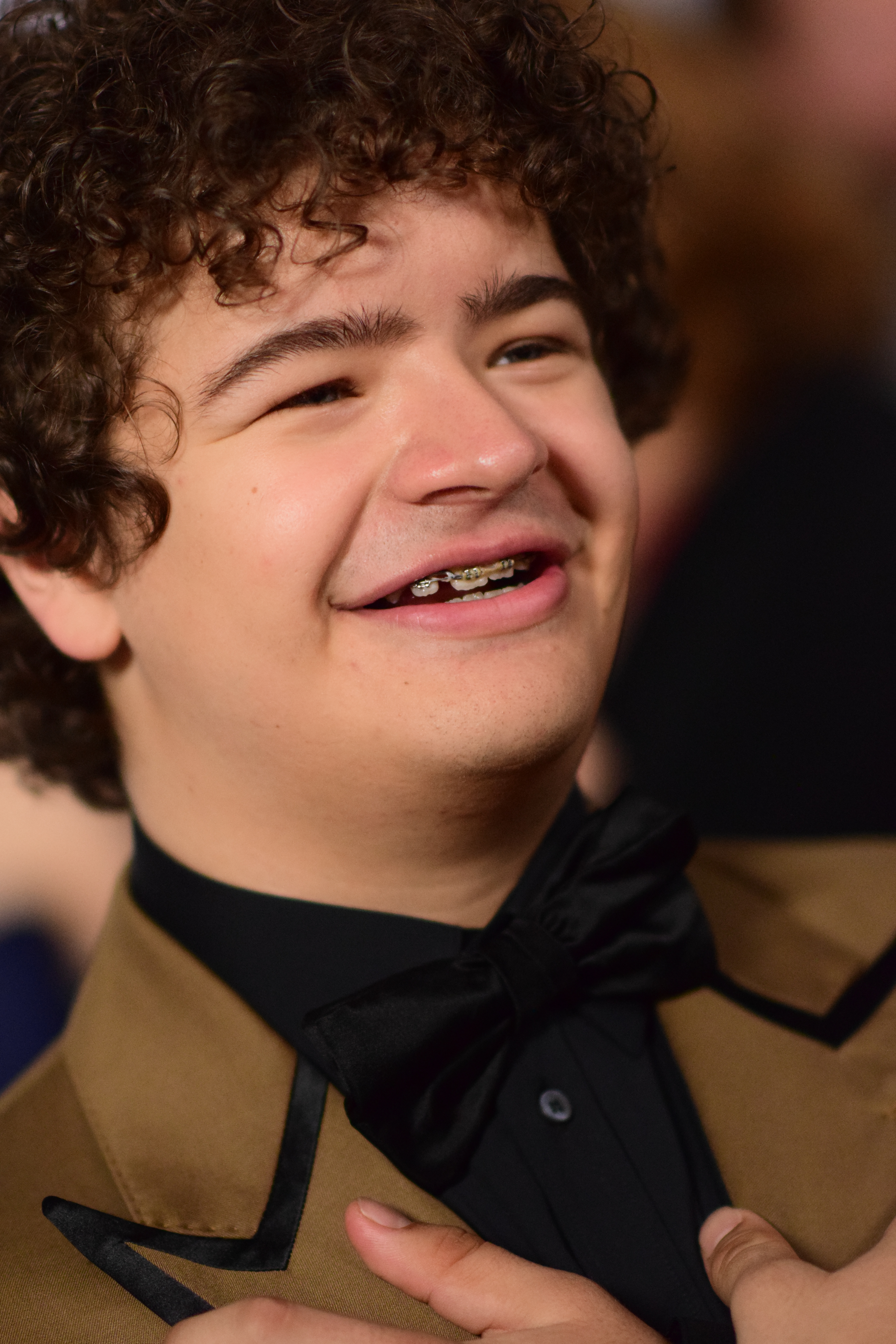
Gaten Matarazzo

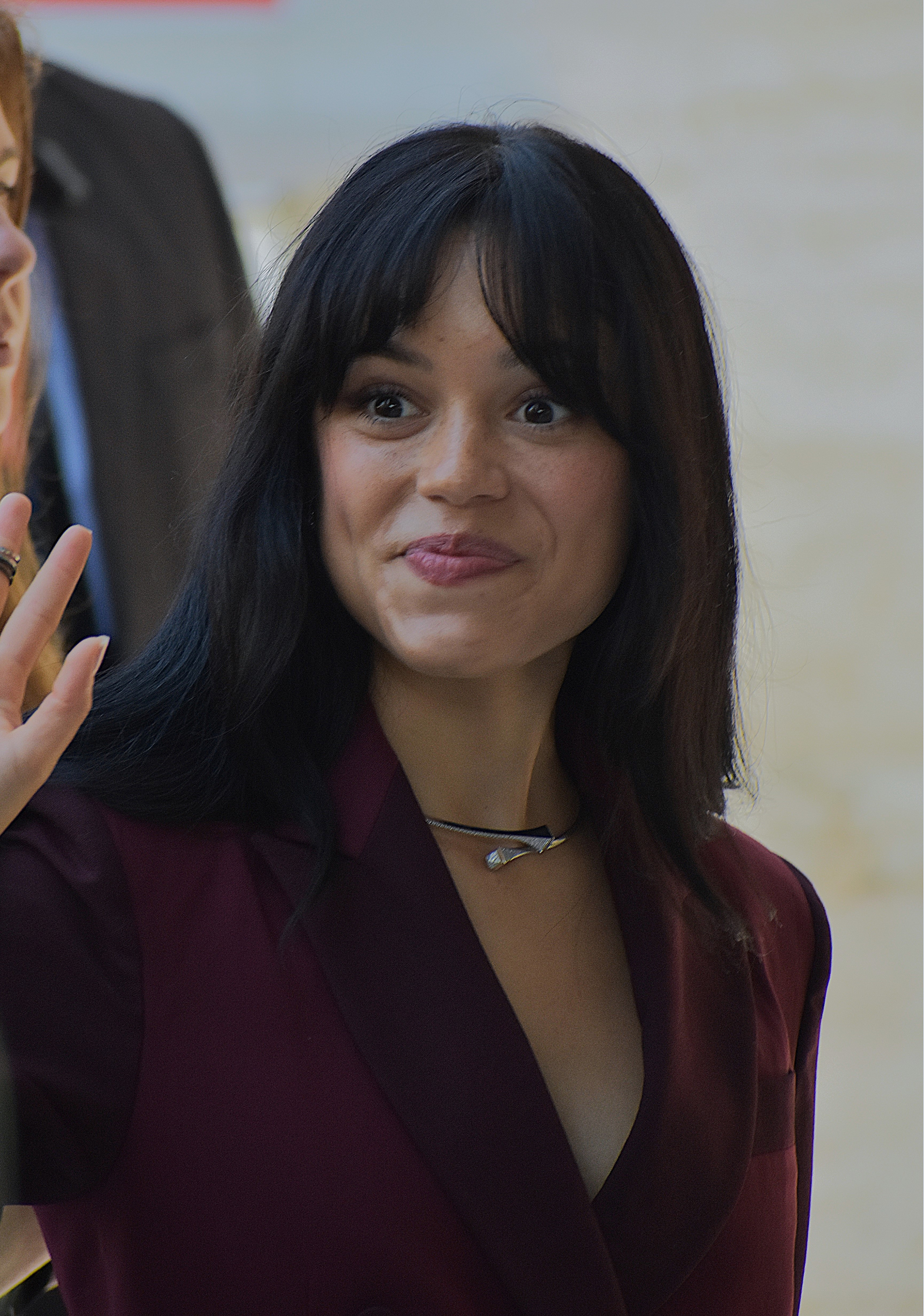
Jenna Ortega

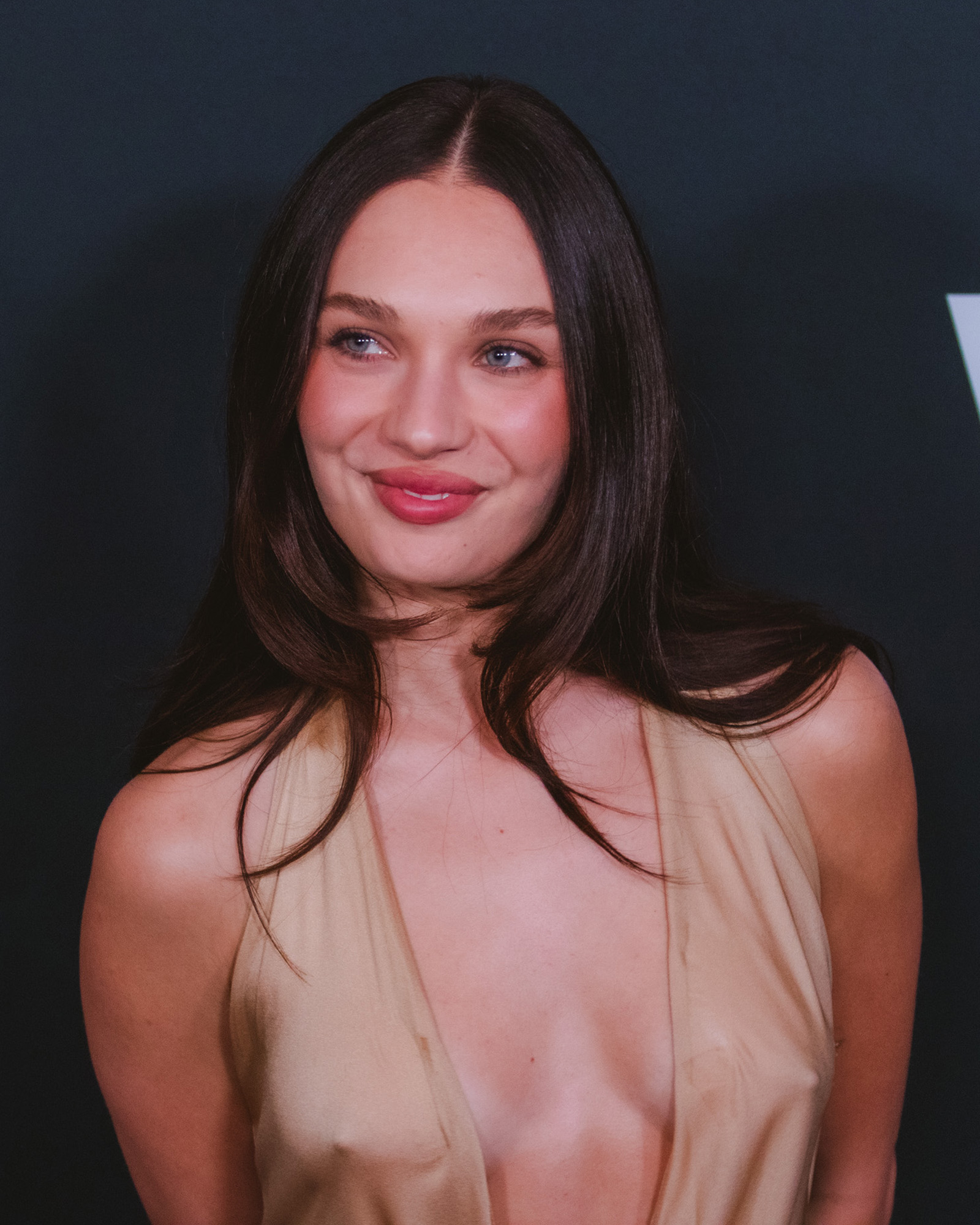
Maddie Ziegler

- September 6 – Asher Angel, actor
- September 7 – Ericdoa, musician
- September 8 – Gaten Matarazzo, actor
- September 13 – Chiara Aurelia, actress
- September 15
  - Rhema Marvanne, singer
  - Ken Pomeroy, singer
- September 27 – Jenna Ortega, actress
- September 29 – Chloe Moriondo, musician and YouTuber
- September 30 – Maddie Ziegler, dancer

=== October ===
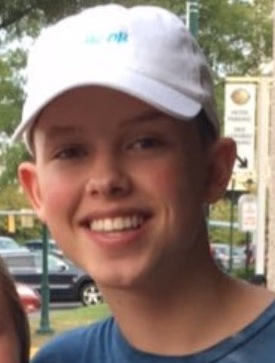
Jacob Sartorius

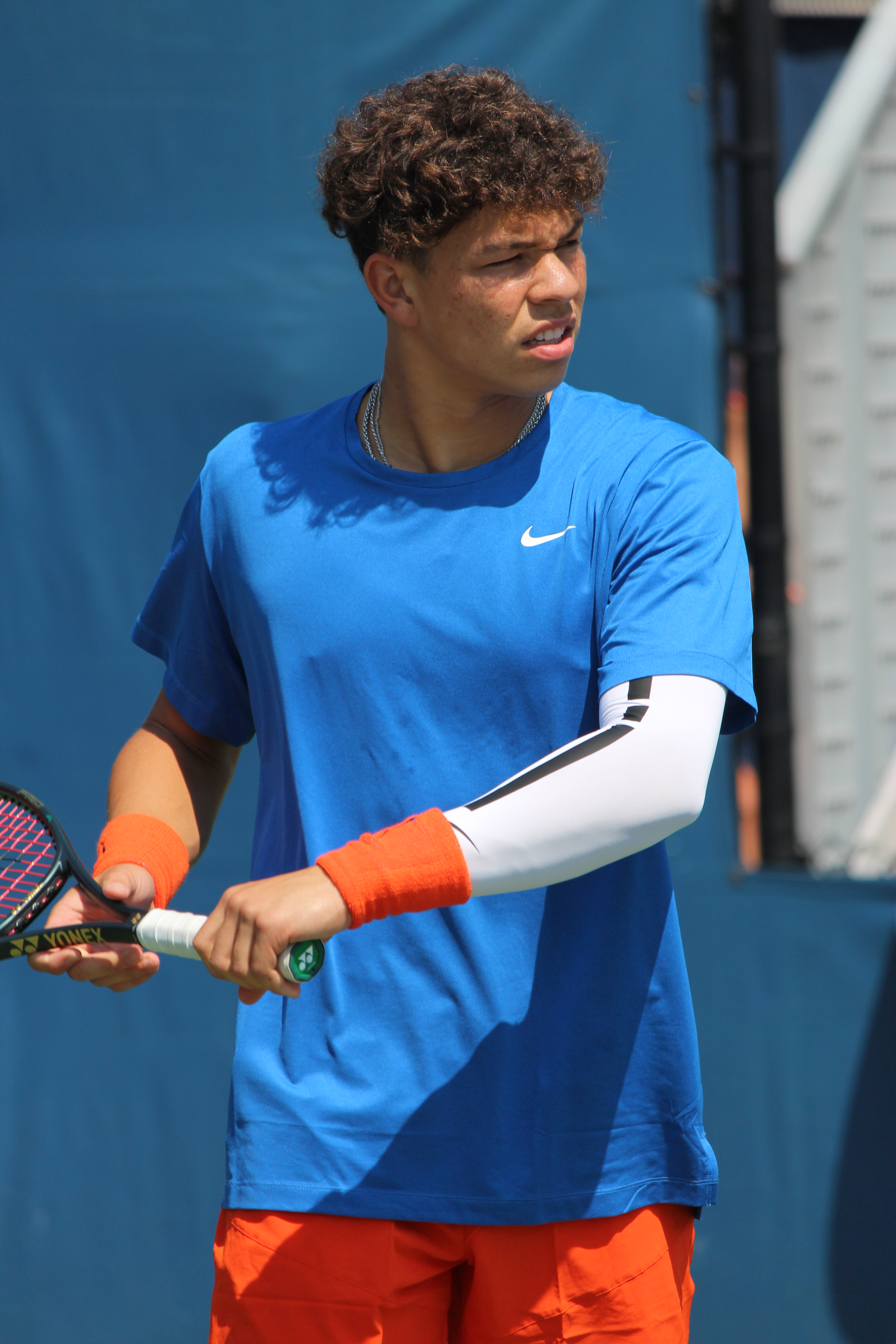
Ben Shelton

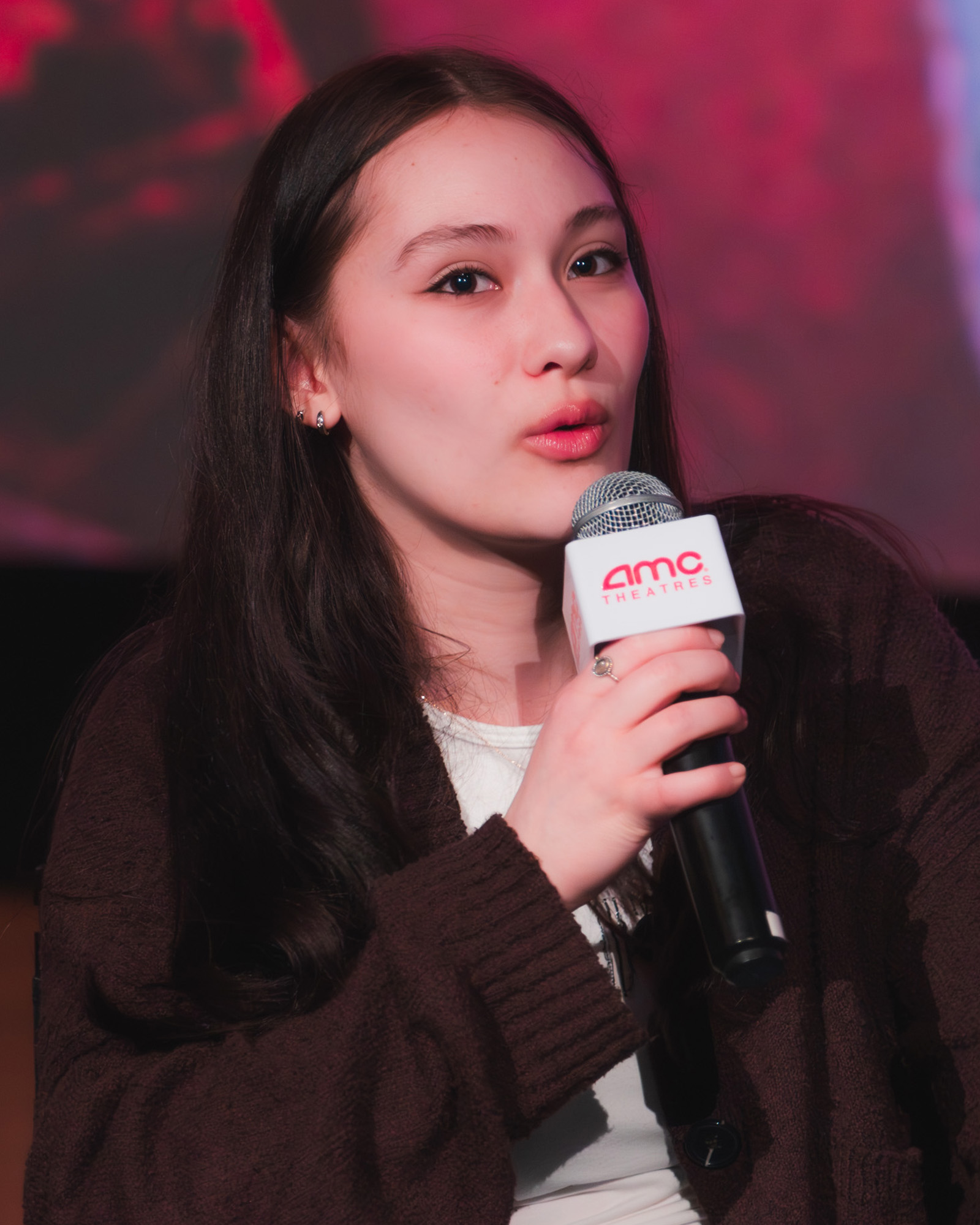
Lola Tung

- October 2 – Jacob Sartorius, singer
- October 6 – Rio Mangini, actor
- October 9 – Ben Shelton, tennis player
- October 12 – Iris Apatow, actress
- October 14 – Caroline Harvey, hockey player
- October 15 – Malu Trevejo, Cuban-American social media personality
- October 16 – Madison Wolfe, actress
- October 24 – Lyn Lapid, singer
- October 25 – Johnny Sequoyah, actress
- October 26 – Emma Schweiger, actress
- October 28 – Lola Tung, actress

=== November ===
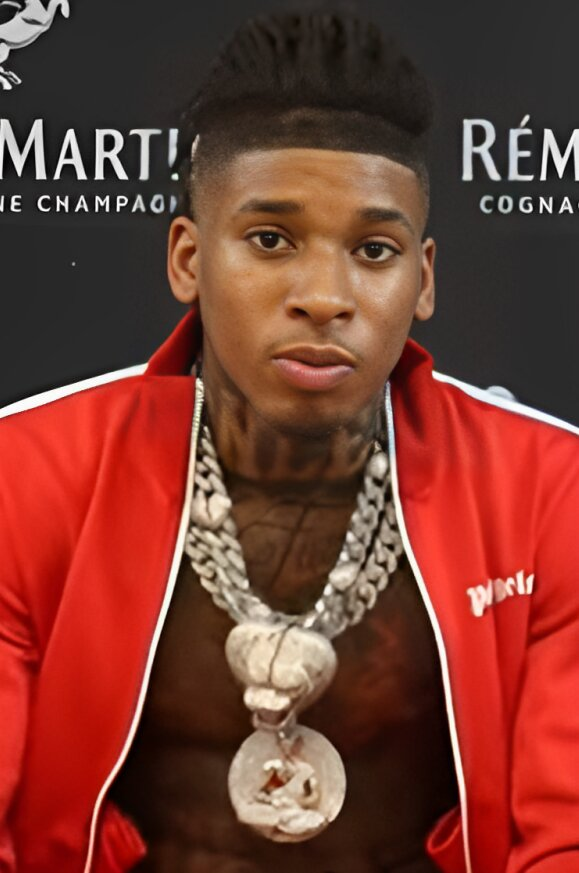
NLE Choppa

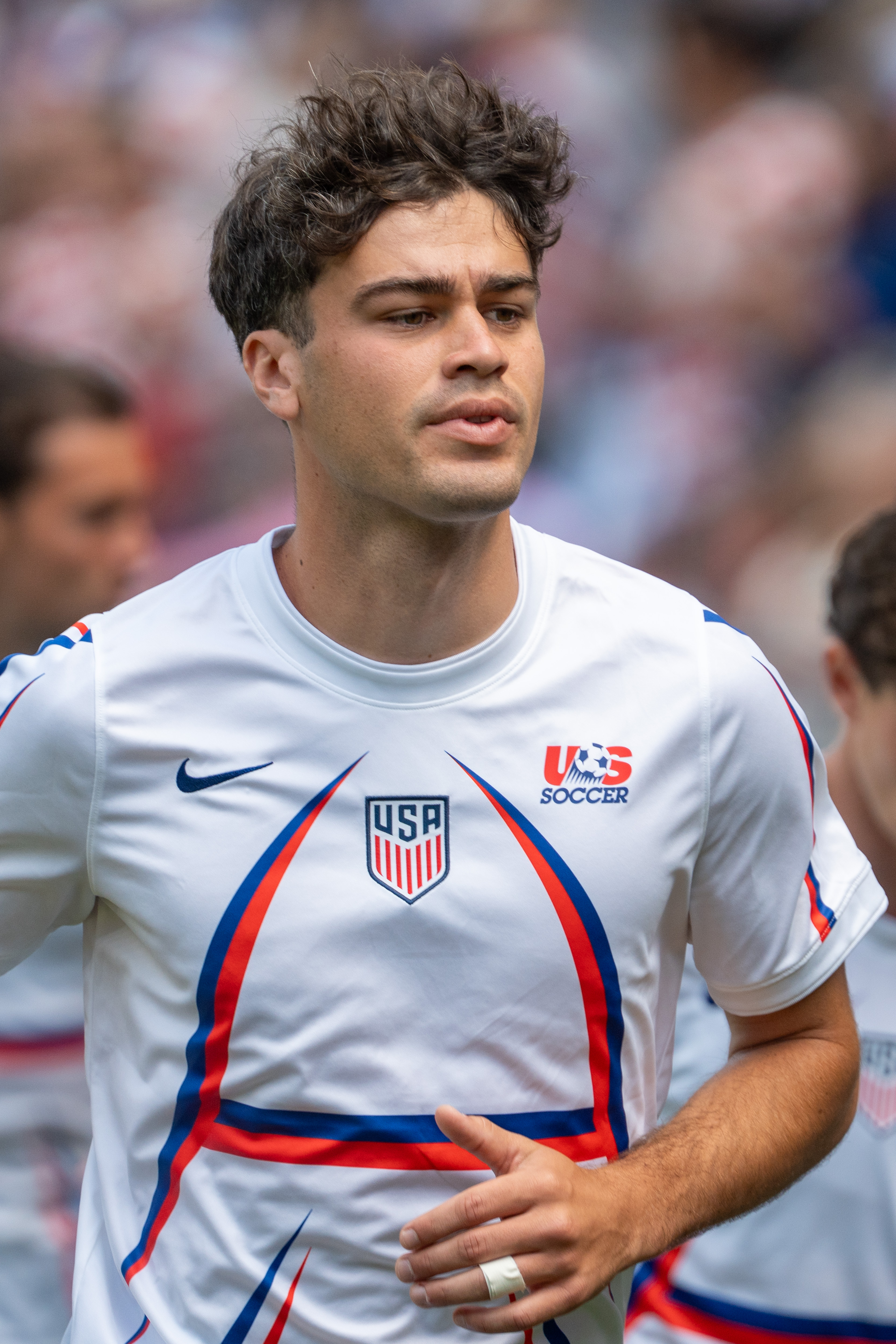
Giovanni Reyna

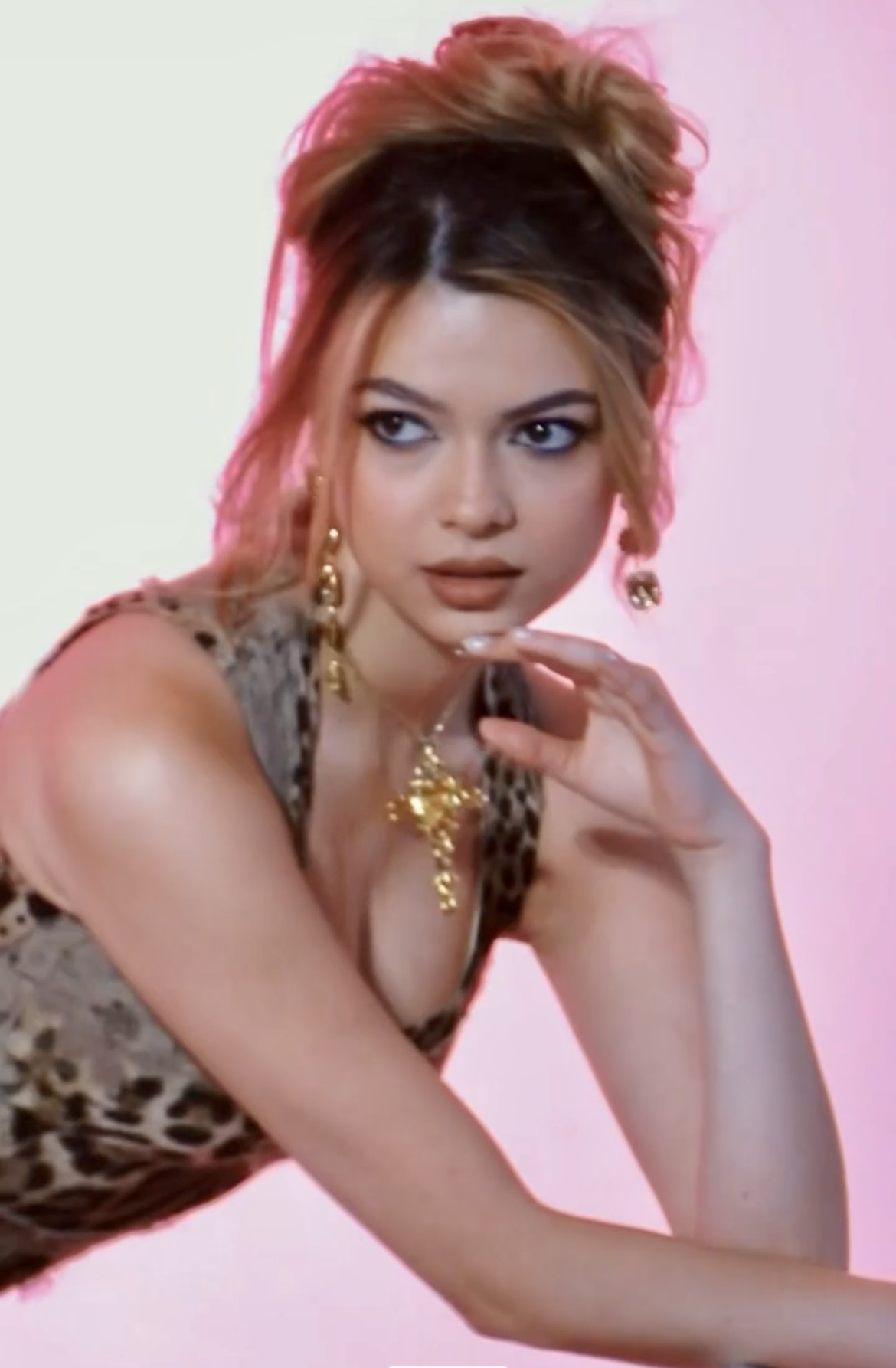
Nikki Hahn

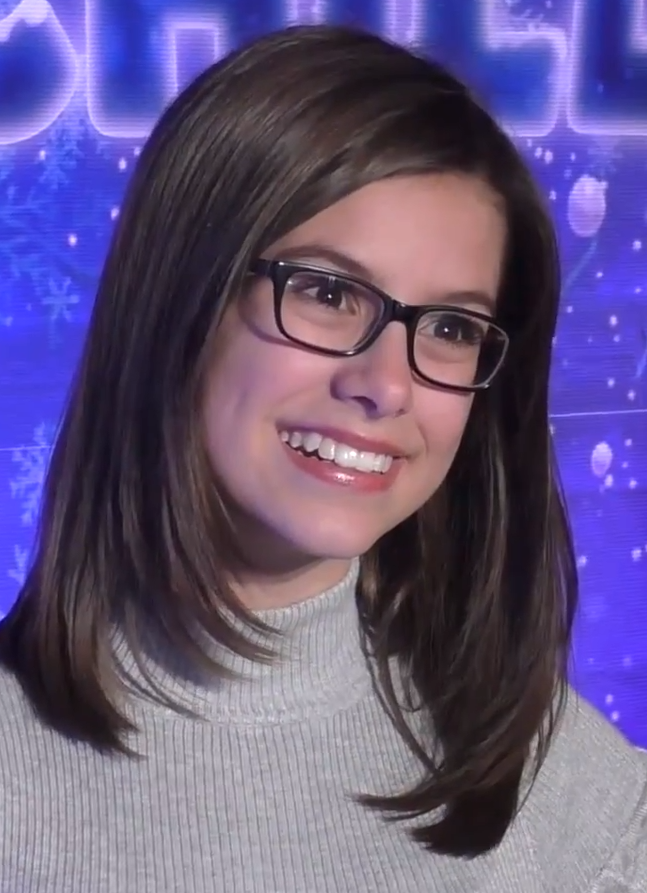
Madisyn Shipman

- November 1 – NLE Choppa, rapper
- November 11
  - Azzi Fudd, college basketball player
  - Lesandro Guzman-Feliz, murder victim (d. 2018)
- November 12 – Paolo Banchero, American-Italian basketball player
- November 13 – Nikki Hahn, actress
- November 13 – Giovanni Reyna, soccer player
- November 14 – Ben Bowen, notable victim (d. 2005)
- November 20 – Madisyn Shipman, actress
- November 26 – Baylee Littrell, singer
- November 30 – Emily Skinner, child actress

=== December ===
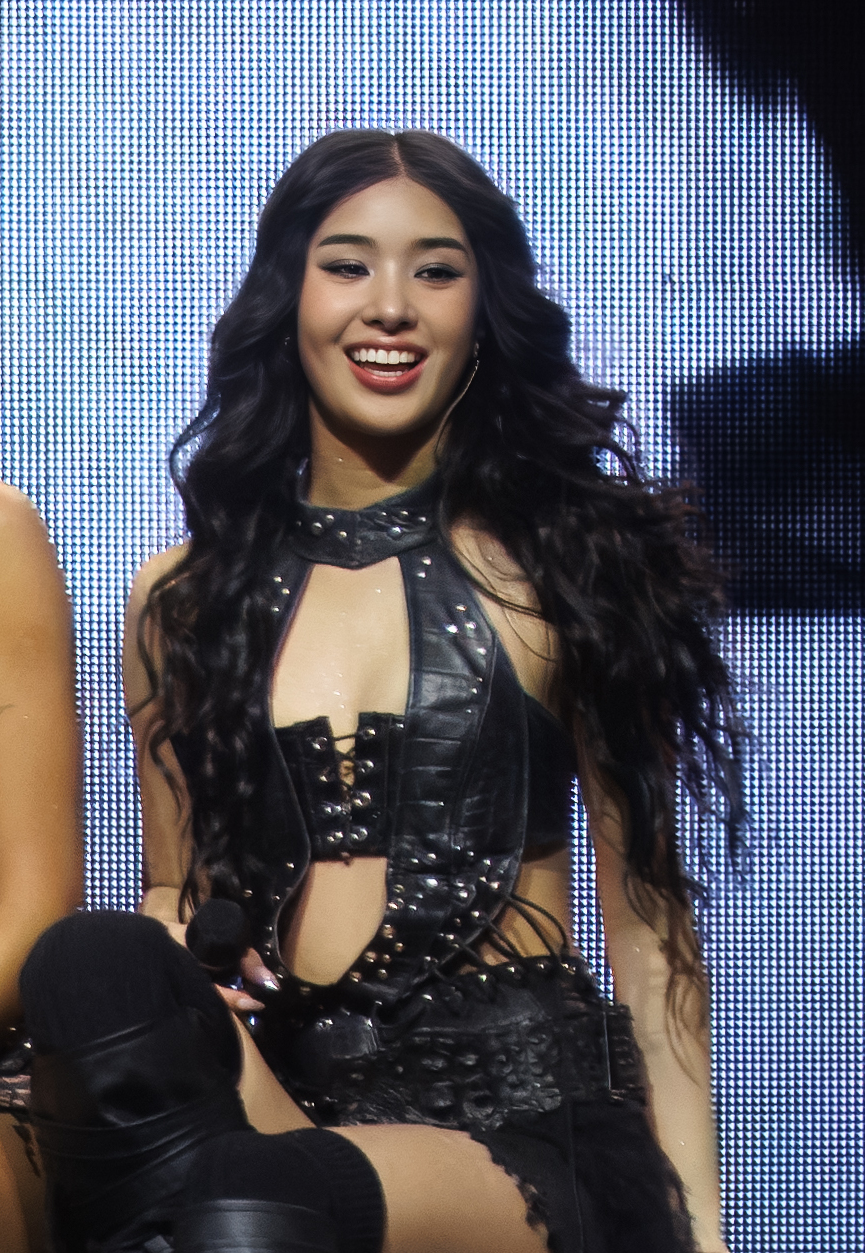
Sophia Laforteza

- December 12 – Allegra Acosta, actress
- December 30 – Bugha, esports athlete
- December 31 – Sophia Laforteza, singer and dancer

== Deaths ==
=== January ===
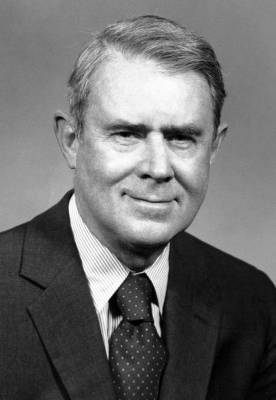
Cyrus Vance

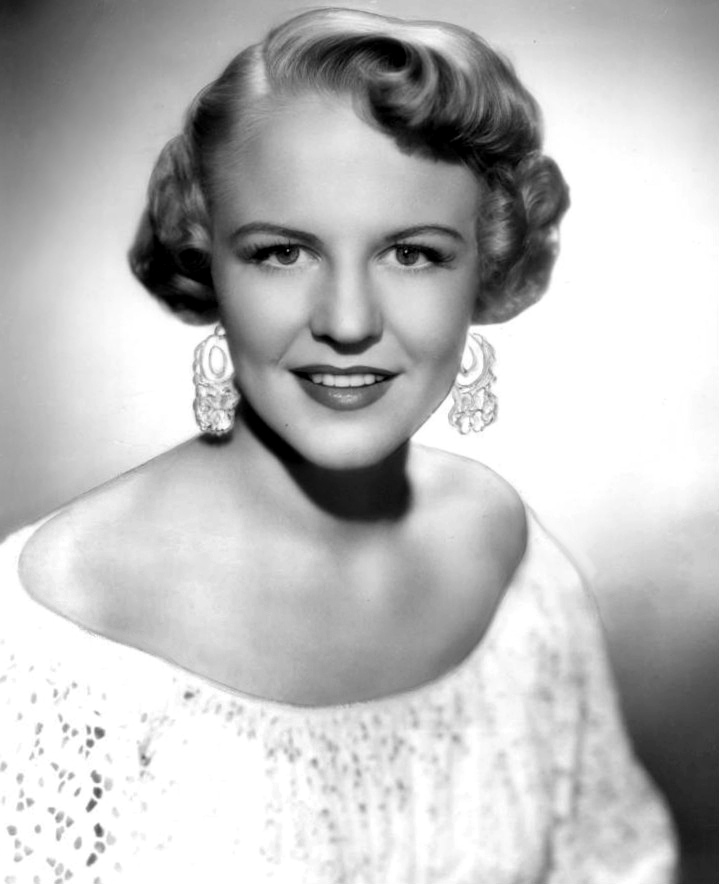
Peggy Lee

- January 1
  - Carol Ohmart, actress (b. 1927)
  - Julia Phillips, movie producer (b. 1944)
- January 3 – Miki Dora, surfer (b. 1934)
- January 4 – Nathan Chapman, soldier (b. 1970)
- January 6 – John W. Reynolds Jr., politician and jurist (b. 1921)
- January 7
  - Mighty Igor, wrestler (b. 1931)
  - Avery Schreiber, actor and comedian (b. 1935)
- January 8 – Dave Thomas, businessman (b. 1932)
- January 9 – K. William Stinson, politician (b. 1930)
- January 10 – John Buscema, comic book artist (b. 1927)
- January 12
  - Ernest Pintoff, animator (b. 1931)
  - Cyrus Vance, lawyer and Secretary of State (b. 1917)
- January 13 – Ted Demme, film and television director and producer (b. 1963)
- January 14 – Edith Bouvier Beale, socialite (b. 1917)
- January 15 – Michael Bilandic, politician, Mayor of Chicago (b. 1923)
- January 16
  - Bobo Olson, boxer (b. 1928)
  - Ron Taylor, actor (b. 1952)
- January 18 – Marilyn Harris, writer (b. 1931)
- January 20 – Carrie Hamilton, actress and daughter of Carol Burnett (b. 1963)
- January 21 – Peggy Lee, singer, songwriter, and actress (b. 1920)
- January 22 –Stanley Marcus, businessman and author (b. 1905)
- January 23 – Robert Nozick, philosopher (b. 1938)
- January 25 – Rudolph B. Davila, Army officer (b. 1916)
- January 28 – Dick "Night Train" Lane, American football player (b. 1928)

=== February ===
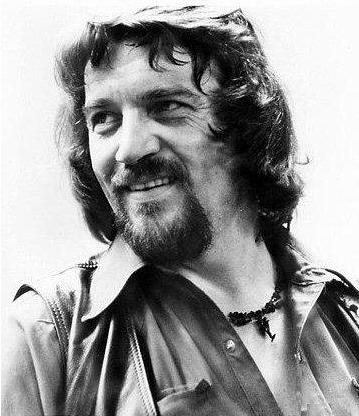
Waylon Jennings

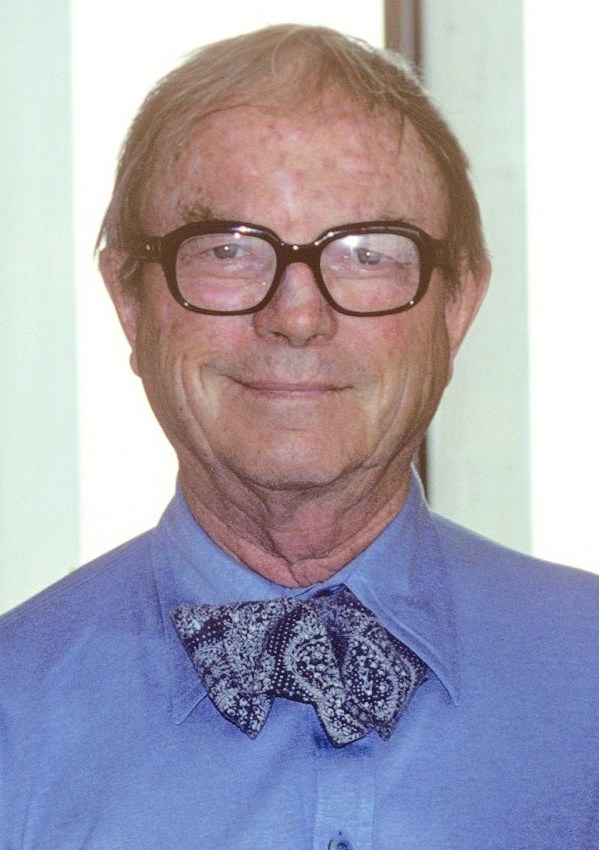
Chuck Jones

- February 1
  - Irish McCalla, actress (b. 1928)
  - Daniel Pearl, journalist and murder victim, died in Karachi, Pakistan (b. 1963)
- February 2 – Paul Baloff, singer (b. 1960)
- February 4 – Helen Dodson Prince, astronomer (b. 1905)
- February 6 – Guy Stockwell, actor (b. 1933)
- February 7
  - Elisa Bridges, actress and model (b. 1973)
  - Ellen Demming, actress (b. 1922)
- February 8 – Nick Brignola, jazz musician (b. 1936)
- February 9 – Fred Gehrke, football player (b. 1918)
- February 10
  - Jim Spencer, baseball player (b. 1947)
  - Dave Van Ronk, folk musician (b. 1936)
  - Vernon A. Walters, Army officer and a diplomat (b. 1917)
- February 11 – George Kasem, politician (b. 1919)
- February 13 – Waylon Jennings, American country singer (b. 1937)
- February 15 – Howard K. Smith, television journalist (b. 1914)
- February 18 – Jack Lambert, actor (b. 1920)
- February 19 – Virginia Hamilton, writer (b. 1936)
- February 20 – Willie Thrower, American football player (b. 1930)
- February 22 – Chuck Jones, animator (b. 1912)
- February 24
  - Leo Ornstein, Russian-born American composer and pianist (b. 1892)
  - Mel Stewart, actor, director, and musician (b. 1929)
- February 26 – Lawrence Tierney, actor (b. 1919)
- February 27 – Mary Stuart, actress (b. 1926)

=== March ===
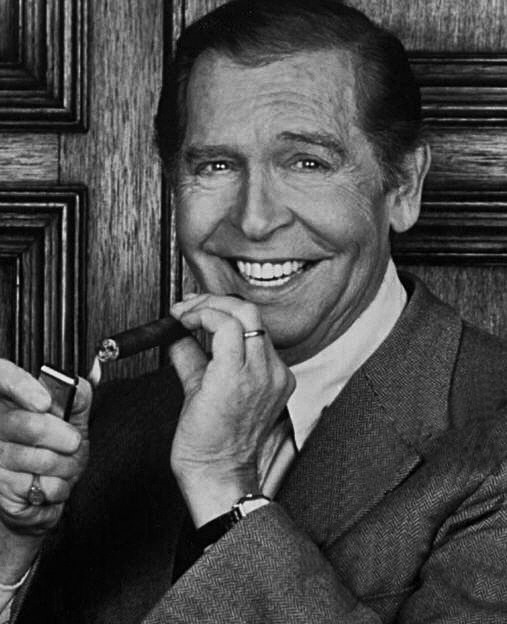
Milton Berle

- March 1 – C. Farris Bryant, politician (b. 1914)
- March 3 – Al Pollard, football player (b. 1928)
- March 5 – Howard Cannon, politician (b. 1912)
- March 7 – Mickey Haslin, baseball player (b. 1909)
- March 9 – Irene Worth, actress (b. 1916)
- March 11 – James Tobin, Nobel economist (b. 1918)
- March 15 – Sylvester Weaver, television executive (b. 1908)
- March 17 – Rosetta LeNoire, actress (b. 1911)
- March 23 – Eileen Farrell, soprano (b. 1920)
- March 26 – Randy Castillo, musician (b. 1950)
- March 27
  - Milton Berle, comedian and actor (b. 1908)
  - Dudley Moore, actor, comedian, and musician (b. 1935)
  - Billy Wilder, Austrian-born director (b. 1905)

=== April ===
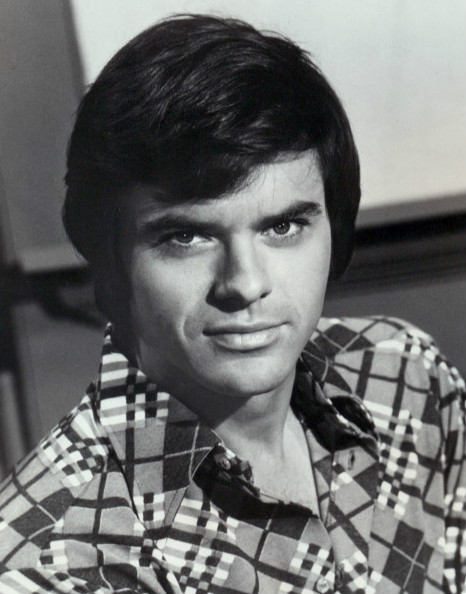
Robert Urich

- April 5 – Layne Staley, singer and songwriter (b. 1967)
- April 7 – John Agar, actor (b. 1921)
- April 14 – Arthur W. Coats Jr., California politician (b. 1914)
- April 15 – Byron White, athlete and Supreme Court Justice (b. 1917)
- April 16 – Robert Urich, actor (b. 1946)
- April 18 – Wahoo McDaniel, American football player and wrestler (b. 1938)
- April 22 – Linda Lovelace, American pornographic actress (b. 1949)
- April 25 – Lisa Lopes, rapper, died in La Ceiba, Atlántida, Honduras (b. 1971)
- April 27
  - George Alec Effinger, writer (b. 1947)
  - Ruth Handler, businesswoman (b. 1916)

=== May ===
- May 9 – Dan Devine, American football player and coach (b. 1924)
- May 6 – Otis Blackwell, songwriter (b. 1931)
- May 11 – Joseph Bonanno, mafioso (b. 1905 in Italy)
- May 16 – Big Dick Dudley, professional wrestler (b. 1968)
- May 17 – Dave Berg, cartoonist (b. 1920)
- May 20 – Stephen Jay Gould, paleontologist and writer (b. 1941)
- May 23 – Sam Snead, golfer (b. 1912)
- May 24
  - Susie Garrett, actress (b. 1929)
  - Wallace Markfield, writer (b. 1926)
- May 26 – John Alexander Moore, zoologist (b. 1915)
- May 28 – David Parker Ray, kidnapper and serial killer (b. 1939)

=== June ===
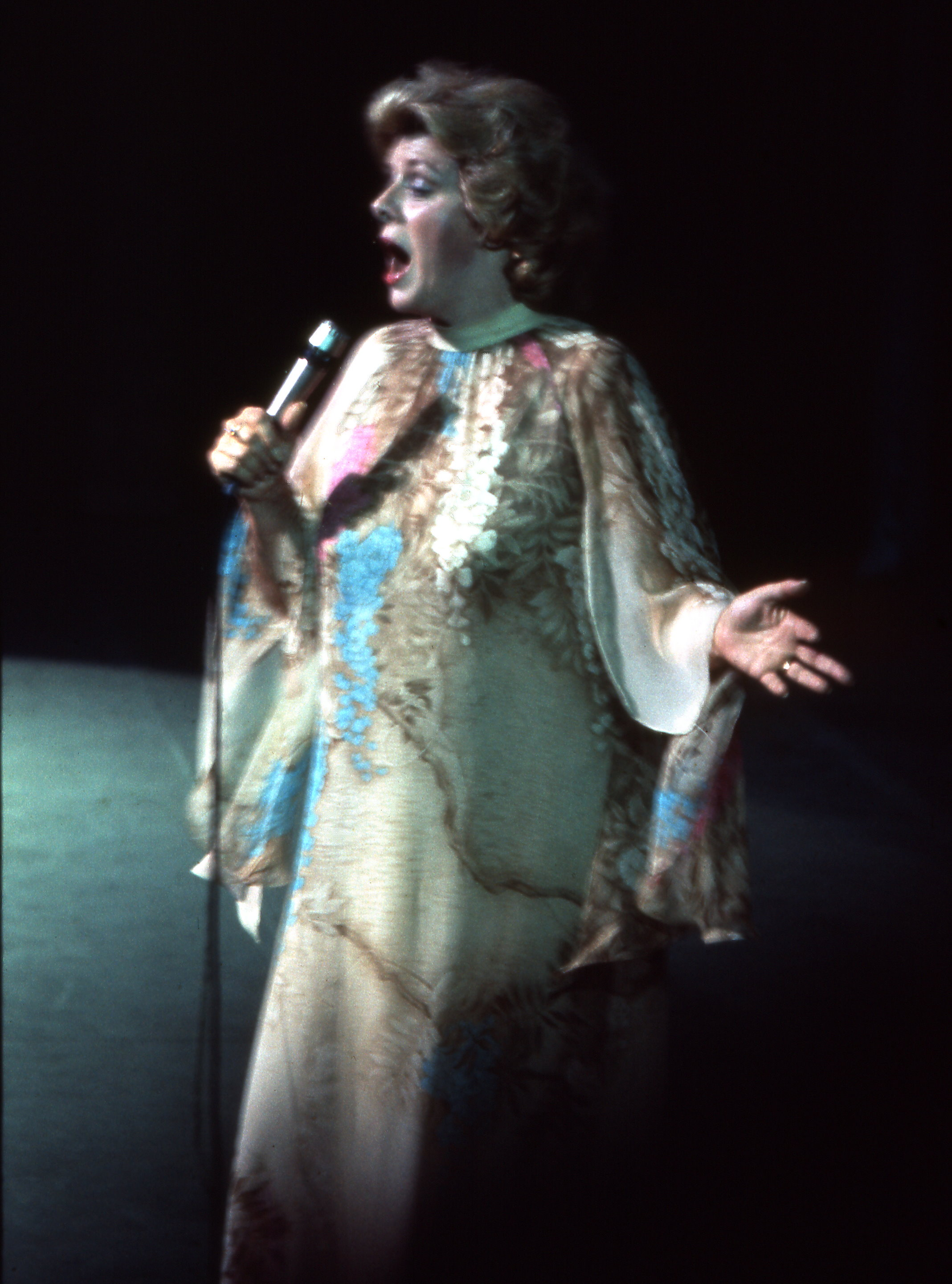
Rosemary Clooney

- June 5 – Dee Dee Ramone, songwriter and musician (b. 1951)
- June 6
  - Robbin Crosby, guitarist (b. 1959)
  - Bill Radovich, American football guard (b. 1915)
- June 10
  - Maury Travis, serial killer (b. 1965)
  - John Gotti, murderer and leader of organized crime (b. 1940)
- June 12 – Bill Blass, fashion designer (b. 1922)
- June 17 – Willie Davenport, track and field athlete (b. 1943)
- June 22
  - Darryl Kile, baseball player (b. 1968)
  - Eppie Lederer, journalist and radio host (b. 1918)
- June 23 – Logan Tucker, murder victim (b. 1996)
- June 26 – Jay Berwanger, American football player (b. 1914)
- June 27
  - John Entwistle, English musician (b. 1944)
  - Ralph Erickson, baseball pitcher (b. 1902)
- June 29 – Rosemary Clooney, singer and actress, wife of José Ferrer and mother of Miguel Ferrer (b, 1928)

=== July ===
- July 2 – Ray Brown, American bassist (b. 1926)
- July 4 – Benjamin O. Davis Jr., general (b. 1912)
- July 5 – Ted Williams, baseball player (b. 1918)
- July 6 – John Frankenheimer, film director (b. 1930)
- July 8 – Ward Kimball, animator (b. 1913)
- July 9 – Rod Steiger, actor and husband of Claire Bloom (b. 1925)
- July 10 – Laurence Janifer, writer (b. 1933)
- July 16 – John Cocke, computer scientist (b. 1925)
- July 19 – Alan Lomax, folklorist and musicologist (b. 1915)
- July 23 – Chaim Potok, writer and rabbi (b. 1929)

=== August ===
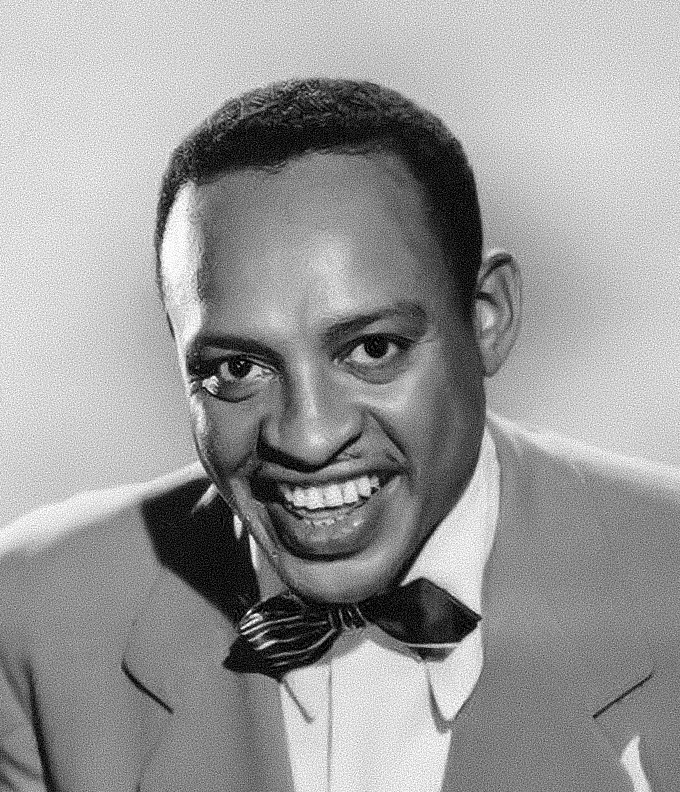
Lionel Hampton

- August 5
  - Josh Ryan Evans, American actor (b. 1982)
  - Chick Hearn, American basketball announcer (b. 1916)
- August 11 – Galen Rowell, American photographer, writer, and climber (b. 1940)
- August 12 – Enos Slaughter, American baseball player (b. 1916)
- August 14 – Dave Williams, American musician (b. 1972)
- August 15 – Kyle Rote, American football player (b. 1928)
- August 16 – Jeff Corey, American actor (b. 1914)
- August 23 – Hoyt Wilhem, baseball player (b. 1922)
- August 31
  - Lionel Hampton, American musician (b. 1908)
  - Martin Kamen, American chemist (b. 1913)

=== September ===
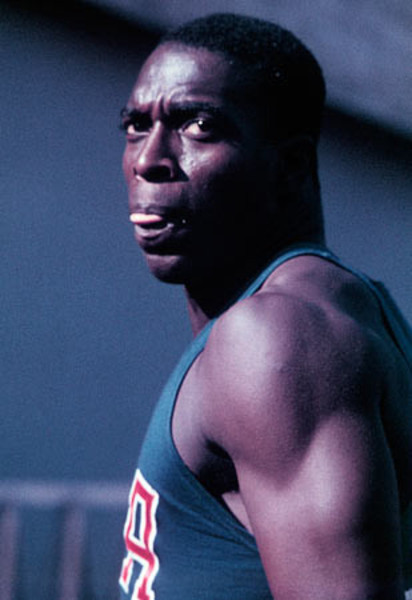
Bob Hayes

- September 3 – Ted Ross, American actor (b. 1934)
- September 4 – Jerome Biffle, American athlete (b. 1928)
- September 5 – David Todd Wilkinson, American cosmologist (b. 1935)
- September 7 – Erma Franklin, American singer (b. 1938)
- September 11
  - Kim Hunter, American actress (b. 1922)
  - Johnny Unitas, American football player (b. 1933)
- September 14
  - LaWanda Page, comedian and actress (b. 1920)
  - Paul Williams, saxophonist (b. 1915)
- September 18 – Bob Hayes, American football player and track and field athlete (b. 1942)
- September 21 – Robert L. Forward, writer, inventor, and physicist (b. 1932)
- September 22 – Mickey Newbury, American singer-songwriter (b. 1940)
- September 24 – Mike Webster, football player (b. 1952)
- September 28 – Whitney Blake, actress and director (b. 1926)

=== October ===
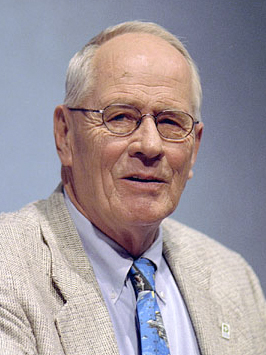
Stephen E. Ambrose

- October 3 – Bruce Paltrow, American television and film director and producer (b. 1943)
- c. October 5 – Jay R. Smith, American actor and comedian (b. 1915)
- October 6 – Ben Eastman, Olympic middle-distance runner (b. 1911)
- October 9 – Aileen Wuornos, American serial killer (b. 1956)
- October 10 – Teresa Graves, American actress and comedian (b. 1948)
- October 12 – Ray Conniff, musician and bandleader (b. 1916)
- October 13 – Stephen Ambrose, American historian and biographer (b. 1936)
- October 17 – Aileen Riggin, American swimmer and diver (b. 1906)
- October 18 – Kam Fong Chun, American actor (b. 1918)
- October 23
  - Adolph Green, American lyricist and playwright (b. 1914)
  - Richard Helms, American CIA director (b. 1913)
- October 24
  - Harry Hay, British-born American activist (b. 1912)
  - Peggy Moran, actress (b. 1918)
- October 25 – Paul Wellstone, American politician (b. 1944)
- October 28 – Margaret Booth, American film editor (b. 1898)
- October 30 – Jam Master Jay, American Hip-Hop DJ (b. 1965)

=== November ===
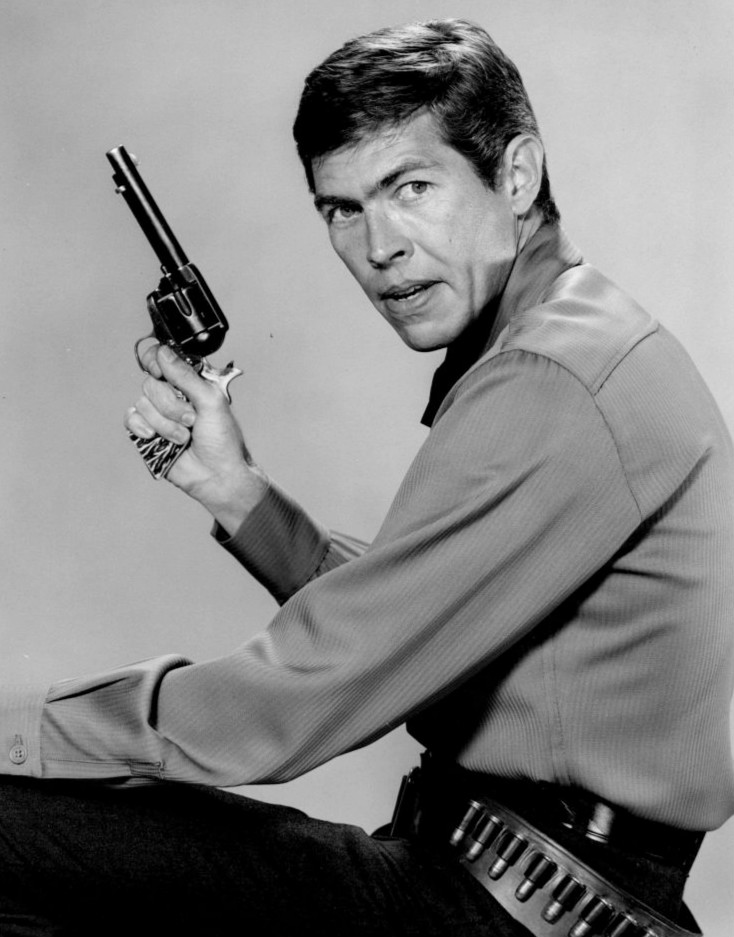
James Coburn

- November 3 – Jonathan Harris, actor (b. 1914)
- November 9 – Merlin Santana, actor (b. 1976)
- November 14 – Eddie Bracken, actor (b. 1915)
- November 15 – Roberta Leighton, drag racer
- November 18 – James Coburn, actor (b. 1928)
- November 21 – Hadda Brooks, jazz singer, pianist, and composer (b. 1916)
- November 24 – John Rawls, philosopher (b. 1921)
- November 27
  - Billie Bird, actress and comedian (b. 1908)
  - Edwin L. Mechem, politician (b. 1912)
- November 26 – Verne Winchell, businessman (b. 1915)

=== December ===
- December 1 – Dave McNally, baseball player (b. 1942)
- December 2 – Mal Waldron, jazz pianist, composer, and arranger (b. 1925)
- December 3
  - Emanuel Papper, anesthesiologist (b. 1915)
  - Glenn Quinn, Irish actor (b. 1970)
- December 5 – Roone Arledge, broadcasting executive (b. 1931)
- December 6
  - Philip Berrigan, priest, member of the Plowshares Movement and political activist (b. 1923)
  - Charles Rosen, pioneer in artificial intelligence (b. 1927)
- December 9 – Stan Rice, painter and poet (b. 1942)
- December 12 – Brad Dexter, actor (b. 1917)
- December 26 – Herb Ritts, photographer (b. 1952)
- December 27 – George Roy Hill, film director (b. 1921)
- December 30 – Mary Brian, actress (b. 1906)
- December 31 – Jerome Beatty, Jr., children's author (b. 1916)

=== Full date unknown ===
- Galen Schlosser, American architect

== See also ==
- 2002 in American soccer
- 2002 in American television
- List of American films of 2002
- Timeline of United States history (1990–2009)
