= Galen Schlosser =

American architect

Galen Schlosser (February 28, 1912 – December 8, 2002) was an architect who lived in the East Falls and Mount Airy areas of Philadelphia, Pennsylvania, US. He received his master's degree in architecture in 1936 from the University of Pennsylvania. He died in 2002 at the age of 90.

While employed by famed architect Louis Kahn, he worked on several projects, including the Kimbell Art Museum, the Salk Institute for Biological Studies and the proposed Dominican Motherhouse of St. Catherine de Ricci.

Schlosser also did independent architectural work, including the design of three residences on Gypsy Lane in East Falls. The wood detailing in Schlosser's Gypsy Lane houses has been discussed in scholarly literature as a possible influence on the wood detailing on some of Kahn's buildings, including the Norman Fisher House, the Esherick House and the Salk Institute.

Schlosser was one of Kahn's acquaintances who provided assistance to the team that organized the Louis I. Kahn Archives under the leadership of Luis Vincent Rivera and G. Holmes Perkins at the University of Pennsylvania after Kahn's death.
