= Arthur W. Coats Jr. =

American politician

Arthur W. Coats Jr. (1914–2002) served in the California legislature and during World War II he served in the United States Army.
