= Murder of Logan Tucker =

American murder victim

Logan Tucker
- Born: Logan Lynn Tucker; April 10, 1996; United States
- Died: June 23, 2002 (aged 6); Woodward, Oklahoma U.S.
- Cause of death: Murder by suffocation
- Mother: Katherine Rutan

Logan Tucker (April 10, 1996 – June 23, 2002) was a six-year-old American boy who became the victim of a murder where no body was found.

== Events prior to murder ==
In 2002, Logan lived with his mother, Katherine Rutan, his four-year-old brother Justin, and his mother's roommate, Melody Lennington. Prior to Logan's disappearance, the Oklahoma Department of Human Services (OKDHS) had taken custody of Logan and Justin after Rutan threatened to harm them. They were returned shortly afterwards. Rutan claimed she had seen Logan playing with matches. She said he was dangerous, and that she was afraid he would hurt his younger brother.

Three days before Logan went missing, Rutan told the OKDHS that she wanted to give up her parental rights to Logan and Justin. OKDHS agreed to take custody of the children and place them in a residential treatment center, but they did not have an opening for several days. Rutan was furious when she found out they would not take Logan immediately.

== Disappearance ==
Melody Lennington, Rutan's roommate, last saw Logan on the evening of June 22, 2002, when she put both children to bed. She said she awoke between 3:00 and 4:00 a.m. to the sound of Logan screaming and crying. She went back to sleep, and at 6:00 a.m., she asked Rutan where Logan was. Rutan said Logan was sick and she had placed him in the basement. Later Rutan said OKDHS had taken Logan away, that he was with his father, or that he was in a psychiatric hospital.

OKDHS did not take Logan and were not scheduled to do so until the next morning. Logan was not at any of the other places Rutan named. Witnesses said after that day, Rutan looked relieved that Logan was gone, and even started selling his clothes and belongings. Logan's grandparents reported him missing on July 7, 2002, after getting evasive answers from Rutan about where Logan was.

== Investigation ==
When authorities searched Rutan and Lennington's apartment, they found blood stains and masking tape with hairs stuck to it in the basement. On August 22, 2002, Logan's brother told FBI agents what happened the night Logan went missing. He said his mother took him and Logan out to the country. Justin said Logan was in the back seat of the car pale and hunched over, but not crying or talking. Justin had also asked Rutan why she needed the plastic she was carrying, and she responded, "to bury Logan."

She then left Justin in the car, taking Logan with her. He said his mother told him to stay in the car because there were snakes out there. Justin said his mother had a shovel and some plastics. She crossed a fence and went out into the field. She later returned without Logan. Logan's body has never been found. He is presumed to have died on the night he went missing. Police believe Rutan buried Logan in the woods or field of Woodward County, or possibly dumped him in Fort Supply Lake.

== Conviction ==
Rutan was convicted of first-degree murder in September 2007, and the jury recommended a sentence of life in prison without the possibility of parole. Rutan was formally sentenced to life without parole in October 2007.

== See also ==
- List of solved missing person cases (post-2000)
