= Kendra and Maliyah Herrin =

Former conjoined twins

- Born: February 26, 2002 (age 24); Salt Lake City, Utah, U.S.
- Parent(s): Jake and Erin Herrin
- Relatives: Courtney Reiley Herrin (sister); Justin Erron Jeffrey Herrin (brother); Austin Jacob Lamar Herrin (brother)

Kendra Deene Herrin and Maliyah Mae Herrin (born February 26, 2002) are former conjoined twins. They were separated in August 2006. They were the first set of conjoined twins to be separated to share a kidney. Kendra retained their shared kidney following the separation surgery, while Maliyah Herrin underwent dialysis until she was transplanted with a kidney donated by her mother in April 2007.

Prior to the separation surgery, medical ethicists in the United States and in Europe discussed whether it was ethical to separate the twins because of the additional risk to Maliyah. Their family and doctors believed separation surgery would give both girls their best chance to live a normal life.

== Early life ==
The twins were born at the University of Utah Medical Center in Salt Lake City, Utah, to Erin and Jake Herrin. They began their lives as conjoined twins of a form termed Ischiopagus (Type D) / Omphalopagus (Type B) conjoined twins, meaning that they were joined at the abdomen and the pelvis; they had between them an abdomen, pelvis, liver, kidney, large intestine and two legs (each twin controlling one leg).

Although separation of most conjoined twins is more likely to be successful at a much earlier age, transplantation of a kidney is not generally possible in children younger than age four. Doctors debated whether they should be separated because of the risk to Maliyah, but their parents and doctors ultimately decided to go forward with the surgery, feeling it gave them their best chance at a normal life. They have been the subject of numerous news articles and have made appearances on television talk shows, including The Oprah Winfrey Show.

== Separation ==
The Herrin twins were approximately four and a half years old when they were separated in an operation that began at 7 a.m. on Monday, August 7, 2006, lasted nearly 18 hours, and involved six surgeons. Surgery on the girls then continued in two separate operations lasting up to eight more hours into the morning of August 8. The twins went home from the hospital to their family on September 17, 2006.

== Kidney transplant ==
Kendra retained the single kidney which the twins had shared. Maliyah immediately began hemodialysis, which continued until April 3, 2007, when she was transplanted with a kidney donated by her mother, Erin. Maliyah was reported to be doing well following the transplant, as was her mother. In 2015, Maliyah's body started to reject the kidney. A few months later, despite intense treatment to slow down the process, it was definite that her kidney wouldn't be able to function for much longer. Maliyah received another kidney transplant in May 2018, which has so far been successful.

== Progress ==
Following their separation surgery, both girls began learning to walk using crutches. Their parents have discussed having them eventually fitted with prosthetic legs. They also get around using wheelchairs or by crawling and pulling themselves up on furniture, according to the family's website. Jake and Erin Herrin's other children include fraternal twin sons and another daughter.

== Book ==
The twins' mother wrote a book in 2009 titled When Hearts Conjoin.
