= 2005 in the United States =

- Decades: 1980s; 1990s; 2000s; 2010s; 2020s
- See also: History of the United States (1991–2016); Timeline of United States history (1990–2009); List of years in the United States

Events from the year 2005 in the United States.

== Incumbents ==
=== Federal government ===
- President: George W. Bush (R-Texas)
- Vice President: Dick Cheney (R-Wyoming)
- Chief Justice:

William Rehnquist (Virginia) (until September 3)
John Roberts (Maryland) (starting September 29)

- Speaker of the House of Representatives: Dennis Hastert (R-Illinois)
- Senate Majority Leader: Bill Frist (R-Tennessee)
- Congress: 108th (until January 3), 109th (starting January 3)

==== State governments ====
Governors and lieutenant governors

=== Governors ===
- Governor of Alabama: Bob Riley (Republican)
- Governor of Alaska: Frank Murkowski (Republican)
- Governor of Arizona: Janet Napolitano (Democratic)
- Governor of Arkansas: Mike Huckabee (Republican)
- Governor of California: Arnold Schwarzenegger (Republican)
- Governor of Colorado: Bill Owens (Republican)
- Governor of Connecticut: Jodi Rell (Republican)
- Governor of Delaware: Ruth Ann Minner (Democratic)
- Governor of Florida: Jeb Bush (Republican)
- Governor of Georgia: Sonny Perdue (Republican)
- Governor of Hawaii: Linda Lingle (Republican)
- Governor of Idaho: Dirk Kempthorne (Republican)
- Governor of Illinois: Rod Blagojevich (Democratic)
- Governor of Indiana: Joe Kernan (Democratic) (until January 10), Mitch Daniels (Republican) (starting January 10)
- Governor of Iowa: Tom Vilsack (Democratic)
- Governor of Kansas: Kathleen Sebelius (Democratic)
- Governor of Kentucky: Ernie Fletcher (Republican)
- Governor of Louisiana: Kathleen Blanco (Democratic)
- Governor of Maine: John Baldacci (Democratic)
- Governor of Maryland: Robert L. Ehrlich Jr. (Republican)
- Governor of Massachusetts: Mitt Romney (Republican)
- Governor of Michigan: Jennifer Granholm (Democratic)
- Governor of Minnesota: Tim Pawlenty (Republican)
- Governor of Mississippi: Haley Barbour (Republican)
- Governor of Missouri: Bob Holden (Democratic) (until January 10), Matt Blunt (Republican) (starting January 10)
- Governor of Montana: Judy Martz (Republican) (until January 3), Brian Schweitzer (Democratic) (starting January 3)
- Governor of Nebraska: Mike Johanns (Republican) (until January 20), Dave Heineman (Republican) (starting January 20)
- Governor of Nevada: Kenny Guinn (Republican)
- Governor of New Hampshire: Craig Benson (Republican) (until January 6), John Lynch (Democratic) (starting January 6)
- Governor of New Jersey: Richard Codey (Democratic)
- Governor of New Mexico: Bill Richardson (Democratic)
- Governor of New York: George Pataki (Republican)
- Governor of North Carolina: Mike Easley (Democratic)
- Governor of North Dakota: John Hoeven (Republican)
- Governor of Ohio: Bob Taft (Republican)
- Governor of Oklahoma: Brad Henry (Democratic)
- Governor of Oregon: Ted Kulongoski (Democratic)
- Governor of Pennsylvania: Ed Rendell (Democratic)
- Governor of Rhode Island: Donald Carcieri (Republican)
- Governor of South Carolina: Mark Sanford (Republican)
- Governor of South Dakota: Mike Rounds (Republican)
- Governor of Tennessee: Phil Bredesen (Democratic)
- Governor of Texas: Rick Perry (Republican)
- Governor of Utah: Olene S. Walker (Republican) (until January 3), Jon Huntsman Jr. (Republican) (starting January 3)
- Governor of Vermont: Jim Douglas (Republican)
- Governor of Virginia: Mark Warner (Democratic)
- Governor of Washington: Gary Locke (Democratic) (until January 12), Christine Gregoire (Democratic) (starting January 12)
- Governor of West Virginia: Bob Wise (Democratic) (until January 17), Joe Manchin (Democratic) (starting January 17)
- Governor of Wisconsin: Jim Doyle (Democratic)
- Governor of Wyoming: Dave Freudenthal (Democratic)

=== Lieutenant governors ===
- Lieutenant Governor of Alabama: Lucy Baxley (Democratic)
- Lieutenant Governor of Alaska: Loren Leman (Republican)
- Lieutenant Governor of Arkansas: Winthrop Paul Rockefeller (Republican)
- Lieutenant Governor of California: Cruz Bustamante (Democratic)
- Lieutenant Governor of Colorado: Jane Norton (Republican)
- Lieutenant Governor of Connecticut: Kevin B. Sullivan (Democratic)
- Lieutenant Governor of Delaware: John Carney (Democratic)
- Lieutenant Governor of Florida: Toni Jennings (Republican)
- Lieutenant Governor of Georgia: Mark Taylor (Democratic)
- Lieutenant Governor of Hawaii: Duke Aiona (Republican)
- Lieutenant Governor of Idaho: Jim Risch (Republican)
- Lieutenant Governor of Illinois: Pat Quinn (Democratic)
- Lieutenant Governor of Indiana: Kathy Davis (Democratic) (until January 10), Becky Skillman (Republican) (starting January 10)
- Lieutenant Governor of Iowa: Sally Pederson (Democratic)
- Lieutenant Governor of Kansas: John E. Moore (Democratic)
- Lieutenant Governor of Kentucky: Steve Pence (Republican)
- Lieutenant Governor of Louisiana: Mitch Landrieu (Democratic)
- Lieutenant Governor of Maryland: Michael Steele (Republican)
- Lieutenant Governor of Massachusetts: Kerry Healey (Republican)
- Lieutenant Governor of Michigan: John D. Cherry (Democratic)
- Lieutenant Governor of Minnesota: Carol Molnau (Republican)
- Lieutenant Governor of Mississippi: Amy Tuck (Republican)
- Lieutenant Governor of Missouri: Joe Maxwell (Democratic) (until January 10), Peter Kinder (Republican) (starting January 10)
- Lieutenant Governor of Montana: Karl Ohs (Republican) (until January 3), John Bohlinger (Republican) (starting January 3)
- Lieutenant Governor of Nebraska:
  - until January 20: Dave Heineman (Republican)
  - January 20-24: vacant
  - starting January 24: Rick Sheehy (Republican)
- Lieutenant Governor of Nevada: Lorraine Hunt (Republican)
- Lieutenant Governor of New Mexico: Diane Denish (Democratic)
- Lieutenant Governor of New York: Mary Donohue (Republican)
- Lieutenant Governor of North Carolina: Bev Perdue (Democratic)
- Lieutenant Governor of North Dakota: Jack Dalrymple (Republican)
- Lieutenant Governor of Ohio: Jennette Bradley (Republican) (until January 5), Bruce E. Johnson (Republican) (starting January 5)
- Lieutenant Governor of Oklahoma: Mary Fallin (Republican)
- Lieutenant Governor of Pennsylvania: Catherine Baker Knoll (Democratic)
- Lieutenant Governor of Rhode Island: Charles J. Fogarty (Democratic)
- Lieutenant Governor of South Carolina: André Bauer (Republican)
- Lieutenant Governor of South Dakota: Dennis Daugaard (Republican)
- Lieutenant Governor of Tennessee: John S. Wilder (Democratic)
- Lieutenant Governor of Texas: David Dewhurst (Republican)
- Lieutenant Governor of Utah: Gayle McKeachnie (Republican) (until January 3), Gary Herbert (Republican) (starting January 3)
- Lieutenant Governor of Vermont: Brian Dubie (Republican)
- Lieutenant Governor of Virginia: Tim Kaine (Democratic)
- Lieutenant Governor of Washington: Brad Owen (Democratic)
- Lieutenant Governor of Wisconsin: Barbara Lawton (Democratic)

== Events ==
=== January ===
January 20: George W. Bush, the 43rd president of the United States, begins his second term.

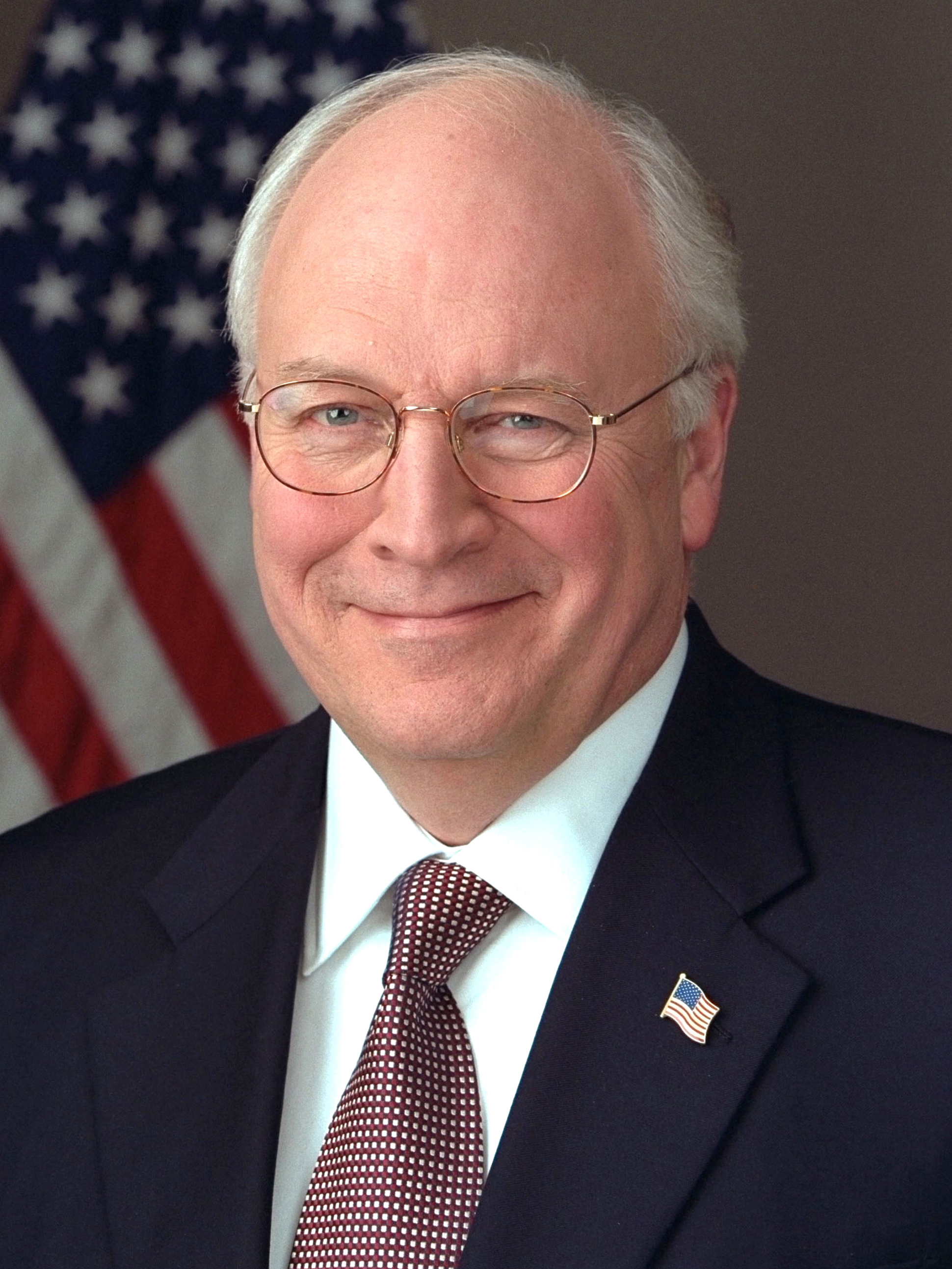
January 20: Dick Cheney, the 46th vice president of the United States, begins his second term.

- January 1 – President George W. Bush delivers a radio address on the Indian Ocean tsunami relief efforts.
- January 3 – President George W. Bush is joined by former Presidents George H. W. Bush and Bill Clinton in the Roosevelt Room as he announces that the two former presidents will be involved with the humanitarian response to the tsunami across the region of South and Southeast Asia.
- January 6 – The US Congress certifies the victory of President George W. Bush and Vice President Dick Cheney despite the objection of Ohio's electoral votes by Ohio congresswoman Stephanie Tubbs Jones and California senator Barbara Boxer. It was the first objection to a state's electoral votes since 1969.
- January 12 – Deep Impact is launched from Cape Canaveral by a Delta II rocket.
- January 20 – President George W. Bush and Vice President Dick Cheney begin their second term.
- January 22 – FoxBox, Fox's Saturday morning programming block owned by 4Kids Entertainment, is rebranded as 4Kids TV.
- January 26 – Glendale train crash: Two trains derail in Glendale, California, killing 11 and injuring 200.
- January 30 – World Wrestling Entertainment holds its Royal Rumble pay-per-view event from the Save Mart Center in Fresno, California.
- January – Mosdeux, a deaf owned film studio is established.

=== February ===
- February 2 – State of the Union Address.
- February 6
  - Super Bowl XXXIX: The New England Patriots win their second consecutive Super Bowl title, defeating the Philadelphia Eagles by a score of 24–21 at Alltel Stadium in Jacksonville.
  - American Dad! debuts on FOX, right after Super Bowl XXXIX.
- February 10 – North Korea announces that it possesses nuclear weapons as a protection against the hostility it feels from the United States.
- February 14 – The Internet site YouTube goes online.
- February 16 – The Kyoto Protocol goes into effect, without the support of the United States and Australia.
- February 20 – World Wrestling Entertainment holds its No Way Out pay-per-view event from the Mellon Arena in Pittsburgh, Pennsylvania.
- February 21 – Avatar: The Last Airbender premieres on Nickelodeon.
- February 24 – David Hernandez Arroyo goes on a shooting rampage at the Smith County Courthouse in Tyler, Texas. He kills two, including his ex-wife, and injures four people, before being killed in a police chase.
- February 25 – Wichita, Kansas police apprehend the "BTK" serial killer Dennis Rader, 31 years after his first murder.
- February 27 – The 77th Academy Awards, hosted by Chris Rock, are held at Kodak Theatre in Hollywood, with Clint Eastwood's Million Dollar Baby winning Best Picture and Best Director, Eastwood's second win for both. Martin Scorsese's The Aviator wins five awards out of 11 nominations. The telecast garners over 42.1 million viewers.

=== March ===
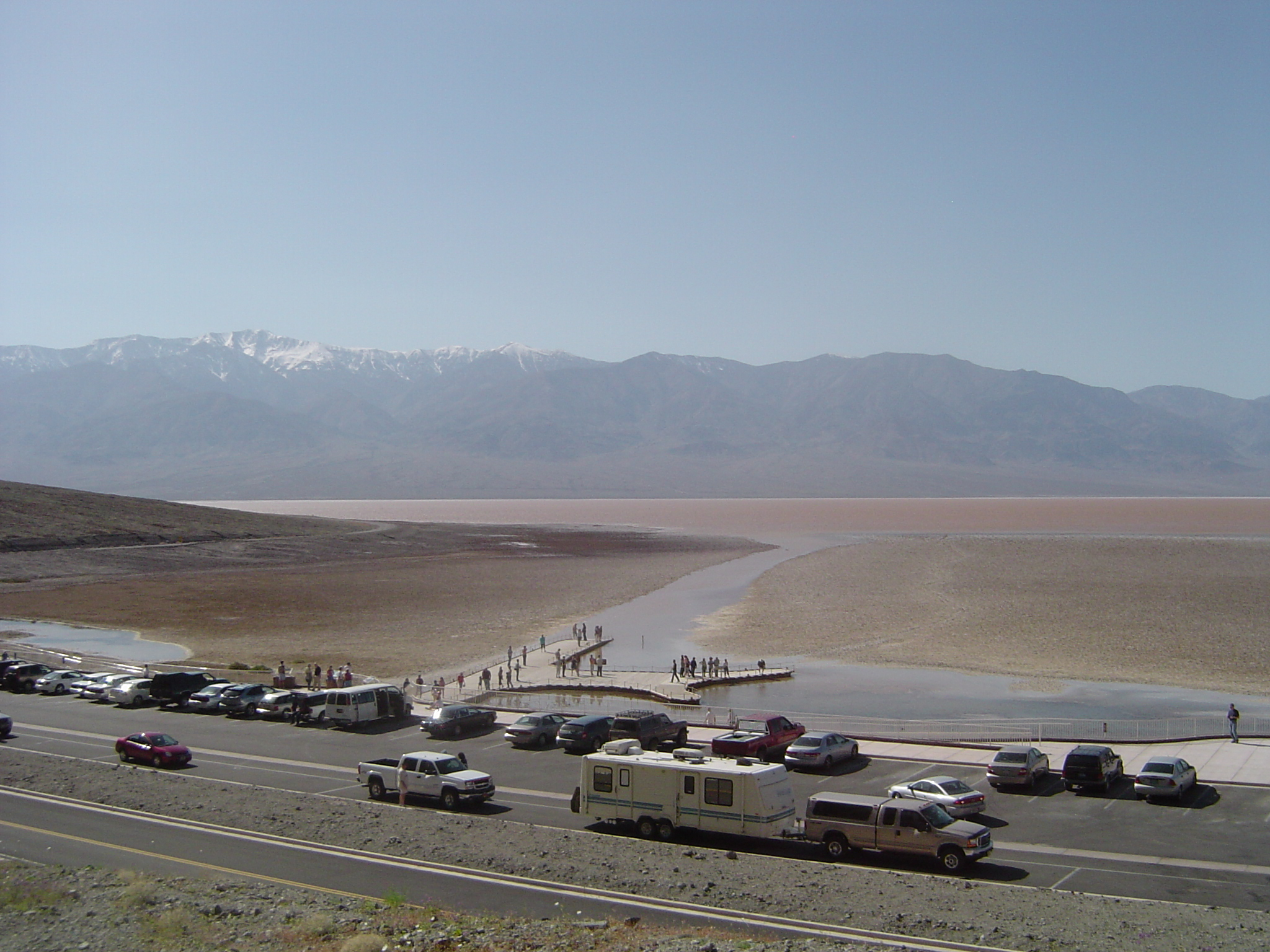
March 15: Unusually high precipitation in the winter of 2005 caused an ephemeral lake to occur in the Badwater Basin of Death Valley National Park.

- March 1 – Roper v. Simmons: The Supreme Court of the United States rules that the death penalty is unconstitutional for juveniles who committed their crimes before the age of 18.
- March 4 – The car of released Italian hostage Giuliana Sgrena is fired on by U.S. soldiers in Iraq, causing the death of one passenger and injuring two more.
- March 11 – Three people, including a judge, are murdered in the Fulton County Courthouse in Atlanta, Georgia; the main suspect, Brian Nichols, surrenders to police the next day.
- March 12 – Terry Ratzmann opens fire during a church sermon in New Berlin, Wisconsin, killing seven and injuring four before taking his own life.
- March 21 – Ten are killed in the Red Lake shootings in Minnesota by teenager Jeff Weise, who commits suicide after a shootout with police. It is the worst school shooting since the Columbine High School massacre.
- March 23 – The United States' 11th Circuit Court of Appeals refuses (by a vote of 2–1) to stop the euthanasia of Terri Schiavo, who has been in a vegetative state since 1990, by not ordering the reinsertion of her feeding tube.
- March 24 – The Office debuts on NBC.
- March 31 – Terri Schiavo dies at the age of 41 in Pinellas Park, Florida.
- Monsters of Rock band is formed in California.

=== April ===
- April 3 – World Wrestling Entertainment holds WrestleMania 21 at the Staples Center in Los Angeles, California.
- April 8 – Fever Pitch, a film starring Jimmy Fallon and Drew Barrymore documenting the Boston Red Sox 2004 World Series run, is released.
- April 9 – Tens of thousands of demonstrators, many of them supporters of Shia cleric Moqtada Sadr, march through Baghdad denouncing the U.S. occupation of Iraq, two years after the fall of Saddam Hussein, and rally in the square where his statue was toppled in 2003.
- April 30 – Newsweek alleges that American interrogators and guards have desecrated the Qur'an in attempts to rattle Islamic detainees.

=== May ===
- May 1 – World Wrestling Entertainment holds its Backlash pay-per-view event from the Verizon Wireless Arena in Manchester, New Hampshire.
- May 8 – Two Denver Police Department officers are shot by a Mexican national, leading to an international incident over the extradition of the shooter.
- May 10 – A hand grenade ostensibly thrown by Vladimir Arutinian lands about 100 feet (30 m) from United States President George W. Bush while he is giving a speech to a crowd in Tbilisi, Georgia, but the explosive malfunctions and does not detonate.
- May 13
  - The United States Department of Defense issues a list of bases to be closed as part of the Base Realignment and Closure process (BRAC 2005).
  - Serial killer Michael Bruce Ross becomes the first person executed in New England in 45 years.
- May 16 – George Galloway appears before a United States Senate committee to answer allegations of making money from the Iraqi Oil-for-Food Programme.
- May 19 – Star Wars: Episode III – Revenge of the Sith is released in theaters.
- May 21 – Kingda Ka at Six Flags Great Adventure opens to the public, becoming the fastest and tallest roller coaster in the world at the time.
- May 22 – World Wrestling Entertainment holds its Judgment Day pay-per-view event from the Target Center in Minneapolis, Minnesota.
- May 25 – Carrie Underwood wins season 4 of American Idol
- May 27 – Madagascar is released in theaters.
- May 31 – W. Mark Felt reveals himself to be the Watergate scandal whistleblower called "Deep Throat."

=== June ===
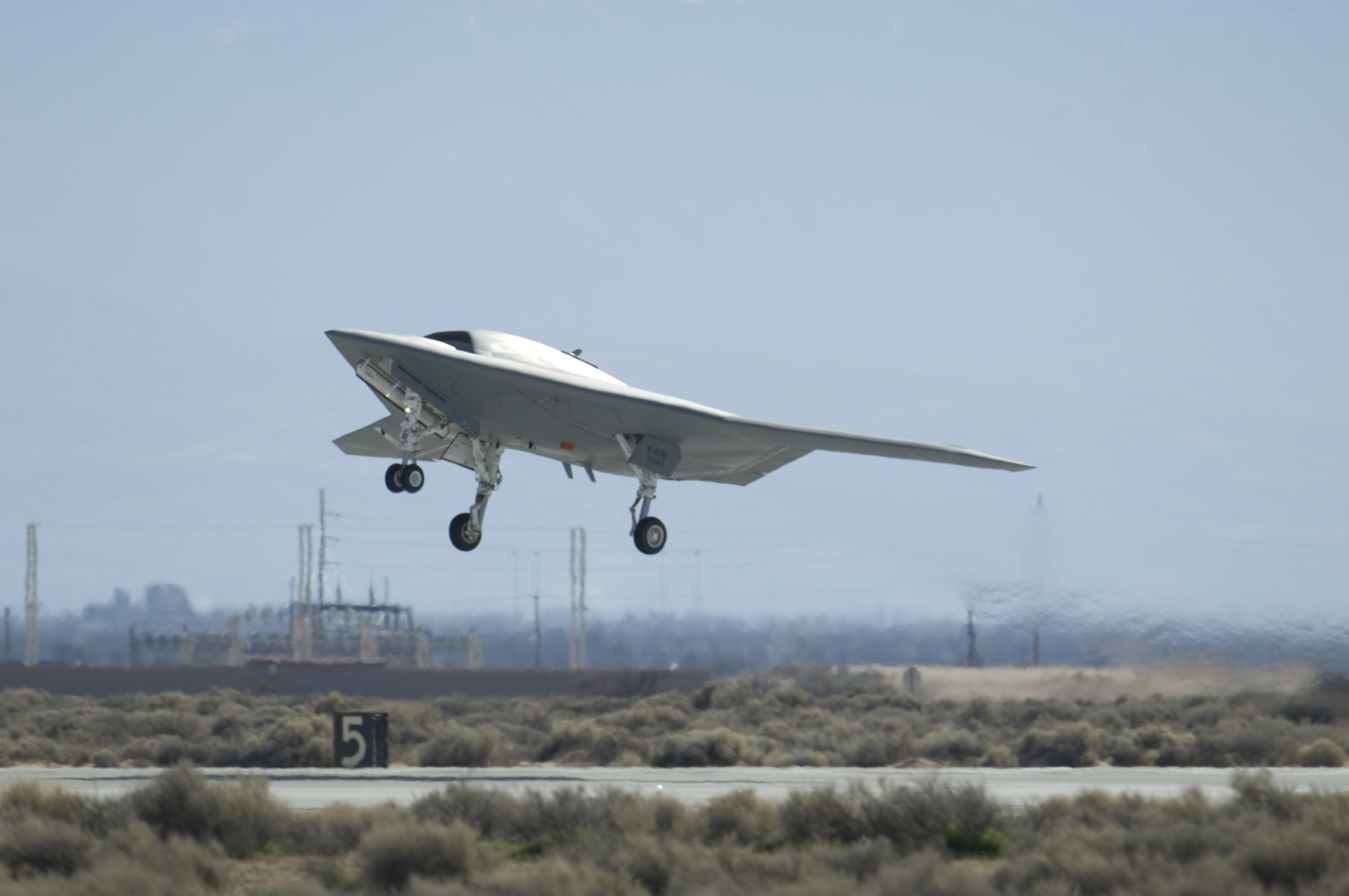
June 2: The Northrop Grumman X–47B unmanned combat air vehicle (UCAV)

- June 2 – The construction of Northrop Grumman X–47B, the world's first unmanned surveillance attack aircraft that can operate from both land bases and aircraft carriers, begins.
- June 9 – The PC game of the hit 2004 video game Grand Theft Auto: San Andreas was released, though data mining was also discovered by players when one player found hidden source files containing a sexually explicit minigame mod, which was later dubbed as "Hot Coffee". Government lawsuits and product recall ensued after the mod became public, while developers Take-Two Interactive and Rockstar Games briefly raised the game's rating from "Mature" to "Adults Only" while working on a patch to remove the code from the files.
- June 12 – World Wrestling Entertainment holds its ECW One Night Stand pay-per-view event from the Hammerstein Ballroom in New York City, New York.
- June 13 – Michael Jackson is found not guilty of child molestation.
- June 17 – Because of "quadruple-witching" options and futures expiration, the New York Stock Exchange sees the heaviest first-hour trading on record. 704 million shares are traded between 9:30–10:30 a.m. (1.92 billion shares for the day).
- June 23
  - The social news site Reddit launches.
  - The San Antonio Spurs win their third NBA Championship after defeating the Detroit Pistons, 81-74, in Game 7 of the 2005 NBA Finals.
- June 24 – A Volna booster rocket carrying the first light sail spacecraft (a joint Russian-United States project) fails 83 seconds after its launch, destroying the spacecraft.
- June 26 – World Wrestling Entertainment holds its Vengeance pay-per-view event from the Thomas & Mack Center in Las Vegas, Nevada.
- June 30 – The Dominican Republic–Central America Free Trade Agreement (CAFTA) is passed by the United States.

=== July ===
- July 4
  - The Italy–USA Foundation is established in Rome, Italy.
  - NASA's "Copper bullet" from the Deep Impact spacecraft hits Comet Tempel 1, creating a crater for scientific studies.
- July 8 – Fantastic Four, directed by Tim Story, is released as the first film in the Fantastic Four film series.
- July 10 – Hurricane Dennis strikes near Navarre Beach, Florida as a Category 3 storm. The storm kills 88 people and causes $4 billion in damages.
- July 19 – President Bush nominates John Roberts to the U.S. Supreme Court to fill a vacancy that would be left by the resignation of Justice Sandra Day O'Connor.
- July 24
  - World Wrestling Entertainment holds its The Great American Bash pay-per-view event from the HSBC Arena in Buffalo, New York.
  - Lance Armstrong wins a record 7th straight Tour de France before his scheduled retirement. In 2012 he will be disqualified from each of those races and banned from cycling for life for doping offenses by the United States Anti-Doping Agency (USADA).
- July 26 – STS–114 launches as the first "Return to Flight" Space Shuttle mission following the Space Shuttle Columbia disaster in 2003.

=== August ===
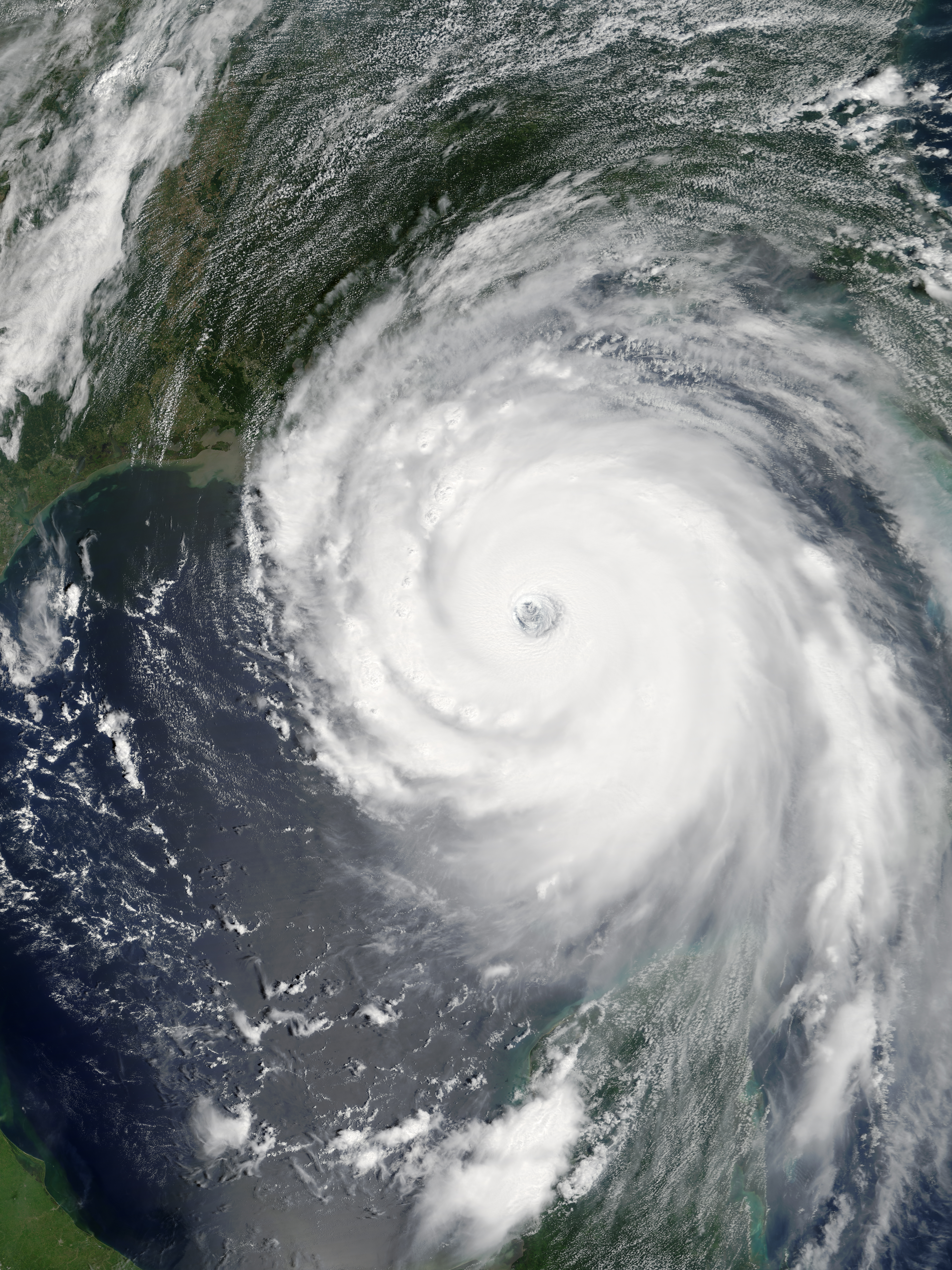
August 29: Hurricane Katrina hits the Gulf Coast

- August 2 – The Dominican Republic–Central America Free Trade Agreement (CAFTA) is signed into law in the United States.
- August 4 – It's Always Sunny in Philadelphia premieres on FX.
- August 9 – Space Shuttle Discovery returns to Edwards Air Force Base at 0814 EDT, completing STS–114, "Return to Flight".
- August 12 – The Mars Reconnaissance Orbiter is launched.
- August 21 – World Wrestling Entertainment holds its SummerSlam event from the MCI Center in Washington, D.C.
- August 23 – Hurricane Katrina forms over the Bahamas.
- August 29– At least 1,836 are killed, and severe damage is caused along the U.S. Gulf Coast, as Hurricane Katrina strikes coastal areas from Louisiana to Alabama, and travels up the entire state of Mississippi (flooding coast 31 feet (9.4 m)), affecting most of eastern North America. Katrina becomes the costliest hurricane in U.S. history with $108 billion in damages. The New Orleans Saints football team will play their entire 2005 season on the road due to the effects of the hurricane.

=== September ===
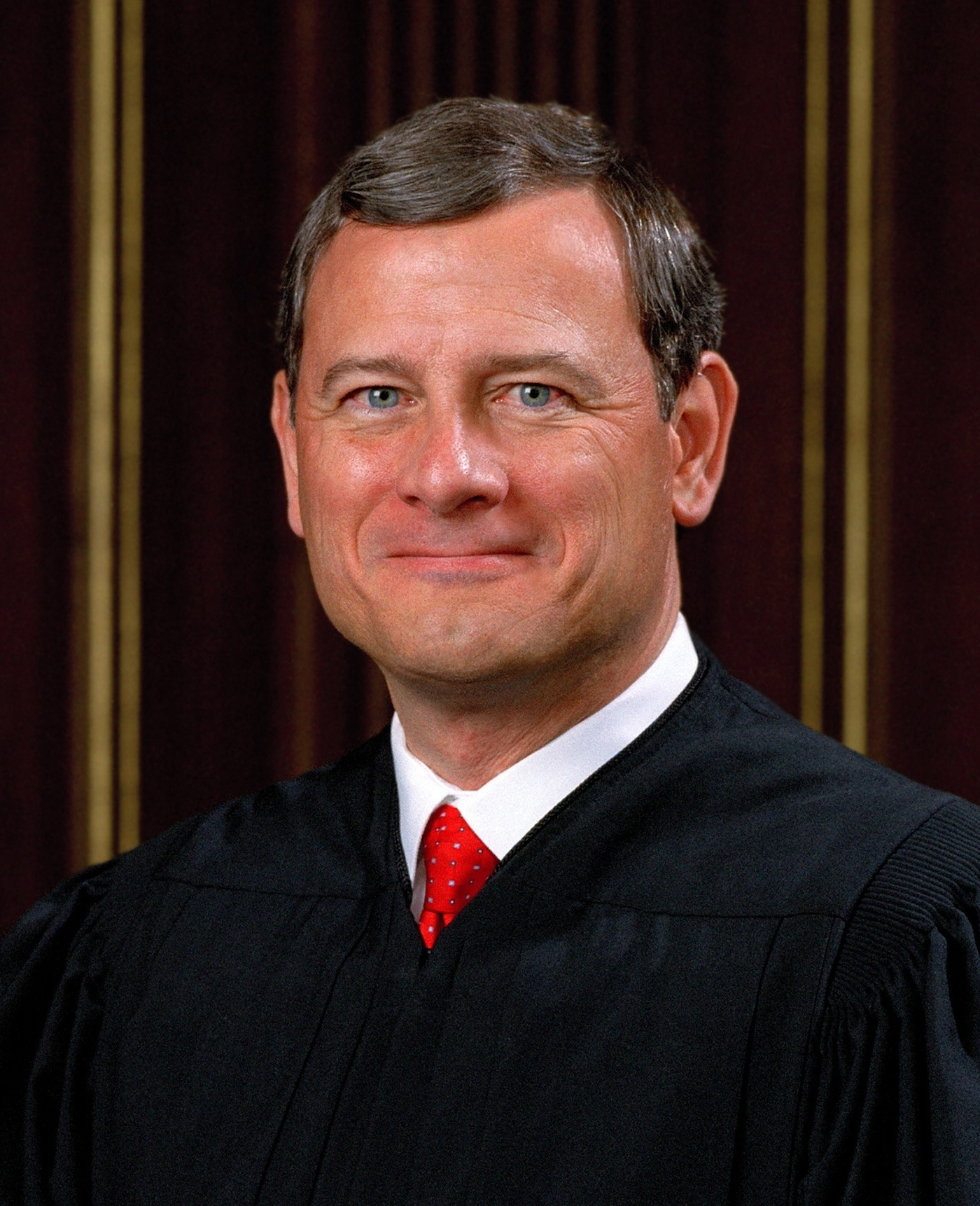
September 29: John Roberts, 17th Chief Justice of the United States.

- September – The largest evacuation in Houston history takes place as millions evacuate from Hurricane Rita.
- September 1 – Oil prices rise sharply following the economic effects of Hurricane Katrina.
- September 3 – Chief Justice William Rehnquist dies at 80 of anaplastic thyroid cancer, creating a vacancy on the Supreme Court.
- September 5 – John Roberts is nominated by President George W. Bush for Chief Justice of the United States, replacing William Rehnquist, who had died two days previously. Roberts was previously nominated to fill the seat of retiring Justice Sandra Day O'Connor, but given the circumstances of Rehnquist's death, O'Connor remains on the Court until her successor is confirmed.
- September 14–16 – The largest UN World Summit in history is held in New York City.
- September 18 – World Wrestling Entertainment holds its Unforgiven pay-per-view event from the Ford Center in Oklahoma City, Oklahoma.
- September 20 – The NFL sees the groundbreaking ceremony for two new stadiums, the Indianapolis Colts' Lucas Oil Stadium ($720 million) and the Dallas Cowboys' temporarily named Cowboys Stadium ($1.15 billion).
- September 23 – Convicted bank thief and Boricua Popular Army leader, Filiberto Ojeda Ríos, is killed in his home in Hormigueros, Puerto Rico when members of the FBI attempt to serve an arrest warrant.
- September 24
  - Worldwide protests occur against the Iraq War, with over 150,000 protesters in Washington, D.C. (see Opposition to the Iraq War).
  - Hurricane Rita hits the U.S. Gulf Coast, devastating areas near Beaumont, Texas and Lake Charles, Louisiana. The Ninth Ward of New Orleans re-floods since Katrina, and Mississippi and Alabama are also affected. The storm kills 120 people and causes $12 billion in damages.
- September 26
  - U.S. Army Reservist Lynndie England is convicted by a military jury on six of seven counts in connection with the Abu Ghraib prisoner abuse scandal.
  - Sprout (now Universal Kids) is launched by a joint venture between PBS, Comcast, HIT Entertainment, and Sesame Workshop. The new network replaces PBS Kids, allowing for an initial reach of 16.5 million subscribers.
  - DT Racer is released on the PlayStation 2, developed by Axis Entertainment and published by XS Games.
- September 28 – United States House Majority Leader Tom DeLay (R–Texas) is indicted on charges of criminal conspiracy by a Texas grand jury.
- September 29 – John Roberts is confirmed and sworn in as the 17th Chief Justice of the United States.

=== October ===
- October 1
  - An Australian photojournalist in Afghanistan, Stephen Dupont, films U.S. soldiers burning two dead Taliban militias' bodies.
  - The United States housing bubble begins to burst, causing home prices to stop rising unexpectedly and begin to decline.
- October 2
  - The first regular-season NFL game played outside of the United States pits the San Francisco 49ers against the Arizona Cardinals at Estadio Azteca in Mexico City, Mexico. The Cardinals win by a score of 31–14.
  - A tour boat capsizes on Lake George, New York killing 20 of 47 aboard.
- October 3
  - U.S. President George W. Bush nominates Harriet Miers to replace Associate Justice Sandra Day O'Connor.
  - St. Tammany Parish schools reopen in Louisiana, just over a month after Hurricane Katrina.
- October 9 – World Wrestling Entertainment holds its No Mercy pay-per-view event from the Toyota Center in Houston, Texas.
- October 15
  - In college football, the USC Trojans narrowly defeat heavy underdogs Notre Dame Fighting Irish in an illegal play known as the Bush Push.
  - A riot occurs in Toledo, Ohio during a neo-Nazi rally on racial issues; 114 are arrested.
- October 16 – U.S. helicopters and warplanes bomb two villages near Ramadi in western Iraq, killing about 70 people.
- October 19 – The Houston Astros win their first National League Championship by defeating the St. Louis Cardinals in seven games, advancing to their first World Series in franchise history.
- October 24
  - Hurricane Wilma makes landfall in southwestern Florida as a Category 3 hurricane. There are 23 direct dead, 39 indirect dead and $29.1 billion in damages.
  - Civil rights activist Rosa Parks, who made headlines when she refused to give up her seat in a Montgomery bus, dies of natural causes at the age of 92 in Detroit. She becomes the first woman to lie in honor in the United States Capitol rotunda.
- October 25 – The Chicago White Sox defeat the Houston Astros 7–5 in 14 innings in the first World Series game in the State of Texas to extend their lead to 3–0, putting them within one win of the Series. The game, which takes 5 hours and 41 minutes to complete, is the longest postseason game by time.
- October 26
  - The Chicago White Sox beat the Houston Astros in four games to win their first World Series since 1917.
  - The U.S. death toll in Iraq reaches 2,000.
- October 27 – After issues arise of her competency to adjudicate United States constitutional law, Harriet Miers withdraws her name from consideration for the Supreme Court of the United States.
- October 28 – Vice presidential adviser Lewis "Scooter" Libby resigns after being charged with obstruction of justice, perjury and making a false statement in the CIA leak investigation.
- October 31
  - U.S. President George W. Bush nominates federal appeals court judge Samuel Alito for Associate Justice of the Supreme Court of the United States.
  - Astronomers announce the discovery of two additional moons orbiting the Pluto/Charon system. Subsequently, named Nix and Hydra, the moons have been found in images from the Hubble Space Telescope.

=== November ===
- November 1
  - United States Senate Minority Leader Harry Reid and his fellow Democrats force a closed session of the Senate over the Lewis Libby indictment.
  - The Prince of Wales and the Duchess of Cornwall (Charles and Camilla) arrive in the United States for a state visit, their first overseas tour since their marriage.
  - World Wrestling Entertainment holds its Taboo Tuesday pay-per-view event from the iPayOne Center in San Diego, California.
- November 4
  - The U.S. and Uruguay governments sign a Bilateral Investment Treaty.
  - Walt Disney Pictures' 46th feature film, Chicken Little, Disney's first fully computer-animated film, is released to stronger box office success than most of the studio's most recent output, though it is one of their biggest critical flops.
- November 6 – Evansville Tornado of November 2005: A tornado hits western Kentucky and southwestern Indiana, killing 25 with $92 million in damages.
- November 20 – The Washington Post rebukes journalist Bob Woodward over his conduct in the CIA leak probe.
- November 27 – World Wrestling Entertainment holds its Survivor Series pay-per-view event from the Joe Louis Arena in Detroit, Michigan.

=== December ===
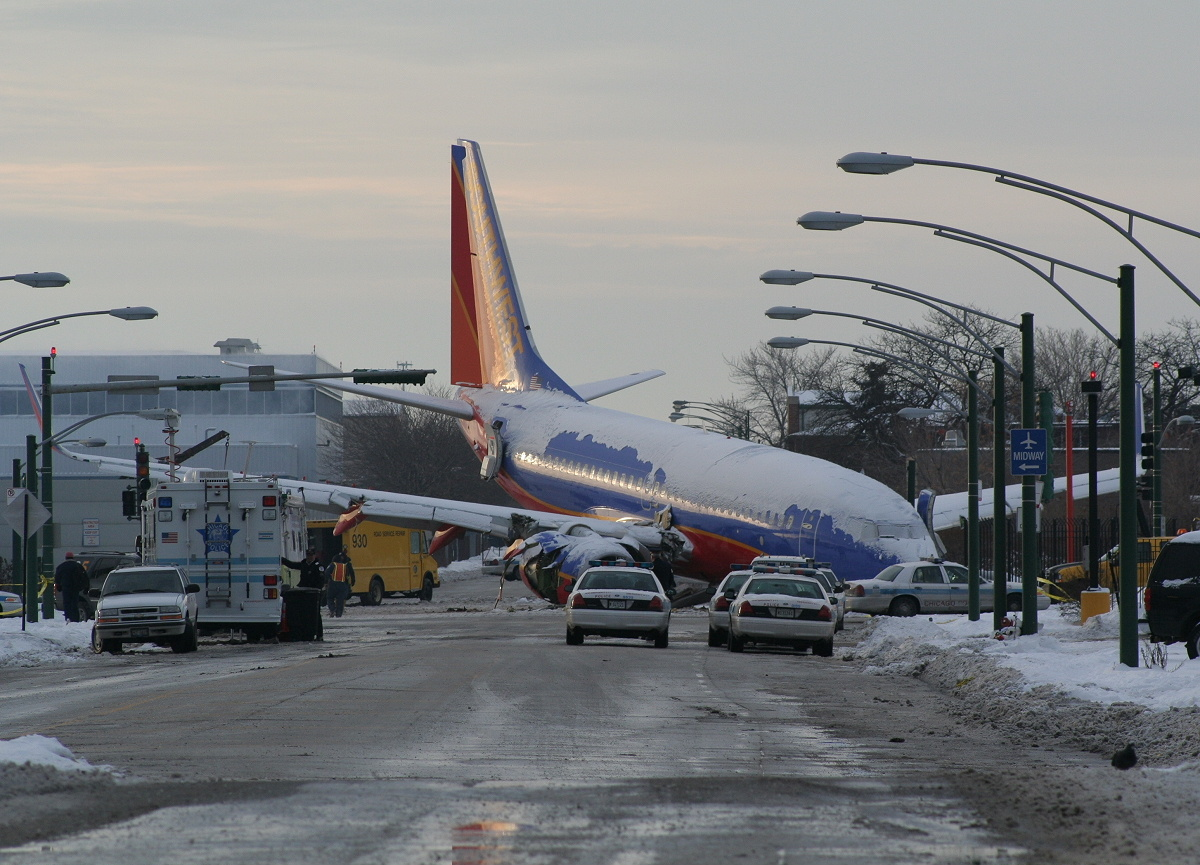
December 8: Southwest Airlines Flight 1248 overshoots the runway at Chicago Midway Airport

- December – The unemployment rate falls below 5% for the first time since August 2001; it will remain below 5% until December 2007.
- December 7 – A U.S. federal air marshal fatally shoots Rigoberto Alpizar on a jetway at Miami International Airport in Florida.
- December 8 – Southwest Airlines Flight 1248 overshoots the runway at Chicago Midway Airport, killing a 6-year-old boy and injuring 11 other people.
- December 16 – The 43rd Mersenne prime is found, 2^{30,402,457} − 1. It was discovered with the GIMPS project by Dr. Curtis Cooper and Dr. Steven Boone, professors at Central Missouri State University.
- December 18 – World Wrestling Entertainment holds its Armageddon pay-per-view event from the Dunkin' Donuts Center in Providence, Rhode Island.
- December 19 – Chalk's Ocean Airways Flight 101 crashes into the PortMiami moments after takeoff on a leg from Miami, Florida to North Bimini, The Bahamas, killing all 18 on board. The cause of the accident was revealed to be an in-flight breakup due to metal fatigue.
- December 20
  - 2005 New York City transit strike: New York City's Transport Workers Union Local 100 goes on strike for three days, shutting down all New York City Subway and Bus services.
  - Angela Johnson becomes the first woman in 50 years to be sentenced to death by the United States federal government. She is convicted of five murders in Iowa, receiving the death penalty for four of them.
- December 23 – U.S. Secretary of Defense Donald Rumsfeld announces the first in an expected series of troop drawdowns following the Iraqi elections.

=== Undated ===
- Ten years after reaching the million mark, the U.S. prison population reaches 2.5 million inmates.

=== Ongoing ===
- War in Afghanistan (2001–2021)
- Iraq War (2003–2011)

== Births ==
=== January ===
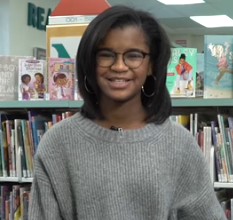
Marley Dias

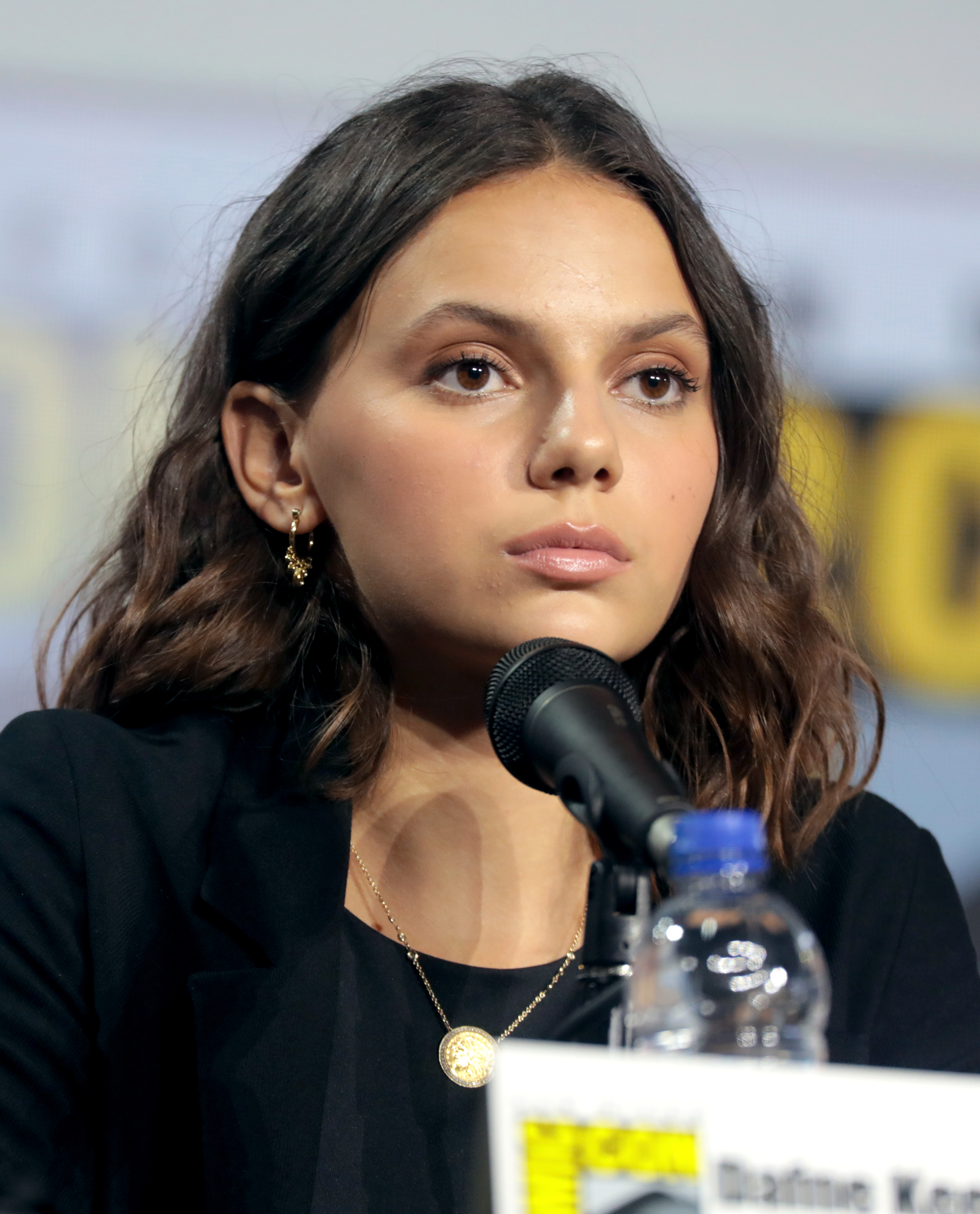
Dafne Keen

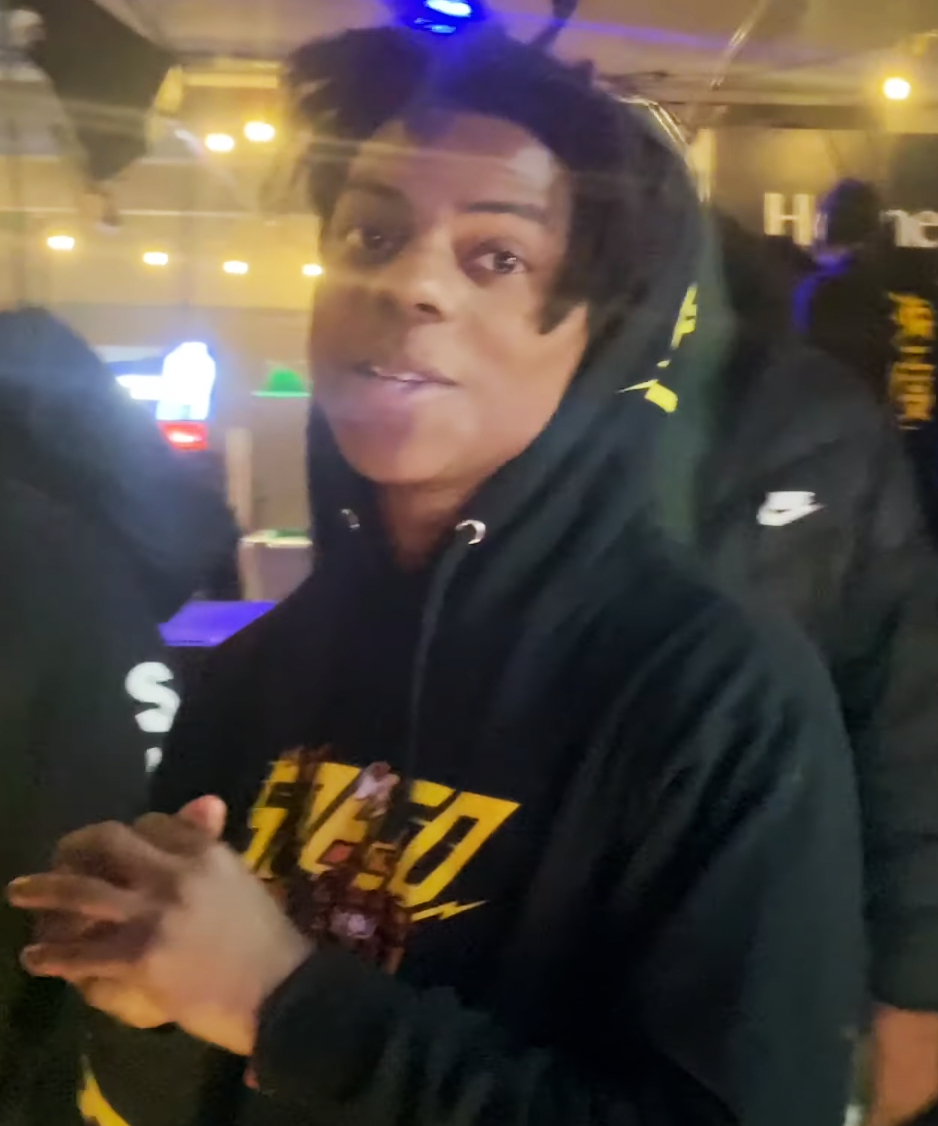
IShowSpeed

- January 3 – Marley Dias, activist
- January 4
  - Dafne Keen, actress
  - Robert Dillingham, basketball player
- January 8 – Collin Dean, actor
- January 10 – Josh Hardin, soccer player
- January 14 – Jesse Love, stock car racing driver
- January 18 – Isaie Louis, soccer player
- January 20
  - Glaive, musician
- January 21 – IShowSpeed, online streamer

=== February ===
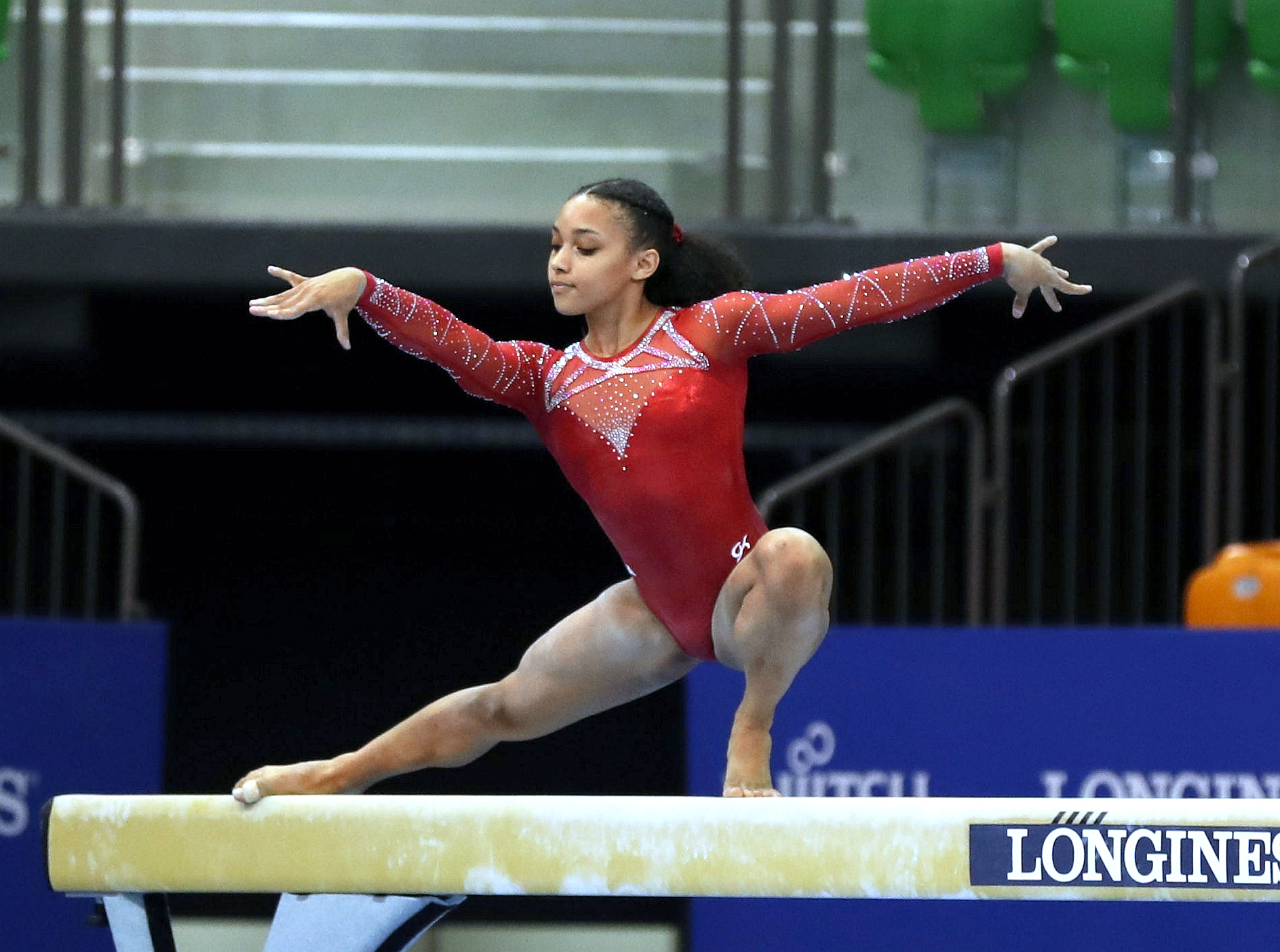
Sydney Barros

- February 1 – Konnor McClain, gymnast
- February 4 – Skye Blakely, gymnast
- February 8 – Katie Silverman, actress
- February 15 – Nicolas Bechtel, actor
- February 18 – Eden Wood, actress and reality television star
- February 20 – Gabriel Fernandez, murder victim (d. 2013)
- February 21 – Sydney Barros, gymnast
- February 23
  - Leland Honeyman, racing driver
  - Arica Himmel, actress
- February 28 – Francis Jacobs, soccer player

=== March ===
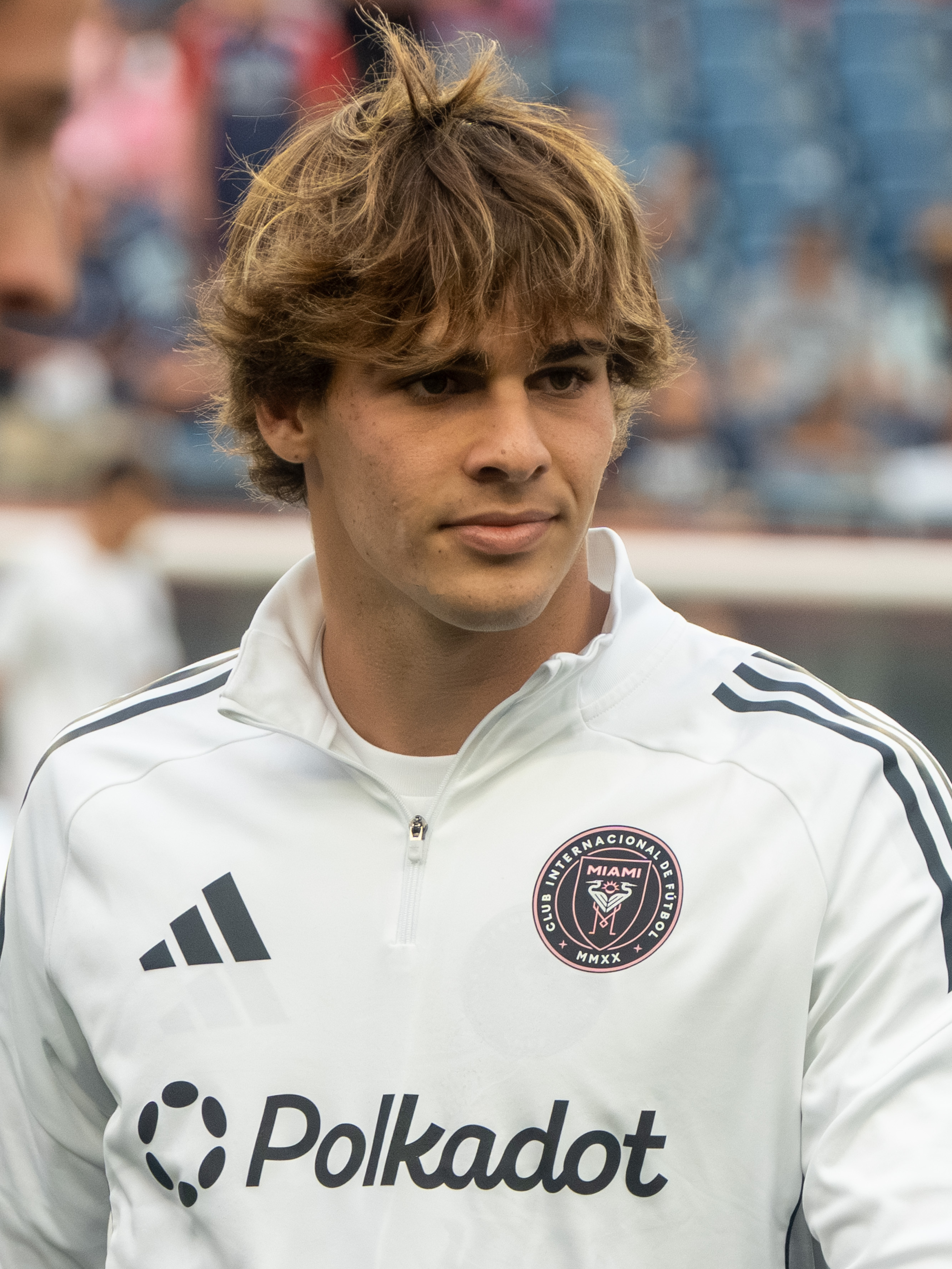
Benjamin Cremaschi

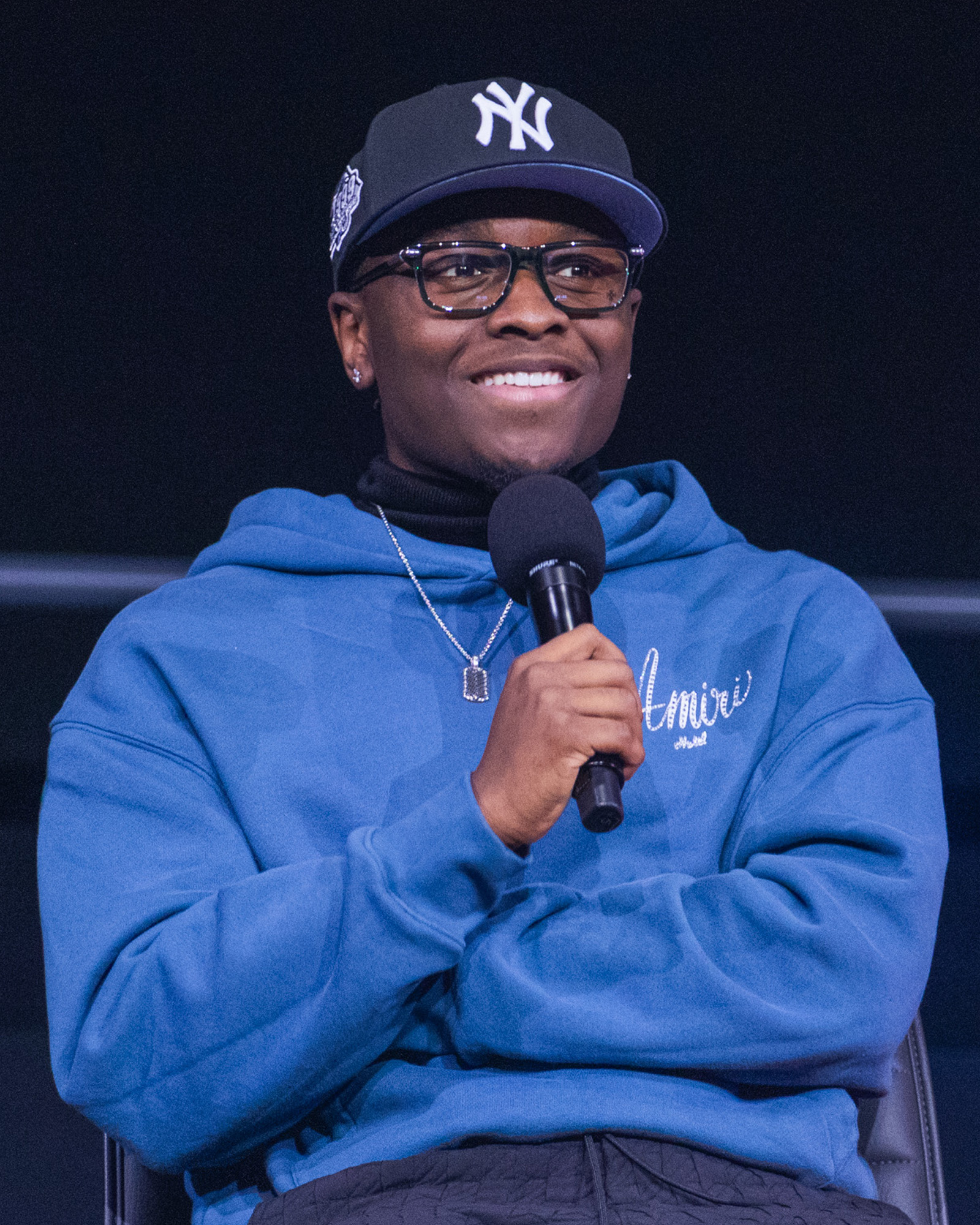
Miles Caton

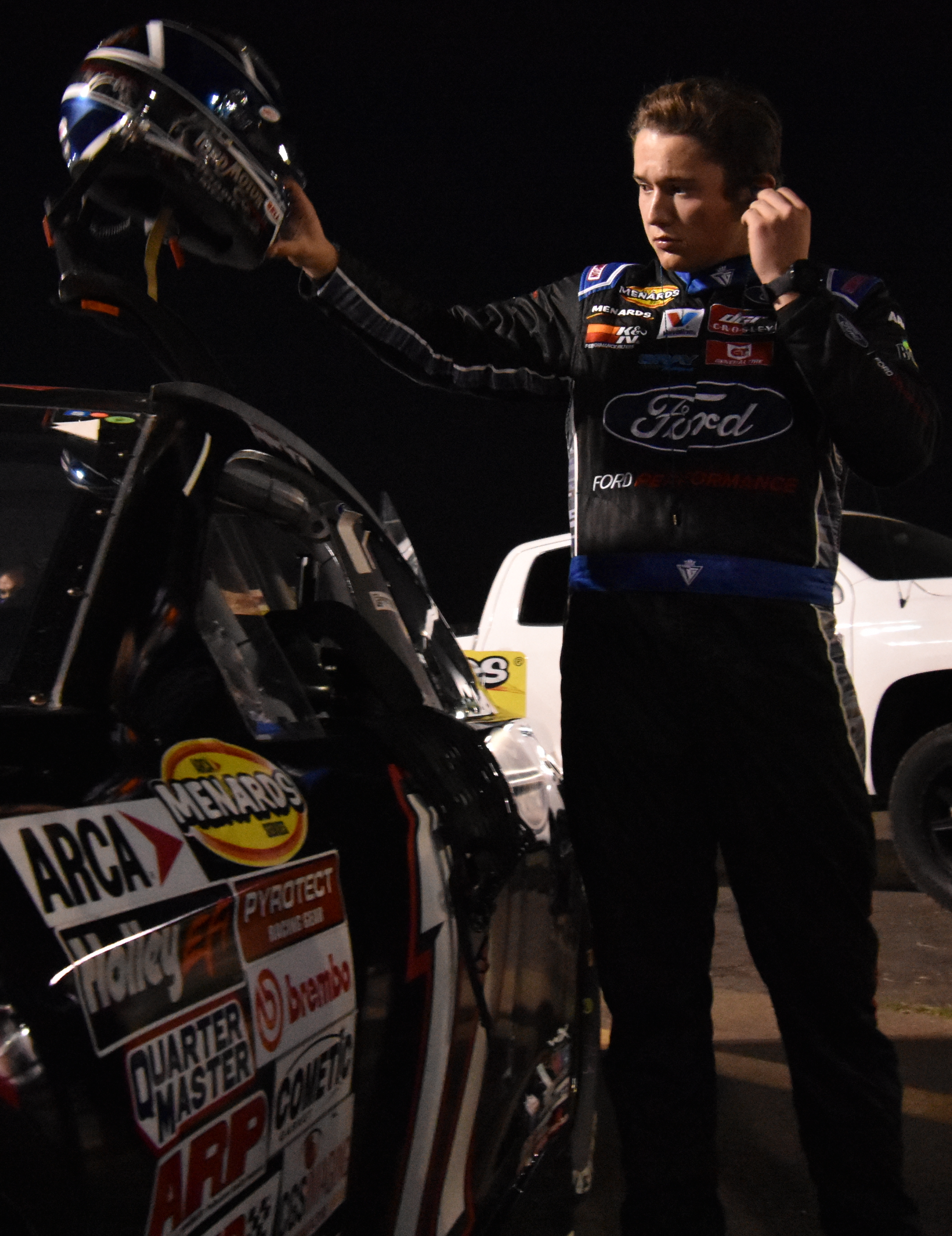
Taylor Gray

- March 1 – Felipe Valencia, soccer player
- March 2 – Benjamin Cremaschi, soccer player
- March 2 – Poe Pinson, skateboarder
- March 3 – Miles Caton, musician and actor
- March 8
  - Tate Carew, skateboarder
  - Andre Jordan Jr., American football player
- March 10 – Esmir Bajraktarevic, soccer player
- March 11 – Riley Ann Sawyers, murder victim (d. 2007)
- March 18 – Sam Williams, soccer player
- March 25 – Taylor Gray, racing driver
- March 26 – Ella Anderson, actress
- March 28 – D4vd, singer
- March 29 – Brooklyn Shuck, actress
- March 31 – Reed Baker-Whiting, soccer player

=== April ===
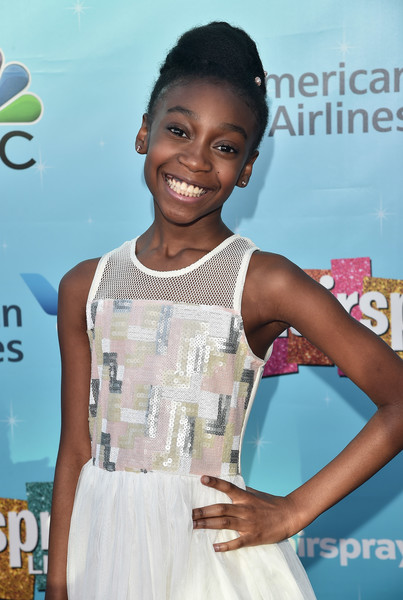
Shahadi Wright Joseph

- April 5 – Noel Buck, soccer player
- April 29
  - Gavin Beavers, soccer player
  - Shahadi Wright Joseph, actress

=== May ===
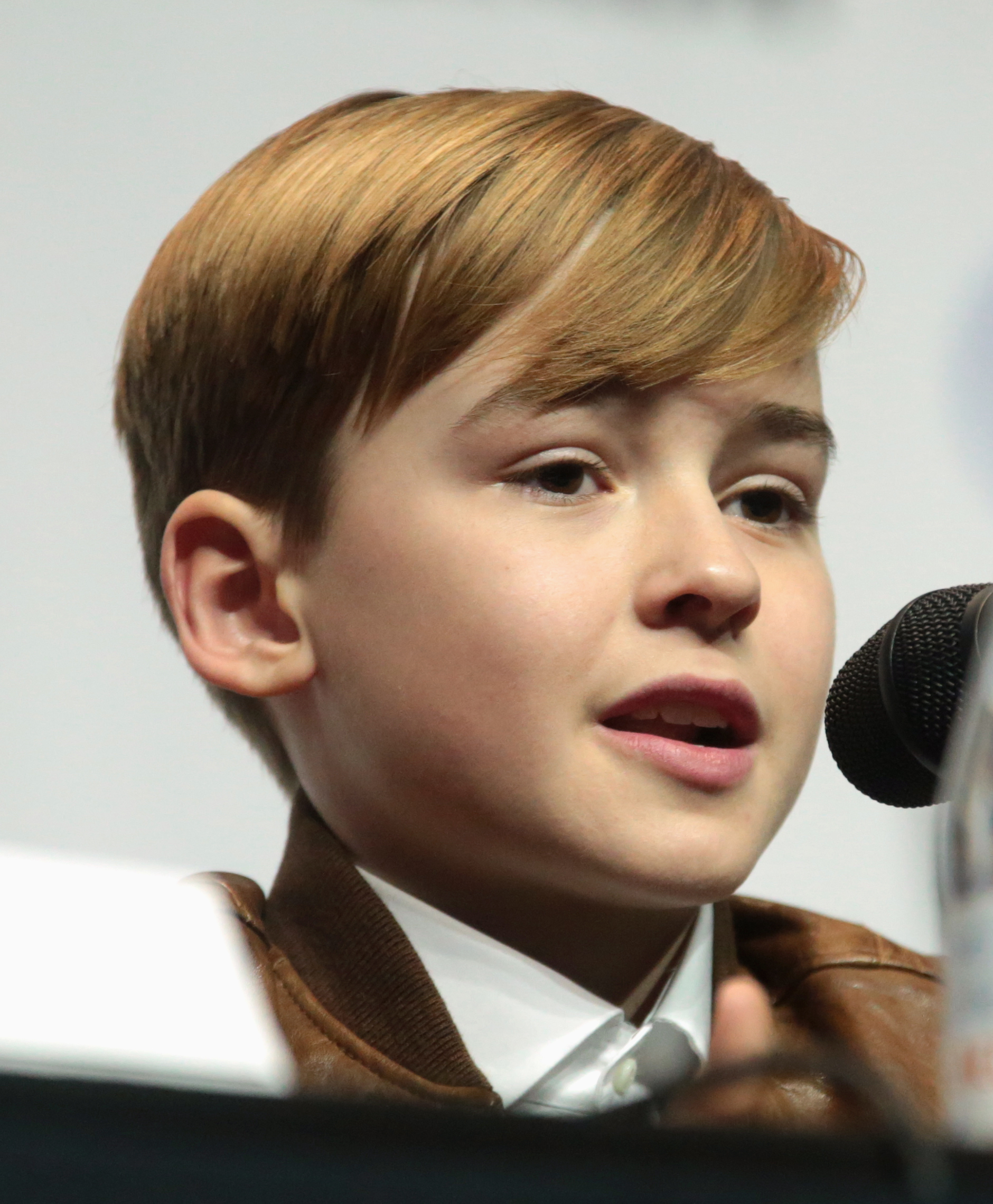
Maxwell Jenkins

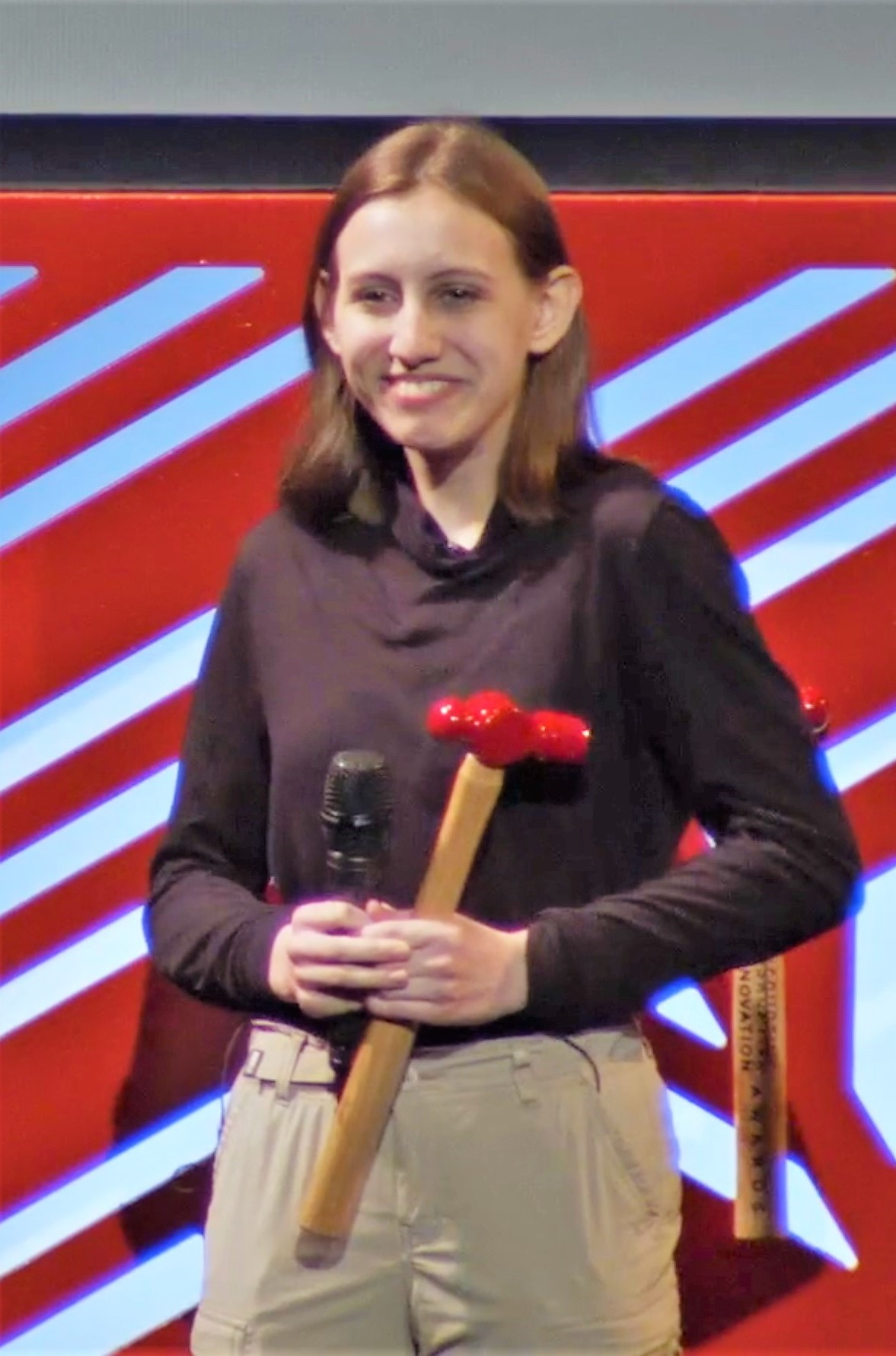
Alexandria Villaseñor

- May 2
  - Jak Crawford, racing driver
  - Gregory Diaz IV, actor
  - Joshua Wynder, soccer player
- May 3 – Maxwell Jenkins, actor
- May 4 – Dajuan Wagner Jr., basketball player
- May 5 – Emmanuel Ochoa, soccer player
- May 11
  - Ezra Frech, Paralympic athlete
  - Hunter Yeany, racing driver
- May 12 – Ava Acres, actress
- May 18 – Alexandria Villaseñor, activist
- May 20 – Ethan Kohler, soccer player
- May 25 – Bella Sims, swimmer

=== June ===
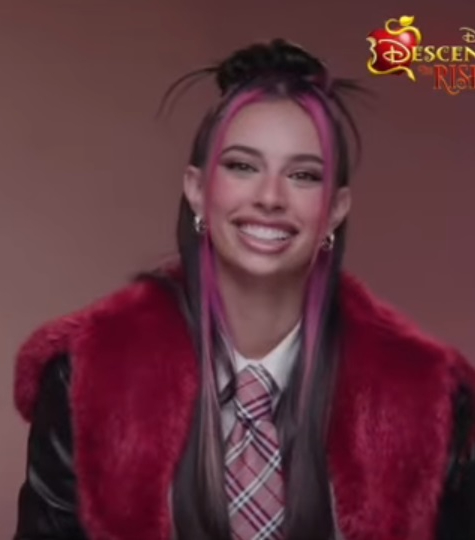
Kylie Cantrall

- June 3 – Francesca Corbett, badminton player
- June 18 – Kane Parsons, YouTuber, composer, and filmmaker
- June 25 – Kylie Cantrall, actress
- June 27 – Miles Krajewski, para-badminton player

=== July ===
- July 7 – Jesse Ray Sheps, actor
- July 9 – Serge Ngoma, soccer player
- July 12 – Issac Ryan Brown, actor
- July 20 – Alison Fernandez, actress
- July 25 – Pierce Gagnon, actor

=== August ===
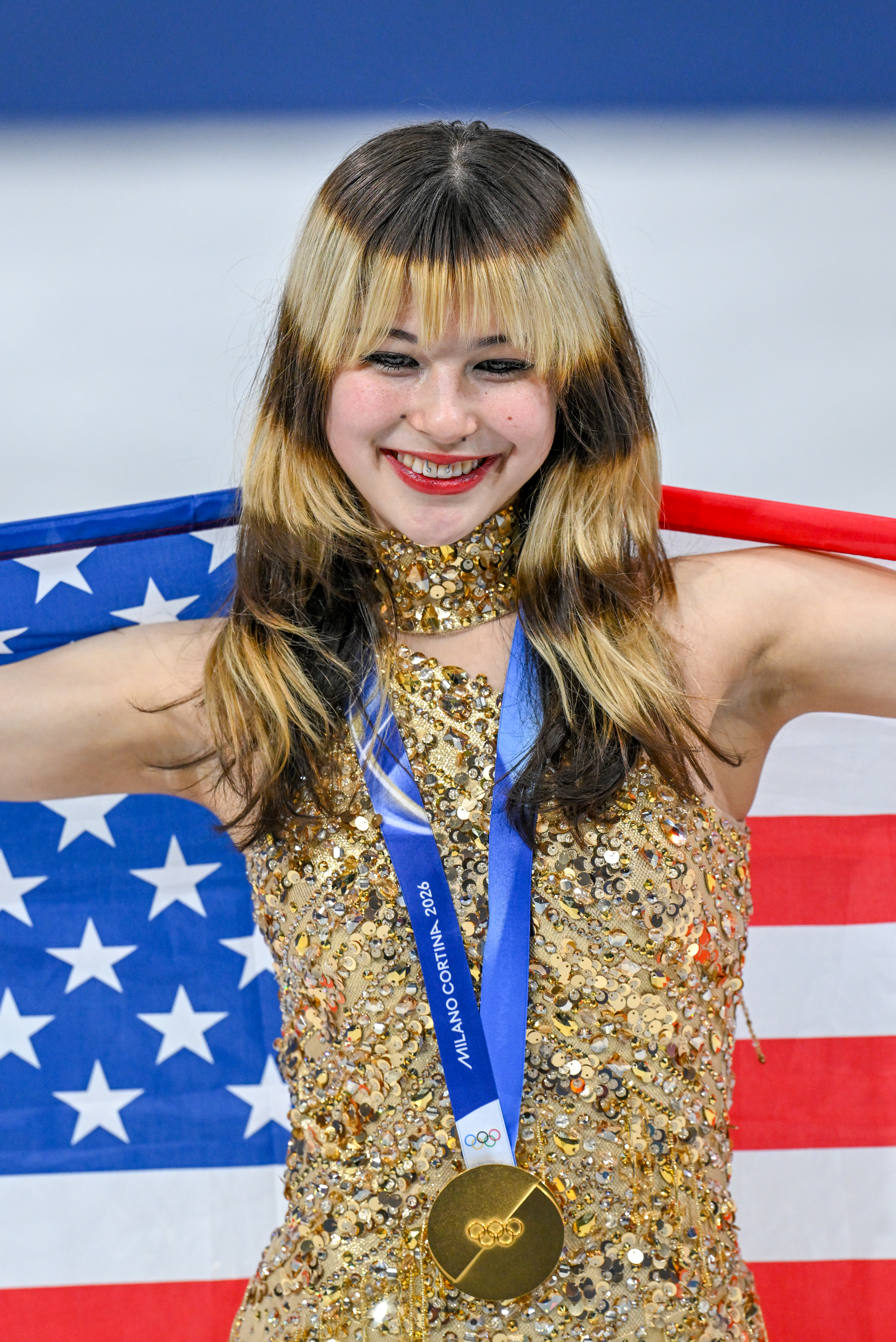
Alysa Liu

- August 5 – Obed Vargas, soccer player
- August 8 – Alysa Liu, figure skater
- August 9 – Caylee Anthony, murder victim (d. 2008)
- August 10 – Sunny Suljic, actor

=== September ===
- September 17 – Olivia Moultrie, soccer player
- September 26 – Jack Hoffman, notable brain cancer patient (d. 2025)
- September 29 – Gabrielle Gutierrez, actress

=== October ===
- October 1 – Rosalie Chiang, actress
- October 7 – Lulu Wilson, actress
- October 15 – Jarin Stevenson, South Korean professional basketball player
- October 16 – Ruby Rose Turner, actress
- October 25 – Luke Vickery, Indonesian soccer player

=== November ===
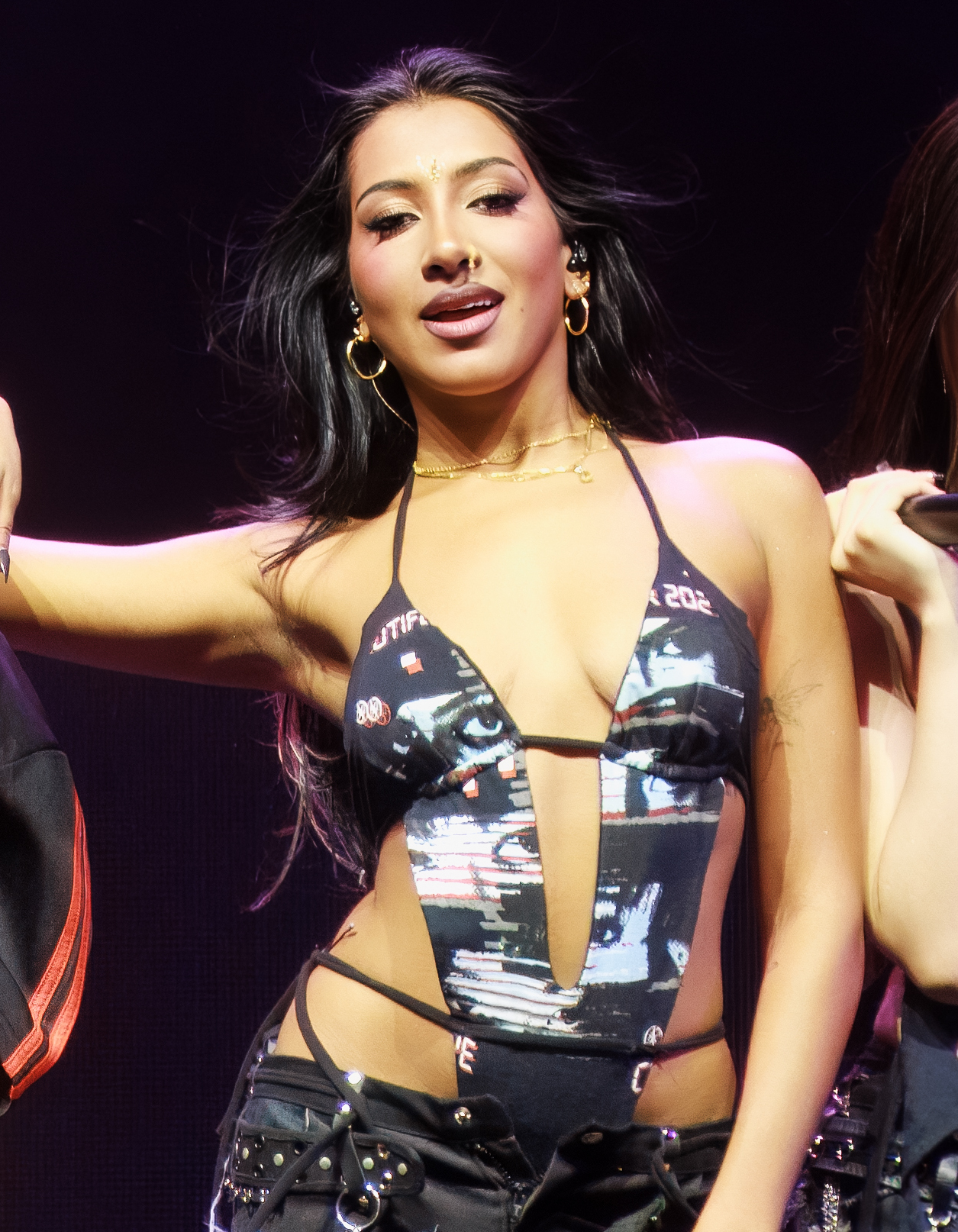
Lara Raj

- November 3 – Lara Raj, singer and dancer
- November 9 – Diego Rosales, soccer player
- November 19 – Gitanjali Rao, scientist
- November 20 – Curtis Ofori, soccer player

=== December ===
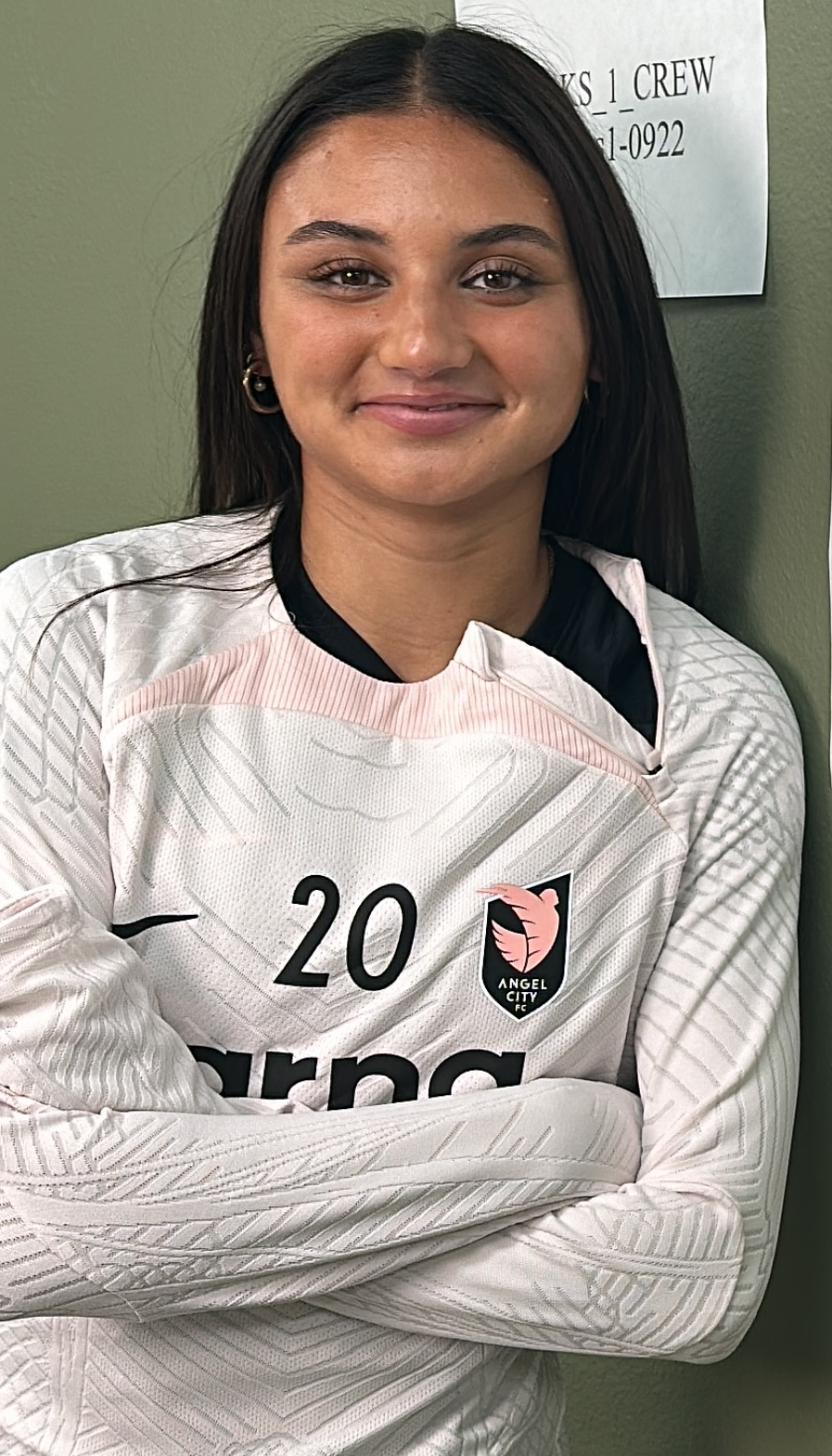
Gisele Thompson

- December 2 – Gisele Thompson, soccer player
- December 10 – Kyliegh Curran, actress
- December 14 – Mia Sinclair Jenness, actress
- December 17 – Clavicular, online streamer

=== Unknown ===
- Connor Michalek, WWE fan who died of cancer (d. 2014)

== Deaths ==
=== January ===
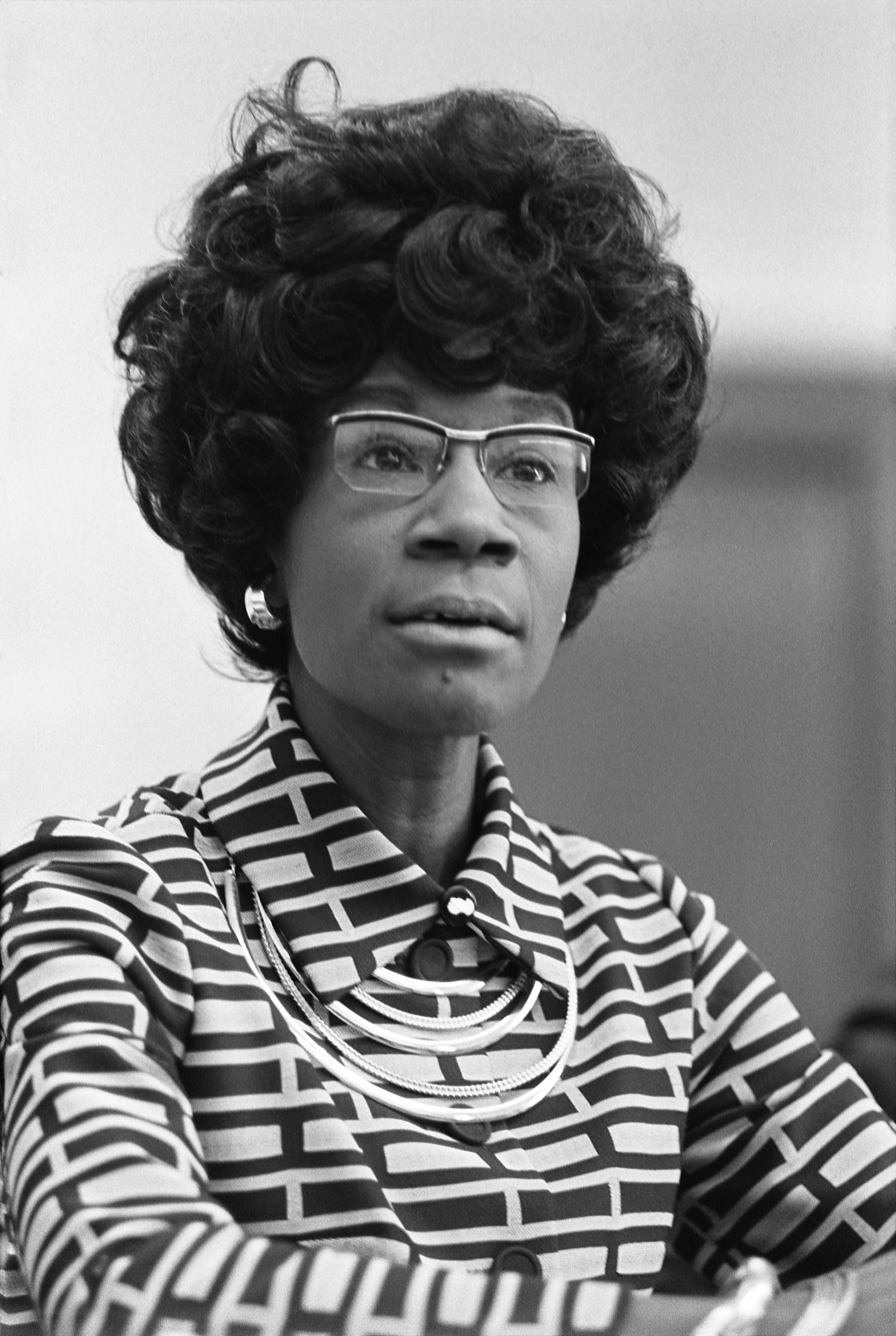
Shirley Chisholm

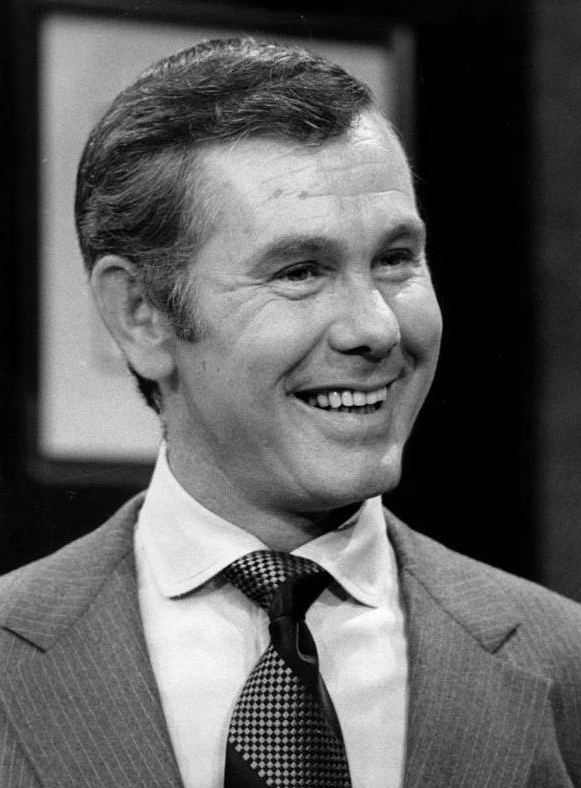
Johnny Carson

- January 1
  - Shirley Chisholm, American politician, educator and author (b. 1924)
  - Eugene J. Martin, American artist (b. 1938)
  - Bob Matsui, Japanese-American politician (b. 1941)
- January 2
  - Arnold Denker, American chess player (b. 1914)
  - Maclyn McCarty, American geneticist (b. 1911)
- January 3 – Will Eisner, American cartoonist, writer and entrepreneur (b. 1917)
- January 4
  - Guy Davenport, American writer, artist and scholar (b. 1927)
  - Robert Heilbroner, writer (b. 1919)
  - Alton Tobey, artist (b. 1914)
- January 7 – Rosemary Kennedy, socialite (b. 1918)
- January 10 – James Forman, civil rights activist (b. 1928)
- January 11 – Spencer Dryden, rock drummer (b. 1938)
- January 15 – Ruth Warrick, singer, actress and political activist (b. 1916)
- January 17 – Virginia Mayo, actress (b. 1920)
- January 19 – Lamont Bentley, actor and rapper (b. 1973)
- January 20 – Roland Frye, theologian and critic (b. 1921)
- January 21 – Adrianne Leigh Reynolds, murder victim (b. 1988)
- January 22 – Rose Mary Woods, secretary to Richard Nixon (b. 1917)
- January 23 – Johnny Carson, television host and comedian (b. 1925)
- January 25 – Philip Johnson, architect (b. 1906)
- January 28 – Lucien Carr, key member of the original New York City circle of the Beat Generation in the 1940s (b. 1925)
- January 29
  - Bill Shadel, radio and television anchor (b. 1908)
  - Joan Tompkins, actress (b. 1915)

=== February ===
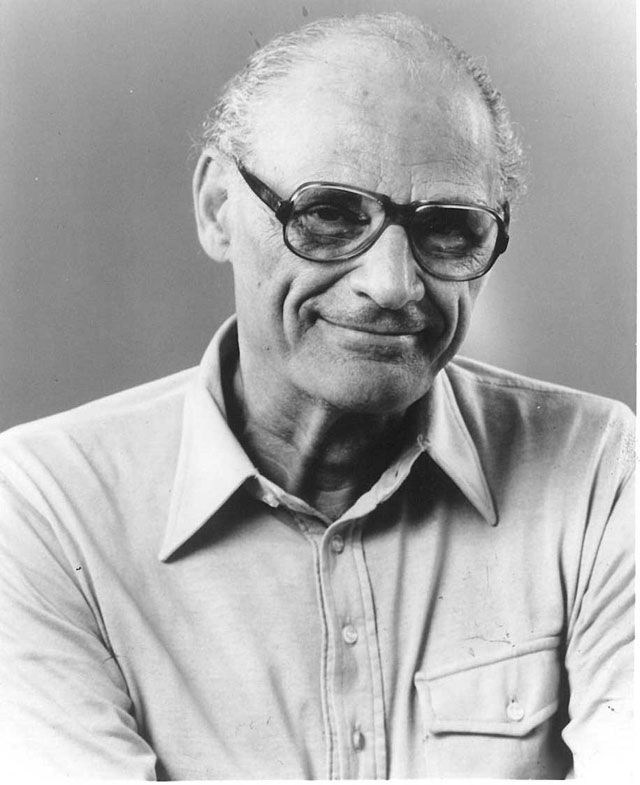
Arthur Miller

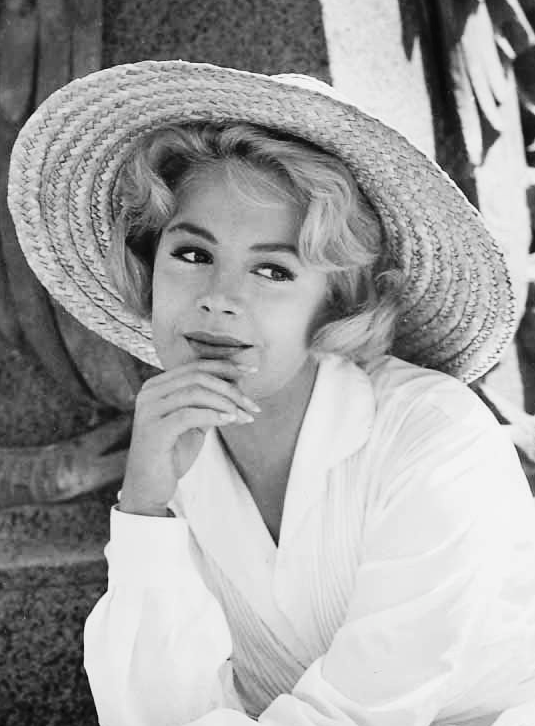
Sandra Dee

- February 1 – John Vernon, Canadian actor (b. 1932)
- February 3 – Ernst Mayr, German-American evolutionary biologist (b. 1904)
- February 4 – Ossie Davis, American actor, director, poet, playwright, author and activist (b. 1917)
- February 5 – Bob Brannum, American basketball player (b. 1925)
- February 6
  - Elbert N. Carvel, politician (b. 1910)
  - Merle Kilgore, singer and songwriter (b. 1934)
- February 8
  - Mike Bishop, American basketball player (b. 1958)
  - George Herman, American journalist (b. 1920)
  - Keith Knudsen, drummer (b. 1948)
  - Jimmy Smith, jazz musician (b. 1925)
- February 10 – Arthur Miller, playwright and husband of Marilyn Monroe (b. 1915)
- February 11 – Jack L. Chalker, American author and writer (b. 1944)
- February 12
  - Brian Kelly, American actor (b. 1931)
  - Sammi Smith, American country music singer-songwriter (b. 1943)
- February 13 – Nelson Briles, American baseball player (b. 1943)
- February 14 – Dick Weber, American boxer (b. 1929)
- February 14 – F. M. Busby, American author (b. 1921)
- February 15 – Samuel T. Francis, American Radical right columnist and writer. (b. 1947)
- February 17 – Dan O'Herlihy, Irish actor (b. 1919)
- February 20
  - Sandra Dee, actress (b. 1944)
  - John Raitt, actor and singer (b. 1917)
  - Hunter S. Thompson, journalist (b. 1937)
- February 24
  - Sumner Gerard, politician and diplomat (b. 1916)
  - Hugh Nibley, scholar and prominent member of the Church of Jesus Christ Latter-day Saints (b. 1910)
- February 25 – Ben Bowen, child cancer patient (b. 2002)
- February 26 – Jef Raskin, computer scientist (b. 1943)

=== March ===
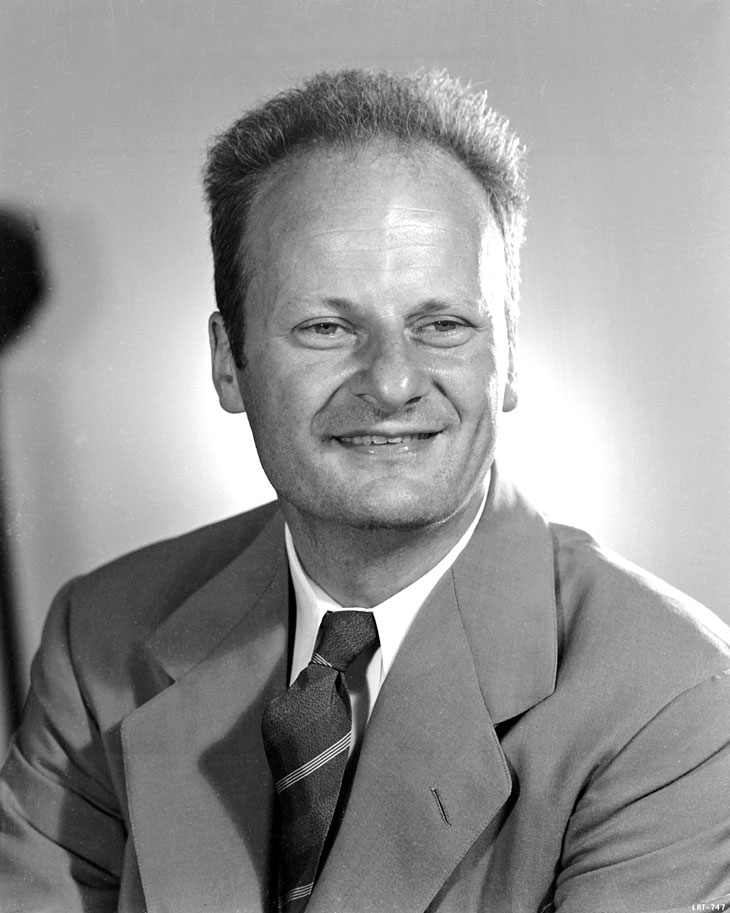
Hans Bethe

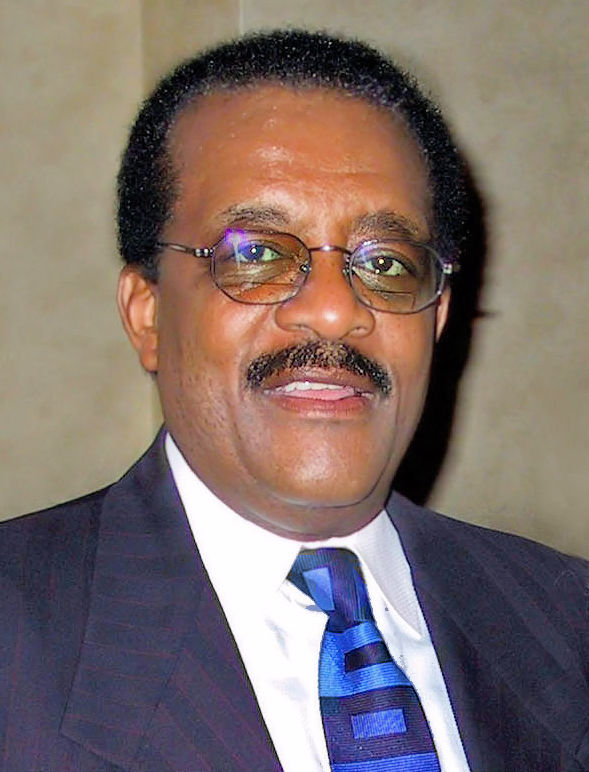
Johnnie Cochran

- March 6
  - Hans Bethe, German-born physicist, Nobel Prize laureate (b. 1906)
  - Teresa Wright, actress (b. 1918)
- March 9 – Chris LeDoux, rodeo performer and singer (b. 1949)
- March 13 – Lyn Collins, R&B singer (b. 1948)
- March 15 – Don Durant, actor and singer (b. 1932)
- March 17
  - George F. Kennan, diplomat and political advisor (b. 1904)
  - Andre Norton, writer (b. 1912)
- March 19 – John DeLorean, car maker (b. 1925)
- March 21
  - Barney Martin, actor (b. 1923)
  - Bobby Short, pianist and singer (b. 1924)
  - Jeff Weise, American teenage mass murderer and spree killer (b. 1988)
- March 29
  - Howell Heflin, politician and U.S. senator (b. 1921)
  - Johnnie Cochran, American lawyer (b. 1937)
  - Mitch Hedberg, American stand-up comedian (b. 1968)
- March 30
  - Robert Creeley, American poet (b. 1926)
  - Mitch Hedberg, American comedian (b. 1968)
  - Fred Korematsu, Japanese-American civil rights activist (b. 1919)
- March 31
  - Frank Perdue, businessman (b. 1920)
  - Terri Schiavo, right-to-die cause célèbre (b. 1963)

=== April ===
- April 1 – Jack Keller, songwriter and producer (b. 1936)
- April 5
  - Saul Bellow, writer (b. 1915)
  - Debralee Scott, actress (b. 1953)
- April 6 – Anthony F. DePalma, orthopedic surgeon and professor (b. 1904)
- April 14 – Saunders Mac Lane, American mathematician (b. 1909)
- April 16 – Marla Ruzicka, activist, founder of Campaign for Innocent Victims in Conflict (b. 1976)
- April 19 – Ruth Hussey, actress (b. 1911)
- April 22 – Philip Morrison, physicist (b. 1915)
- April 26
  - Mason Adams, actor (b. 1919)
  - Hasil Adkins, singer-songwriter (b. 1937)
- April 28 – Chris Candido, professional wrestler (b. 1972)

=== May ===
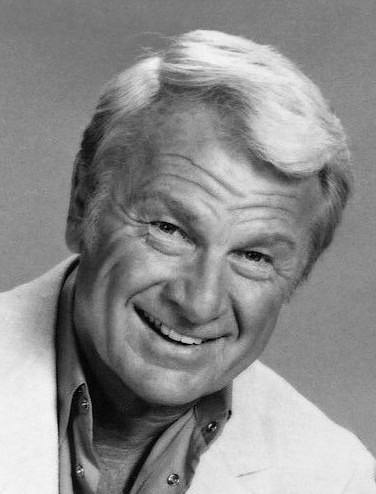
Eddie Albert

- May 5 – Elisabeth Fraser, actress (b. 1920)
- May 7 – Peter Wallace Rodino, politician (b. 1909)
- May 8 – Lloyd Cutler, attorney and presidential advisor (b. 1917)
- May 13 – George Dantzig, mathematician (b. 1914)
- May 14 – Jimmy Martin, musician (b. 1927)
- May 16 – Eliza Jane Scovill, AIDS victim (b. 2001)
- May 17 – Frank Gorshin, American actor, impressionist and comedian (b. 1933)
- May 20
  - J. D. Cannon, actor (b. 1922)
  - Joseph Levis, Olympic fencer (b. 1905)
- May 21 – Howard Morris, actor (b. 1919)
- May 22 – Thurl Ravenscroft, voice actor (b. 1914)
- May 26 – Eddie Albert, actor (b. 1906)

=== June ===
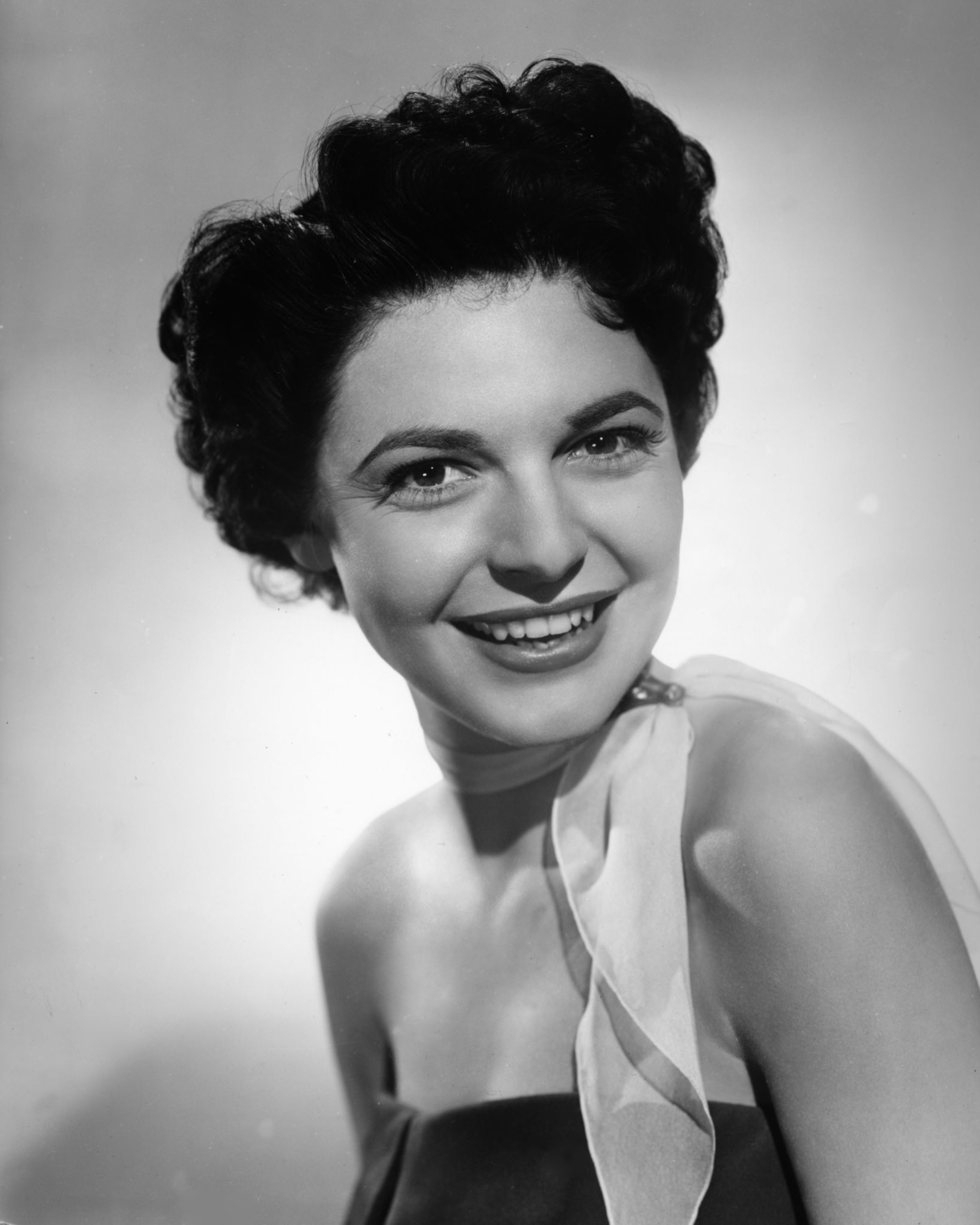
Anne Bancroft

- June 1 – George Mikan, basketball player (b. 1924)
- June 4 –
  - Marian Gleason, politician (b. 1916)
  - Ronald F. Marryott, admiral (b. 1934)
- June 6
  - Maurice Rabb Jr., ophthalmologist (b. 1932)
  - Dana Elcar, actor (b. 1927)
  - Anne Bancroft, actress and wife of Mel Brooks (b. 1931)
- June 7 - Terry Long, American football player (b. 1959)
- June 8 – Ed Bishop, actor (b. 1932)
- June 13 – Lane Smith, American actor (b. 1936)
- June 20
  - Charles David Keeling, climate scientist (b. 1928)
  - Jack Kilby, electronics engineer, Nobel Prize laureate (b. 1923)
- June 24 – Paul Winchell, ventriloquist, comedian, actor, voice artist, humanitarian and inventor (b. 1922)
- June 25
  - Domino Harvey, British-American bounty hunter (b. 1969)
  - John Fiedler, actor (b. 1925)
- June 27
  - Shelby Foote, American historian and novelist (b. 1916)
  - John T. Walton, veteran and son of Walmart founder Sam Walton (b. 1946)
- June 28
  - Danny Dietz, American naval officer (b. 1980)
  - Erik S. Kristensen, American naval officer (b. 1972)
  - Michael P. Murphy, American naval officer (b. 1976)
  - Stephen C. Reich, American 160th SOAR officer (b. 1971)

=== July ===
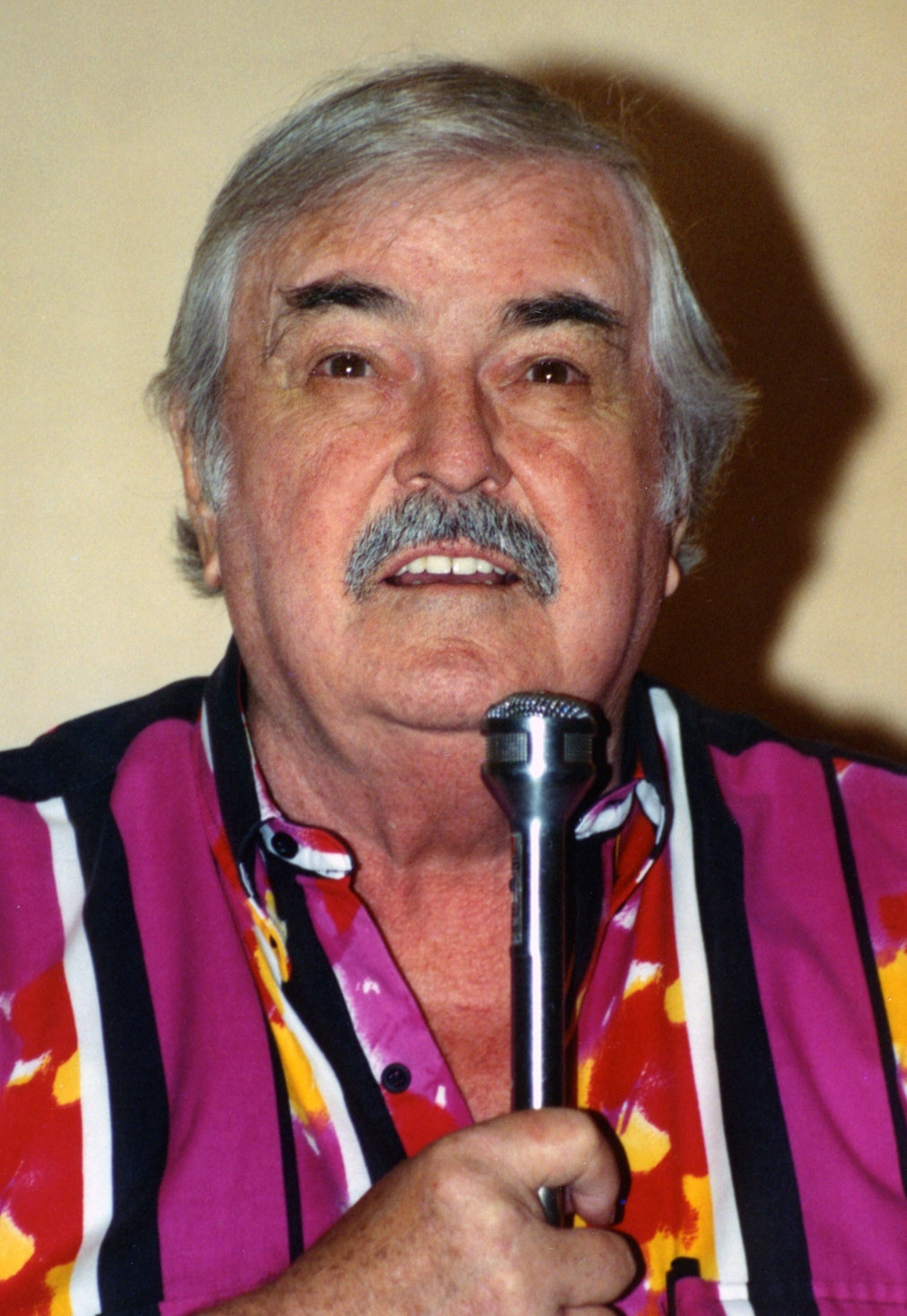
James Doohan

- July 1
  - Renaldo Benson, soul and R&B singer and songwriter (b. 1936)
  - Luther Vandross, singer, songwriter and record producer (b. 1951)
- July 4
  - June Haver, actress and singer (b. 1926)
  - Hank Stram, football coach (b. 1923)
- July 5 – James Stockdale, admiral and vice presidential candidate (b. 1923)
- July 6
  - Bruno Augenstein, German-born American mathematician and physicist (b. 1923)
  - L. Patrick Gray, FBI director (b. 1916)
  - Ed McBain, screenwriter and crime fiction writer (b. 1926)
- July 9 – Kevin Hagen, television actor (b. 1928)
- July 10 – Richard Eastham, actor (b. 1916)
- July 11 – Frances Langford, radio and film actress and singer (b. 1913)
- July 14 – Joe Harnell, pianist and composer (b. 1924)
- July 16 – John Ostrom, paleontologist (b. 1928)
- July 17 – Geraldine Fitzgerald, Irish actress (b. 1913)
- July 18 – William Westmoreland, general (b. 1914)
- July 19 – Ed Cifers, American football player (b. 1916)
- July 20 – James Doohan, Canadian actor (b. 1920)
- July 22 – Eugene Record, singer-songwriter (b. 1940)
- July 21 – Lord Alfred Hayes, English wrestler, manager, and commentator (b. 1928)
- July 23 – Myron Floren, accordionist (b. 1919)
- July 25 – Ford Rainey, actor (b. 1908)
- July 26 – Jack Hirshleifer, economist (b. 1925)
- July 29 – Pat McCormick, actor and comedy writer (b. 1927)

=== August ===
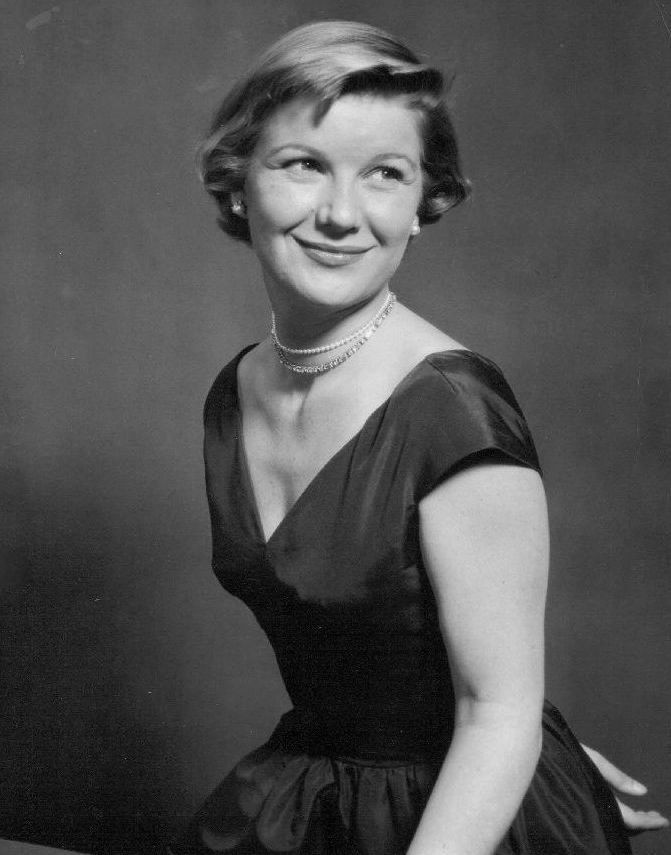
Barbara Bel Geddes

- August 1 – John Alevizos, businessman (b. 1919)
- August 2 – Jay Hammond, politician (b. 1922)
- August 4 — Ilen Getz, actress (b. 1961)
- August 5 — Jim O'Hora, college football coach (b. 1915)
- August 7 – Peter Jennings, journalist (b. 1938)
- August 8
  - Barbara Bel Geddes, actress (b. 1922)
  - John H. Johnson, businessman and publisher. (b. 1918)
- August 9 – Matthew McGrory, screen actor noted for his height (b. 1973)
- August 11 – Ted Radcliffe, baseball player (b. 1902)
- August 16 – Joe Ranft, screenwriter, animator, storyboard artist and voice actor (b. 1960)
- August 17 – John Norris Bahcall, astrophysicist (b. 1934)
- August 21 – Robert Moog, pioneer of electronic music (b. 1934)
- August 23 – Brock Peters, actor (b. 1927)

=== September ===
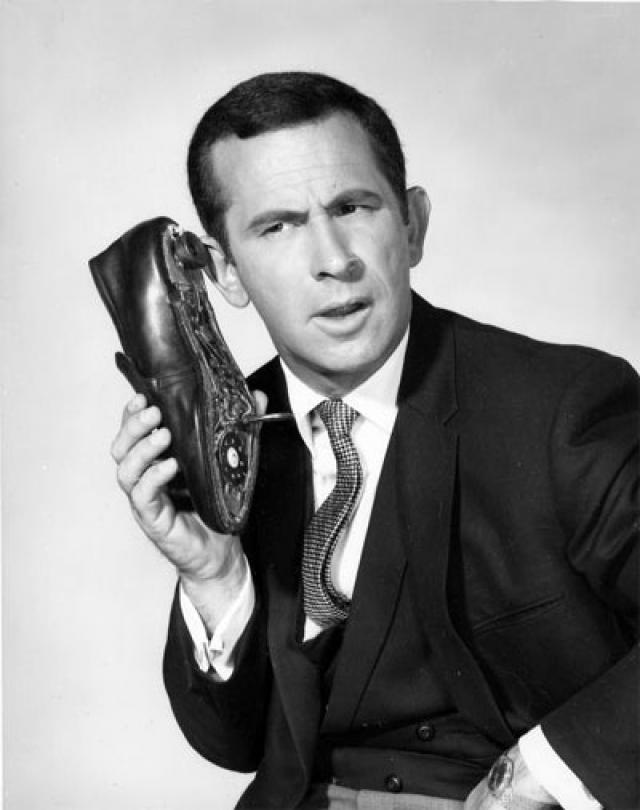
Don Adams

- September 1 – R.L. Burnside, American blues singer (b. 1926)
- September 2 – Bob Denver, American actor (b. 1935)
- September 3
  - William Rehnquist, Chief Justice of the United States. (b. 1924)
  - James Rossi, Olympic cyclist. (b. 1936)
- September 11 – Chris Schenkel, sportscaster (b. 1923)
- September 14
- ( William Berenberg, physician (b. 1915)
  - Robert Wise, American film director (b. 1914)
- September 16 – Constance Moore, American singer and actress (b. 1920)
- September 21 – Molly Yard, American feminist (b. 1912)
- September 24 – Tommy Bond, actor, director, producer, and writer (b. 1926)
- September 25
  - Don Adams, American actor (b. 1923)
  - Urie Bronfenbrenner, Russian-born American professor of psychology (b. 1917)

=== October ===
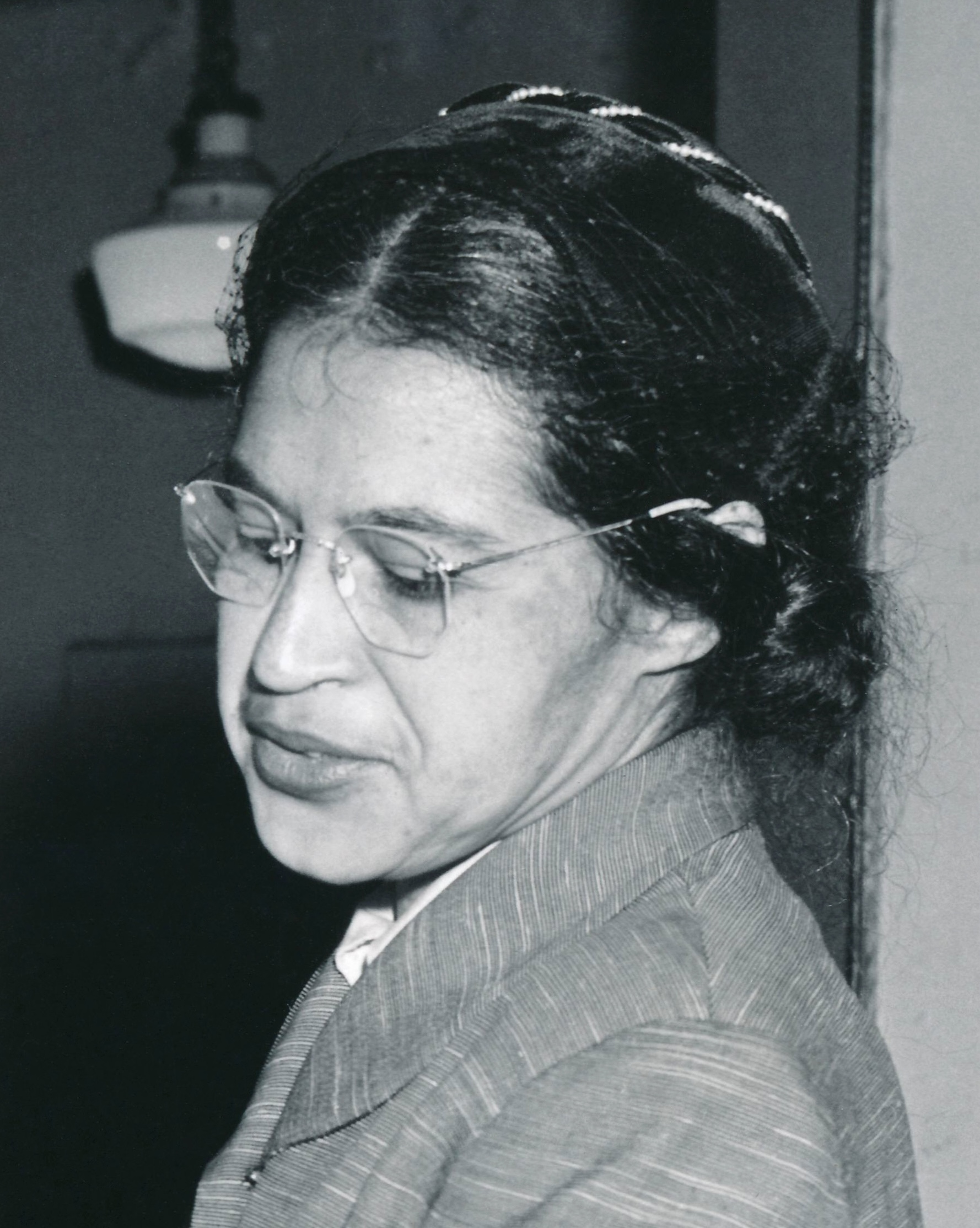
Rosa Parks

- October 2 – Nipsey Russell, actor and comedian (b. 1918)
- October 3 – Henry Howard Sr., politician (b. 1930)
- October 7 – Charles Rocket, actor, comedian, musician, and reporter (b. 1949)
- October 9 – Louis Nye, actor (b. 1913)
- October 12 – Jack White, journalist and reporter (b. 1942)
- October 13 – Vivian Malone Jones, one of the first two black students at the University of Alabama (b. 1942)
- October 16 – Eugene "Porky" Lee, child actor (b. 1933)
- October 18 – Bill King, sports broadcaster (b. 1927)
- October 20
  - Shirley Horn, jazz singer and pianist (b. 1934)
  - Otto Luedeke, Olympic cyclist (b. 1916)
- October 21
  - Tara Correa-McMullen, actress (b. 1989)
  - Alvin Neelley, murderer (b. 1953)
- October 22 – Arman, French-born American artist (b. 1928)
- October 24 – Rosa Parks, civil rights activist (b. 1913)
- October 28 – Richard Smalley, chemist and physicist, Nobel Prize laureate (b. 1943)
- October 29 – Lloyd Bochner, Canadian actor (b. 1924)
- October 31 – William O. Baker, scientist and businessman, president of Bell Labs (b. 1915)

=== November ===
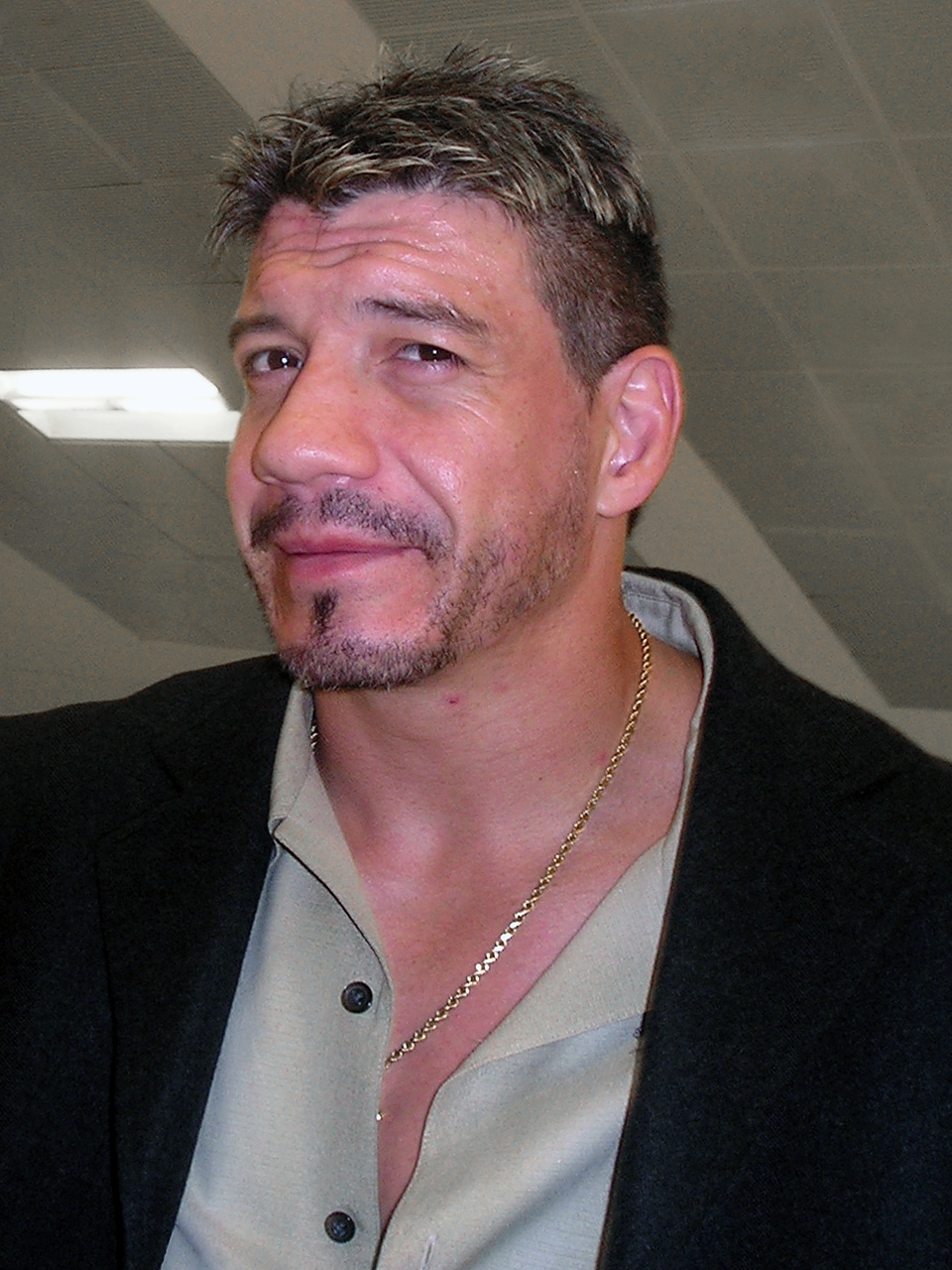
Eddie Guerrero

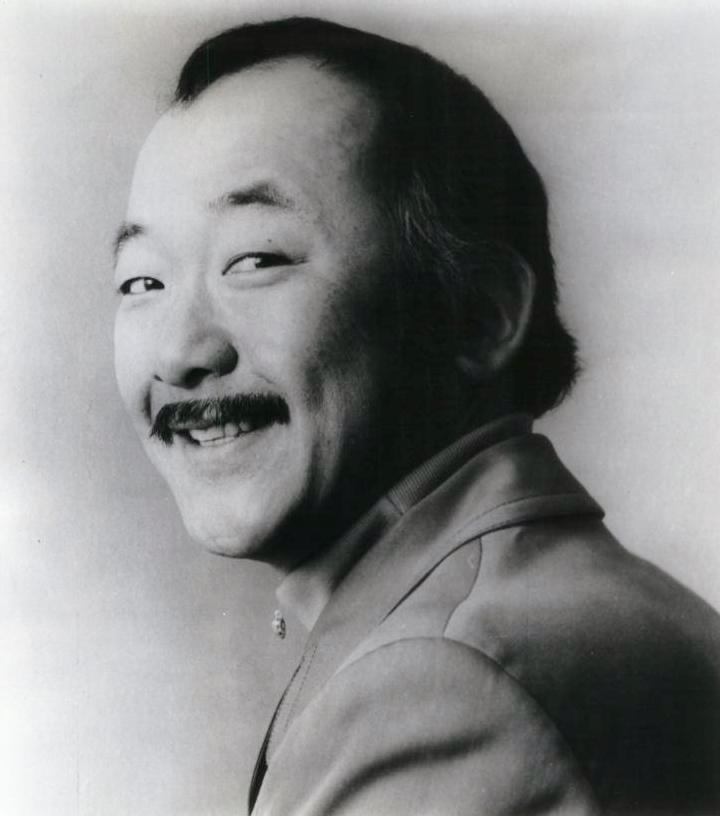
Pat Morita

- November 1
  - Skitch Henderson, pianist, conductor, and composer (b. 1918)
  - Michael Piller, American screenwriter and producer (b. 1948)
- November 4 – Sheree North, American actress, dancer and singer (b. 1932)
- November 12 – James Fyfe, criminologist and instructor (b. 1942)
- November 13
  - Eddie Guerrero, Mexican-American professional wrestler (b. 1967)
  - Ruth Siems, American home economist (b. 1931)
- November 15 – Adrian Rogers, religious leader (b. 1931)
- November 16
  - Ralph Edwards, host and producer (b. 1913)
  - Henry Taube, Canadian-American chemist and academic, Nobel Prize laureate (b. 1915)
- November 18
  - Harold J. Stone, American actor (b. 1913)
  - Elias Syriani, Jordanian-born American convicted murderer (b. 1938)
- November 23 – Constance Cummings, American-British actress (b. 1910)
- November 24 – Pat Morita, American actor (b. 1932)
- November 26 – Stan Berenstain, writer and illustrator (b. 1923)
- November 29 – Wendie Jo Sperber, actress (b. 1958)

=== December ===
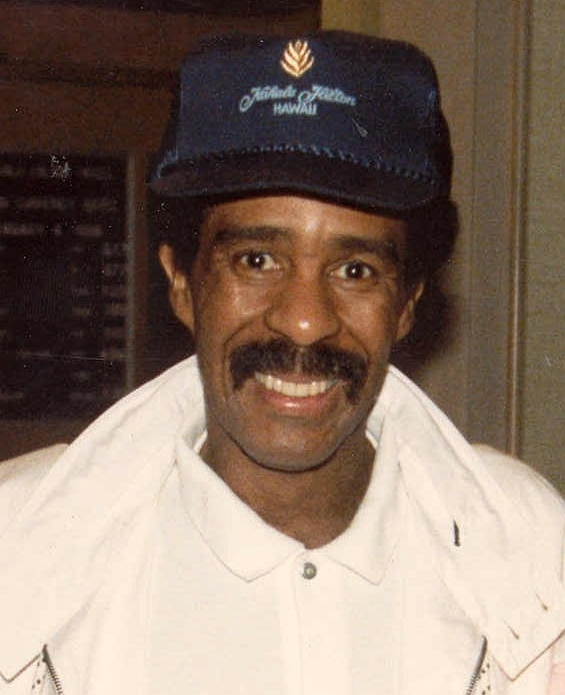
Richard Pryor

- December 2
  - William P. Lawrence, admiral and pilot (b. 1930)
  - Nat Mayer Shapiro, painter (b. 1919)
- December 10
  - Eugene McCarthy, politician and writer (b. 1916)
  - Mary Jackson, actress (b. 1910)
  - Richard Pryor, actor and comedian (b. 1940)
- December 14 – Stew Bowers baseball player (b. 1915)
- December 16 – John Spencer, actor (b. 1946)
- December 17 – Jack Anderson, newspaper columnist (b. 1922)
- December 20 – Bradford Cannon, Boston plastic surgeon (b. 1907)
- December 21 – Elrod Hendricks, baseball player and coach (b. 1940)
- December 24 – Michael Vale, actor (b. 1922)
- December 26 – Vincent Schiavelli, actor (b. 1948)
- December 31
  - Sanora Babb, writer (b. 1907)
  - Enrico Di Giuseppe, operatic tenor (b. 1932)

== See also ==
- 2005 in American soccer
- 2005 in American television
- List of American films of 2005
- Timeline of United States history (1990–2009)
