= Monsters of Rock (band) =

American heavy metal tribute band

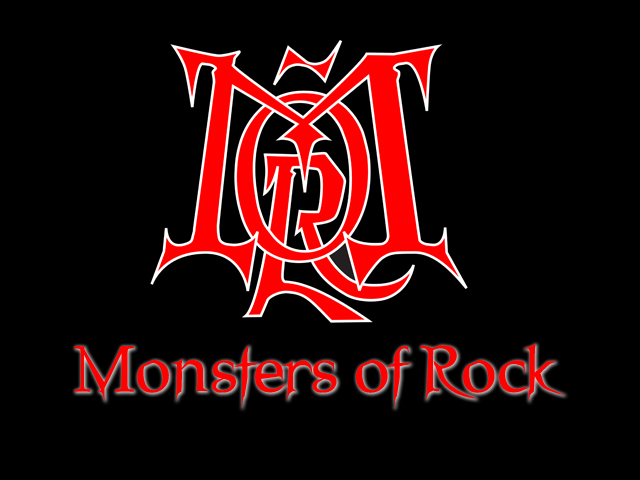
- Monsters of Rock official logo.

Background information
- Also known as: MOR or M.O.R.
- Origin: San Diego, California, U.S.
- Genres: Heavy metal, hard rock
- Years active: 2005–2017
- Past members: Gavin O'Hara; Sergio Estrada; David Kendall; Roger Estrada; A.J. Wolfe, Jeff Sheets, Tom Hogue, Jerry Fluery, Ron Lerma
- Website: Monsters of Rock

Monsters of Rock was an American tribute band formed in San Diego, California, United States, in March 2005. They were billed as "San Diego's Ultimate Metal Tribute Band."

== Background ==
Monsters of Rock were a San Diego–based multi-metal tribute act dedicated to performing the songs of the well-known metal bands that dominated the 1970s, 1980s, and 1990s—especially bands that performed in England's "Monsters of Rock" festivals. The Monsters of Rock paid tribute to bands like Iron Maiden, Judas Priest, Queensryche, Black Sabbath, Ozzy Osbourne and many others.

Monsters of Rock performed in venues within the Southern California area and received a third place award and a $4,000 cash prize in the "Ultimate Music Challenge 2: Battle of the Cover Bands" at Viejas Casino in Alpine, California, on August 3, 2008.

Monsters of Rock also competed the following year in the "Ultimate Music Challenge 3: Battle of the Cover Bands" at Viejas Casino in Alpine, California on July 8, 2009, winning second place and a $8,000 cash prize. (Note: San Diego City Beat ceased publication in 2019).

== History ==
Monsters of Rock originally formed in February 2005 by bassist Jeff Sheets (formerly of Hunter), lead guitarist Gavin O'Hara (formerly of Sabotage, Street Liegel, and Sinor), drummer A.J. Wolfe, and lead vocalist Ron Lerma (formerly of Piece of Mind, Deeper Purple, and Teabag). Jeff Sheets, Gavin O'Hara, and A.J. Wolfe were all formerly in the band Wolfgaard in 2004 playing originals and covers. The band name was changed from Wolfgaard to Monsters of Rock when Ron Lerma joined the group and suggested the name change. Ron was also involved in an original project with the band Sator Square at the time of Monsters of Rock's formation.

In April 2005, A.J. Wolfe accepted a job offer and relocated to Oregon. He was replaced by Tom Hogue (formerly of Cynical Man and Malady who are presently known as Benedictum and have since released three albums/CDs in Europe). Eventually the band decided that they would need a second guitarist to fill out their sound. After auditioning several candidates, they recruited lead guitarist Sergio Estrada (formerly of Sweet Vengeance) in mid-April 2005.

The members of this line up all brought previous experience having played alongside acts such as Quiet Riot, Ratt, Great White, Motörhead, and others at such San Diego venues as the Bacchanal, Rio's, Straita Head Sound, 4th&B, and Brick by Brick (formerly "The Spirit Club"). While they were playing original material at these venues in hopes of a recording contract, this time around the purpose of their band was to play heavy metal covers that influenced them to become musicians in the first place.

In May 2006, due to musical differences, Jeff Sheets left the band. Bass player Dave Kendall (formerly of The Spoilers and The Late Edition) joined the band the same month. Kendall was a friend of both Tom Hogue and Sergio Estrada dating back to high school. In May 2010, Tom Hogue also left the band. He was initially replaced by Jerry Fluery (formerly of 6one9 and Black Diamond w/Gavin O'Hara back in 1983). Fluery had to quit the band due to work constraints and was replaced by Sergio's brother, Roger Estrada in September 2010. In May 2014, the band parted ways with lead vocalist, Ron Lerma. After unsuccessful attempts of finding a full-time replacement lead singer, the band decided to utilize other guest lead vocalists to fulfill their contractual obligations for the remainder of 2014. Since all four of the remaining members were currently in three different bands, the Monsters band scaled back to doing quarterly shows between 2015 and 2017.

Since 2008, the band had been playing venues, such as House of Blues, The Belly Up Tavern, Paladinos, and were a house band at the Second Wind Bars in Santee and San Carlos, California. They prided themselves in filling a void not too many bands provide which is playing classic heavy metal covers. They shared the stage with many nationally and internationally known tribute and original music acts such as The Iron Maidens, The Atomic Punks, Wild Child, Damage Inc, ThundHerStruck, Lights, Steel Panther, and Pearl Aday.

The band came to a sudden halt with the death of one of its long-standing members, Sergio Estrada, on October 1, 2017. The Monsters of Rock band had to cancel their final show, already booked for later in October, when Sergio was first hospitalized in early September 2017.

== Final members ==
Gavin O'Hara – Lead guitar and backing vocals (2005–2017)
Roger Estrada – Drums (2010–2017)
Sergio Estrada – Lead guitar and backing vocals (2005–2017) [RIP]
Dave Kendall – Bass guitar and backing vocals (2006–2017)

== Former members ==
Ron Lerma – Lead vocals (2005–2014)
A.J. Wolfe – Drums (2005)
Jeff Sheets – Bass guitar and backing vocals (2005–2006)
Tom Hogue – Drums and backing vocals (2005–2010)
Jerry Fluery – Drums (2010)

== Guest lead vocalists ==
=== 2014–2017 ===
Lauri Randall Vreeland (Current band: Ophelia Vibe, formerly of Relax Max)
Greg Rupp (Current bands: 6ONE9, 8FIVE8)
Trent Slatton (formerly of Hell Bent, Jane's Diction)
Deb DiMaggio (formerly of Get Groovin), (deceased)
Joey Molina (Classic Buzz)
Gary Pacini (Current band: Mother America, formerly of Rammoth)
Mark Griffin (Current band: Bastard Sons, formerly of Serious Guise)
Mike Griffin (Current band: Bastard Sons, formerly of Serious Guise)
Tommy Inglehorn (Current band: Armageddon, formerly of One Night in the City)
Shamini Jain (formerly of Nuns N Moses, Up The Irons)
Michele Whitlow (Current bands: The Big Lewinsky, Up The Irons)

== Guest bassists ==
John Osmon (Formerly of Relax Max, Deeper Purple)
Jim Mills (Formerly of Sanctuary, Bone Yard, Van Roth)
