= Mosdeux =

Deaf owned film studio

- Mosdeux logo
- Industry: Motion pictures
- Founded: 2005
- Headquarters: U.S.
- Owner: Wayne Betts, Jr. and Chad W. Taylor

Mosdeux was a deaf owned film studio which developed, produced and distributed film. It produced several feature and short films targeting the deaf and hard of hearing communities.

The deaf founders, Chad W. Taylor and Wayne Betts, Jr. established Mosdeux in January 2005 to bring the cinematic perspective to the deaf community with stories originating from the deaf community.

== History ==
Chad W. Taylor attended Rochester Institute of Technology and graduated with a degree in Information Technology. During the same time, Wayne Betts, Jr. was entering school, majoring in Film and Animation.

The duo first met when they were involved in a play titled See How They Run at National Technical Institute for the Deaf (NTID). They learned about their keen interest in movies.

Over the time, they stayed in touch and Chad started his career in the Video Relay Service industry, working for Sprint Relay as a Product Development Manager. Shortly thereafter, he moved to Hands On Video Relay Services as a Software Engineer.

Thanks to technology, Chad and Wayne continued to stay in touch using video conferencing. One night, they decided to form a company, thus came up with Mosdeux.

While Chad was working for Hands On Video Relay Services, the company needed a showcase promotional video. He thought of Betts, who was still a student at RIT. Betts flew out to California to shoot the video and never looked back. Wayne landed a job with the company as a marketing director and produced a couple promotional videos alongside Chad, such as The Taste of HOVRS and the Santa Claus commercial. Wayne also produced several other HOVRS-related videos that were fiercely popular within the deaf community.

== Logo ==
The logo symbolizes the deafness aspect of the owners. Having a microphone broken into two pieces represents breaking through the sound barrier, Chad and Wayne were able to break through the barrier by producing several highly acclaimed films.

== Filmography ==
=== Feature films ===
Title	Year	Notes
A Permanent Grave	2007	Directed by Wayne Betts, Jr. Written by DJ Kurs
The Deaf Family	2008	Directed by Chad W. Taylor. Written by DJ Kurs
The Caretaker	2009	Directed by Wayne Betts, Jr. Written by DJ Kurs

=== Short films ===
Title	Year	Notes
Till Domestic Violence Do Us Part	2005	Educational film produced for DeafHope
Vital Signs	2006	Showcased in PBS' documentary, 'History Through Deaf Eyes'
Rest in Peace	2006	Educational film produced for DeafHope (sequel)
Resonare	2007	
3,000 Miles Away	2007	A political message contributing to the Gallaudet United Now Movement
You Must Not Quit	2007	A political message contributing to the Gallaudet United Now Movement
Let's Meet Gideon	2007	A political message contributing to the Gallaudet United Now Movement
