= Marian Gleason =

American politician

Member of the Washington House of Representatives from the 27th district
- In office 1957–1964

Personal details
- Born: November 25, 1916 Seattle, Washington
- Died: June 4, 2005 (aged 88)
- Party: Democratic

Marion C. Gleason (November 25, 1916 – June 4, 2005) was an American politician. She was a Democrat, representing District 27 in the Washington House of Representatives which included Pierce County, from 1957 to 1964.
