= Isaie Louis =

American soccer player (born 2005)

Personal information
- Full name: Isaie Louis
- Date of birth: January 18, 2005 (age 21)
- Place of birth: Haiti
- Height: 5 ft 10 in (1.78 m)
- Position: Forward

Youth career
- 2019–2022: New England Revolution

College career
Years	Team	Apps	(Gls)
2022	San Diego State Aztecs	17	(0)

Senior career*
Years	Team	Apps	(Gls)
2020–2022	New England Revolution II	4	(0)
2023	Athlone Town	10	(1)
- * Club domestic league appearances and goals as of 16:29, 25 March 2024 (UTC)

Isaie Louis (born January 18, 2005) is an American professional soccer player who plays as a forward.

== Career ==
=== Youth ===
Louis joined the New England Revolution academy in 2019 from Valeo FC.

In 2020, Louis spent time with the club's USL League One affiliate team New England Revolution II. He made his debut on September 9, 2020, appearing as an 87th-minute substitute during a 2–1 loss to Chattanooga Red Wolves.
