= Dean S. Laird =

American Naval officer (1921–2022)

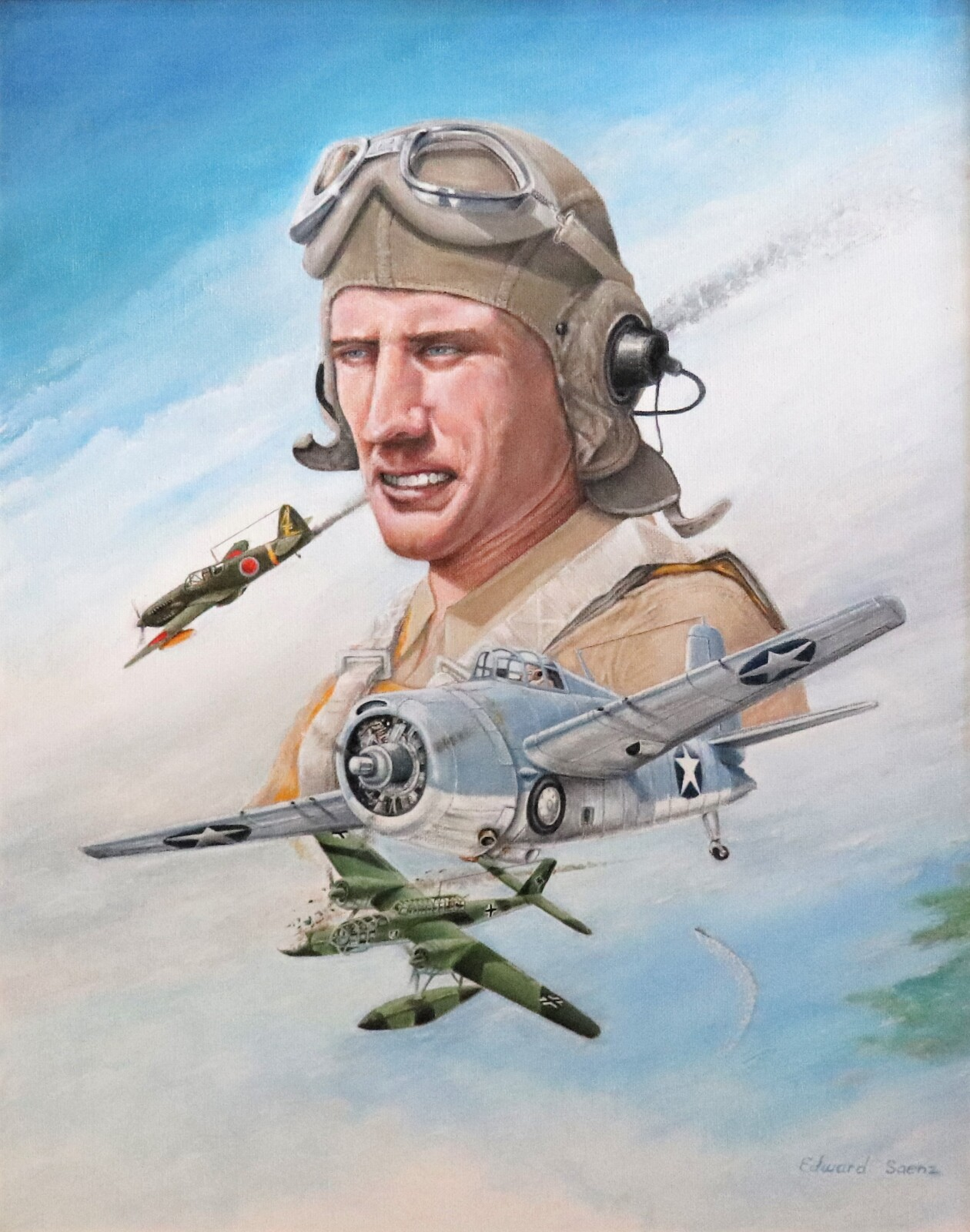
- Portrait by Edward Saenz
- Born: Dean Samuel Laird; February 7, 1921; Loomis, California, U.S.
- Died: August 10, 2022 (aged 101); Walnut Creek, California
- Military career
- Allegiance: United States
- Branch: United States Navy
- Service years: 1942–1971
- Rank: Commander
- Nickname: Diz
- Units: VF-4; VF-200
- Commands: VF-213
- Conflicts: World War II; Korean War; Vietnam War
- Awards: Distinguished Flying Cross

Dean Samuel Laird (February 7, 1921 – August 10, 2022) was the only U.S. Navy ace to have combat victories in both the Pacific and European theaters of World War II. He served in World War II, the Korean War, and the Vietnam War, and is given credit for 5.75 aerial victories. Laird flew 138 fighter missions during World War II. and was awarded the Distinguished Flying Cross and the Congressional Gold Medal, among other honors.

== Career ==
One week after the Japanese attack on Pearl Harbor on December 7, 1941, Laird drove to San Francisco to enlist. Laird entered the U.S. Navy cadet program. On August 11, 1942, he became a commissioned officer. In NAS Miami, Florida, on October 21, 1942, he became a Naval Aviator. Laird shot down 5.75 enemy aircraft in combat and he damaged an additional plane. Two of his kills were German planes: A Ju 88 and a He 115 in October 1943 near Norway. The other kills were Japanese planes so Laird has the distinction of being the only Navy ace to have scored air victories against both Germany and Japan. He flew F4F Wildcat and then F6F Hellcats and was assigned from November 1942 to March 1943, to the aircraft carrier USS Ranger (CV-4). November 1944 to March 1945 he was assigned to the USS Essex (CV-9).

In December 1944, Laird was almost shot down. His F6F Hellcat was riddled with bullets over the Philippines, but he was able to pilot the plane back to the USS Essex which was 250 miles away. His landing gear did not work and Laird landed the plane skidding on its bottom across the deck of the aircraft carrier USS Essex.

He received the Distinguished Flying Cross for his actions on February 7, 1945. Laird was escorting bomber planes which were attacking heavily defended Japanese aircraft engine factories. He shot down two Japanese planes during that mission near Tokyo, Japan.

When Laird was 93 years old, he was one of 35 Aces to travel to the nation's capital and receive the Congressional Gold Medal recognizing the 1,450 Aces from all of the wars.

=== Film ===
In 1969, Laird became a motion picture pilot. He performed some of the aerial sequences in the 20th Century Fox film Tora! Tora! Tora!; he helped choreograph the reenactment of the attack on Pearl Harbor and was the lead stunt pilot. He was one of the three main pilots in the film and he flew approximately 164 hours during production.

== Personal life and death ==
Laird was born in Loomis, California, and grew up in Northern California. In 1958 he moved to Coronado, where he co-owned and operated the Coronado Municipal Golf Course restaurant; in 2015 he moved back north to Walnut Creek to be close to his daughter and her family. He turned 100 in February 2021, and died on August 10, 2022, at the age of 101.

== Awards ==
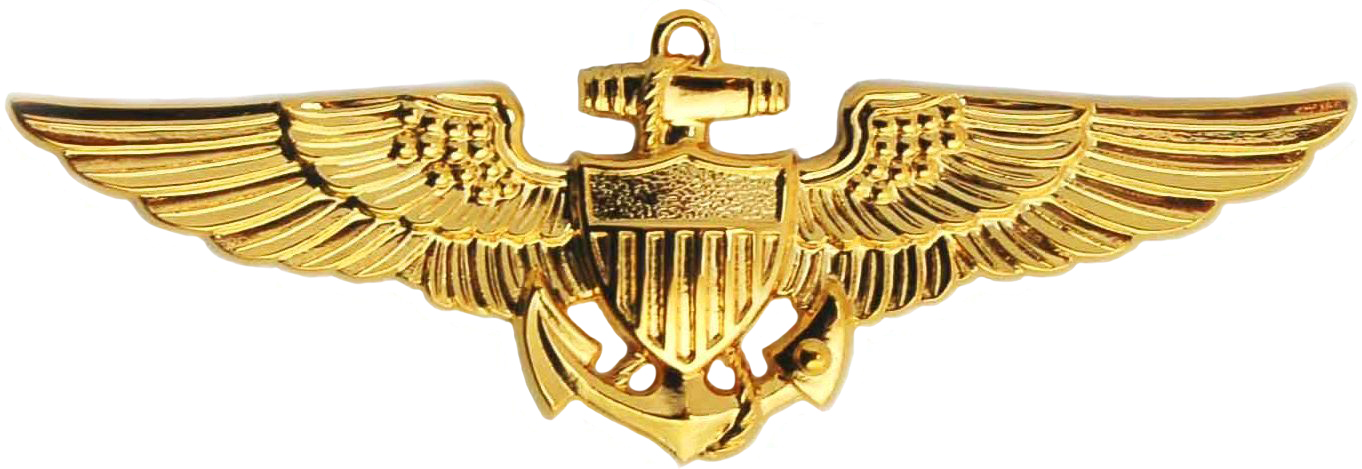

Naval Aviator Badge
Distinguished Flying Cross
Meritorious Service Medal	Air Medal w/ four 5/16" Gold Stars	Navy Presidential Unit Citation w/ two 3/16" Bronze Stars
China Service Medal	American Campaign Medal	European–African–Middle Eastern Campaign Medal w/ one 3/16" Bronze Star
Asiatic-Pacific Campaign Medal w/ three 3/16" Bronze Stars	World War II Victory Medal	National Defense Service Medal w/ one 3/16" Bronze Star
Korean Service Medal w/ two 3/16" Bronze Stars	United Nations Korea Medal	Korean War Service Medal

- Congressional Gold Medal (2015)
- Audie Murphy award presented by the American Veterans Center

=== Affiliations ===
He was a member of the American Fighter Aces Association, the Distinguished Flying Cross Society, and the Tailhook Association. The "QB" pilots association.

== See also ==
- List of World War II aces from the United States
- List of World War II flying aces
