= Herbert N. Houck =

United States Navy pilot

Herbert Norman Houck
- Born: April 2, 1915; Corona, Minnesota, US
- Died: February 24, 2002 (aged 86) Cape Coral, Florida, US
- Buried: Arlington National Cemetery
- Allegiance: United States
- Branch: United States Navy
- Service years: 1936–1968
- Rank: Captain
- Conflicts: World War II: Bombing of Rabaul; Operation Hailstone; Battle of Okinawa; Korean War; Vietnam War
- Awards: Navy Cross (3); Silver Star; Distinguished Flying Cross (4); Bronze Star; Air Medal (9)

Herbert Norman Houck (April 2, 1915 – February 24, 2002) was a highly decorated United States Navy pilot with the rank of captain. During World War II, he became a flying ace with six aerial victories and was awarded three Navy Crosses.

== Early life and service ==
Herbert N. Houck was born on April 2, 1915, in Corona, Minnesota. After graduating from high school, he attended the University of Minnesota for three years. Houck went into the Navy in 1936 and was designated as a Naval Aviator.

== World War II ==
When the United States became involved in World War II, Houck was assigned to Fighting Squadron 9 (VF-9). On June 30, 1943, Lieutenant Houck was flying an F6F Hellcat over Pearl Harbor, Hawaii, when he was involved in a mid-air collision with another Hellcat pilot. Houck successfully bailed out while the other pilot was killed.

In September 1943, VF-9 embarked on the USS Essex and left Pearl Harbor to partake in combat operations in the Pacific Theater. On November 11, 1943, Lieutenant Commander Houck, who was now the executive officer of the squadron, led other pilots in a preliminary attack at Rabaul Harbor, New Britain, strafing Japanese shore batteries and ships while under heavy anti-aircraft fire. Later that day, he shot down three Japanese aircraft and assisted in shooting down two others which were attacking friendly ships. For his actions that day, Houck was awarded his first Navy Cross.

=== Operation Hailstone ===
Lieutenant Commander Houck would be awarded his second Navy Cross for his actions on February 16, 1944. In the early morning hours of that date, he led his squadron in the first attack against Japanese-held Truk Atoll, Carolina Islands. VF-9 made repeated strafing attacks on parked enemy planes on the Param airfield and at the Moen seaplane base.

Houck personally accounted for six of the 27 planes destroyed despite heavy anti-aircraft fire. Additionally, his squadron shot down 21 fighter planes which were attempting to intercept them, with Houck claiming two of these planes, attaining ace status. Later on that same day, Houck led a fighter group which escorted dive bombers and torpedo bombers to Truk Atoll. Houck's fighters attracted the majority of the anti-aircraft fire by strafing enemy ships and the airfield at Eten Island prior to the bombing attack.

=== Battle of Okinawa ===
On April 1, 1945, American troops invaded Okinawa. VF-9, now attached to the USS Yorktown, helped provide Naval air support during the operation. On April 6, the largest battleship ever built, the Yamato, left its home port at Kure, Japan, sailing towards Okinawa. The Yamato was travelling with nine other ships, however they had no air support and lacked sufficient fuel to return to mainland Japan once they reached Okinawa. The ships were essentially on a suicide mission. On April 7, the ships were spotted and attacked by several waves of American aircraft in the East China Sea off Kyushu.

Lieutenant Commander Houck led over 40 torpedo bombers towards the enemy convoy through inclement weather, during which his plane experienced a partial engine failure and he was almost forced to turn back. Upon reaching the enemy ships, Houck's squadron attacked numerous ships under heavy anti-aircraft fire. He led several planes in an attack on the Yamato, striking the battleship with several torpedoes. The Yamato capsized shortly afterwards and exploded, killing more than 2,500 crew members. Houck took several photographs with his wing camera and his squadron also sunk the cruiser Yahagi, essentially marking the end of the Imperial Japanese Navy. Houck was awarded his third and final Navy Cross for his actions.

== Later career and life ==
Houck stayed in the Navy after the war and served in the Korean War before he was promoted to captain in 1956. He served as the commanding officer of the USS Shangri-La from 1960 to 1961. Also serving during the Vietnam War, Captain Houck ultimately retired in 1968.

Herbert N. Houck died on February 24, 2002, in Cape Coral, Florida. He was buried in Arlington National Cemetery.

== Awards and honors ==

Naval Aviator insignia
Navy Cross w/ two 5/16" gold stars
Silver Star	Distinguished Flying Cross w/ three 5/16" gold stars	Bronze Star Medal w/ Combat 'V'
Air Medal w/ one silver and three gold 5/16" stars	Navy Presidential Unit Citation w/ three 3/16" bronze stars	Combat Action Ribbon
China Service Medal	American Defense Service Medal w/ Fleet Clasp (3/16" Bronze Star)	American Campaign Medal
Asiatic–Pacific Campaign Medal w/ one silver and two bronze 3/16" stars	World War II Victory Medal	National Defense Service Medal w/ 3/16" bronze star
Korean Service Medal w/ two 3/16" bronze stars	United Nations Service Medal	Korean War Service Medal

=== 1st Navy Cross citation ===

Commander [then Lieutenant Commander] Hebert Norman Houk
U.S. Navy
Date Of Action: November 11, 1943

The President of the United States of America takes pleasure in presenting the Navy Cross to Commander [then Lieutenant Commander] Herbert Norman Houck, United States Naval Reserve, for extraordinary heroism as Pilot of a Navy Fighter Plane and Executive Officer and Division Leader of Fighting Squadron NINE (VF-9), attached to the USS ESSEX (CV-9), during operations against enemy Japanese forces at Rabaul Harbor, New Britain, on 11 November 1943. Preceding our bomber formations, commander Houck joined other members of his squadron in strafing the enemy’s powerful shore batteries and combatant ships in the harbor and, defying the tremendous concentration of anti-aircraft fire in the Harbor area and the repeated onslaughts of intercepting enemy planes, aided materially in coordinating the efforts of our fighters and bombing attack. Later the same day, Commander Houck led a flight of fighters against counter-attacking Japanese aircraft striking at our Task Force and personally destroyed three of the enemy in addition to assisting in the destruction of two others. By his leadership, skill and aggressiveness, Commander Houck contributed materially to the defense of our Task Force. His conduct throughout upheld the highest traditions of the United States Naval Service.

=== 2nd Navy Cross citation ===

Lieutenant Commander Hebert Norman Houk
U.S. Navy
Date Of Action: February 16, 1944

The President of the United States of America takes pleasure in presenting a Gold Star in lieu of a Second Award of the Navy Cross to Lieutenant Commander Herbert Norman Houck, United States Naval Reserve, for extraordinary heroism and outstanding performance in aerial flight against the enemy while serving as Pilot of a carrier-based Navy Fighter Plane and Commanding Officer of Fighting Squadron NINE (VF-9), attached to the USS ESSEX (CV-9), in action on 16 February 1944, at Truk in the Caroline Islands. Lieutenant Commander Houck led his squadron in a pre-dawn attack against the Japanese stronghold in Truk Atoll, Caroline Islands. This was the first strike of World War II against this great keystone of the Japanese inner line of defenses. In the semi-light of early morning his squadron made repeated strafing attacks on grounded enemy planes at Param bomber strip and Moen seaplane base. Despite enemy fighter interception and in the face of heavy, accurate anti-aircraft fire, these attacks were pressed home and resulted in the destruction of twenty-seven planes on the ground with many more damaged. He accounted for six of the planes destroyed. In addition, twenty-one of the attacking Japanese fighters were shot down by his squadron. Two of these were shot down by Lieutenant Commander Houck himself. Later that same day, he led a group of fighters as escort for dive bombers and torpedo planes that attacked Japanese naval and merchant shipping in Truk Atoll. In the face of extremely heavy and accurate anti-aircraft fire, his escort group preceded the bombing attack by strafing enemy ships and the airfield at Eten Island, thereby diverting anti-aircraft fire from the bombers and causing extensive damage to ships, grounded aircraft and base facilities. His leadership, courage and individual actions contributed greatly to the success of the mission as a whole and were in keeping with the highest traditions of the United States Naval Service.

=== 3rd Navy Cross citation ===

Lieutenant Commander Hebert Norman Houk
U.S. Navy
Date Of Action: April 7, 1945

The President of the United States of America takes pleasure in presenting a Second Gold Star in lieu of a Third Award of the Navy Cross to Lieutenant Commander Herbert Norman Houck, United States Naval Reserve, for extraordinary heroism in operations against the enemy while serving as Pilot of a carrier-based Navy Fighter Plane and Flight Leader in Fighting Squadron NINE (VF-9), attached to the USS YORKTOWN (CV-10), in action against major elements of the Japanese Fleet on 7 April 1945, in the East China Sea off Kyushu, Japan. Through exceedingly adverse weather, during which his plane experienced partial engine failure, Lieutenant Commander Houck skillfully directed his group of carrier-based planes to the enemy force of a battleship, a light cruiser, and six destroyers. In the face of intense anti-aircraft fire, he directed and participated in an attack which terminated with complete destruction of the battleship and cruiser and serious damage to several destroyers. In addition to scoring a direct bomb hit on the destroyer, he photographed the sinking of both warships. His leadership, outstanding skill and intrepidity were at all times in keeping with the highest traditions of the United States Naval Service.
