= Joseph C. Clifton =

Joseph Clinton Clifton
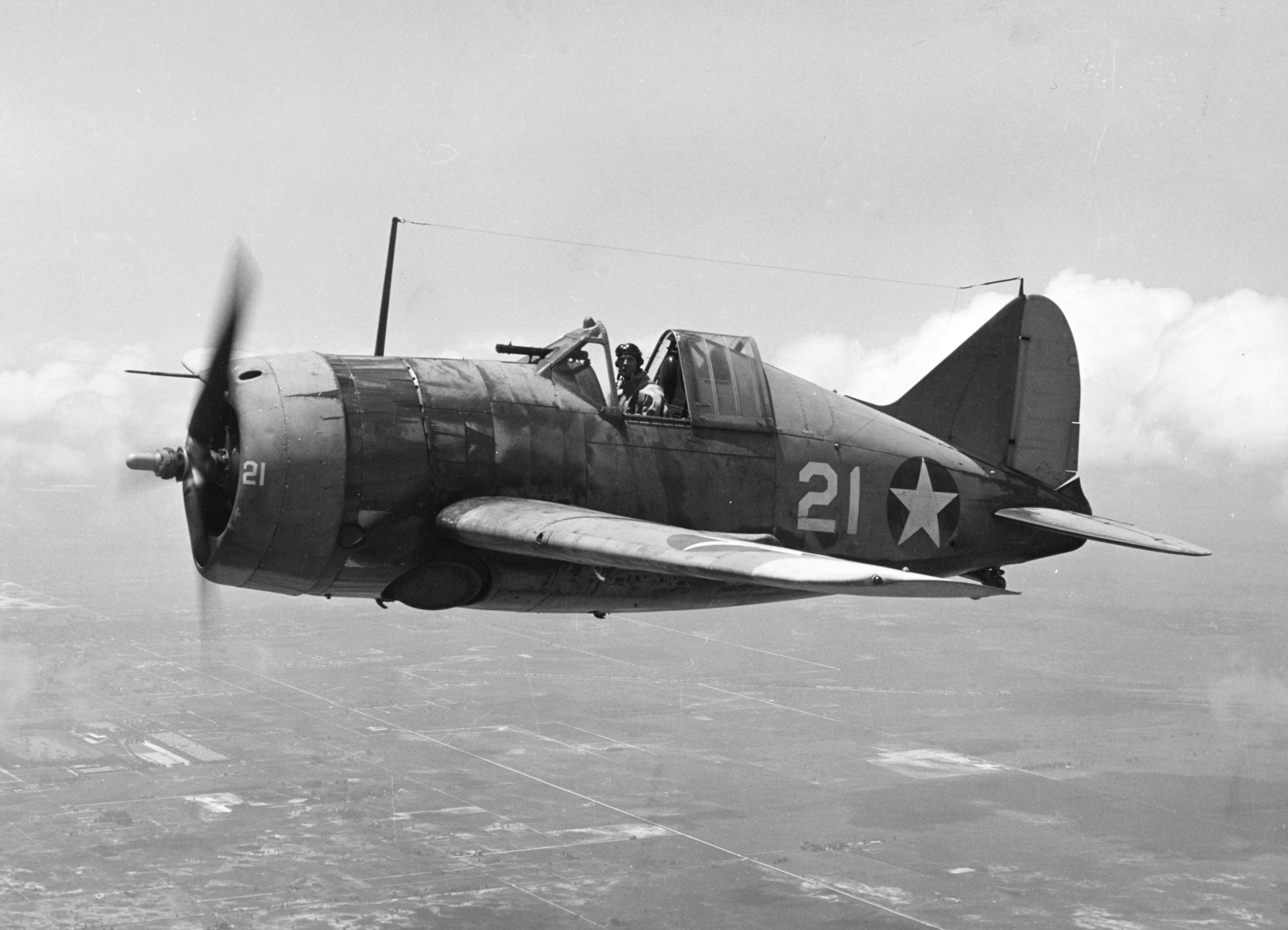
- Lt.Cdr. Joseph C. Clifton in his F2A Buffalo, August 1942
- Born: October 31, 1908; Paducah, Kentucky
- Died: December 24, 1967 (aged 59); Santa Monica, California
- Military career
- Allegiance: United States
- Branch: United States Navy
- Service years: 1930–1963
- Rank: Rear admiral
- Nickname: Jumping Joe
- Commands: Fighter Squadron 12; Air Group 12; Wasp (CV-18); Transport Squadron 8 Corson (AVP-37); Carrier Division 7
- Conflicts: World War II; Korean War
- Awards: Distinguished Flying Cross (2); Legion of Merit (2); Air Medal; Distinguished Service Order (UK)

Joseph Clinton Clifton (October 31, 1908 – December 24, 1967) was a naval officer and aviator of the United States Navy in World War II, ultimately advancing to the rank of rear admiral before his retirement in 1963.

== Biography ==
Clifton was born in Paducah, Kentucky. He attended the University of Kentucky in 1926 and graduated from the United States Naval Academy, where he was an All-Eastern fullback, in 1930. Clifton was assigned to the battleship Tennessee (BB-43) and was designated a Naval Aviator in 1932.

He served with a number of ships and flying squadrons, including the VF-2 "Flying Chiefs". From 1942 until 1944, he commanded the VF-12 "Peg Legs" flying F4U Corsairs and later F6F Hellcats from Saratoga (CV-3). During this period, he flew a captured A6M2 Zero, obtaining valuable technical data that was used to refine fighter tactics against the Japanese.

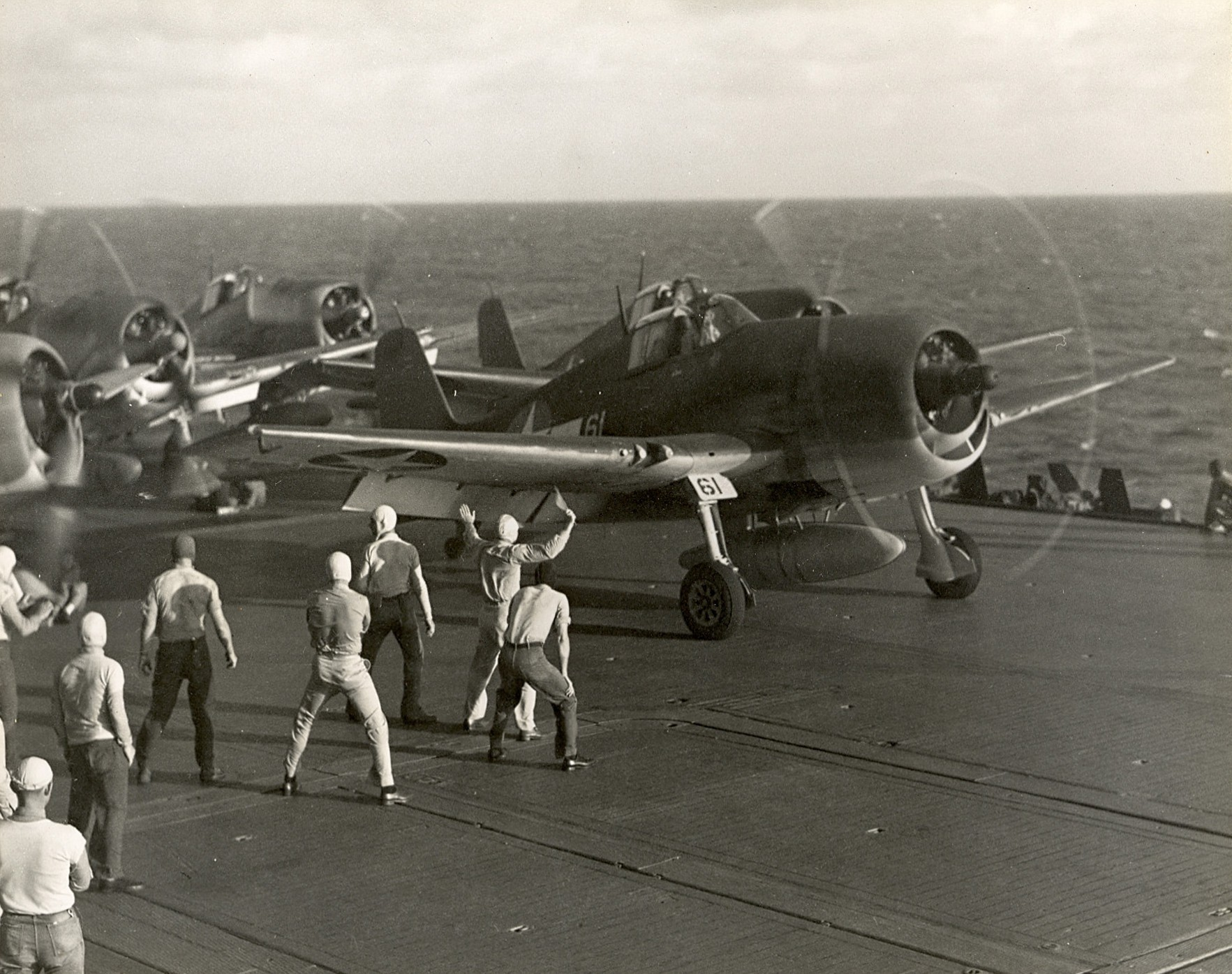
Cdr. Clifton taking off from Saratoga to strike Tarawa, November 1943.

In 1944, Clifton was named Commander of Air Group 12, which combined air groups from HMS Illustrious and Saratoga. He led the joint British-American air attack force during the Operation Cockpit raid on Sabang.

In 1945, he was officer-in-charge of fighter indoctrination in Advanced Training, at Naval Air Station, Green Cove Springs, Florida. In 1945–46, he was executive officer and then commanding officer of Wasp (CV-18).

Clifton was assigned to the Air Warfare Division Office from 1946 to 1949, and the Fleet Logistics Support Wing, Pacific Area, 1949. He was the commander of Transport Squadron 8, 1948–51, also serving as commanding officer of the seaplane tender Corson (AVP-37) off Formosa during the Korean War.

Clifton was deputy chief of staff training and Staff Commander, Air Forces, Pacific Fleet, 1952–53; attended the Naval War College Class of 1954; commander of Naval Air Station Memphis, 1954–56; and commander of Barrier Atlantic, and also Airborne Early Warning Wing Atlantic and Fleet Air Detachment, Argentia, 1956–58. From 1958 to 1960, he headed the Naval Air Advanced Training Command, and in 1960 commanded Carrier Division 7, the Seventh Fleet. He was chief of naval air technical training at Memphis before finally retiring in July 1963.

After retirement, he became associated with Litton Industries in Beverly Hills, California.

Clifton died following complications from diabetes on Christmas Eve, 1967, in Santa Monica, California.

Clifton's life is commemorated with a street bearing his name in his hometown of Paducah, Kentucky.

== Awards ==
For his service in World War II, Clifton was awarded the Distinguished Flying Cross, with gold star, the Legion of Merit twice, the Air Medal, and the British Distinguished Service Order.

He was named to the University of Kentucky Hall of Distinguished Alumni in February 1965, and to the Naval Aviation Hall of Honor in 1996.

== Joseph C. Clifton Award ==
The Joseph C. Clifton Trophy was awarded for the first time in 1968, to VF-51. The award recognizes meritorious achievement by a fighter squadron while deployed aboard a carrier.

The award is in memory of Rear Admiral Clifton, who distinguished himself as a fighter pilot during World War II. His heroism and extraordinary achievements in flight paralleled the aggressive attitude and drive and inspiring leadership he displayed throughout his life. This award recognizes meritorious achievement by a fighter squadron. The trophy, sponsored by Litton Industries, is a 22-inch high hand repoussé silver bowl on a walnut base.
