= VF-12 =

Fighter Squadron 12
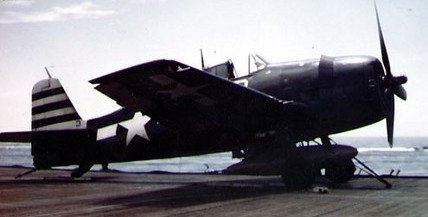
- VF-12 F6F-5 on USS Randolph in 1945
- Active: 9 January 1943 – 17 September 1945
- Country: United States
- Branch: United States Navy
- Type: Fighter
- Engagements: World War II

Insignia
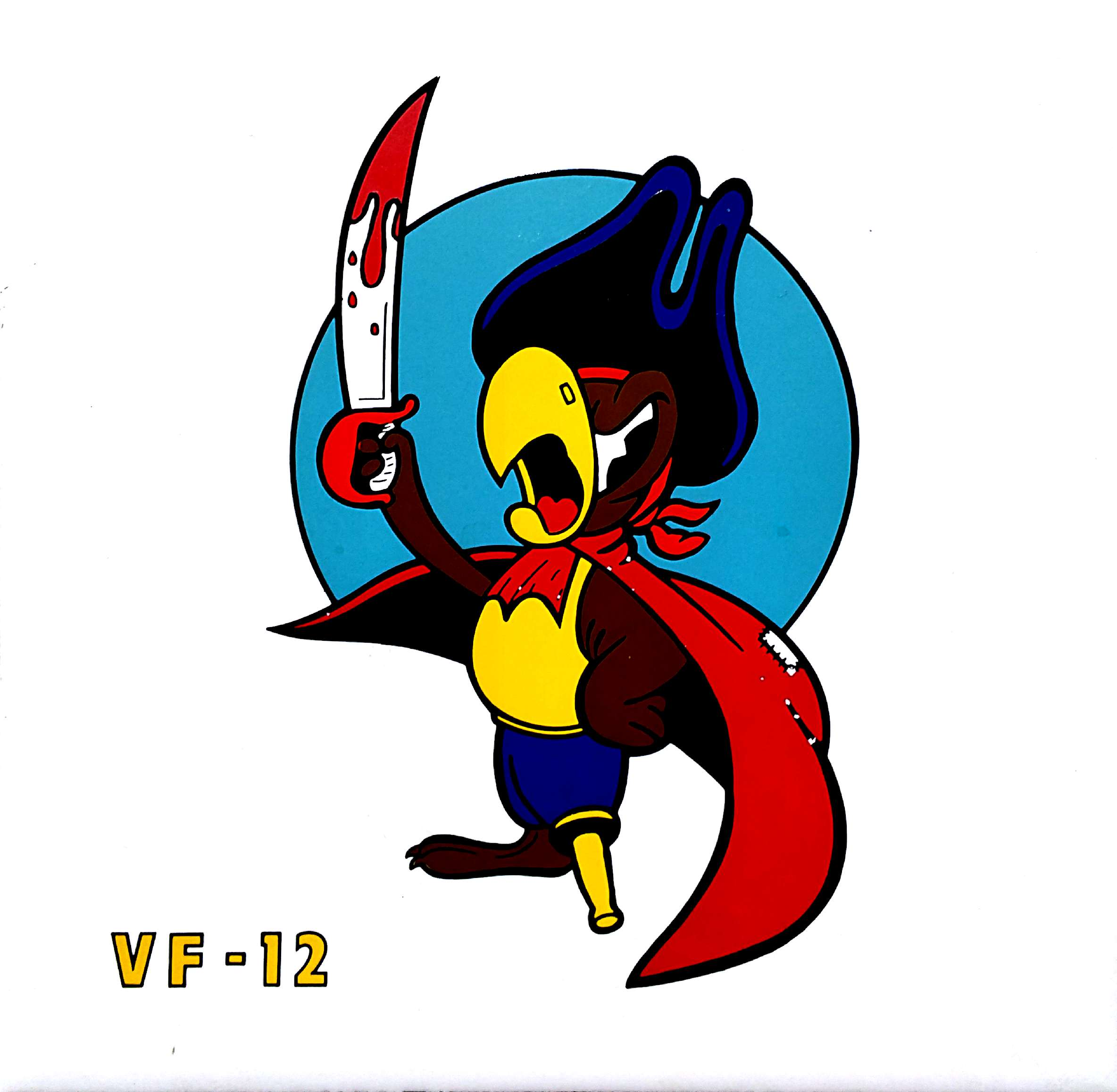
- Identification symbol

Aircraft flown
- Fighter: F6F-3/5 Hellcat

Fighter Squadron 12 or VF-12 was an aviation unit of the United States Navy. Originally established on 9 January 1943, it was disestablished on 17 September 1945. It was the first US Navy squadron to be designated as VF-12.

== Operational history ==
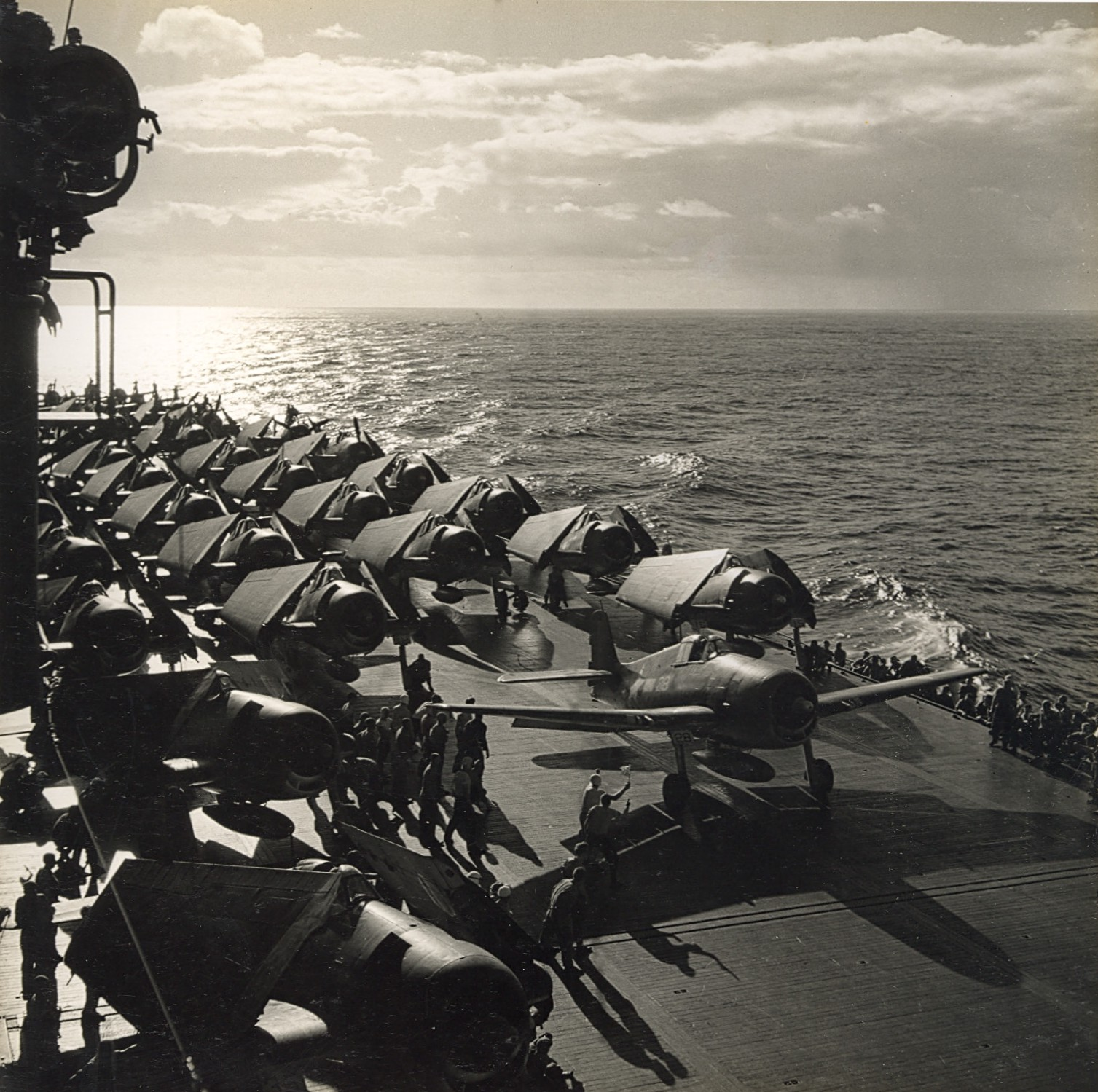
VF-12 F6F-3 launches from USS Saratoga in 1943

VF-12 equipped with F6F-3 Hellcats formed part of Carrier Air Group 12 (CAG-12) and was assigned to USS Saratoga, flying aboard on 1 August 1943. CAG-12 supported the Battle of the Treasury Islands from October-November before the Saratoga returned to Pearl Harbor on 30 November.

In January 1944 CAG-12 rejoined the Saratoga and supported the later phases of the Gilbert and Marshall Islands campaign and then carried out attacks against Japanese forces in the Indian Ocean before returning to Pearl Harbor in June.

In January 1945 VF-12 was assigned to USS Randolph and supported the Invasion of Iwo Jima and raids on the Japanese home islands.

== Notable former members ==
- Joseph C. (Jumpin' Joe) Clifton
- Robert Dose
- Hamilton McWhorter
- Charles R. (Babe) Winterrowd

• Marvin Harper

== See also ==
- History of the United States Navy
- List of inactive United States Navy aircraft squadrons
- List of United States Navy aircraft squadrons
