= Hamilton McWhorter III =

WWII Ace

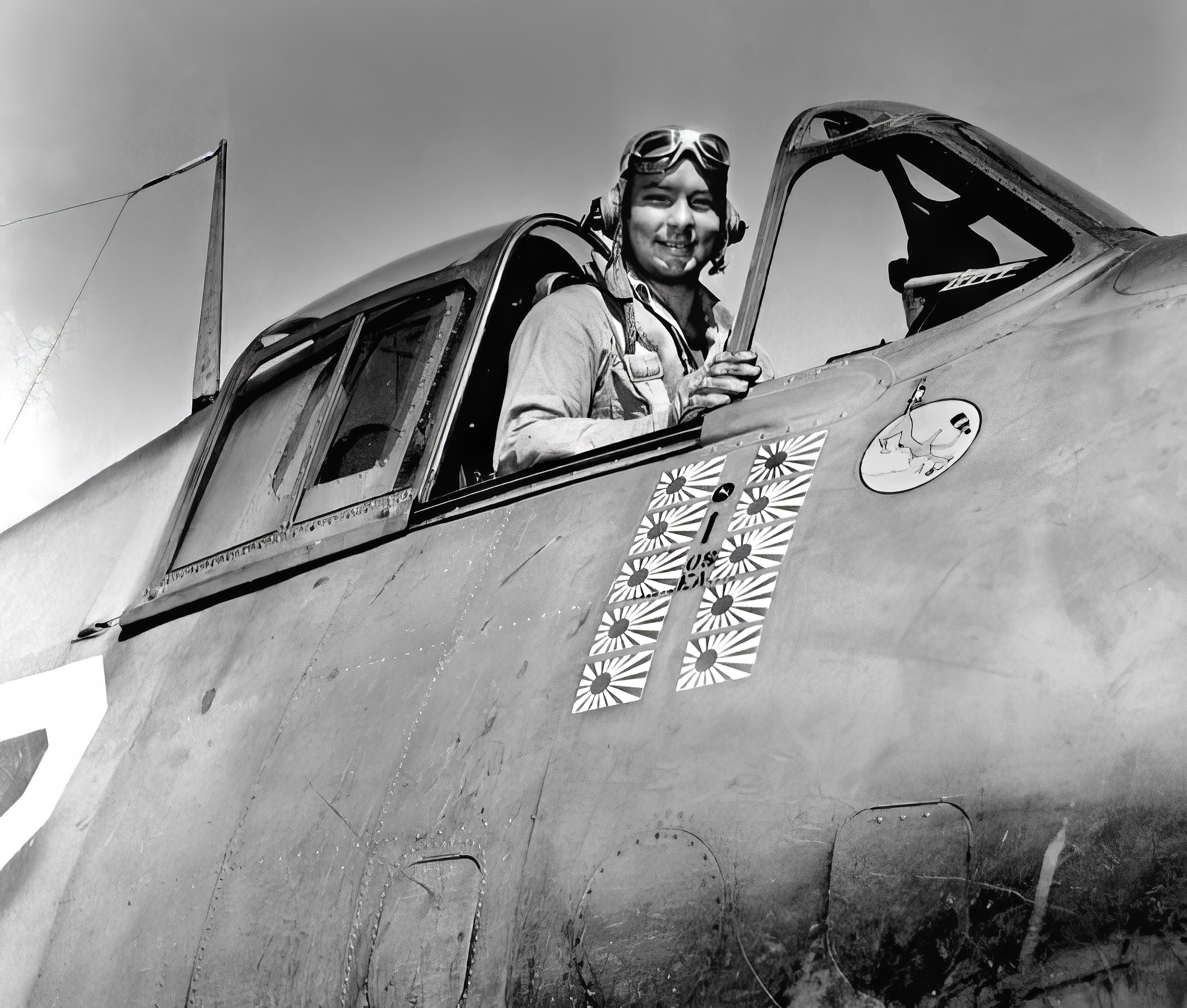
- Born: February 8, 1921; Athens, Georgia, US
- Died: April 12, 2008 (aged 87); El Cajon, California, US
- Burial place: Fort Rosecrans National Cemetery
- Relatives: Wife: Louise (Née Edel) McWhorter
- Military career
- Allegiance: United States of America
- Branch: United States Navy
- Service years: 1942 to 1969
- Rank: Commander
- Nicknames: "Mac", "One Slug"
- Units: VF-9; VF-12
- Commands: VF-12
- Conflicts: World War II: Operation Torch; Operation Galvanic; Operation Flintlock; Operation Hailstone; Operation Detachment; Operation Iceberg
- Awards: Congressional Gold Medal; Distinguished Flying Cross (5); Air Medal (7); Georgia Aviation Hall of Fame

Commander Hamilton McWhorter III (February 8, 1921 – April 12, 2008) was a United States Navy aviator and a flying ace of World War II, credited with shooting down twelve Japanese aircraft. He was the first Hellcat ace, first USN carrier-based double ace, and the first Grumman F6F Hellcat pilot to achieve double ace status. He flew 89 combat missions during World War II while flying with the VF-9 and VF-12 units. On May 23, 2014, he was also posthumously awarded the American Fighter Aces Congressional Gold Medal, when the United States Congress collectively awarded the gold medal to all flying aces: a navy pilot is depicted on the medal in the upper right.

== Early life and education ==
Hamilton McWhorter III was born in 1921 to a middle-class family. The family lived on a farm. When he was nine years old, his father got him on his first flight, which was in a Ford Tri-Motor. He was enrolled at the University of Georgia from 1939 to 1941. He attended Civilian Pilot Training in 1939 and entered the Navy flight program in August 1941.

== Navy career ==
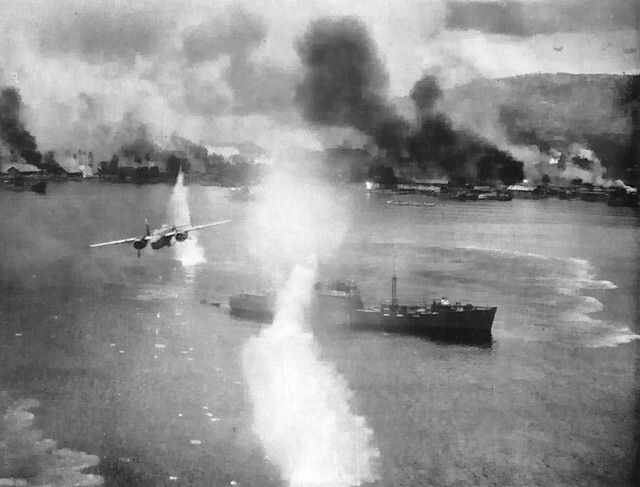
Japanese ship under attack during the air raid at Rabaul Harbor November 1943

McWhorter was selected for fighter training and arrived for training in Miami on December 24, 1941. He graduated from flight school on January 28, 1942, and was commissioned as an ensign on February 9. Advancing to carrier training on the F4F Wildcat at Naval Air Station Norfolk, McWhorter joined Fighting Squadron 9 (VF-9), based at East Field on NAS Norfolk, after completing the program in late April. In early October he and the squadron embarked aboard the USS Ranger for Operation Torch, the Allied invasion of Vichy French North Africa. McWhorter flew in an airstrike against Casablanca when the invasion began on November 8. After Vichy French resistance ceased, the Ranger returned to Norfolk. Based at nearby NAS Oceana from December, VF-9 converted to the new F6F-3 Hellcat in early 1943, among the first squadrons to receive them. McWhorter found the Hellcat a "dream to fly" and much superior to the Wildcat. During this period at Norfolk McWhorter met Louise Edel, the daughter of a Navy chaplain, and they married on January 16.

In May 1943 VF-9 departed for the Pacific Theater aboard the newly commissioned carrier USS Essex. He was nicknamed "One Slug" McWhorter after his first kill over Wake Island on October 5, 1943, when McWhorter flew into a formation of Japanese Zeroes and fired one .50-caliber bullet into the plane. The plane exploded and McWhorter earned his first enemy kill. The men in his unit said he was conserving the taxpayers' money by only firing one slug. McWhorter later stated that he only fired one shot because the plane blew up.

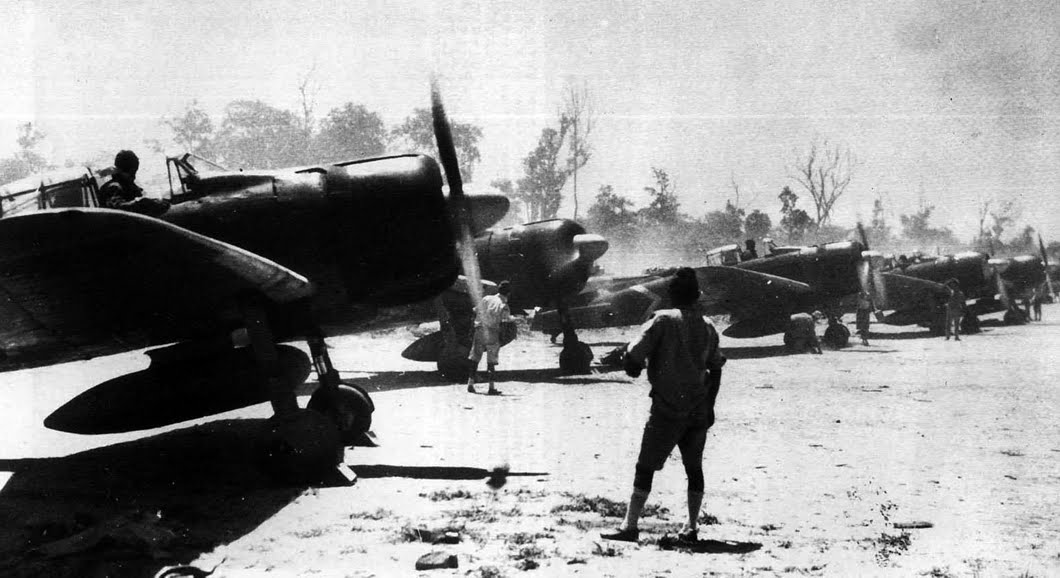
Japanese Mitsubishi A6M (Zeros) from the Japanese aircraft Zuikaku preparing to take off at Rabaul, November 1943

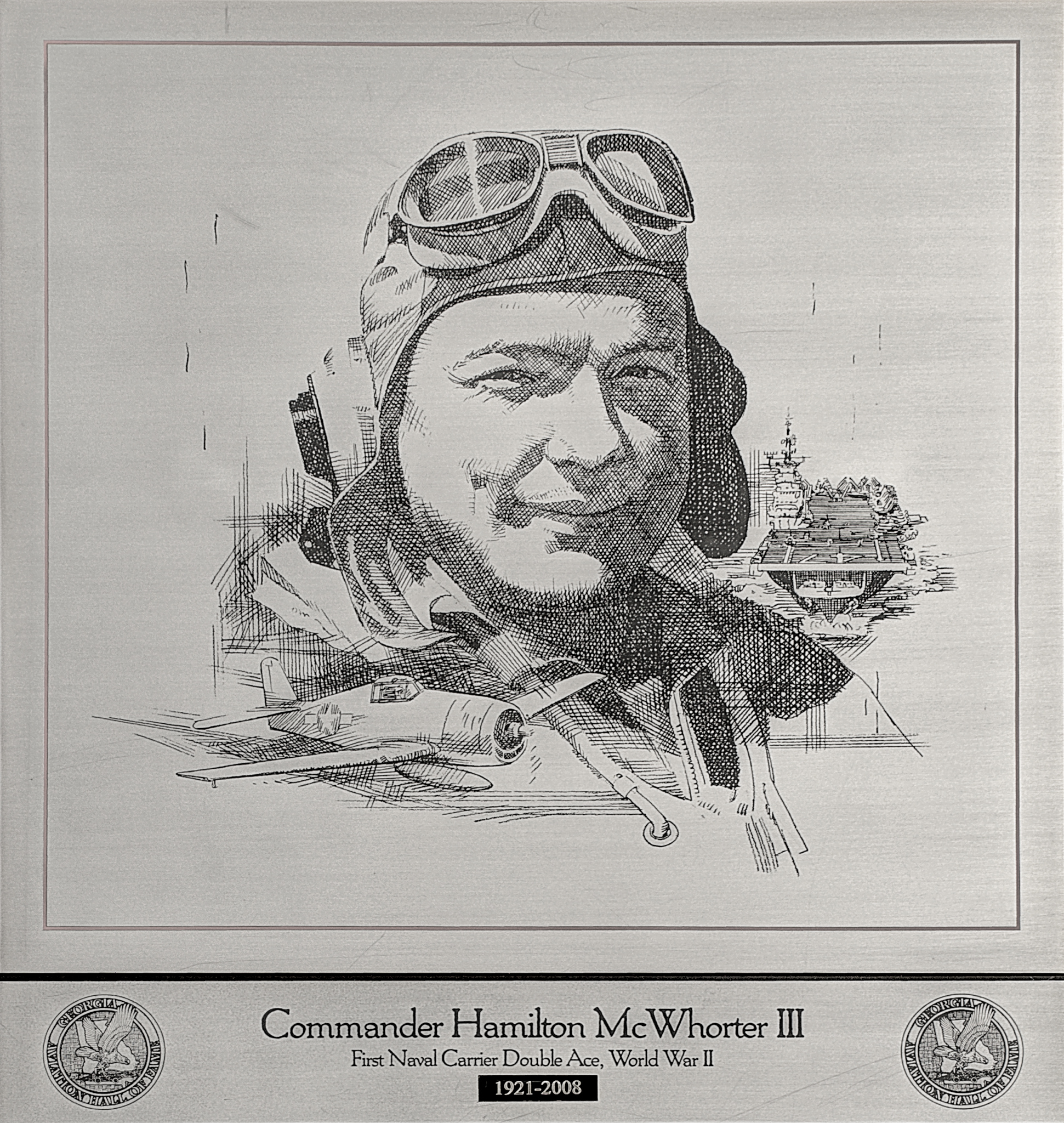
Plaque of McWhorter at the Georgia Aviation Hall of Fame

On a mission escorting SBD Dauntless dive bombers over Rabaul on November 11, 1943, McWhorter downed two Zeroes. McWhorter's Hellcat was hit several times in the attack, but he was able to land on the Essex. The Hellcat sustained bullet holes on both sides of the fuselage and several that went straight through each wing. During the February 17, 1944, Operation Hailstone airstrikes on Truk, McWhorter downed three Zeroes, bringing his score to ten victories. He thus became the first Hellcat double ace and the first carrier pilot double ace. In his memoirs, McWhorter described the engagement: "My wingman and I ran into three Zekes. The first had a perfect bead on me, but for some reason didn't fire and Bud knocked him down. The other two ran right into my sights, one after the other, inside ten seconds and went down. Less than a mile away another Zero (later identified as "Hamp") was bearing down on me. He could have got me, but strangely, he didn't fire either. I let him have a burst and set him afire."

The Essex arrived at San Francisco on March 10, and her pilots dispersed for a month-long leave. After meeting his parents-in-law at Naval Training Station Sampson and visiting his family in Athens, McWhorter was posted to the reforming VF-12 as one of its veteran cadre. VF-12 was attached to USS Randolph in 1945, and McWhorter claimed two more Japanese aircraft to raise his victory total to 12.

McWhorter was awarded the Distinguished Flying Cross five times in recognition of his actions. He was among the seven original inductees into the Georgia Aviation Hall of Fame when it was established in 1989.

After the war, McWhorter was given command of VF-12, an aviation unit of the United States Navy.

He ended his Navy career as executive officer of Naval Air Station Miramar in 1969 and retired to El Cajon. McWhorter's memoir, coauthored by Jay Stout, was published by Pacifica in 2001 as The First Hellcat Ace.

=== Affiliations ===
He was a member of the American Fighter Aces Association, the Distinguished Flying Cross Society, and the Tailhook Association.

== Awards ==

Naval Aviator Badge
Distinguished Flying Cross w/ four 5/16" Gold Stars	Air Medal w/ 5/16" Silver Star and 5/16" Gold Star	Combat Action Ribbon
Navy Presidential Unit Citation w/ one 3/16" bronze star	China Service Medal	American Defense Service Medal
American Campaign Medal	European-African-Middle Eastern Campaign Medal w/ one 3/16" bronze star	Asiatic-Pacific Campaign Medal w/ one 3/16" silver star and two 3/16" bronze stars
World War II Victory Medal	Navy Occupation Service Medal w/ 'Japan' clasp	National Defense Service Medal w/ one 3/16" bronze star

- Permanent Citation for the Gold Star awarded by Secretary of the Navy James Forrestal (1947)
- Georgia Aviation Hall of Fame (1989)
- Congressional Gold Medal awarded to American fighter aces, collectively May 23, 2014

== Personal ==
The Memoir of Hamilton McWhorter III: The First Hellcat Ace (2024)

In January 1943 he married Louise Edel. Together they had 5 children: Donald, Bill, Georgia, Hamilton, and Jon. He retired as a Navy commander in 1969 in El Cajon, California.

== See also ==
- List of World War II aces from the United States
- List of World War II flying aces

== Published work ==
- McWhorter, Hamilton; Stout, Jay A. (2024). The First Hellcat Ace. Havertown, Pennsylvania: Casemate. ISBN 9781636244099.

== Bibliography ==
- Cleaver, Thomas McKelvey (2017). Pacific Thunder: The US Navy's Central Pacific Campaign August 1943 – October 1944. Oxford UK: Osprey Publishing. p. 79. ISBN 9781472821843.
- Cleaver, Thomas McKelvey (2018). Tidal Wave: From Leyte Gulf to Tokyo Bay. Oxford UK: Osprey Publishing. p. 137. ISBN 9781472825476.
- Danilov, Victor (November 30, 1997). Hall of Fame Museums (1st ed.). Westport, Connecticut: Greenwood Press. p. 159. ISBN 978-0313300004.
- Hammel, Eric (2010) [1992]. Aces Against Japan. New York: Pocket Books. ISBN 9781890988081.
- Stout, Jay (2013). Unsung Eagles: True Stories of America's Citizen Airmen in the Skies. Havertown, Pennsylvania: Casemate Publishers. pp. 69–83. ISBN 9781612002095.
- Stout, Jay (2024). The First Hellcat Ace. Havertown, Pennsylvania: Casemate Publishers. pp. 100–104. ISBN 9781636244099.
- Tillman, Barrett (1979). Hellcat: The F6F in World War II (1st ed.). Annapolis, Maryland: Naval Institute Press. ISBN 978-1557509918.
- Young, Edward M. (March 18, 2014). F6F Hellcat Aces of VF-9 (Aircraft of the Aces (Book 119) ed.). Oxford, United Kingdom: Osprey Publishing. p. 43. ISBN 978-1782003359.
