= Eugene A. Valencia Jr. =

American military aviator (1921–1972)

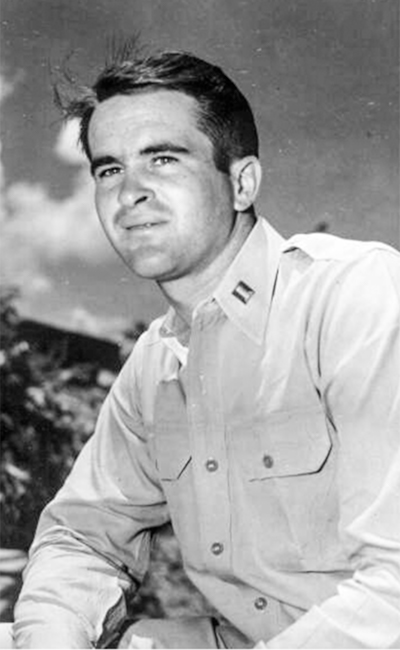
- Eugene Valencia
- Born: 13 April 1921; San Francisco, California, U.S.
- Died: 15 September 1972 (aged 51); San Antonio, Texas, U.S.
- Burial place: Glen Abbey Memorial; San Diego, California, U.S.
- Military career
- Allegiance: United States
- Branch: United States Navy
- Service years: 1941–1962
- Rank: Commander
- Units: USS Essex; VF-9
- Conflicts: World War II
- Awards: Navy Cross; Distinguished Flying Cross (6); Air Medal (6)

Eugene Anthony Valencia Jr. (13 April 1921 – 15 September 1972) was a 3rd highest scoring United States Navy fighter ace in World War II with 23 claims.

== Early life ==
A native of San Francisco, Valencia was born on 13 April 1921 and attended junior college before enlisting in the United States Navy for flight training in 1941.

== Naval career ==
Valencia received his wings in February 1942 and joined Fighting Squadron 9 a year later. During his first combat deployment to the Pacific, he flew Grumman F6F Hellcats from USS Essex in 1943–44. At the end of the first cruise in February 1944, Lieutenant (JG) Valencia was an ace with seven victories, including three in the large dogfight over Truk Atoll on 17 February.

Promoted to full lieutenant, Valencia prepared for VF-9's next deployment. He trained three other pilots in his "mowing machine" tactics, which became perhaps the deadliest naval fighter division (four planes) of the war. "Fighting 9" flew from USS Lexington and USS Yorktown during 1945, and Valencia's division accounted for 43 of the squadron's 130 victories. Valencia himself joined the ranks of the "aces in a day" with six kills over Japan on 17 April, and at war's end all his division's pilots were aces. James B. French had 11 victories, Harris Mitchell 10, and Clinton L. Smith 6. With 23 victories, Valencia remains the United States Navy's third-ranking ace of all time.

Valencia remained in the navy after World War II ended, and served in a variety of roles including ordnance test, transports, and antisubmarine warfare. As a full commander, he was executive officer of VFAW-3, an air defense squadron, from 1958–1960.

== Later life ==
Valencia retired from the navy in 1962 and entered business in Southern California. He died at an aces reunion in San Antonio in 1972, aged 51.

== Awards and decorations ==
Valencia's decorations include the Navy Cross, six Distinguished Flying Crosses, and six Air Medals.

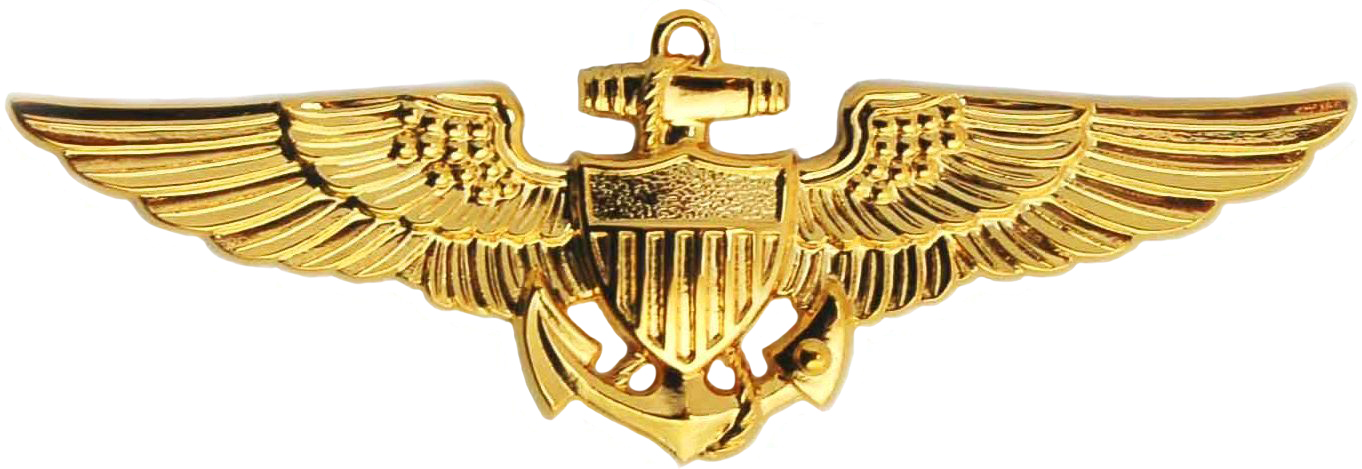

Naval Aviator Badge
Navy Cross
Distinguished Flying Cross w/ one 5/16" silver star	Air Medal w/ one 5/16" silver star	Combat Action Ribbon
Navy Presidential Unit Citation w/ three 3/16" bronze stars	Navy Unit Commendation w/ one 3/16" bronze star	American Defense Service Medal w/ one 3/16" bronze star
American Campaign Medal	Asiatic-Pacific Campaign Medal w/ one silver and two 3/16" bronze stars	World War II Victory Medal
National Defense Service Medal w/ one 3/16" bronze star	Navy Rifle Marksmanship Ribbon	Navy Pistol Marksmanship Ribbon

=== Navy Cross citation ===

Lieutenant Commander [then Lieutenant] Eugene Anthony Valencia
U.S. Navy
Date Of Action: April 17, 1945

The President of the United States of America takes pleasure in presenting the Navy Cross to Lieutenant Commander [then Lieutenant] Eugene Anthony Valencia, United States Naval Reserve, for extraordinary heroism in operations against the enemy while serving as Pilot of a carrier-based Navy Fighter Plane in Fighting Squadron NINE (VF-9), attached to the U.S.S. YORKTOWN (CV-10), on 17 April 1945, and deployed over Okinawa in the Ryukyu Islands. Leading his combat air patrol in an aggressive attack against an overwhelming force of enemy fighters intent on attacking our Fleet units, Lieutenant Commander Valencia engaged the enemy and, although outnumbered ten-to-one, personally shot down six hostile planes, probably destroyed another and damaged one. By his expert airmanship, gallant fighting spirit and devotion to duty, he contributed materially to the ultimate destruction and dispersal of the enemy formation and upheld the highest traditions of the United States Naval Service.

== Bibliography ==
- Olynyk, Frank. Stars & Bars: A Tribute to the American Fighter Ace 1920–1972. London: Grub Street, 1993
- Tillman, Barrett. Hellcat Aces of World War 2. London: Osprey Publishing, 1996. ISBN 1-85532-596-9
- Guy Charles Throner Jr. (21 March 2014). THE LIFE AND EXCITING TIMES OF GUY CHARLES THRONER JR. Xlibris Corporation. pp. 103–. ISBN 978-1-4931-2880-8.
- Barrett Tillman (11 October 2012). Hellcat: The F6F in World War II. Naval Institute Press. pp. 58–. ISBN 978-1-61251-189-4.
- Thomas McKelvey Cleaver (31 May 2018). Tidal Wave: From Leyte Gulf to Tokyo Bay. Bloomsbury Publishing. pp. 136–. ISBN 978-1-4728-2546-9.
