= VF-9 =

Fighting Squadron 9
- Active: 1 March 1942 – 28 September 1945
- Country: United States
- Branch: United States Navy
- Part of: Inactive
- Aircraft: F2A-3 Buffalo; F4F Wildcat; F6F-3/5 Hellcat
- Engagements: World War II

Fighting Squadron 9 or VF-9 was an aviation unit of the U.S. Navy. Originally established on 1 March 1942, it was disestablished on 28 September 1945.

== History ==
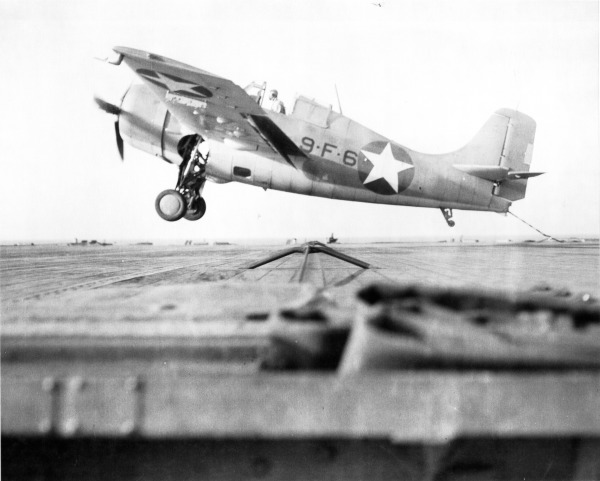
VF-9 F4F-4 lands on USS Ranger in October 1942

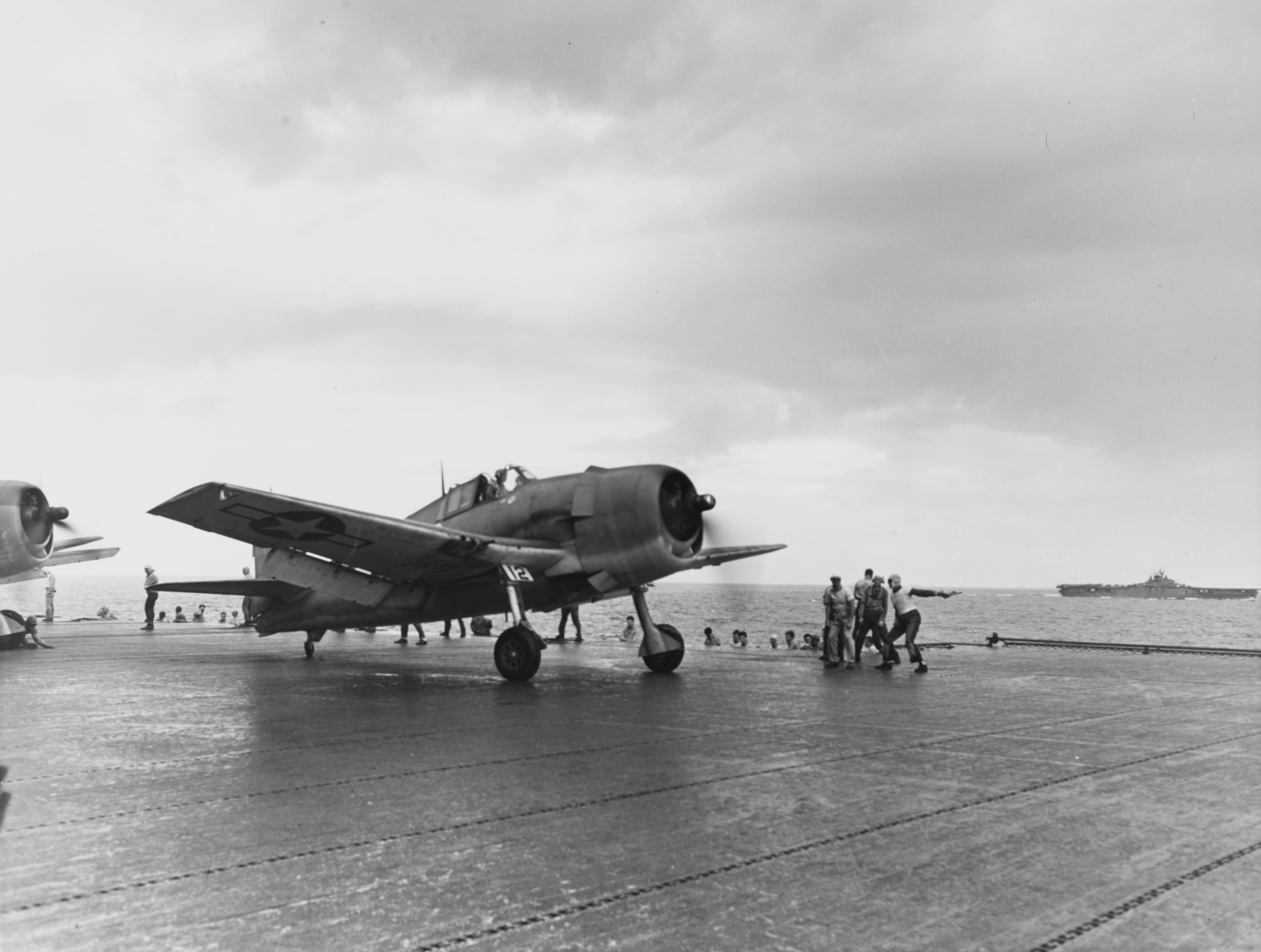
VF-9 F6F-3s prepare to launch from USS Essex in 1944

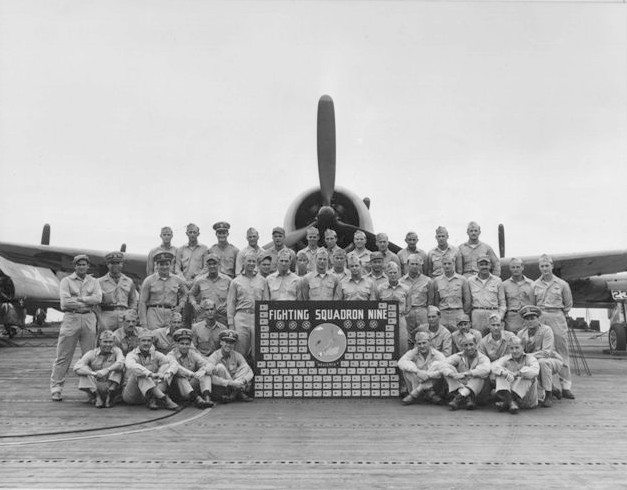
VF-9 squadron-members and scoreboard in 1944

VF-9 was established at NAS Norfolk on 1 March 1942 as part of the new Carrier Air Group 9 (CVG-9) which was to be deployed aboard the new carrier USS Essex. Originally equipped with the F2A-3 Buffalo, VF-9 began reequipping with the F4F-3 Wildcat in April 1942.

In late August 1942, VF-9 was deployed aboard USS Ranger to support Operation Torch. By late November 1942, Ranger had returned to NAS Norfolk and VF-9 rejoined the rest of CVG-9. VF-9 became the first Navy squadron to receive the F6F-3 Hellcat in February 1943.

In April 1943, CVG-9 embarked on the Essex for deployment to the Pacific Fleet. By mid-June, 1943 Essex had arrived at Naval Station Pearl Harbor and CVG-9 was based at Naval Air Station Barbers Point. In September, Essex left Pearl Harbor with CVG-9 embarked.

VF-9 scored over 250 kills in the Hellcat, making it the second most successful Hellcat squadron of the war.

== Home port assignments ==
- NAS Norfolk

== Aircraft assignment ==
- F2A-3 Buffalo
- F4F-3 Wildcat
- F6F-3/5 Hellcat

== Notable former members ==
- Herbert N. Houck
- Eugene A. Valencia, Jr.
- Thomas Mack Wilhoite
- Hamilton McWhorter III

== See also ==
- List of inactive United States Navy aircraft squadrons
- History of the United States Navy
