= 1847 Naval Air Squadron =

Inactive flying squadron of the Royal Navy's Fleet Air Arm

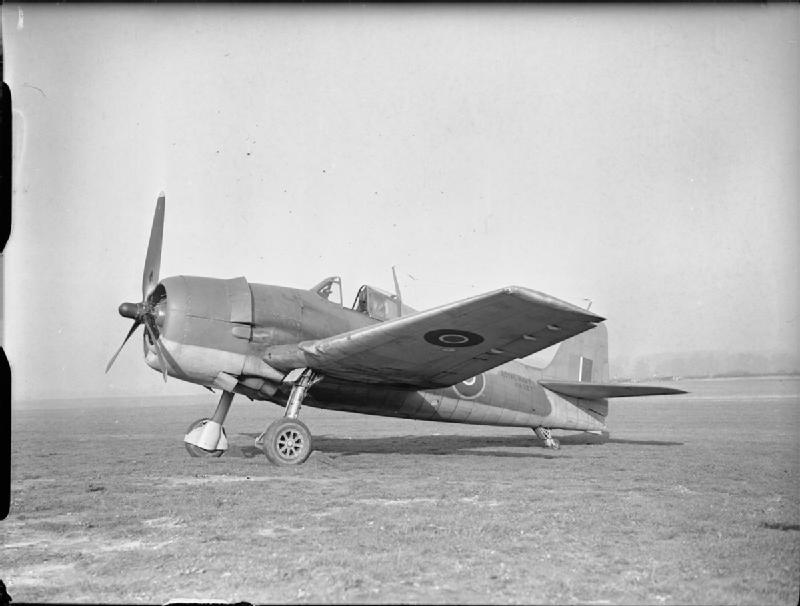
- Grumman Hellcat; an example of the type used by 1847 NAS
- Active: 1944
- Disbanded: 20 May 1944
- Country: United Kingdom
- Branch: Royal Navy
- Type: Single-seat fighter squadron
- Role: Fighter squadron
- Size: Ten aircraft
- Part of: Fleet Air Arm
- Home station: RNAS Eglinton

Insignia
- Identification Markings: Single letters

Aircraft flown
- Fighter: Grumman Hellcat

1847 Naval Air Squadron (1847 NAS) was a Fleet Air Arm (FAA) naval air squadron of the United Kingdom’s Royal Navy (RN). It formed, at the start of February 1944, at (HMS Gannet), RNAS Eglinton, Derry, Northern Ireland, as a fighter squadron with eight of its twelve pilots from the Royal Netherlands Navy, and was equipped with Grumman Hellcat fighter aircraft. After three months existence the squadron was absorbed into 1840 Naval Air Squadron, at HMS Gannet, during May 1944.

== History ==
=== Single-seat fighter squadron (1944) ===
1847 Naval Air Squadron formed on 1 February 1944 in Northern Ireland at Royal Naval Air Station Eglinton (HMS Gannet), which was located next to the city of Derry, as a Single Seat Fighter Squadron, under the command of Lieutenant Commander(A) H. Colville-Stewart, RNVR.

It consisted twelve pilots in total, four from Britain and augmented with eight pilots from the Royal Netherlands Navy. The squadron was intended for service in an escort carrier and was issued with ten Grumman Hellcat, an American carrier-based fighter aircraft. These were the F6F-3 variant, designated Hellcat F. Mk. I by the Fleet Air Arm.

While training and working up the squadron suffered a series of fatal accidents. On 27 March two Dutch pilots were killed in a mid-air collision. Another Dutch pilot died the following day and then on 22 April a British pilot died when he crashed into a hill top.

With the loss of one quarter of the aircrew and forty percent of its aircraft, a decision was made to disband the squadron and it was absorbed by 1840 Naval Air Squadron, at RNAS Eglinton (HMS Gannet), on 20 May.

== Aircraft flown ==
1847 Naval Air Squadron flew only one aircraft type:

- Grumman Hellcat F. Mk. I fighter aircraft (February - May 1944)

== Naval air stations ==
1847 Naval Air Squadron operated from a single naval air station of the Royal Navy in Northern Ireland:

- Royal Naval Air Station Eglinton (HMS Gannet), County Londonderry, (1 February - 20 May 1944)
- disbanded - (20 May 1944)

== Commanding officers ==
List of commanding officers of 1847 Naval Air Squadron with date of appointment:

- Lieutenant Commander(A) H. Colville-Stewart, RNVR, from 1 February 1944
- disbanded - 20 May 1944

Note: Abbreviation (A) signifies Air Branch of the RN or RNVR.
