= Thomas Jameson (cricketer, born 1908) =

English cricketer & Royal Navy officer (1908–1987)

Captain Thomas Jameson
Personal information
- Full name: Thomas George Cairnes Jameson
- Born: 6 April 1908; Bihar, Bengal Presidency, British India
- Died: 18 January 1987 (aged 78); Henley-on-Thames, Oxfordshire, England
- Batting: Right-handed
- Bowling: Leg break Right-arm medium

Domestic team information
- Years: Team
- 1930–1931: Hampshire

Career statistics
Competition	First-class
Matches	5
Runs scored	55
Batting average	9.16
100s/50s	–/–
Top score	23*
Balls bowled	42
Wickets	0
Bowling average	–
5 wickets in innings	–
10 wickets in match	–
Best bowling	–
Catches/stumpings	–/–
- Source: Cricinfo, 9 December 2009

Thomas George Cairnes Jameson (6 April 1908 — 18 January 1987) was an English first-class cricketer and Royal Navy officer.

The son of the Irishman Julian Veitch Jameson and his wife, Georgina Gertrude Munro Robertson, he was born in British India at Bihar in April 1908. He joined the Royal Navy in the 1920s as a sub-lieutenant and spent the early part of his career stationed aboard HMS Valhalla. Jameson made his debut in first-class cricket for the Royal Navy in 1929, making two appearances against the British Army cricket team and the Royal Air Force cricket team at Lord's. Whilst stationed at HMNB Portsmouth, he was selected to play first-class cricket for Hampshire in the County Championship in 1930 and 1931, making three appearances. He scored 55 runs in first-class cricket, with a highest score of 23 not out.

In the navy, Jameson was promoted to lieutenant in June 1931, with promotion to lieutenant commander in June 1939. Jameson served with the Royal Navy during the Second World War, during which he was promoted to commander in December 1943. After the war, he was promoted to captain in June 1949. Jameson retired from active service in July 1958; prior to his retirement, he had spent two years as commander officer of RNAS Eglinton. He was a member of the Union Club in London. Jameson died in hospital at Henley-on-Thames on 18 January 1987.
