= HMS Ravager =

Two ships of the British Royal Navy have been named HMS Ravager :

- HMS Ravager (D70) was a Ruler-class escort carrier launched in 1942 and transferred to the Royal Navy under Lend lease as HMS Ravager in 1943. She was returned to the USN in 1946 and then sold into merchant service. She was scrapped in 1973.
- HMS Ravager (1947) was a Landing Ship, Tank launched in 1945 as HMS LST 3505 and renamed HMS Ravager in 1947. She was sold in 1961.
