= Corona, Minnesota =

Unincorporated community in Minnesota, US

Corona
- Unincorporated community
- Location within Minnesota Location within the United States
- Coordinates: 46°40′14″N 92°45′59″W
- Country: United States
- State: Minnesota
- County: Carlton
- Elevation: 1,296 ft (395 m)
- Time zone: UTC-6 (Central (CST))
  - Summer (DST): UTC-5 (CDT)
- Area code: 218
- GNIS feature ID: 654728

Corona is an unincorporated community in Carlton County, in the U.S. state of Minnesota. Corona is located at 46°40′14″N 92°45′59″W.

== History ==
A post office was established at Corona in 1910, and remained in operation until it was discontinued in 1921. The name Corona, derived from Latin and meaning "crown", may be allusive of the lofty elevation of the place.
