= Distinguished Flying Cross Society =

The Distinguished Flying Cross is awarded to individuals who serve in any capacity with the United States Navy or Marine Corps. Recipients must engage in heroism during aerial flight.

Distinguished Flying Cross Society (DFCS) was founded in 1994 nonprofit war veterans’ organization, located in San Diego, California. The Flying Cross Society is established to honor recipients of the Distinguished Flying Cross. Its foundation is based on the principles of fraternity and fellowship among military aviators. The Society aims to preserve the historical narratives of these recipients and to educate the public about their contributions. There are 32 chapters and 7000 members of the DFCS.

== History ==
The Distinguished Flying Cross is America's highest award for aerial achievement and the fourth-highest award for extraordinary achievement or heroism. The award was authorized by United States Congress on July 2, 1926. According to the U.S. Air Force, the Distinguished Flying Cross was authorized by an Act of Congress on July 2, 1926, and was first awarded in 1927 to Capt. Charles A. Lindbergh for his solo flight across the Atlantic.

68 years after the inception of the DFC (1994) the Distinguished Flying Cross Society was started. Before the formation of DFCS there was no centralized documentation of the recipients of the DFC. The United States government kept no records on DFC recipients so there is no way to know how many received the medal. On 31 May 1994, the DFCS was recognized by the Californian Secretary of State, and on 6 June 1994, it was approved by the IRS as a 501(c)(19) organization.

The DFCS offers scholarships for descendants and adopted children of DFC Society members.

The society has 32 chapters all over the United States and those chapters schedule speaking engagements for Distinguished Flying Cross recipients.

On March 7, 2020, the Flying Cross Society dedicated a Memorial at Miramar National Cemetery in San Diego, California. The dedication took place on the birthday of 100 year old DFCS member and DFC recipient Air Force Brig. Gen. Robert L. Cardenas; he was on hand for the dedication. Seventy-five members of the DFCS attended the dedication.

In December 2024, the Society participated in a joint ceremony with Montgomery County authorities in Silver Spring, Maryland, at the Brigadier General Charles E. McGee Library. This event marked the unveiling of a commemorative monument in honor of Tuskegee Airman Brigadier General Charles E. McGee.

The Distinguished Flying Cross Society has achieved its 501(c)(3) status in September 2025.

== Embezzling ==
In 2017 the Treasurer of the society pled guilty in Federal court to embezzling $124,000 from the Society. The Treasure named Anthony Ventura, was a Vietnam aviator and was also a recipient of the Distinguished Flying Cross. He falsified reports to cover his theft, and he filed false tax returns.

== See also ==
- Inter-service awards and decorations of the United States military
