= Grumman F6F Hellcat =

United States Navy fighter airplane

F6F Hellcat
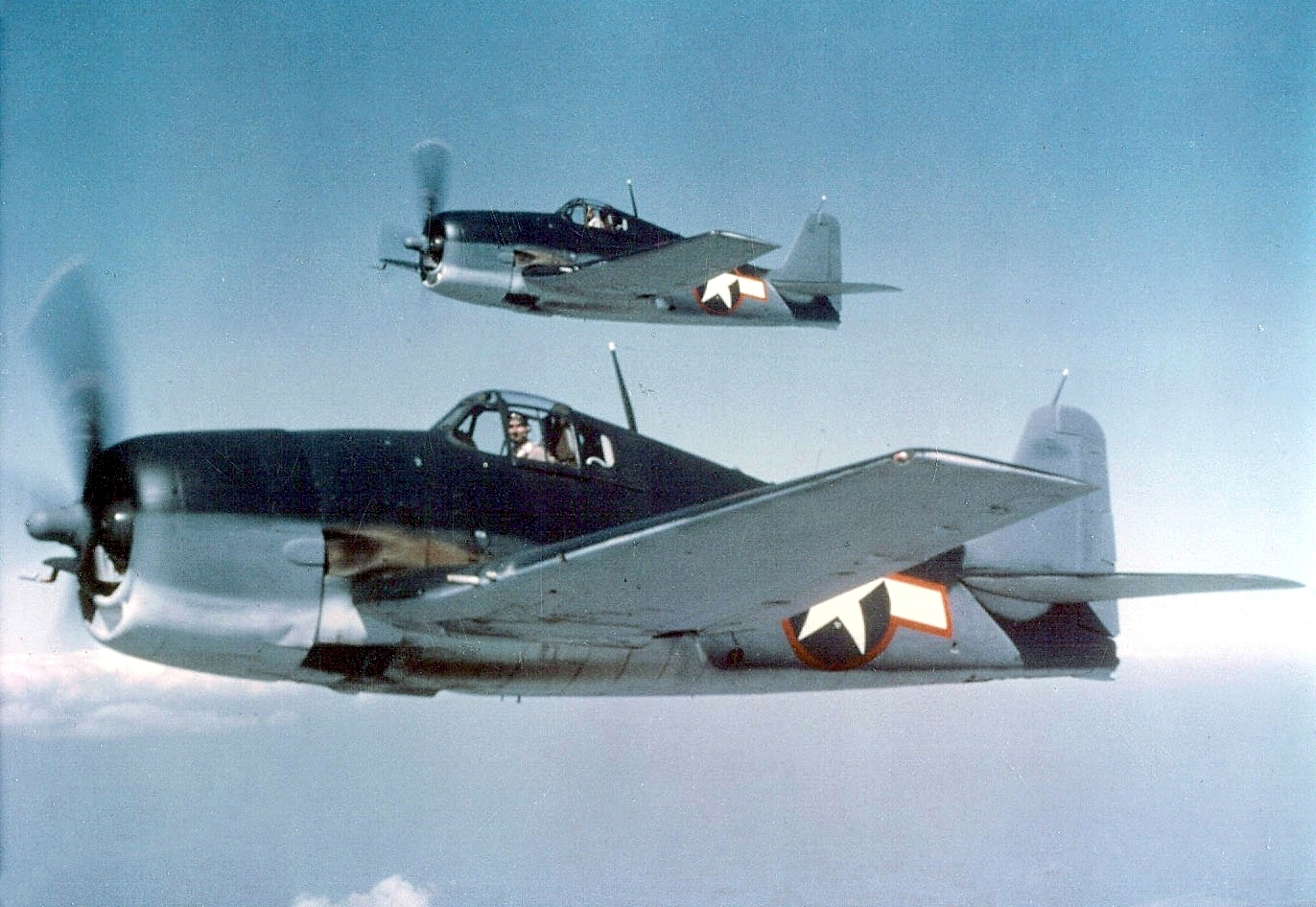
- Grumman F6F-3 Hellcats in tricolor camouflage (Note: The insignia red outline around the national markings indicate that this picture was taken circa June–September 1943.)

General information
- Type: Carrier-based fighter aircraft
- National origin: United States
- Manufacturer: Grumman
- Primary users: United States Navy: United States Marine Corps; Royal Navy; French Navy
- Number built: 12,275

History
- Manufactured: 1942–1945
- Introduction date: 1943
- First flight: 26 June 1942
- Retired: 1961 Uruguayan Navy

The Grumman F6F Hellcat is an American carrier-based fighter aircraft of World War II. Designed to replace the earlier F4F Wildcat and to counter the Japanese Mitsubishi A6M Zero, it was the United States Navy's dominant fighter in the second half of the Pacific War. In gaining that role, it prevailed over its faster competitor, the Vought F4U Corsair, which initially suffered from several carrier-operating issues, including poor forward visibility, landing bounce and stall characteristics.

Powered by a 2,000 hp (1,500 kW) Pratt & Whitney R-2800 Double Wasp, the same powerplant used for both the Corsair and the USAAF Republic P-47 Thunderbolt fighters, the F6F was an entirely new aircraft that retained only a general resemblance to the earlier Wildcat. Some military observers tagged the Hellcat as the "Wildcat's big brother".

The F6F made its combat debut on 31 August 1943 during raids on Marcus Island. It subsequently established itself as a rugged, well-designed carrier fighter, which was able to outperform the A6M Zero and played a major role in helping the U.S. gain air superiority in the Pacific. In total, 12,275 were built in just over two years.

Hellcats were credited with destroying a total of 5,223 enemy aircraft while in service with the U.S. Navy, U.S. Marine Corps, and Royal Navy Fleet Air Arm (FAA). (Note: This can be broken down as 5,163 in the Pacific and eight more during the invasion of Southern France, plus 52 with the FAA during World War II.) This was more than any other Allied naval aircraft. After the war, Hellcats were phased out of front-line service in the US, but radar-equipped F6F-5Ns remained in service as late as 1954 as night fighters.

== Design and development ==
=== XF6F ===
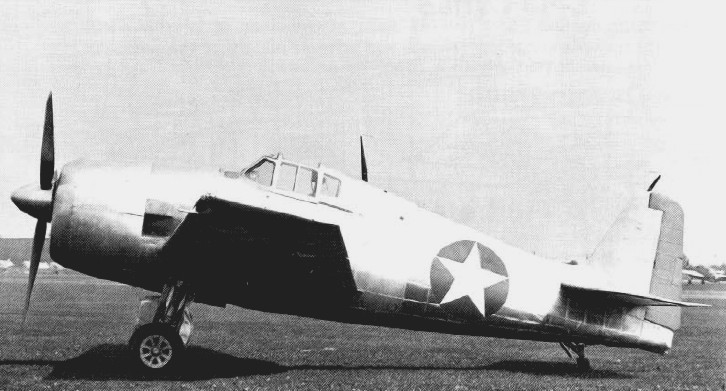
Unpainted XF6F-1 prior to its first flight (1942)

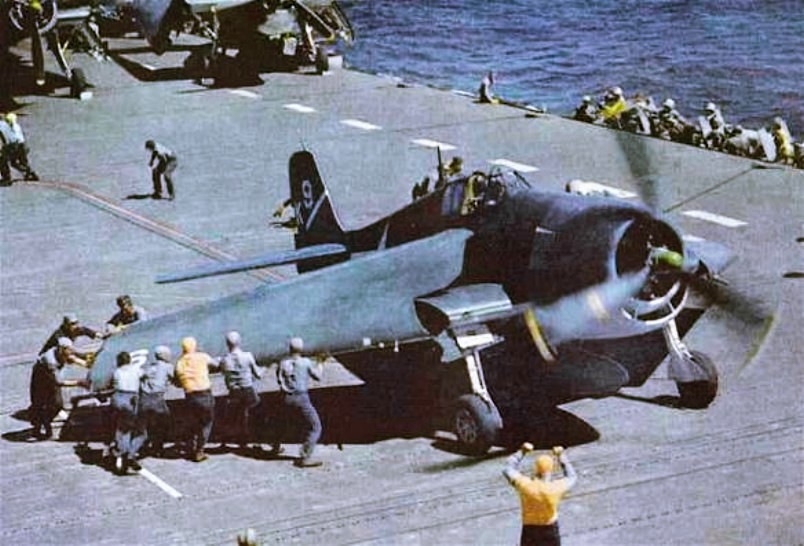
F6F-3 aboard USS Yorktown has its "Sto-Wing" folding wings deployed for takeoff (circa 1943-44).

Grumman had been working on a successor to the F4F Wildcat since 1938, and the contract for the prototype XF6F-1 was signed on 30 June 1941. The aircraft was originally designed to use the Wright R-2600 Twin Cyclone two-row, 14-cylinder radial engine of 1,700 hp (1,300 kW) (the same engine used with Grumman's then-new torpedo bomber under development), driving a three-bladed Curtiss Electric propeller. Instead of the Wildcat's narrow-track, hand-cranked, main landing gear retracting into the fuselage inherited from the F3F (a design from the 1930s Grumman FF-1 fighter biplane), the Hellcat had wide-set, hydraulically actuated landing-gear struts that rotated through 90° while retracting backwards into the wings, with full wheel doors fitted to the struts that covered the entire strut and the upper half of the main wheel when retracted, and twisted with the main gear struts through 90° during retraction. The wing was mounted lower on the fuselage and was able to be hydraulically or manually folded, with each panel outboard of the undercarriage bay folding backwards from pivoting on a specially oriented, Grumman-patented "Sto-Wing" diagonal axis pivoting system much like the earlier F4F, with a folded stowage position parallel to the fuselage with the leading edges pointing diagonally down.

Throughout early 1942, Leroy Grumman, along with his chief designers Jake Swirbul and Bill Schwendler, worked closely with the U.S. Navy's Bureau of Aeronautics (BuAer) and experienced F4F pilots, to develop the new fighter in such a way that it could counter the Zero's strengths and help gain air dominance in the Pacific Theater of Operations. On 22 April 1942, Lieutenant Commander Butch O'Hare toured the Grumman Aircraft company and spoke with Grumman engineers, analyzing the performance of the F4F Wildcat against the Mitsubishi A6M Zero in aerial combat. (Note: On the previous day, while receiving the Medal of Honor from President Franklin D. Roosevelt, O'Hare was asked by the President what was needed in a new naval fighter; O'Hare's response was "something that would go upstairs faster.") BuAer's Lt Cdr A. M. Jackson (Note: Jackson emphasized to Grumman, "you can't hit 'em if you can't see 'em") directed Grumman's designers to mount the cockpit higher in the fuselage. In addition, the forward fuselage sloped down slightly to the engine cowling, giving the Hellcat's pilot good visibility.

==== Change of powerplant ====
Based on combat accounts of encounters between the F4F Wildcat and A6M Zero, on 26 April 1942, BuAer directed Grumman to install the more-powerful, 18-cylinder Pratt & Whitney R-2800 Double Wasp radial engine – which was already in use with Chance Vought's Corsair since 1940 – in the second XF6F-1 prototype. Grumman complied by redesigning and strengthening the F6F airframe to incorporate the 2,000 hp (1,500 kW) R-2800-10, driving a three-bladed Hamilton Standard propeller. With this combination, Grumman estimated the XF6F-3s performance would increase by 25% over that of the XF6F-1. The Cyclone-powered XF6F-1 (02981) first flew on 26 June 1942, followed by the first Double Wasp-equipped aircraft, the XF6F-3 (02982), which first flew on 30 July 1942. The first production F6F-3, powered by an R-2800-10, flew on 3 October 1942, with the type reaching operational readiness with VF-9 on USS Essex in February 1943. (Note: Late-production F6F-3s were powered by the same water-injected R-2800 used by the F6F-5.)

=== Further development ===
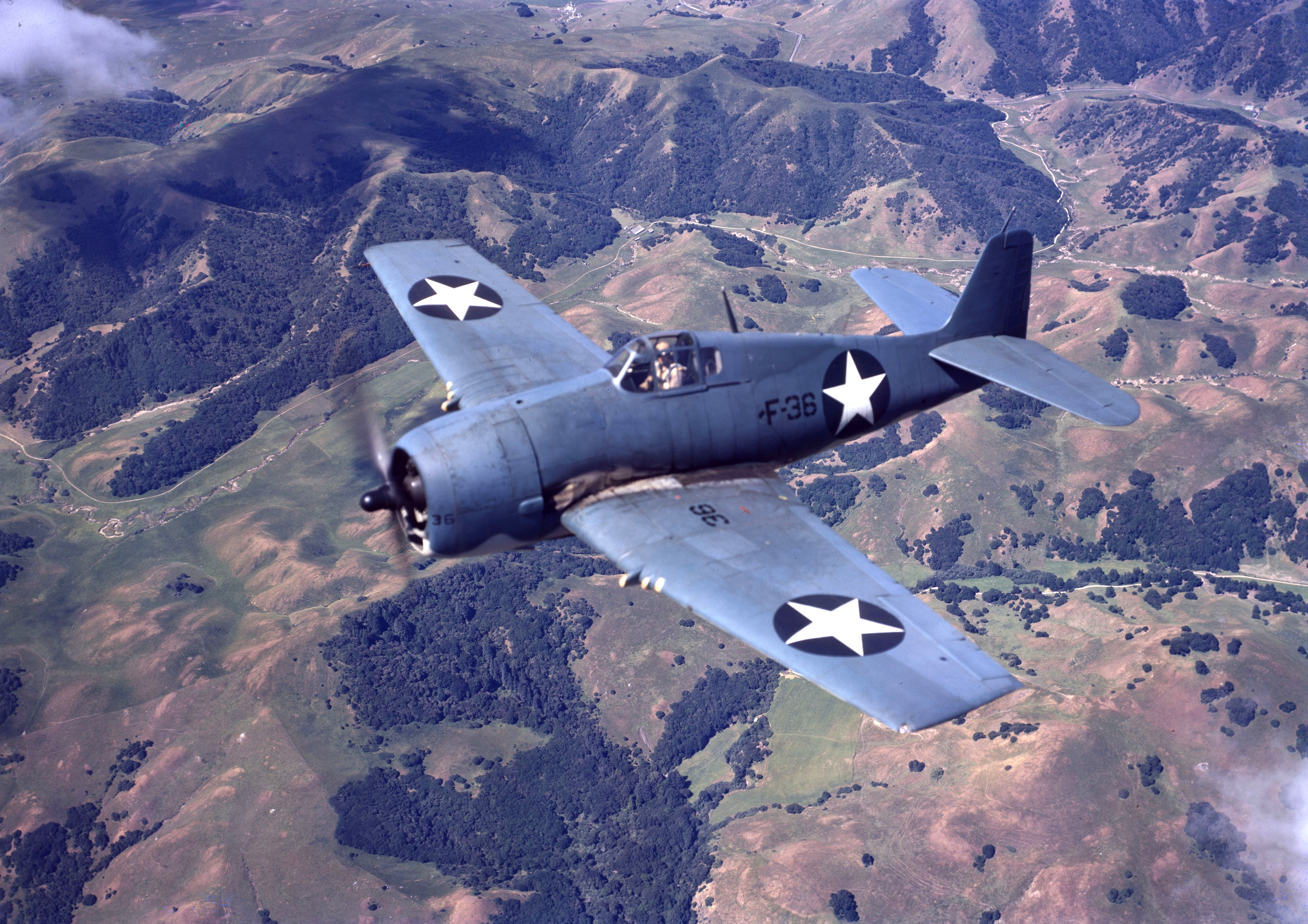
An early F6F-3 in blue-gray over light gull-gray (1943)

The F6F series was designed to take damage and get the pilot safely back to base. A bullet-resistant windshield was used and a total of 212 lb (96 kg) of cockpit armor was fitted, along with armor around the oil tank and oil cooler. A 250 US gal (950 L; 210 imp gal) self-sealing fuel tank was fitted in the fuselage. Standard armament on the F6F-3 consisted of six .50 BMG (12.7 mm) AN/M2 Browning air-cooled machine guns with 400 rounds per gun. A center-section hardpoint under the fuselage could carry a single 150 US gal (570 L; 120 imp gal) disposable drop tank, while later aircraft had single bomb racks installed under each wing, inboard of the undercarriage bays; with these and the center-section hard point, late-model F6F-3s could carry a total bomb load in excess of 2,000 lb (900 kg). Six 5 in (127 mm) High Velocity Aircraft Rockets (HVARs) could be carried – three under each wing on "zero-length" launchers.

Two night-fighter subvariants of the F6F-3 were developed; the 18 F6F-3Es were converted from standard-3s and featured the AN/APS-4 10 GHz frequency radar in a pod mounted on a rack beneath the right wing, with a small radar scope fitted in the middle of the main instrument panel and radar operating controls installed on the port side of the cockpit. The later F6F-3N, first flown in July 1943, was fitted with the AN/APS-6 radar in the fuselage, with the antenna dish in a bulbous fairing mounted on the leading edge of the outer right wing as a development of the AN/APS-4; about 200 F6F-3Ns were built. Hellcat night fighters claimed their first victories in November 1943. In total, 4,402 F6F-3s were built through until April 1944, when production was changed to the F6F-5.

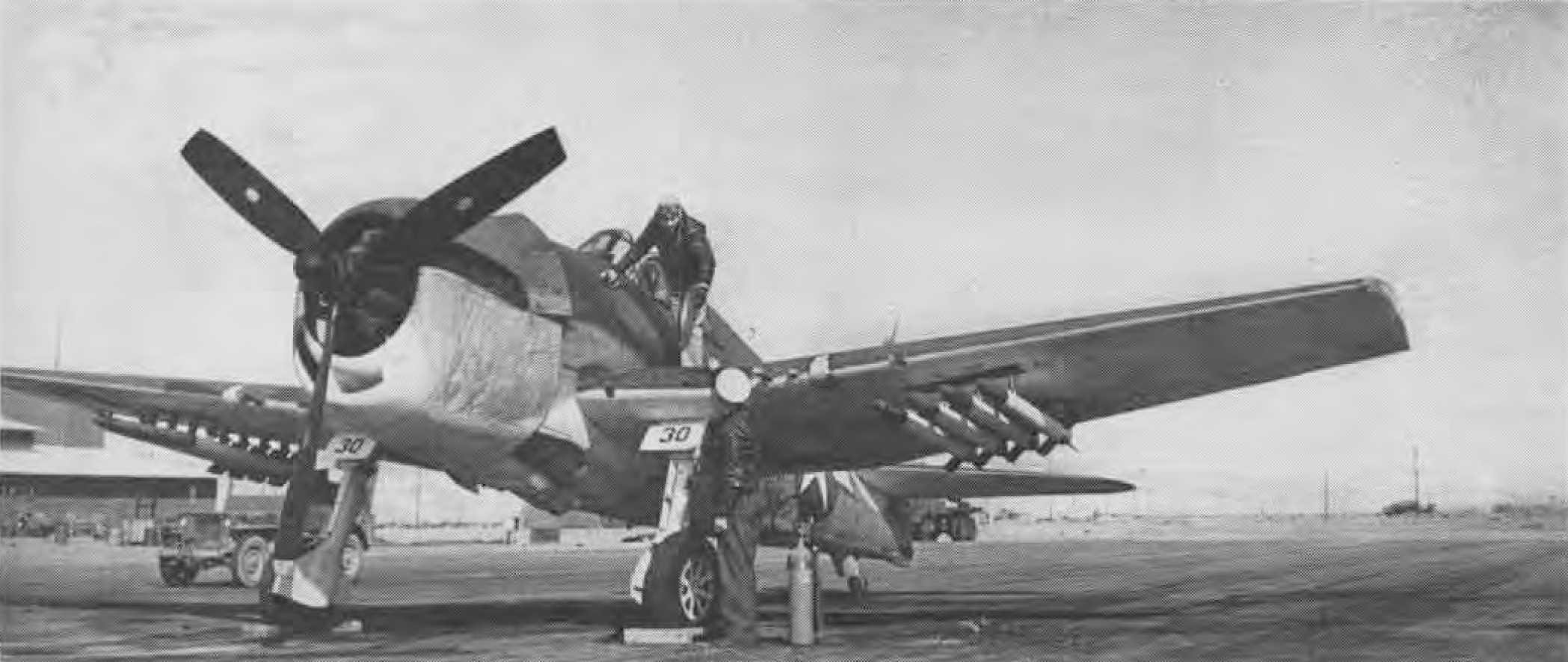
An early-production F6F-5 being tested with eight 5-inch HVAR rockets (circa 1944–45)

The F6F-5 featured several improvements, including a more powerful R-2800-10W engine employing a water-injection system and a slightly more streamlined engine cowling, spring-loaded control tabs on the ailerons, and an improved, clear-view windscreen, with a flat armored-glass front panel replacing the F6F-3's curved plexiglass panel and internal armor glass screen. In addition, the rear fuselage and tail units were strengthened, and apart from some early production aircraft, most of the F6F-5s built were painted in an overall gloss sea-blue finish. After the first few F6F-5s were built, the small windows behind the main canopy were deleted. The F6F-5N night-fighter variant was fitted with an AN/APS-6 radar in a fairing on the outer-starboard wing. A few standard F6F-5s were also fitted with camera equipment for reconnaissance duties as the F6F-5P. While all F6F-5s were capable of carrying an armament mix of one 20-mm (.79-in) M2 cannon in each of the inboard gun bays (220 rounds per gun), along with two pairs of .50-in (12.7-mm) machine guns (each with 400 rounds per gun), this configuration was only used on later F6F-5N night fighters. The F6F-5 was the most common F6F variant, with 7,870 being built. (Note: US produced 20 mm cannon were troubled by reliability issues delaying their introduction)

Other prototypes in the F6F series included the XF6F-4 (02981, a conversion of the XF6F-1 powered by an R-2800-27 armed with four 20-mm M2 cannon), which first flew on 3 October 1942 as the prototype for the projected F6F-4. This version never entered production and 02981 was converted to an F6F-3 production aircraft. Another experimental prototype was the XF6F-2 (66244), an F6F-3 converted to use a Wright R-2600-15, fitted with a Birman-manufactured mixed-flow turbocharger, which was later replaced by a Pratt & Whitney R-2800-21, also fitted with a Birman turbocharger. The turbochargers proved to be unreliable on both engines, while performance improvements were marginal. As with the XF6F-4, 66244 was soon converted back to a standard F6F-3. Two XF6F-6s (70188 and 70913) were converted from F6F-5s and used the 18-cylinder 2,100 hp (1,566 kW) Pratt and Whitney R-2800-18W two-stage supercharged radial engine with water injection driving a Hamilton-Standard four-bladed propeller. The XF6F-6s were the fastest version of the Hellcat series with a top speed of 417 mph (671 km/h), but the war ended before this variant could be mass-produced. The last Hellcat rolled out in November 1945, the total production being 12,275, of which 11,000 had been built in just two years. This high production rate was credited to the sound original design, which required little modification once production was under way.

== Operational history ==
=== U.S. Navy and Marines ===
The U.S. Navy greatly preferred the more docile flight characteristics of the F6F over the Vought F4U Corsair, despite the Corsair's superior speed. This preference was particularly evident during carrier landings, which were a critical requirement for the Navy's success. Consequently, the Navy transferred the Corsair to the Marine Corps, which, not having to worry about carrier landings, utilized the Corsair for land-based sorties. The Hellcat remained the standard carrier-borne fighter for the U.S. Navy until the F4U series was finally cleared for U.S. carrier operations in late 1944. By that time, the carrier landing issues had largely been resolved, thanks in part to the Royal Navy Fleet Air Arm's use of the Corsair, which began in 1943. In addition to its good flight qualities, the Hellcat was easy to maintain and had an airframe tough enough to withstand the rigors of routine carrier operations. Like the Wildcat, the Hellcat was designed for ease of manufacturing and ability to withstand significant damage.

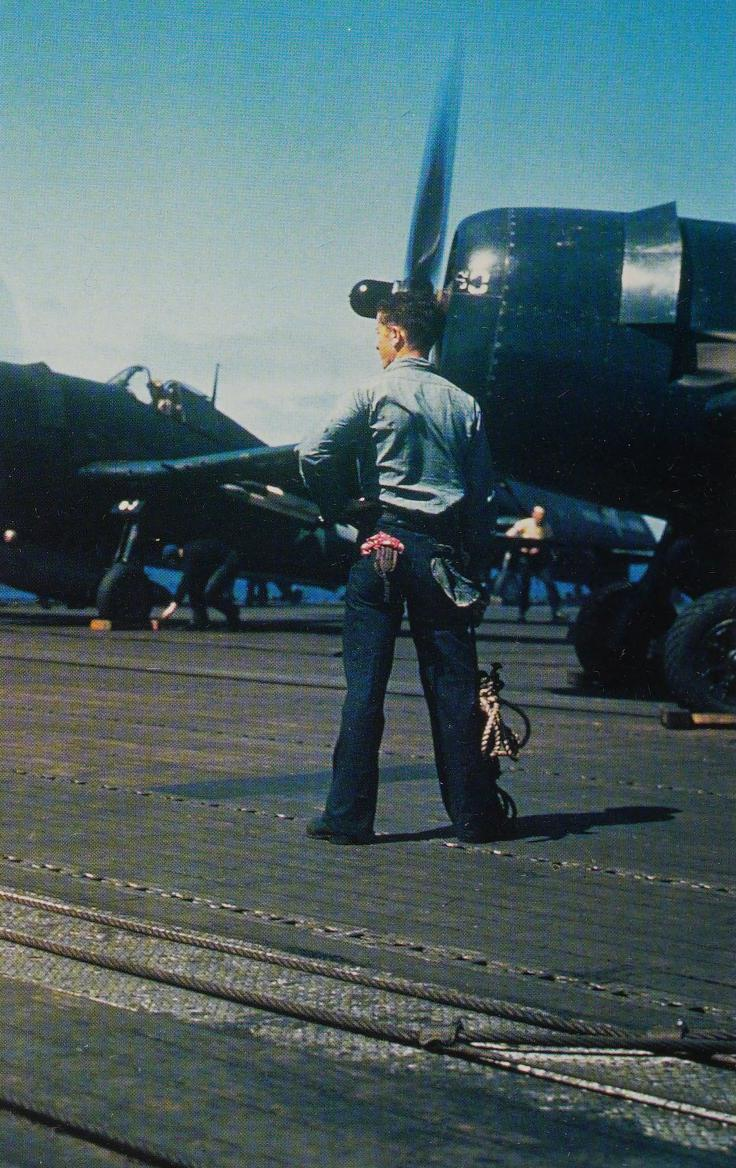
VF-82 Grumman F6F-5 ready for launch from USS Bennington off Okinawa in May 1945: Most of the F6F-5s built were painted overall glossy sea blue.

The Hellcat first saw action against the Japanese on 1 September 1943, when fighters off USS Independence shot down a Kawanishi H8K "Emily" flying boat. Soon after, on 23 and 24 November, Hellcats engaged Japanese aircraft over Tarawa, shooting down a claimed 30 Mitsubishi Zeros for the loss of one F6F. Over Rabaul, New Britain, on 11 November 1943, Hellcats and F4U Corsairs were engaged in day-long fights with many Japanese aircraft, including A6M Zeros, claiming nearly 50 aircraft.

When trials were flown against a captured Mitsubishi A6M5 model Zero, they showed that the Hellcat was faster at all altitudes. The F6F out-climbed the Zero marginally above 14,000 ft (4,300 m) and rolled faster at speeds above 235 mph (378 km/h), however, the Japanese fighter could out-turn its American opponent with ease at low speed, and enjoyed a slightly better rate of climb below 14,000 ft (4,300 m). The trials report concluded:

Do not dogfight with a Zero 52. Do not try to follow a loop or half-roll with a pull-through. When attacking, use your superior power and high-speed performance to engage at the most favorable moment. To evade a Zero 52 on your tail, roll and dive away into a high-speed turn.

Hellcats were the major U.S. Navy fighter type involved in the Battle of the Philippine Sea, where so many Japanese aircraft were shot down that Navy aircrews nicknamed the battle the "Great Marianas Turkey Shoot". The F6F accounted for 75% of all aerial victories recorded by the U.S. Navy in the Pacific. Radar-equipped Hellcat night-fighter squadrons appeared in early 1944.

A formidable opponent for the Hellcat was the Kawanishi N1K, but it was produced too late and in insufficient numbers to affect the outcome of the war.

==== Sortie, kill, and loss figures ====
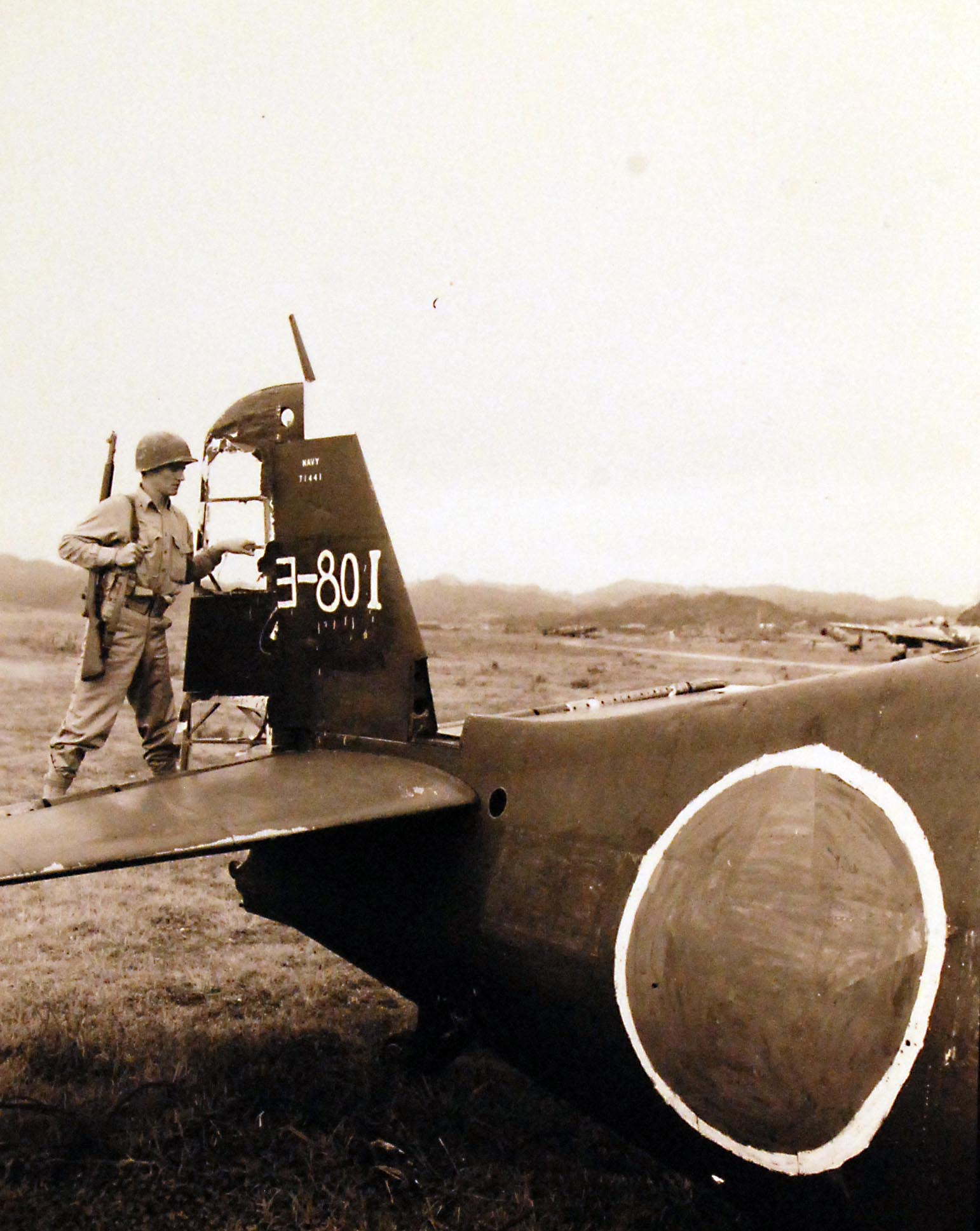
A U.S Marine inspects a Japanese-captured F6F-5 in Yokosuka in September 1945.

U.S. Navy and Marine F6F pilots flew 66,530 combat sorties and claimed 5,163 kills (56% of all U.S. Navy/Marine air victories of the war) at a recorded cost of 270 Hellcats in aerial combat (an overall kill-to-loss ratio of 19:1). The aircraft performed well against the various Japanese opponents with a claimed 13:1 kill ratio against the A6M Zero, 9.5:1 against the Nakajima Ki-84, and 3.7:1 against the Mitsubishi J2M during the last year of the war. The F6F became the prime ace-maker aircraft in the American inventory, with 305 Hellcat aces. The U.S. successes were not just attributed to superior aircraft; from 1942 onwards, they faced increasingly inexperienced Japanese aviators and had the advantage of increasing numerical superiority. In the ground-attack role, Hellcats dropped 6,503 tons (5,899 metric tonnes) of bombs.

The U.S. Navy's all-time leading ace, Captain David McCampbell, scored all of his 34 victories in the Hellcat. He once described the F6F as "... an outstanding fighter plane. It performed well, was easy to fly, and was a stable gun platform, but what I really remember most was that it was rugged and easy to maintain."

During the course of World War II, 2,462 F6F Hellcats were lost to all causes – 270 in aerial combat, 553 to antiaircraft ground and shipboard fire, and 341 due to operational causes. Of the total figure, 1,298 were destroyed in training and ferry operations, normally outside of the combat zones.

Hamilton McWhorter III, a Navy aviator and a flying ace of World War II, was credited with shooting down 12 Japanese aircraft. He was the first U.S. Navy aviator to become an ace while flying the Grumman F6F Hellcat and the first Navy carrier pilot to achieve double ace status.

Arthur Van Haren, Jr., a Navy combat Hellcat ace of WWII from Arizona, was credited with shooting down 9 Japanese planes. He was awarded two Distinguished Flying Crosses, and was inducted into the Arizona Aviation Hall of Fame in 2012.

=== British use ===
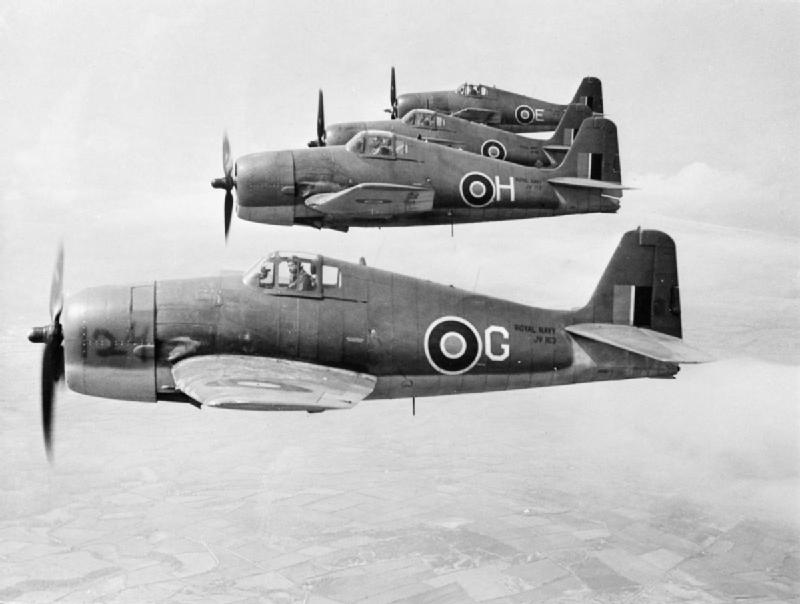
A section of Fleet Air Arm Hellcat F Mk.Is of 1840 Squadron in June 1944

The British Fleet Air Arm (FAA) received 1,263 F6Fs under the Lend-Lease Act; initially, it was known as the Grumman Gannet Mark I. The name Hellcat replaced it in early 1943 for the sake of simplicity, the Royal Navy at that time adopting the use of the existing American naval names for all the U.S.-made aircraft supplied to it, with the F6F-3 being designated Hellcat F Mk. I, the F6F-5, the Hellcat F Mk. II and the F6F-5N, the Hellcat NF Mk. II. (Note: Meaning Fighter Mark I, Fighter Mark II and Night Fighter Mark II respectively) They saw action off Norway, in the Mediterranean, and in the Far East. Several were fitted with photographic reconnaissance equipment similar to the F6F-5P, receiving the designation Hellcat FR Mk. II. In the European and Mediterranean theaters, these FAA Hellcats primarily faced land-based aircraft , so experienced far fewer opportunities for air-to-air combat than their USN/Marines counterparts; nevertheless, they claimed a total of 52 enemy aircraft kills during 18 aerial combats from May 1944 to July 1945. 1844 Naval Air Squadron, on board HMS Indomitable of the British Pacific Fleet was the highest-scoring unit, with 32.5 kills.

FAA Hellcats, as with other Lend-Lease aircraft, were rapidly replaced by British aircraft after the end of the war, with only two of the 12 squadrons equipped with the Hellcat at VJ-Day still retaining Hellcats by the end of 1945. These two squadrons were disbanded in 1946. When the war ended, 889 Squadron FAA, equipped with 6 Hellcat Is and II (PR) photo-reconnaissance variants, was preparing to depart from Scotland for the Far East (the squadron had been based at RAF Woodvale since its re-formation after VE Day, and practising carrier operations on HMS Trouncer before moving to HMS Ravager), to replace 888 Squadron FAA, and intended to photograph Japanese beaches in anticipation of the planned invasion that was forestalled by the Atomic bombings of Hiroshima and Nagasaki. With the cessation of hostilities, the squadron (which included pilot William Stevenson) was disbanded and the Hellcats dumped off the Scottish coast. (That was the fate of much lend-lease equipment that survived the war, including aircraft; under the terms of lend-lease agreements, any aircraft that were not returned to the United States or paid for had to be destroyed.)

=== Postwar use ===
Postwar service: A bright orange F6F-3K target drone

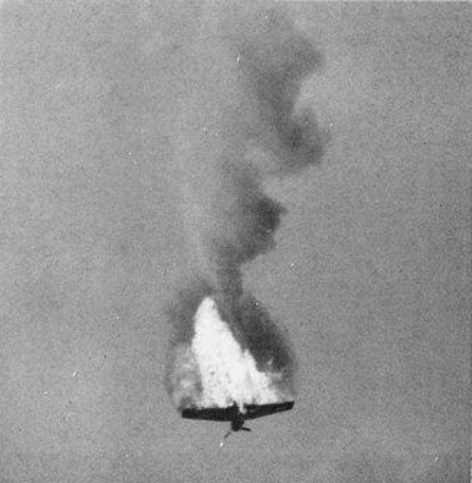
A F6F-5K Hellcat target drone is shot down by the heavy cruiser USS Saint Paul, in 1954.

After the war, the Hellcat was succeeded by the F8F Bearcat, which was smaller, more powerful (powered by uprated Double Wasp radials) and more maneuverable, but entered service too late to see combat in World War II.

The Hellcat was used for second-line USN duties, including training and Naval Reserve squadrons, and a handful were converted to target drones. In late 1952, Guided Missile Unit 90 used F6F-5K drones, each carrying a 2,000 lb (910 kg) bomb, to attack bridges in Korea. Flying from USS Boxer, the Hellcat drones were radio controlled from an escorting AD Skyraider.

The F6F-5 was the first aircraft used by the U.S. Navy's Blue Angels official flight demonstration team at its formation in 1946.

French Naval Aviation was equipped with F6F-5 Hellcats and used them in combat during the First Indochina War, launched from the Arromanches and La Fayette. These were painted in Gloss Sea Blue, similar to post-World War II US Navy aircraft until about 1955, but had a modified French roundel with an image of an anchor. The plane equipped four squadrons (including the Normandie-Niemen squadron of WWII fame) before these units transitioned to the F8F Bearcat.

The Uruguayan Navy also used F6F-5s until the early 1960s.

== Variants ==
=== XF6F prototypes ===
XF6F-1
First prototype, powered by a two-stage mechanically supercharged 1,600 hp (1,193 kW) Wright R-2600-10 Cyclone 14 radial piston engine.
XF6F-2
The first XF6F-1 prototype revised and fitted with a turbocharged Wright R-2600-16 Cyclone radial piston engine. R-2600 replaced by turbocharged R-2800-21.

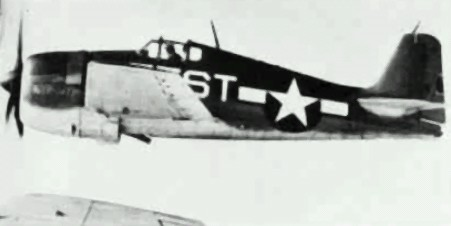
XF6F-2 showing the later R-2800-21 installation with Birman turbocharger (1943)

XF6F-3
Second prototype fitted with a two-stage supercharged 2,000 hp (1,491 kW) Pratt & Whitney R-2800-10 Double Wasp radial piston engine.
XF6F-4
One F6F-3 fitted with a two-stage, two-speed supercharged 2,100 hp (1,566 kW) Pratt & Whitney R-2800-27 Double Wasp radial piston engine.
XF6F-6
Two F6F-5s that were fitted with the 2,100 hp (1,566 kW) Pratt & Whitney R-2800-18W radial piston engine, and four-bladed propellers.

=== Series production ===
F6F-3 (British designation Gannet F. Mk. I, and then later, renamed Hellcat F. Mk. I, January 1944)
Single-seat fighter, fighter-bomber aircraft, powered by a 2,000 hp (1,491 kW) Pratt & Whitney R-2800-10 Double Wasp radial piston engine.
F6F-3E
Night fighter version, equipped with an AN/APS-4 radar in a fairing on the starboard outer wing.
F6F-3K
A radio-controlled target drone.
F6F-3N
Another night fighter version, equipped with a newer AN/APS-6 radar in a fairing on the starboard outer wing.
F6F-5 Hellcat (British Hellcat F. Mk. II)
Improved version, with a redesigned engine cowling, a new windscreen structure with an integral bulletproof windscreen, revised ailerons, and strengthened tail surfaces; powered by a 2,200 hp (1,641 kW) Pratt & Whitney R-2800-10W (-W denotes Water Injection) radial piston engine. First approximately 1500 F6F-5 retained the small windows aft of the sliding canopy of the F6F-3.
F6F-5K Hellcat
A number of F6F-5s and F6F-5Ns were converted into radio-controlled target drones.

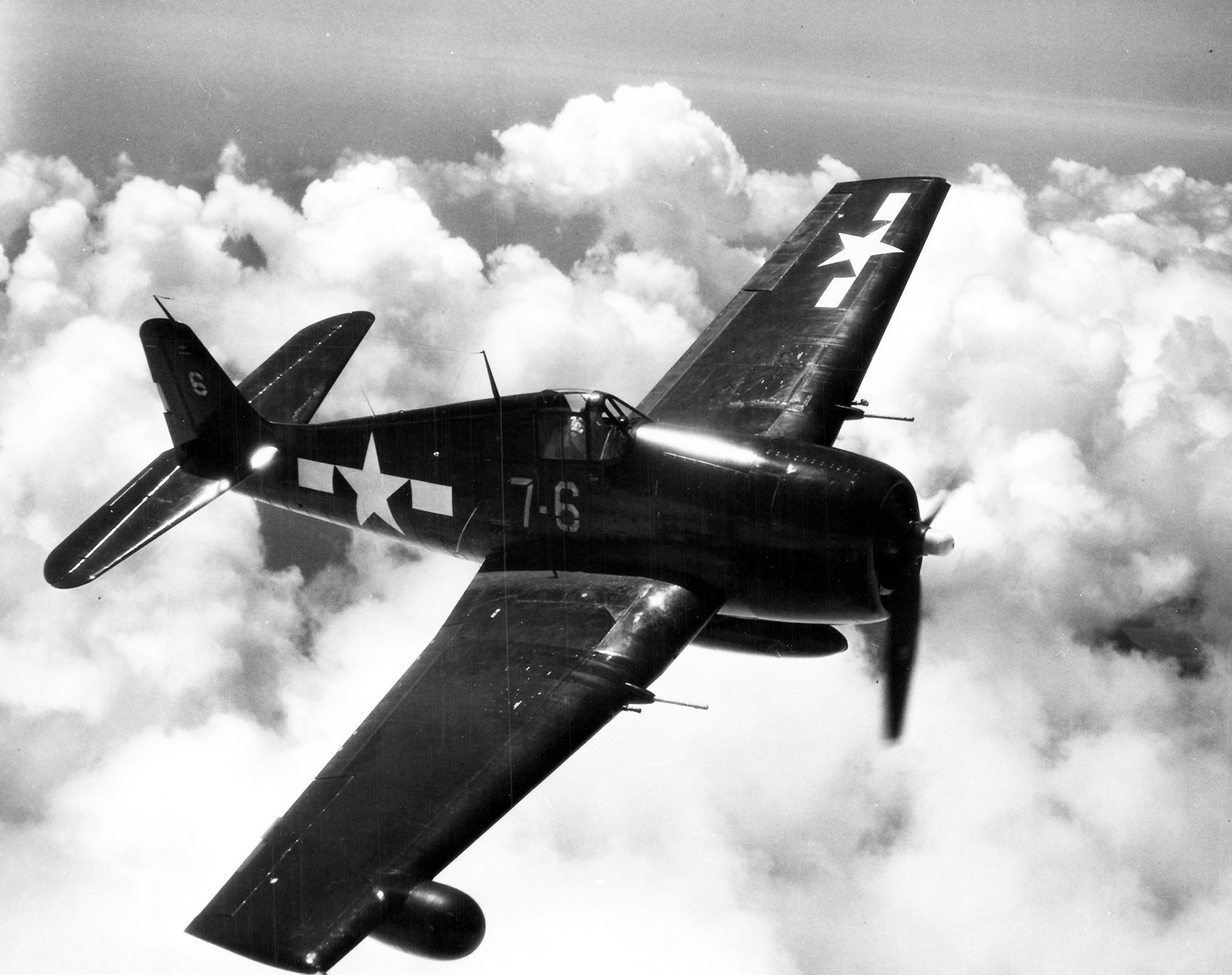
F6F-5N night fighter with AN/APS-6 radar and 2 20mm M2 cannon (c. 1944/45)

F6F-5N Hellcat (British Hellcat N.F. Mk II)
Night fighter version, fitted with an AN/APS-6 radar. Some were armed with two 20 mm (0.79 in) AN/M2 cannon in the inner wing bays and four 0.50 in (12.7 mm) M2 Browning machine guns in the outer.
F6F-5P Hellcat
Small numbers of F6F-5s were converted into photo-reconnaissance aircraft, with the camera equipment being fitted in the rear fuselage.
Hellcat FR. Mk. II
This designation was given to British Hellcats fitted with camera equipment.
FV-1
Proposed designation for Hellcats to be built by Canadian Vickers; cancelled before any built.

== Operators ==
France

- French Naval Aviation
- French Air Force

United Kingdom

- Royal Navy Fleet Air Arm

- Training units, and non-operational units

- 706 Naval Air Squadron Crew Pool & Refresher Flying Training School.
- 709 Naval Air Squadron Ground Attack School.
- 731 Naval Air Squadron Night Fighter Training School.
- 778 Naval Air Squadron Service Trials Unit (STU)
- 891 Naval Air Squadron not operational at war's end.
- 1847 Naval Air Squadron merged into 1840, not operational.

- East Indies units

- 800 Naval Air Squadron HMS Emperor, first operational unit
- 804 Naval Air Squadron HMS Ameer, HMS Emperor, HMS Shah, HMS Ravager
- 808 Naval Air Squadron HMS Khedive
- 888 Naval Air Squadron detachments only
- 896 Naval Air Squadron HMS Empress
- 898 Naval Air Squadron HMS Attacker/HMS Pursuer

- Atlantic & Mediterranean units

- 881 Naval Air Squadron HMS Pursuer
- 892 Naval Air Squadron HMS Premier
- 1832 Naval Air Squadron HMS Indomitable

- Pacific units

- 885 Naval Air Squadron HMS Ruler
- 1839 Naval Air Squadron NAS Eglington/HMS Indomitable
- 1840 Naval Air Squadron HMS Speaker
- 1844 Naval Air Squadron HMS Indomitable

United States

- United States Navy
- United States Marine Corps

Uruguay

- Uruguayan Navy

== Surviving aircraft ==
A relatively large number of Grumman F6Fs survive to this day, either in museums or in flyable condition. In order of Bu.No. they are:

=== United Kingdom ===
On display

F6F-5

- 79779 – Fleet Air Arm Museum in RNAS Yeovilton.

=== United States ===
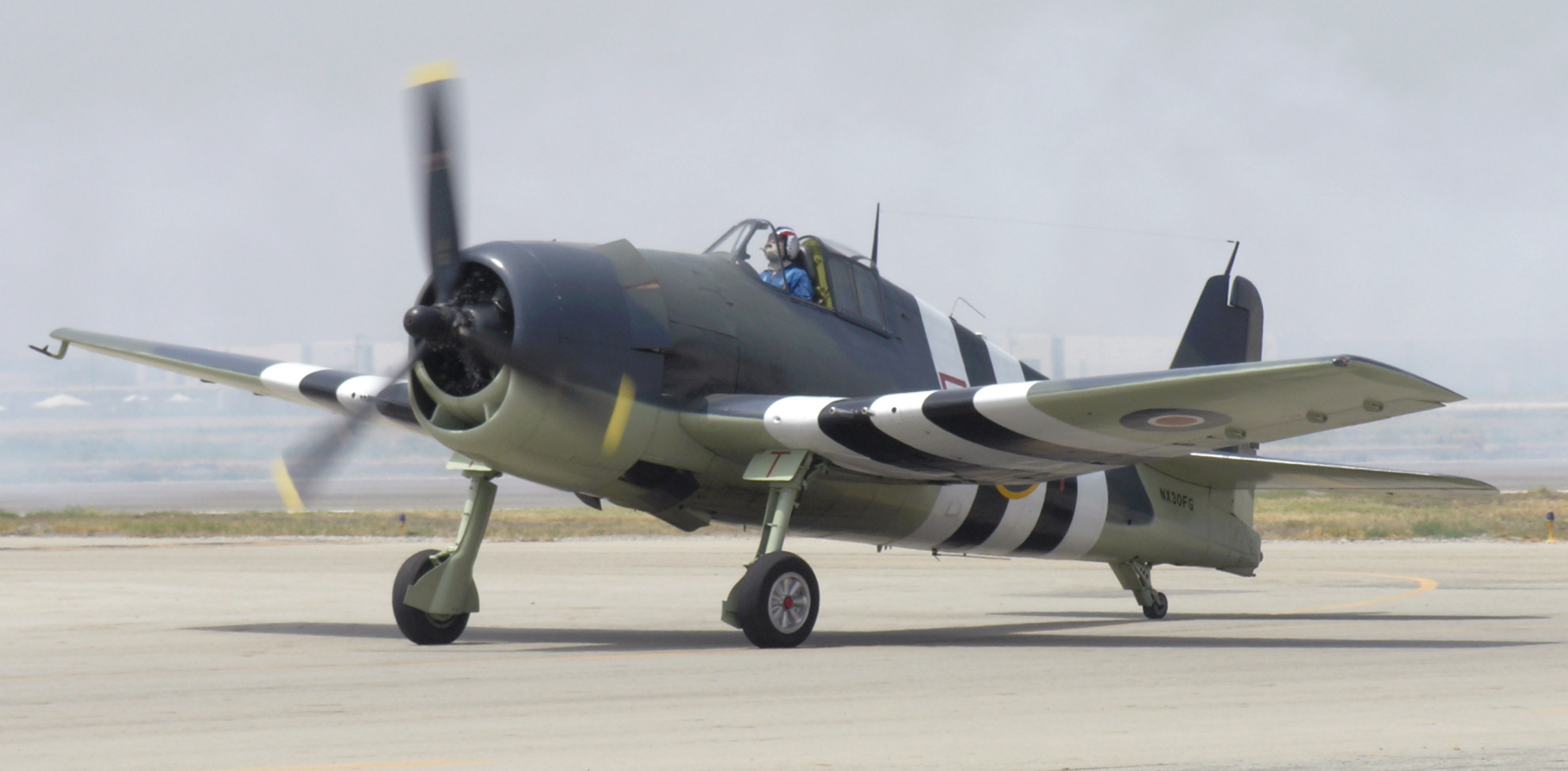
Chino Warbirds' F6F-3 painted as a Fleet Air Arm Hellcat Mk. I (2007)

Airworthy

F6F-3

- 08825 - based at Caldwell, Idaho.
- 41476 – based at the Collings Foundation in Stow, Massachusetts.
- 41930 – privately owned in Houston, Texas.

F6F-5

- 70222 – based at Commemorative Air Force (Southern California Wing) at Camarillo Airport (former Oxnard AFB) in Camarillo, California.
- 78645 – based at Fagen Fighters WWII Museum in Granite Falls, Minnesota.
- 79863 – based at Flying Heritage & Combat Armor Museum in Everett, Washington.
- 80141 - based at Lewis Air Legends in San Antonio, Texas.
- 94473 – based at Palm Springs Air Museum in Palm Springs, California.

F6F-5N

- 94204 – based at Erickson Aircraft Collection in Madras, Oregon.

On display

F6F-3

- 25910 – National Naval Aviation Museum at NAS Pensacola in Pensacola, Florida.
- 41834 – Steven F. Udvar-Hazy Center of the National Air and Space Museum in Chantilly, Virginia.
- 42874 – San Diego Aerospace Museum in San Diego, California.
- 66237 – Naval Air Station Wildwood Aviation Museum at Cape May Airport in Lower Township, New Jersey.

F6F-5

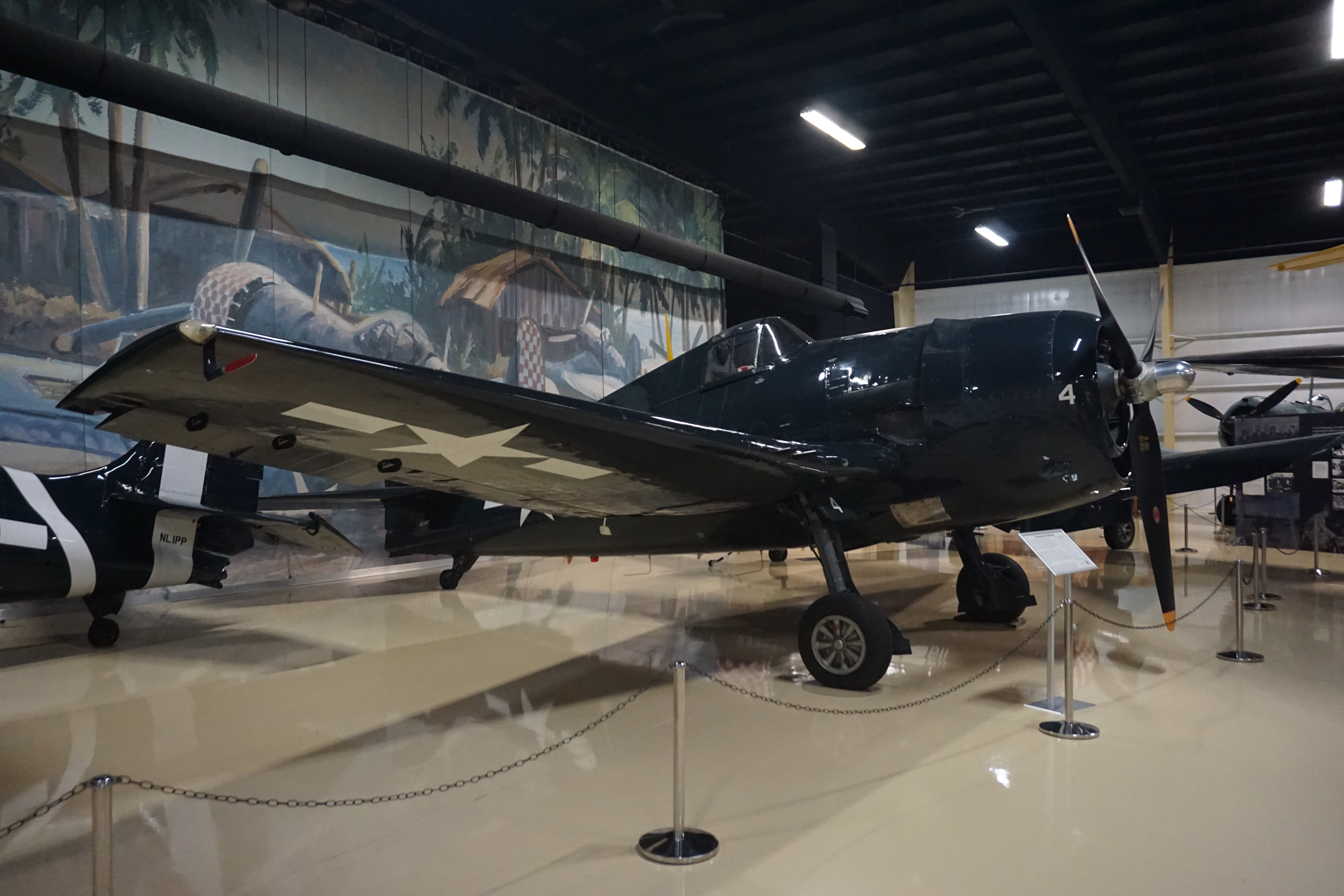
F6F-5 on display at the Air Zoo

- 77722 – Naval Air Facility Washington at Joint Base Andrews
- 79192 – New England Air Museum in Windsor Locks, Connecticut.
- 79593 – USS Yorktown/Patriots Point Naval & Maritime Museum in Mount Pleasant, South Carolina.
- 79683 – Air Zoo in Kalamazoo, Michigan.
- 94203 – National Naval Aviation Museum at NAS Pensacola in Pensacola, Florida.
- 94263 – Cradle of Aviation Museum in New York. It is on loan from the USMC Museum in Quantico, Virginia.

Under restoration or in storage

F6F-3

- 40467 - to airworthiness by Yanks Air Museum in Chino, California.
- 43014 – in storage at the Fantasy of Flight in Polk City, Florida.

F6F-5

- 72094 – to airworthiness by private owner in Caldwell, Idaho.
- 79133 – to airworthiness by private owner in Wilmington, Delaware.
- 80040 – to airworthiness by private owner in Wilmington, Delaware.
- 94038 – to airworthiness by private owner in Wilmington, Delaware.
- 94385 – to airworthiness by private owner in Livermore, California.

== Specifications (F6F-5 Hellcat) ==

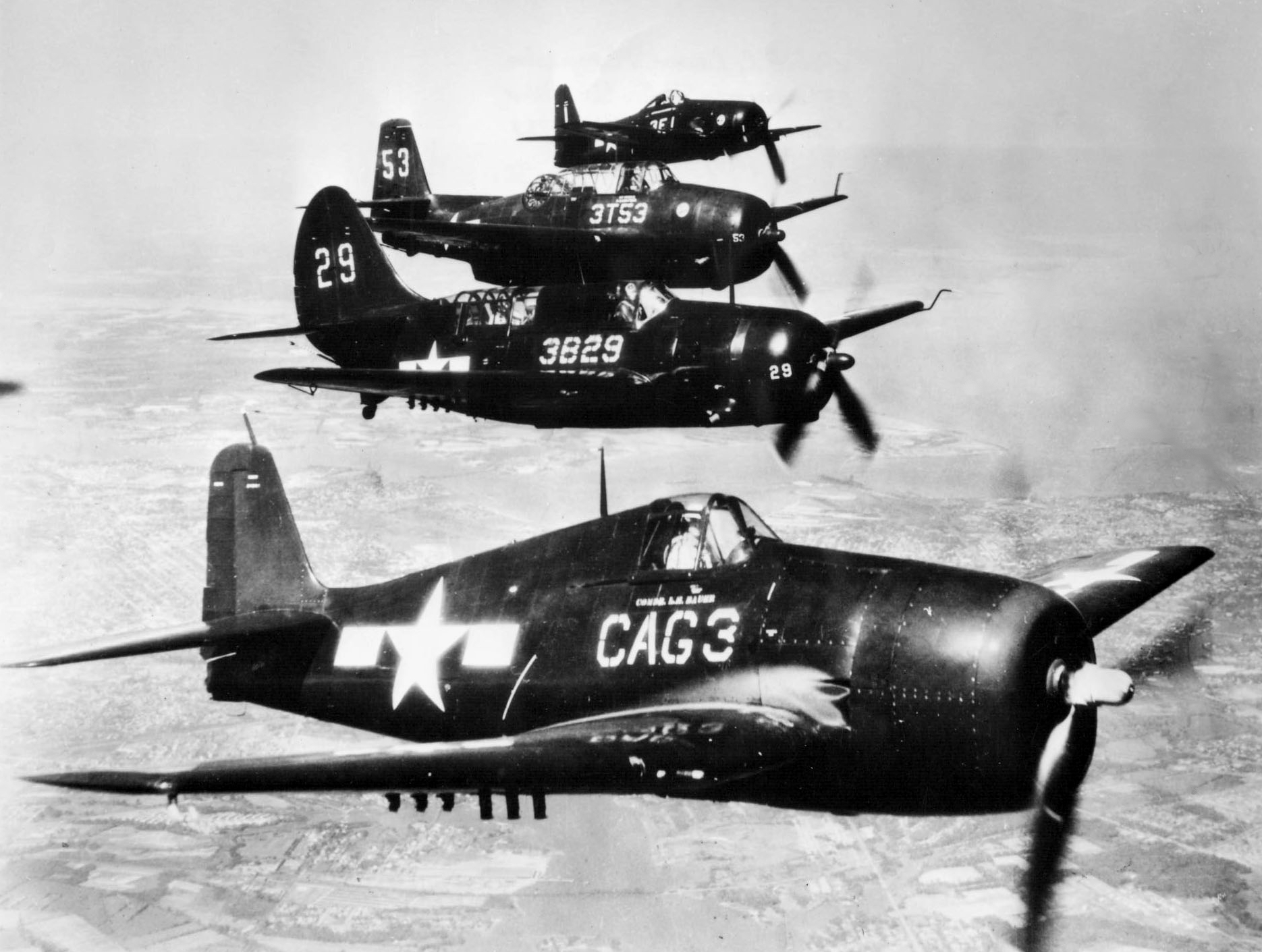
An F6F-5 flown by Air Group Commander (CAG), Cdr. Louis H. Bauer of Carrier Air Group 3 (CVG-3), leads a formation of CVG-3 aircraft (a Helldiver, Avenger and Bearcat) in 1946.

Data from WWII Aircraft PerformanceJane's Fighting Aircraft of World War IIStandard Aircraft Characteristics

General characteristics

- Crew: 1
- Length: 33 ft 7 in (10.24 m)
- Wingspan: 42 ft 10 in (13.06 m)
- Height: 13 ft 1 in (3.99 m)
- Wing area: 334 sq ft (31.0 m^{2})
- Aspect ratio: 5.5
- Airfoil: root: NACA 23015.6; tip: NACA 23009
- Empty weight: 9,238 lb (4,190 kg)
- Gross weight: 12,598 lb (5,714 kg)
- Max takeoff weight: 15,415 lb (6,992 kg)
- Fuel capacity: 250 US gal (208 imp gal; 946 L) internal; up to 3 × 150 US gal (125 imp gal; 568 L) external drop tanks
- Zero-lift drag coefficient: 0.0211
- Drag area: 7.05 sq ft (0.655 m^{2})
- Powerplant: 1 × Pratt & Whitney R-2800-10W Double Wasp 18-cylinder air-cooled radial piston engine, 2,200 hp (1,600 kW) with a two-speed two-stage supercharger and water injection
- Propellers: 3-bladed Hamilton Standard, 13 ft 1 in (3.99 m) diameter constant-speed propeller

Performance

- Maximum speed: 391 mph (629 km/h, 340 kn)
- Stall speed: 84 mph (135 km/h, 73 kn)
- Combat range: 945 mi (1,521 km, 821 nmi)
- Ferry range: 1,530 mi (2,460 km, 1,330 nmi)
- Service ceiling: 37,300 ft (11,400 m)
- Rate of climb: 2,600 ft/min (13 m/s)
- Time to altitude: 20,000 ft (6,096 m) in 7 minutes 42 seconds
- Lift-to-drag: 12.2
- Wing loading: 37.7 lb/sq ft (184 kg/m^{2})
- Power/mass: 0.16 hp/lb (0.26 kW/kg)
- Take-off run: 799 ft (244 m)

Armament

- Guns:
  - 6 × 0.50 in (12.7 mm) M2 Browning machine guns, with 400 rounds per gun, (All F6F-3, and most F6F-5) or
  - 2 × 0.79 in (20 mm) AN/M2 cannon, with 225 rounds per gun and 4 × 0.50 in (12.7 mm) Browning machine guns with 400 rounds per gun
- Rockets:
  - 6 × 5 in (127 mm) HVARs or
  - 2 × 11.75 in (298 mm) Tiny Tim unguided rockets
- Bombs: up to 4,000 lb (1,800 kg) full load, including:
  - Centerline rack:
    - 1 × 2,000 lb (910 kg) bomb or
    - 1 × Mark 13 torpedo;
  - Underwing bombs: (F6F-5 had two additional weapons racks either side of fuselage on wing center-section)
    - 2 × 1,000 lb (450 kg), 500 lb (230 kg), 250 lb (110 kg), or
    - 6 × 100 lb (45 kg) (Mk.3 Bomb Cluster)

== See also ==
- Alexander Vraciu, who had 19 victories in Hellcats flying with VF-6 (9) and VF-16 (10).
- Robert Duncan, U.S. Navy ace who scored the first victory against a Zero by an F6F Hellcat.
- David McCampbell, top U.S. Navy ace of World War II with all of his 34 victories in the Hellcat.
- Eugene A. Valencia Jr., VF-9's top World War II ace with 23 victories on Hellcats.
- Battle of Palmdale

Related development

- Grumman F4F Wildcat
- Grumman F8F Bearcat

Aircraft of comparable role, configuration, and era

- Focke-Wulf Fw 190
- Kawanishi N1K
- Kawasaki Ki-100
- Lavochkin La-5
- Mitsubishi J2M
- Mitsubishi A7M
- Nakajima Ki-84
- Republic P-47 Thunderbolt
- Vought F4U Corsair

Related lists

- List of aircraft of the Fleet Air Arm
- List of aircraft of the United States during World War II
- List of aircraft of World War II
- List of fighter aircraft
