= 1919 in the United States =

- Decades: 1890s; 1900s; 1910s; 1920s; 1930s
- See also: History of the United States (1918–1945); Timeline of United States history (1900–1929); List of years in the United States

Events from the year 1919 in the United States.

== Incumbents ==
=== Federal government ===
- President: Woodrow Wilson (D-New Jersey)
- Vice President: Thomas R. Marshall (D-Indiana)
- Chief Justice: Edward Douglass White (Louisiana)
- Speaker of the House of Representatives:

Champ Clark (D-Missouri) (until March 4)
Frederick H. Gillett (R-Massachusetts) (starting May 19)

- Congress: 65th (until March 4), 66th (starting March 4)

==== State governments ====
Governors and lieutenant governors

=== Governors ===
- Governor of Alabama: Charles Henderson (Democratic) (until January 20), Thomas Kilby (Democratic) (starting January 20)
- Governor of Arizona: George W. P. Hunt (Democratic) (until January 6), Thomas Edward Campbell (Republican) (starting January 6)
- Governor of Arkansas: Charles Hillman Brough (Democratic)
- Governor of California: William Stephens (Republican)
- Governor of Colorado: Julius Caldeen Gunter (Democratic) (until January 14), Oliver Henry Shoup (Republican) (starting January 14)
- Governor of Connecticut: Marcus H. Holcomb (Republican)
- Governor of Delaware: John G. Townsend Jr. (Republican)
- Governor of Florida: Sidney Johnston Catts (Prohibition)
- Governor of Georgia: Hugh M. Dorsey (Democratic)
- Governor of Idaho: Moses Alexander (Democratic) (until January 6), D. W. Davis (Republican) (starting January 6)
- Governor of Illinois: Frank O. Lowden (Republican)
- Governor of Indiana: James P. Goodrich (Republican)
- Governor of Iowa: William L. Harding (Republican)
- Governor of Kansas: Arthur Capper (Republican) (until January 13), Henry J. Allen (Republican) (starting January 13)
- Governor of Kentucky:
  - until May 19: Augustus O. Stanley (Democratic)
  - May 19-December 9: James D. Black (Democratic)
  - starting December 9: Edwin P. Morrow (Republican)
- Governor of Louisiana: Ruffin G. Pleasant (Democratic)
- Governor of Maine: Carl E. Milliken (Republican)
- Governor of Maryland: Emerson C. Harrington (Democratic)
- Governor of Massachusetts: Samuel W. McCall (Republican) (until January 2), Calvin Coolidge (Republican) (starting January 2)
- Governor of Michigan: Albert Sleeper (Republican)
- Governor of Minnesota: J. A. A. Burnquist (Republican)
- Governor of Mississippi: Theodore G. Bilbo (Democratic)
- Governor of Missouri: Frederick D. Gardner (Democratic)
- Governor of Montana: Sam V. Stewart (Democratic)
- Governor of Nebraska: Keith Neville (Democratic) (until January 9), Samuel R. McKelvie (Republican) (starting January 9)
- Governor of Nevada: Emmet D. Boyle (Democratic)
- Governor of New Hampshire: Henry W. Keyes (Republican) (until January 6), John H. Bartlett (Republican) (starting January 6)
- Governor of New Jersey: Walter Evans Edge (Republican) (until May 16), William Nelson Runyon (Republican) (starting May 16)
- Governor of New Mexico: Washington E. Lindsey (Republican) (until January 1), Octaviano Ambrosio Larrazolo (Republican) (starting January 1)
- Governor of New York: Al Smith (Democratic) (starting January 1)
- Governor of North Carolina: Thomas Walter Bickett (Democratic)
- Governor of North Dakota: Lynn Frazier (Republican)
- Governor of Ohio: James M. Cox (Democratic)
- Governor of Oklahoma: Robert L. Williams (Democratic) (until January 13), James B. A. Robertson (Democratic) (starting January 13)
- Governor of Oregon: James Withycombe (Republican) (until March 3), Ben W. Olcott (Republican) (starting March 3)
- Governor of Pennsylvania: Martin Grove Brumbaugh (Republican) (until January 21), William Cameron Sproul (Republican) (starting January 21)
- Governor of Rhode Island: R. Livingston Beeckman (Republican)
- Governor of South Carolina: Richard Irvine Manning III (Democratic) (until January 21), Robert Archer Cooper (Democratic) (starting January 21)
- Governor of South Dakota: Peter Norbeck (Republican)
- Governor of Tennessee: Tom C. Rye (Democratic) (until January 15), A. H. Roberts (Democratic) (starting January 15)
- Governor of Texas: William P. Hobby (Democratic)
- Governor of Utah: Simon Bamberger (Democratic)
- Governor of Vermont: Horace F. Graham (Republican) (until January 9), Percival W. Clement (Republican) (starting January 9)
- Governor of Virginia: Westmoreland Davis (Democratic)
- Governor of Washington: Ernest Lister (Democratic) (until February 13), Louis Folwell Hart (Republican) (starting February 13)
- Governor of West Virginia: John J. Cornwell (Democratic)
- Governor of Wisconsin: Emanuel L. Philipp (Republican)
- Governor of Wyoming: Frank L. Houx (Democratic) (until January 6), Robert D. Carey (Republican) (starting January 6)

=== Lieutenant governors ===
- Lieutenant Governor of Alabama: Thomas E. Kilby (Democratic) (until January 20), Nathan Lee Miller (Democratic) (starting January 20)
- Lieutenant Governor of California: vacant (until January 6), Clement Calhoun Young (Republican) (starting January 6)
- Lieutenant Governor of Colorado: James A. Pulliam (Democratic) (until January 14), George Stepham (Republican) (starting January 14)
- Lieutenant Governor of Connecticut: Clifford B. Wilson (Republican)
- Lieutenant Governor of Delaware: Lewis E. Eliason (Democratic) (until May 2), vacant (starting May 2)
- Lieutenant Governor of Idaho: Ernest L. Parker (Democratic) (until January 6), Charles C. Moore (Republican) (starting January 6)
- Lieutenant Governor of Illinois: John G. Oglesby (Republican)
- Lieutenant Governor of Indiana: Edgar D. Bush (Republican)
- Lieutenant Governor of Iowa: Ernest Robert Moore (Republican)
- Lieutenant Governor of Kansas: William Yoast Morgan (Republican) (until January 13), Charles S. Huffman (Republican) (starting January 13)
- Lieutenant Governor of Kentucky:
  - until May 19: James D. Black (Democratic)
  - May 19-December 9: vacant
  - starting December 9: S. Thruston Ballard (Republican)
- Lieutenant Governor of Louisiana: Fernand Mouton (Democratic)
- Lieutenant Governor of Massachusetts: Calvin Coolidge (Republican) (until January 6), Channing H. Cox (Republican) (starting January 6)
- Lieutenant Governor of Michigan: Luren D. Dickinson (Republican)
- Lieutenant Governor of Minnesota: Thomas Frankson (Republican)
- Lieutenant Governor of Mississippi: Lee Maurice Russell (Democratic)
- Lieutenant Governor of Missouri: Wallace Crossley (Democratic)
- Lieutenant Governor of Montana: W. W. McDowell (Democratic)
- Lieutenant Governor of Nebraska: Edgar Howard (Democratic) (until January 9), Pelham A. Barrows (Republican) (starting January 9)
- Lieutenant Governor of Nevada: Maurice J. Sullivan (Democratic)
- Lieutenant Governor of New Mexico: vacant (until January 1), Benjamin F. Pankey (Republican) (starting January 1)
- Lieutenant Governor of New York: Harry C. Walker (Democratic) (starting January 1)
- Lieutenant Governor of North Carolina: Oliver Max Gardner (Democratic)
- Lieutenant Governor of North Dakota: Anton T. Kraabel (Republican) (until month and day unknown), Howard R. Wood (Republican) (starting month and day unknown)
- Lieutenant Governor of Ohio: Earl D. Bloom (Democratic) (until January 12), Clarence J. Brown Sr. (Republican) (starting January 12)
- Lieutenant Governor of Oklahoma: Martin E. Trapp (Democratic)
- Lieutenant Governor of Pennsylvania: Frank B. McClain (Republican) (until January 20), Edward E. Beidleman (Republican) (starting January 20)
- Lieutenant Governor of Rhode Island: Emery J. San Souci (Republican)
- Lieutenant Governor of South Carolina: Andrew Bethea (Democratic) (until January 21), J. T. Liles (Democratic) (starting January 21)
- Lieutenant Governor of South Dakota: William H. McMaster (Republican)
- Lieutenant Governor of Tennessee: W. R. Crabtree (Democratic) (until month and day unknown), Andrew L. Todd Sr. (Democratic) (starting month and day unknown)
- Lieutenant Governor of Texas: vacant (until January 21), Willard Arnold Johnson (Democratic) (starting January 21)
- Lieutenant Governor of Vermont: Roger W. Hulburd (Republican) (until January 9), Mason S. Stone (Republican) (starting January 9)
- Lieutenant Governor of Virginia: Benjamin Franklin Buchanan (Democratic)
- Lieutenant Governor of Washington: Louis Folwell Hart (Republican) (until February 13), vacant (starting February 13)
- Lieutenant Governor of Wisconsin: Edward F. Dithmar (Republican)

== Events ==
=== January ===
- January 1 – Edsel Ford succeeds his father as head of the Ford Motor Company.
- January 6 – Theodore Roosevelt, the 26th president of the United States, dies in his sleep at the age of 60.
- January 15 – The Boston Molasses Disaster: A wave of molasses released from an exploding storage tank sweeps through Boston, killing 21 and injuring 150.
- January 16 – The Eighteenth Amendment to the United States Constitution, authorizing Prohibition, goes into effect in the United States.
- January 20 – Thomas Kilby is sworn in as the 36th governor of Alabama replacing Charles Henderson.
- January 22 – The United States recognizes the independence of Poland.
- January 25 – The Hotel Pennsylvania opens in Manhattan.

=== February ===
- February 6 – The Seattle General Strike begins. Over 65,000 workers strike.
- February 11 – The Seattle General Strike ends when Federal troops are summoned by the state of Washington's Attorney General.
- February 25 – Oregon places a 1 cent per U.S. gallon (.26¢/L) tax on gasoline, becoming the first U.S. state to levy a gasoline tax.
- February 26 – An act of the United States Congress establishes most of the Grand Canyon as a United States National Park (see Grand Canyon National Park).

=== March ===
- March 3 – The Supreme Court of the United States upholds the conviction of Charles Schenck.
- March 5 – A. Mitchell Palmer becomes Attorney General of the United States through recess appointment.
- March 15 – The American Legion forms in Paris.

=== April ===
- April 13 – Eugene V. Debs enters prison at the Atlanta Federal Penitentiary in Atlanta, Georgia for speaking out against the draft during World War I.
- April 15 – Boston Telephone Strike of 1919 begins. Ends successfully for the telephone operators and supporters on April 20.
- April 30 – Several bombs are intercepted in the first wave of the 1919 United States anarchist bombings carried out by followers of Luigi Galleani.

=== May ===
- May 1 – Riots break out on International Labor Day in Cleveland, Ohio; 2 people are killed, 40 injured, and 116 arrested.
- May 9 – The United States recognizes the independence of Finland.
- May 10 – Charleston riot in Charleston, South Carolina killing three black men; beginning of Red Summer.
- May 16 – A U.S. Navy Curtiss aircraft (NC-4), commanded by Albert Cushing Read, departs Trepassey, Newfoundland, for Lisbon via the Azores on the first transatlantic flight.
- May 23 – The University of California, Los Angeles (UCLA) is established as the Southern Branch of the University of California, making it the second-oldest undergraduate campus of the ten-campus University of California system. The school's motto is Fiat lux, "Let there be light."

=== June ===
- June 2 – Eight mail bombs are sent to prominent figures as part of the 1919 United States anarchist bombings.
- June 4 – Women's rights: The United States Congress approves the Nineteenth Amendment to the United States Constitution, which would guarantee suffrage to women, and sends it to the U.S. states for ratification.
- June 5 – Baltimore Mine Tunnel Disaster.
- June 15 – Pancho Villa attacks Ciudad Juárez. When the bullets begin to fly to the U.S. side of the border, two units of the U.S. 7th Cavalry Regiment cross the border and repulse Villa's forces.
- June 28 – The Treaty of Versailles is signed, ending World War I.
- June – The Algonquin Round Table group of writers, critics, actors and wits led by Alexander Woollcott first meets at the Algonquin Hotel in New York City.

=== July ===
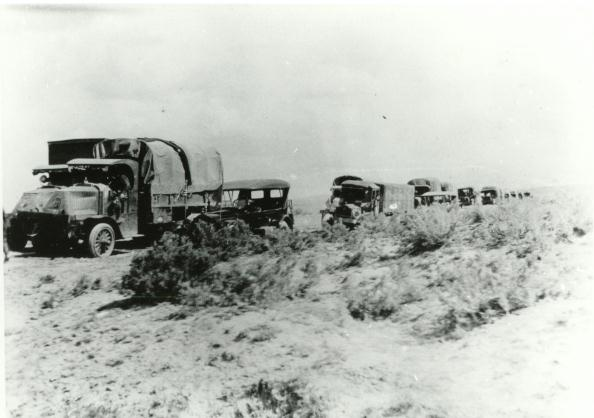
July 7–September 6: The First Transcontinental Motor Convoy

- July 1 – "Thirsty First": The Wartime Prohibition Act comes into effect.
- July 6 – The British dirigible airship R34 lands at Mineola, New York, completing the first transatlantic flight by airship.
- July 7 – The First Transcontinental Motor Convoy: The U.S. Army sends an expedition across the continental U.S., starting in Washington, D.C., to determine how well troops could be moved from one side of the country to the other by motor vehicles.
- July 18 – 1919 Kimball mining disaster.
- July 21 – Wingfoot Air Express crash: The Goodyear dirigible airship Wingfoot Air Express catches fire over downtown Chicago and crashes into the Illinois Trust and Savings Building; 2 passengers, 1 crew member, and 10 people on the ground are killed; 2 people parachute to the ground safely.
- July 27 – The Chicago Race Riot of 1919 begins when a white man throws rocks at a group of 4 black teens on a raft.

=== August ===
- August 1–6 – 1919 Streetcar Strike of Los Angeles occurs.
- August 11 – The first NFL team for Wisconsin (the Green Bay Packers) is founded by Curly Lambeau.
- August 30 – After a three-way splintering of the Socialist Party of America, the leadership of the remaining 30,000 members of the Right Wing of the Socialist party continue their national convention in Chicago on August 30, 1919.
- August 31 – In a three-way splintering of the Socialist Party of America, the leadership of the 10,000 native-born English speaking members of the Left Wing form the Communist Labor Party of America in Chicago on August 31, 1919.

=== September ===
- September 1 – In a three-way splintering of the Socialist Party of America, the leadership of the 60,000 alien members of the Left Wing form the Communist Party of America at a separate convention in Chicago on September 1, 1919.
- September 6 – The First Transcontinental Motor Convoy: The U.S. Army expedition across America, which started July 7, ends in San Francisco.
- September 9 – The Boston Police Strike occurs.
- September 10 – September 15: The Florida Keys Hurricane kills 600 in the Gulf of Mexico, Florida and Texas.
- September 15 – the International Conference of Women Physicians, the first international conference of women physicians in history, convened in New York City, and ended on October 25
- September 22 – The Steel strike of 1919 begins across the United States.
- September 28 – Omaha Riot: A lynch mob besieges the police station and courthouse in Omaha, Nebraska, and lynches alleged rapist Will Brown.

=== October ===
- October 1 – The Elaine massacre breaks out in Arkansas.
- October 2 – President Woodrow Wilson suffers a massive stroke, leaving him partially paralyzed.
- October 9 – Black Sox Scandal: The Chicago White Sox throw the World Series.
- October 16 – Ripley's Believe It or Not! first appears as a cartoon under this title in The New York Globe.
- October 28 – Prohibition begins: The United States Congress passes the Volstead Act over President Woodrow Wilson's veto.

=== November ===
- November 1 – The UMW Coal Strike of 1919 begins in the United States by the United Mine Workers under John L. Lewis. Final agreement comes on December 10.
- November 7 – The first of the Palmer Raids is conducted on the second anniversary of the Russian Revolution: over 10,000 suspected communists and anarchists are arrested in 23 different U.S. cities by the end of January 1920.
- November 9 – Felix the Cat appears in Feline Follies, making him the first cartoon character.
- November 10 – The first national convention of the American Legion is held in Minneapolis, Minnesota (until November 12).
- November 11 – The Centralia Massacre in Centralia, Washington results in the deaths of four members of the American Legion, and the lynching of a local leader of the Industrial Workers of the World (IWW).
- November 14 – Sigma Delta Pi, the National Collegiate Hispanic Honor Society (La Sociedad Nacional Honoraria Hispánica), was established at the University of California Berkeley in Berkeley, California.
- November 19 – The Treaty of Versailles fails a critical ratification vote in the United States Senate. It will never be ratified by the US.
- November 27 – Kappa Kappa Psi, National Honorary Band Fraternity, is established at Oklahoma A&M College (now named Oklahoma State University) in Stillwater, Oklahoma.

=== December ===
- December 19 – The fictional character Ham Gravy makes his début in Thimble Theatre comics.
- December 21 – The United States deports 249 people, including Emma Goldman, to Russia during the Red Scare.
- December 26 – Babe Ruth is sold by the Boston Red Sox to the New York Yankees for $125,000, the largest sum ever paid for a player at that time. The deal is announced on January 6, 1920 and begins the 86-year-long "Curse of the Bambino".

=== Undated ===
- Various strikes occur in the United States: Strike of US railroad workers; The Longshoreman's strike; The Great Steel Strike; and a general strike in Seattle, Washington.
- US President Wilson promises eventual independence for Philippines, though subsequent Republican administrations see it as a distant goal.
- The World League Against Alcoholism is established by the Anti-Saloon League.
- First Security Bank – Montana is founded (as Security Bank and Trust).

=== Ongoing ===
- Progressive Era (1890s–1920s)
- Lochner era (c. 1897–c. 1937)
- U.S. occupation of Haiti (1915–1934)
- U.S. occupation of the Dominican Republic (1916-1924)
- First Red Scare (1917–1920)

== Births ==
=== January ===
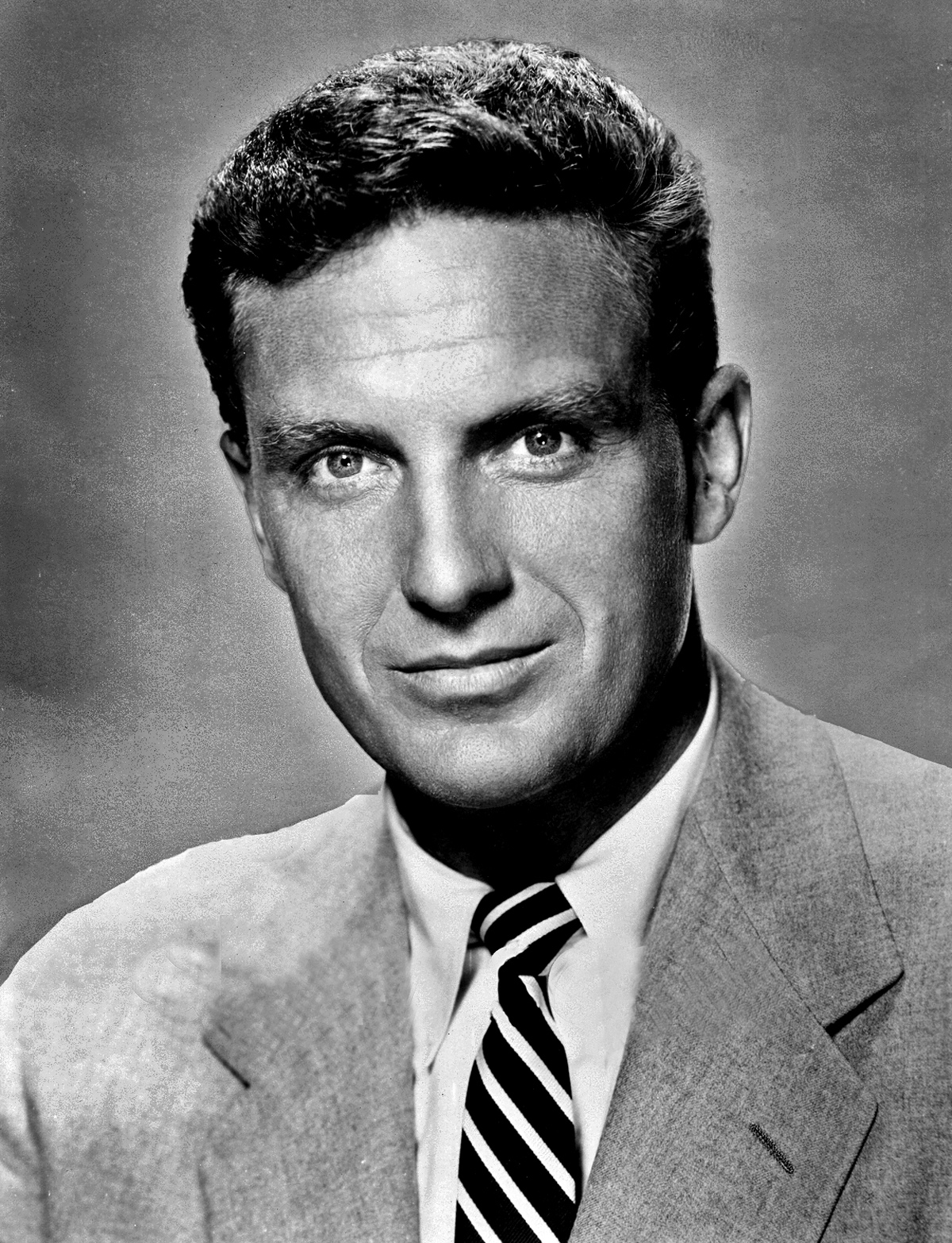
Robert Stack

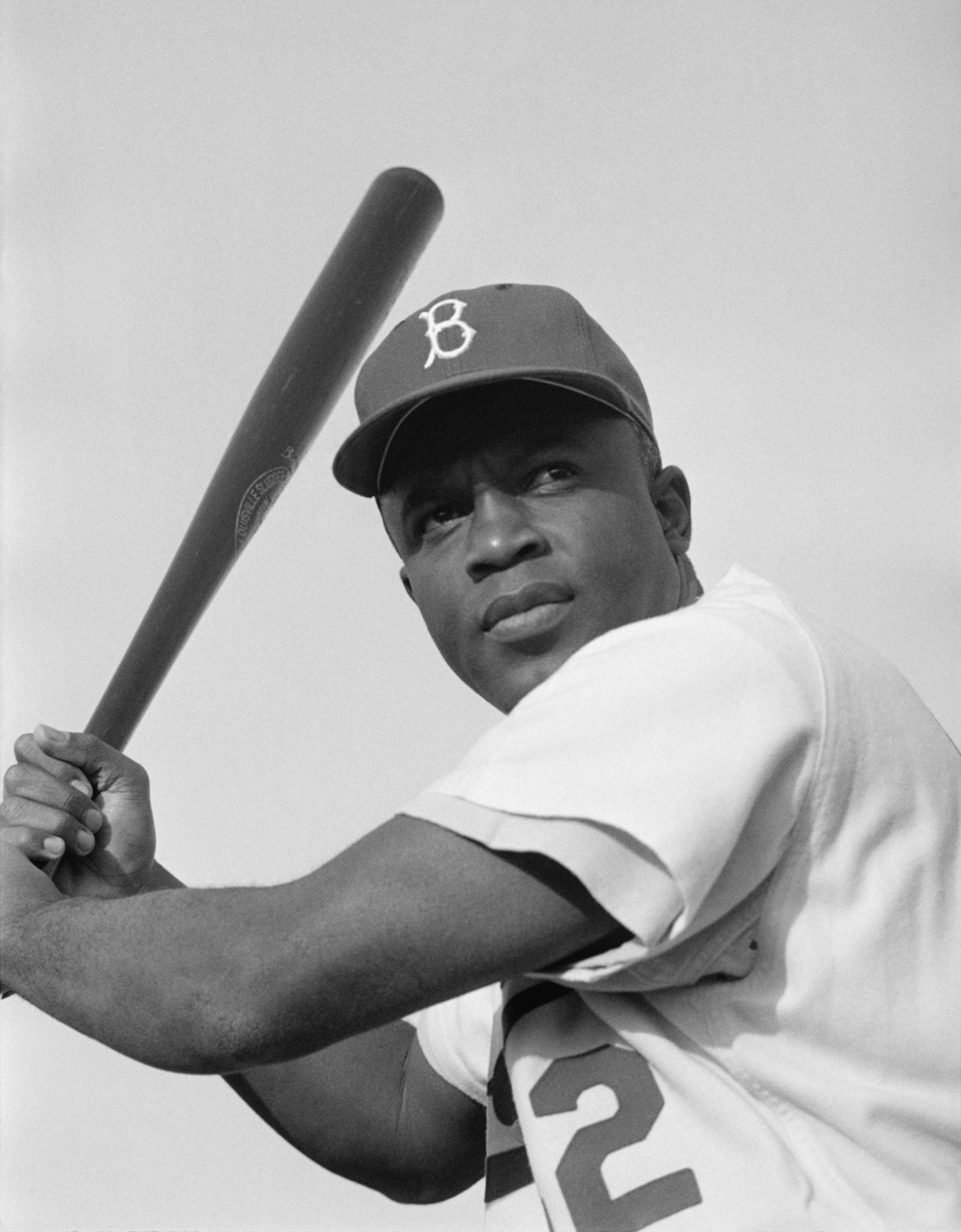
Jackie Robinson

- January 1 – J. D. Salinger, author notable for the novel Catcher in the Rye (died 2010)
- January 2 – Charles Willeford, writer (died 1988)
- January 3
  - Zara Cisco Brough, Nipmuc Chief (died 1988)
  - Dorothy Morrison, actress (died 2017)
- January 4 – Lester L. Wolff, politician (died 2021)
- January 7 – Steve Belichick, American football player, coach and scout (died 2005)
- January 10 – Amzie Strickland, actress (died 2006)
- January 13 – Robert Stack, actor (The Untouchables) (died 2003)
- January 14 – Andy Rooney, journalist (60 Minutes) (died 2011)
- January 23 – Ernie Kovacs, American comedian (died 1962)
- January 24 – Leon Kirchner, American composer (d. 2009)
- January 25
  - Edwin Newman, journalist and writer (NBC Nightly News) (died 2010)
  - Eula Beal, contralto (died 2008)
- January 27 – Ross Bagdasarian Sr., actor, pianist, singer, songwriter, record producer and creator of Alvin and the Chipmunks (died 1972)
- January 28 – Gabby Gabreski, American fighter ace (d. 2002)
- January 30
  - John C. Elliott, politician and 39th Governor of American Samoa (1952) (died 2001)
  - Fred Korematsu, Japanese-American civil rights activist (d. 2005)
- January 31 – Jackie Robinson, African-American baseball player (d. 1972)

=== February ===
- February 7 – Desmond Doss, American combat medic (died 2006)
- February 9, Protestant ecumenical theologian (died 2004)
  - Robert Martin, fighter pilot (died 2018)
- February 12 – Forrest Tucker, actor (F Troop) (died 1986)
- February 15 – Norman Garbo, author and lecturer (died 2017)
- February 13
  - Tennessee Ernie Ford, musician (died 1991)
  - Eddie Robinson, football coach (died 2007)
- February 16 – Charlie Parlato, musician (died 2007)
- February 18 – Jack Palance, actor (died 2006)
- February 19 – William Gianelli, politician (died 2020)
- February 21 – Malcolm Beard, politician (died 2019)
- February 25 – Monte Irvin, African-American baseball player (died 2016)
- February 26 – Mason Adams, actor (died 2005)

=== March ===
- March 2 – Jennifer Jones, actress (died 2009)
- March 4 – Buck Baker, racecar driver (died 2002)
- March 5 – Myron H. Bright, U.S. federal judge (died 2016)
- March 7 – Mary Ann Hawkins, surfing pioneer, diver, swimmer and stunt double (died 1993)
- March 13 – Jack P. Lewis, Biblical scholar (died 2018)
- March 14 – Max Shulman, comedic writer (died 1988)
- March 15 – Lawrence Tierney, actor (died 2002)
- March 17 – Nat King Cole, African-American singer (died 1965)
- March 24
  - Lawrence Ferlinghetti, poet and publisher (died 2021)
  - Robert Heilbroner, economist (died 2005)
- March 25 – Jeanne Cagney, actress (died 1984)
- March 26 – Strother Martin, actor (died 1980)
- March 27 – John Kotz, basketball player (died 1999)
- March 28 – Dewey F. Bartlett, U.S. Senator from Oklahoma from 1967 to 1971 (died 1979)
- March 29 – Eileen Heckart, actress (died 2001)
- March 30 – McGeorge Bundy, U.S. National Security Advisor (died 1996)

=== April ===
- April 1 – Joseph Murray, transplant surgeon, Nobel Prize laureate (died 2012)
- April 3 – Ervin Drake, songwriter (died 2015)
- April 4 – Charles O. Porter, politician (died 2006)
- April 6 – Caren Marsh Doll, actress and dancer
- April 12 – Billy Vaughn, singer, multi-instrumentalist and orchestra leader (died 1991)
- April 13
  - Howard Keel, singer, dancer and actor (Dallas) (died 2004)
  - Madalyn Murray O'Hair, née Mays, atheist activist (died 1995)
  - Phil Tonken, radio and television announcer (died 2000)
- April 16
  - Merce Cunningham, dancer and choreographer (died 2009)
  - Edward Simons Fulmer, American Army Air Forces officer (died 2017)
- April 18 – Samuel L. Myers Sr., economist (died 2021)
- April 22 – Donald J. Cram, chemist, Nobel Prize laureate (d. 2001)
- April 27 – Victor Wouk, scientist (died 2005)

=== May ===
- May 1 – Lewis Hill, broadcaster, co-founder of Pacifica Radio (d. 1957)
- May 3
  - John Cullen Murphy, comic strip artist (died 2004)
  - Pete Seeger, folk singer and musician (died 2014)
- May 4 – Dory Funk, professional wrestler (died 1973)
- May 8 – Lex Barker, actor (died 1973)
- May 10 – Daniel Bell, sociologist (died 2011)
- May 16 – Liberace, pianist (died 1987)
- May 17 – Ronald Verlin Cassill, novelist, short story writer, editor, painter, and lithographer (died 2002)
- May 20 – George Gobel, comedian (died 1991)
- May 21 – Wense Grabarek, politician (died 2019)
- May 30 – Joe McQueen, jazz saxophonist (died 2019)
- May 31 – Vance Hartke, U.S. Senator from Indiana from 1959 to 1977 (died 2003)

=== June ===
- June 6 – Doris Merrick, actress and model (died 2019)
- June 7 – George Glamack, basketball player (died 1987)
- June 9 – Jimmy Newberry, baseball player (died 1983)
- June 11 – Helen Tobias-Duesberg, Estonian-American pianist and composer (died 2010)
- June 14 – Gene Barry, actor (died 2009)
- June 15 – Charles Kaman, aeronautical engineer (died 2011)
- June 19 – Pauline Kael, film critic (died 2001)
- June 22 – Clifton McNeely, basketball player and coach (died 2003)
- June 23 – R. C. Pitts, basketball player (died 2011)
- June 24
  - Al Molinaro, actor (died 2015)
  - Jack Naylor, inventor (died 2007)
- June 26
  - George Athan Billias, historian (died 2018)
  - Richard Neustadt, political historian (died 2003)
- June 28 – Joseph P. Lordi, government official (died 1983)
- June 30 – Ed Yost, inventor (died 2007)

=== July ===
- July 1 – Gerald E. Miller, vice admiral (died 2014)
- July 7
  - William Kunstler, lawyer and civil rights activist (died 1995)
  - Earl Mazo, journalist, author, and government official (died 2007)
  - Harry Zeller, professional basketball player (died 2004)
- July 11 – Donald Zilversmit, Dutch-born U.S. nutritional biochemist, researcher and educator (died 2010)
- July 13
  - Joe Gill, magazine writer and comic book scripter (died 2006)
  - William F. Quinn, politician (died 2006)
- July 14
  - Cleveland Clark, Negro league baseball player
  - Marion F. Kirby, ace in the United States Army Air Forces (died 2011)
  - Hal Lahar, American football player and coach (died 2003)
  - Eugene Allen, waiter and butler (died 2010)
- July 15
  - Mike Karmazin, American football guard (died 2004)
  - Everett P. Pope, United States Marine (died 2009)
- July 17 – Milt Smith, American football player and business operator (died 2010)
- July 19 – Dallas McKennon, voice actor (died 2009)
- July 22 – Allie Paine, college basketball standout (died 2008)
- July 26 – Virginia Gilmore, actress (died 1986)
- July 31 – Robert M. Morgenthau, lawyer (died 2019)

=== August ===
- August 13
  - Rex Humbard, television evangelist (died 2007)
  - George Shearing, Anglo-American jazz pianist (died 2011)
- August 14 – Isaac C. Kidd Jr., admiral (died 1999)
- August 17 – Georgia Gibbs, singer (died 2006)
- August 18 – Walter Joseph Hickel, 2nd and 8th Governor of Alaska (died 2010)
- August 20
  - Walter Bernstein, screenwriter and producer (died 2021)
  - Thomas G. Morris, politician (died 2016)
- August 21 – Sister Jean, religious sister (died 2025)
- August 22 – Larry Winn, American politician (died 2017)
- August 25 – George Wallace, 45th Governor of Alabama (died 1998)
- August 28 – Ben Agajanian, American football player (died 2018)
- August 29 – Sono Osato, dancer and actress (died 2018)

=== September ===
- September 4 – Howard Morris, actor (d. 2005)
- September 5 – Tom Jordan, Major League Baseball player (died 2019)
- September 6
  - Lee Archer, U.S. fighter pilot (died 2010)
- September 9 – Barbara Fiske Calhoun, American WWII cartoonist and painter; co-founded Quarry Hill Creative Center in Rochester, Vermont, where she taught art and helped establish the ideals of the group. Born Isabelle Daniel Hall in Tucson, Arizona (Died 2014).
  - John Mitchum, actor (died 2001)
- September 14 – Kay Medford, character actress and comedian (died 1980)
- September 24
  - Rick Vallin, Russian-American actor (died 1977)
  - Jack Costanzo, percussionist (died 2018)
  - Dayton Allen, comedian and voice actor (died 2004)
- September 27
  - Jayne Meadows, actress (d. 2015)
  - Charles H. Percy, U.S. Senator from Illinois from 1967 to 1985 (died 2011)

=== October ===
- October 3 – James M. Buchanan, economist, Nobel Prize laureate (died 2013)
- October 11 – Art Blakey, jazz drummer (died 1990)
- October 12
  - Mary Ainslee, film actress (died 1991)
  - Doris Miller, sailor (died 1943)
- October 13 – Jackie Ronne, born Edith Maslin, Antarctic explorer (died 2009)
- October 14 – Edward L. Feightner, U.S. navy officer (d. 2020)
- October 15 – Chuck Stevenson, race car driver (died 1995)
- October 16 – Kathleen Winsor, writer (died 2003)
- October 17 – Charles Y. Glock, sociologist (died 2018)
- October 18 – Anita O'Day, jazz singer (died 2006)
- October 21 – Donald West VanArtsdalen, federal judge (died 2019)
- October 25 – Norman A. Erbe, 35th Governor of Iowa (died 2000)
- October 26
  - Edward Brooke, U.S. Senator from Massachusetts from 1967 to 1979 (died 2015)
  - James E. Myers, songwriter (died 2001)
  - Jacob Pressman, rabbi, co-founder of American Jewish University (died 2015)
- October 27 – Jeremiah Stamler, cardiologist (died 2018)
- October 30 – Takuma Tanada, Japanese-American biologist (died 2018)

=== November ===
- November 2 – Bill Mills, Major League Baseball player (died 2019)
- November 3
  - Bert Freed, American character actor and voice-over actor (died 1994)
  - Spider Jorgensen, baseball player and coach (died 2003)
- November 4
  - Martin Balsam, actor (died 1996)
  - Shirley Mitchell, actress (died 2013)
- November 5 – Myron Floren, accordionist (The Lawrence Welk Show) (died 2005)
- November 10 – Michael Strank, U.S. Marine flag raiser on Iwo Jima (died 1945)
- November 15
  - Carol Bruce, singer and actress (died 2007)
  - Leo Marx, historian and literary critic (died 2022)
  - Joseph Wapner, judge and TV personality (died 2017)
- November 19
  - Ken Buehler, basketball player (died 2019)
  - Elizabeth Strohfus, aviator (died 2016)
- November 26 – Frederik Pohl, science fiction writer (died 2013)
- November 30 – Johnnie Jones, civil rights attorney (died 2022)
- November 30 – Oliver Red Cloud, chief of the Oglala Sioux (died 2013)

=== December ===
- December 1 – Charles Steen, geologist and businessman (died 2006)
- December 2 – Norma Miller, African-American dancer, choreographer, actress, author and comedian (died 2019)
- December 7 – Charles McGee, member of the Tuskegee Airmen, served as a USAF officer until 1973 (died 2022)
- December 8 – Lorraine H. Morton, politician (died 2018)
- December 9
  - Bert J. Harris Jr., politician (died 2019)
  - William Lipscomb, chemist, Nobel Prize laureate (died 2011)
- December 14 – Margie Stewart, model and actress (died 2012)
- December 15 – Max Yasgur, farmer (died 1973)
- December 21
  - Larry Eisenberg, writer (died 2018)
  - Tommy Byrne, baseball player (died 2007)
  - Doug Young, voice actor (died 2018)
- December 27 – Charles Sweeney, WWII pilot (died 2004)
- December 31 – Recy Taylor, activist (died 2017)

== Deaths ==
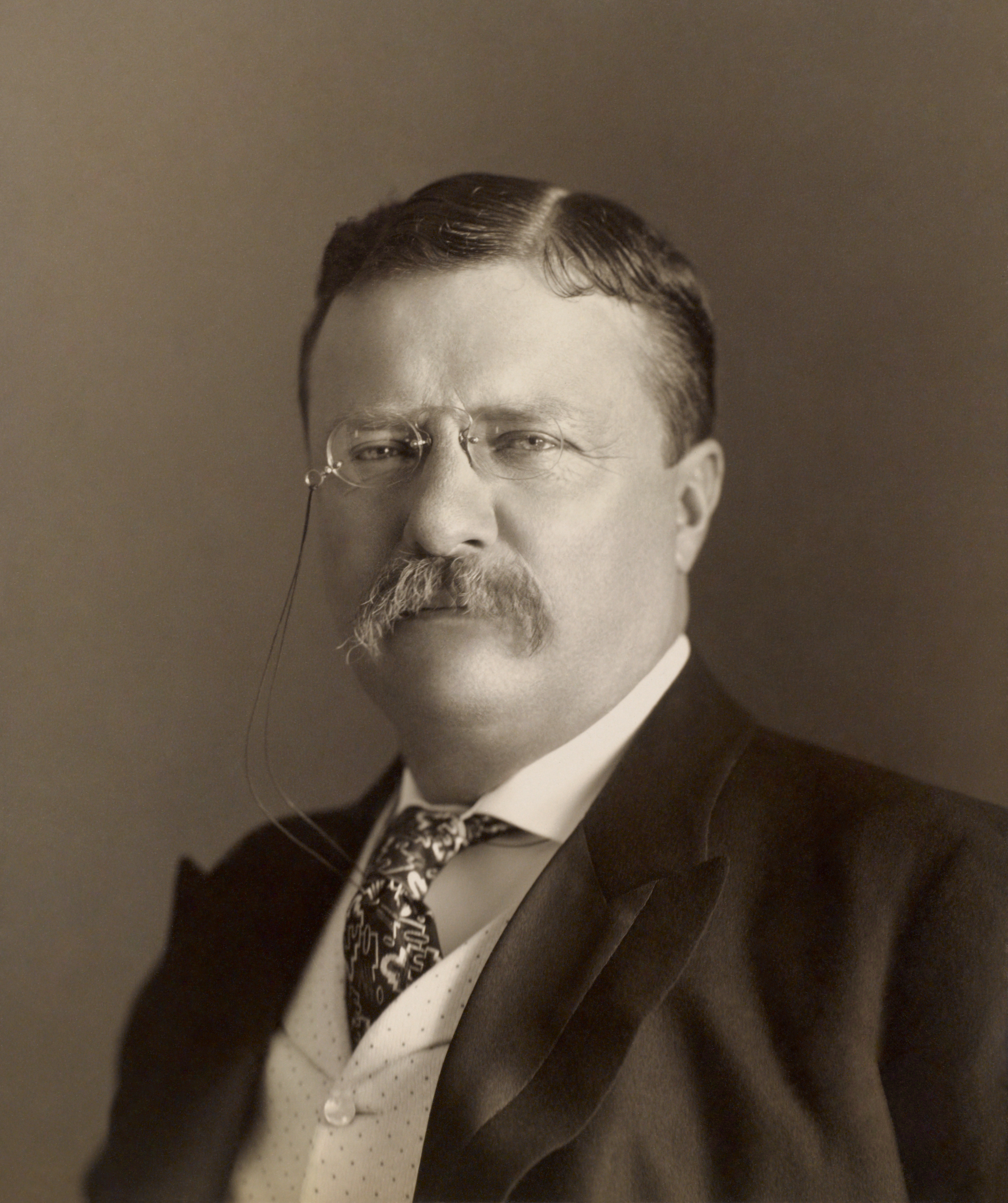
Theodore Roosevelt

- January 2 – Eliza Putnam Heaton, journalist and editor (born 1860)
- January 6
  - Max Heindel, Danish-American astrologer and mystic (born 1865)
  - Theodore Roosevelt, 26th president of the United States from 1901 to 1909, 25th vice president of the United States from March to September 1901 (born 1858)
- January 7 – Henry Ware Eliot, industrialist and philanthropist (born 1843)
- January 8 – Jim O'Rourke, baseball player and MLB Hall of Famer (born 1850)
- January 14 – Shelley Hull, stage & film actor, husband of Josephine Hull, brother of Henry Hull (born 1884)
- January 31 – Nat C. Goodwin, veteran stage star & silent film actor (born 1857; apoplexy)
- January 27 – French Ensor Chadwick, admiral (born 1844)
- February 18 – Henry Ragas, jazz pianist (born 1891)
- March 23 – Henry Blossom, lyricist (born 1866)
- April 8 – Frank Winfield Woolworth, businessman (born 1852)
- April 9
  - Sidney Drew, actor (born 1863)
  - James Reese Europe, jazz musician and composer, band leader (born 1881; stabbed in fight)
- April 15 – Jane Delano, nurse and founder or the American Red Cross Nursing Service (born 1862)
- May 6 – L. Frank Baum, author, poet, playwright, actor and independent filmmaker (The Wizard of Oz) (born 1856)
- May 14 – Henry John Heinz, businessman (born 1844)
- May 12 – D. M. Canright, Seventh-day Adventist minister and author, later one of the church's severest critics (born 1840)
- May 13 – Helen Hyde, etcher and engraver (born 1868)
- May 21 – Lamar Johnstone, silent film actor and director (born 1885)
- May 25 – Madam C. J. Walker, African American entrepreneur and philanthropist (born 1867)
- c. June 1 – Caroline Still Anderson, African American physician, educator and activist (born 1848)
- July 8 – John Fox Jr., journalist, novelist and short story writer (born 1862; pneumonia)
- August 1 – Oscar Hammerstein I, musical theatre impresario (born 1847)
- August 9 – Ralph Albert Blakelock, American painter (born 1847)
- August 11 – Andrew Carnegie, industrialist (born 1835 in Scotland)
- September 20 – Cy Seymour, baseball player (born 1872)
- September 27 – Gardner Dow, college football player (born 1898)
- October 30 – Ella Wheeler Wilcox, author and poet (born 1850)
- November 23 – Henry Gantt, project engineer (born 1861)
- November 24 – William Stowell, silent film actor and director (born 1885)
- December 2 – Henry C. Frick, industrialist (born 1849)
- December 7 – J. Thompson Baker, politician from New Jersey (born 1847)
- December 10 – William E. Miller soldier and Pennsylvania State Senator (born 1836)

== See also ==
- List of American films of 1919
- Timeline of United States history (1900–1929)
