= List of World War II aces credited with 5 victories =

Fighter aces in World War II had tremendously varying kill scores, affected as they were by many factors: the pilot's skill level, the performance of the airplane the pilot flew and the planes they flew against, how long they served, their opportunity to meet the enemy in the air (Allied to Axis disproportion), whether they were the formation's leader or a wingman, the standards their air service brought to the awarding of victory credits, et cetera.

== Aces ==
This background, along with the symbol "†", indicates that the pilot was killed in action, missing in action, died of wounds, or was killed in a flying accident during World War II.

Name	Country	Service(s)	Aerial victories	Other aerial victories	Notes
Norman J. Fortier	United States	U.S. Army Air Forces	5.83		(+5.5 ground kills)
Dean S. Laird	United States	U.S. Navy	5.75		
Walter J. Koraleski	United States	U.S. Army Air Forces	5.54		
Stanley Browne	New Zealand	Royal New Zealand Air Force	5.5		
Gordon B. Compton	United States	U.S. Army Air Forces	5.5		(+15 ground kills)
Jim Sheddan	New Zealand	Royal New Zealand Air Force	5.5		
Robert P. Winks	United States	U.S. Army Air Forces	5.5		
William Cundy	Australia	Royal Australian Air Force	5.5		
Charles W. Lenfest	United States	U.S. Army Air Forces	5.5		(+2 ground kills)
Leslie D. Minchew	United States	U.S. Army Air Forces	5.5		(+ 1/2 ground kills)
Laurence Stark	United Kingdom	Royal Air Force	5.5		
Kazimierz Rutkowski	Poland	Polish Air Force; Royal Air Force	5.5		
Stefan Witorzeńć	Poland	Polish Air Force; Royal Air Force	5.5		
Czesław Główczyński	Poland	Polish Air Force; Royal Air Force	5.5		
Michał Cwynar	Poland	Polish Air Force; Royal Air Force	5.5		
Mieczysław Mümler	Poland	Polish Air Force; Royal Air Force	5.5		
Bolesław Własnowolski	Poland	Polish Air Force; Royal Air Force	5.5		
James E. Duffy, Jr.	United States	U.S. Army Air Forces	5.2		(+9 ground kills)
Heinz-Günther Hans Adam	Germany	Luftwaffe	5		
Panagiotis Argyropoulos	Greece	Royal Hellenic Air Force	5		
Kurt Bohn	Germany	Luftwaffe	5		
Paul Bohn	Germany	Luftwaffe	5		
František Chábera	Czechoslovakia	Royal Air Force	5		
Philip Ensor †	United Kingdom	Royal Air Force	5		
Joseph Heim	Germany	Luftwaffe	5		Jet ace with all victories in Me 262
Lionel Gaunce †	Canada	Royal Air Force	5		(+1 shared destroyed)
William Hodgson †	New Zealand	Royal Air Force	5		
John Houlton	New Zealand	Royal New Zealand Air Force	5		(+2 shared destroyed)
Alfred Schreiber	Germany	Luftwaffe	5		Jet ace – first ever confirmed – with all victories in Me 262
Ulrich Steinhilper	Germany	Luftwaffe	5		
Tony Jonsson	Iceland	Royal Air Force	5		
Jean Offenberg †	Belgium	Belgian Air Force; Royal Air Force	5		(+2 shared destroyed)
Kenneth Tait †	New Zealand	Royal Air Force	5		plus a half share in one aircraft destroyed (with Ian Gleed)
Pentti Tilli	Finland	Finnish Air Force	5		
Robert W. Abernathy	United States	U.S. Army Air Forces	5		
Fred T. Ackerman	United States	U.S. Navy	5		
Oliver L. Adair	United States	U.S. Army Air Forces	5		
Robert H. Adams	United States	U.S. Army Air Forces	5		
John W. Agnew	United States	U.S. Army Air Forces	5		
William H. Allen	United States	U.S. Army Air Forces	5		
Stuart C. Alley Jr.	United States	U.S. Marine Corps	5		
Ernest J. Ambort	United States	U.S. Army Air Forces	5		
Robert H. Ammon	United States	U.S. Army Air Forces	5		(+9 ground kills)
Benjamin C. Amsden	United States	U.S. Navy	5		
Leslie E. Anderson	United States	U.S. Army Air Forces	5		
Richard H. Anderson	United States	U.S. Army Air Forces	5		
Lester L. Arasmith	United States	U.S. Army Air Forces	5		
William E. Aron	United States	U.S. Army Air Forces	5		
Richard W. Asbury	United States	U.S. Army Air Forces	5		
Abner M. Aust	United States	U.S. Army Air Forces	5		
Eugene D. Axtell	United States	U.S. Army Air Forces	5		
Donald A. Baccus	United States	U.S. Army Air Forces	5		
Jack A. Bade	United States	U.S. Army Air Forces	5		
Oscar C. Bailey	United States	U.S. Navy	5		
Raphael F. Baird	United States	U.S. Army Air Forces	5		
Donald L. Balch	United States	U.S. Marine Corps	5		
Raymond W. Bank	United States	U.S. Army Air Forces	5		
Bruce M. Barackman	United States	U.S. Navy	5		
Rex T. Barber	United States	U.S. Army Air Forces	5		
Robert M. Barkey	United States	U.S. Army Air Forces	5		
Truman S. Barnes	United States	U.S. Army Air Forces	5		
Albert Baumler	United States	U.S. Army Air Forces	5	+6 in Spanish Civil War	Ace in each of two wars
Aaron L. Bearden	United States	U.S. Army Air Forces	5		
Edward H. Beavers Jr.	United States	U.S. Army Air Forces	5		
József Bejczi †	Hungary	Royal Hungarian Air Force	5		
Louis Benne	United States	U.S. Army Air Forces	5		
Jack S. Berkheimer	United States	U.S. Navy	5		
Richard L. Bertelson	United States	U.S. Navy	5		
James D. Billo	United States	U.S. Navy	5		
Lewis S. Bishop	United States	American Volunteer Group	5		
Walter D. Bishop	United States	U.S. Navy	5		
Foster J. Blair	United States	U.S. Navy	5		
William K. Blair	United States	U.S. Navy	5		
Richard B. Blaydes	United States	U.S. Navy	5		
Ladislav Bobek	Czechoslovakia	Royal Air Force	5		
Victor E. Bocquin	United States	U.S. Army Air Forces	5		
John W. Bolyard	United States	U.S. Army Air Forces	5		
Robert R. Bonebrake	United States	U.S. Army Air Forces	5		
Robert R. Bonner Jr.	United States	U.S. Army Air Forces	5		
Guy P. Bordelon	United States	U.S. Navy	5		
Clarence A. Borley	United States	U.S. Navy	5		
Ernest O. Bostrom	United States	U.S. Army Air Forces	5		
Wilbur L. Bowen	United States	U.S. Army Air Forces	5		
Fred E. Bowker	United States	U.S. Army Air Forces	5		
John L. Bradley	United States	U.S. Army Air Forces	5		
Vintilă Brătianu	Kingdom of Romania	Royal Romanian Air Force	5		
Richard L. Braun	United States	U.S. Marine Corps	5		
Gerald A. Brown	United States	U.S. Army Air Forces	5		
Jasper R. Brown	United States	U.S. Army Air Forces	5		
Paul J. Bruneau	United States	U.S. Navy	5		
Robert L. Buchanan	United States	U.S. Navy	5		
Robert Bungey	Australia	Royal Air Force	5		
Nicolae Burileanu	Kingdom of Romania	Royal Romanian Air Force	5		
Robert G. Burns	United States	U.S. Army Air Forces	5		
Robert L. Byrnes	United States	U.S. Army Air Forces	5		
John B. Carder	United States	U.S. Army Air Forces	5		
William A. Carlton	United States	U.S. Marine Corps	5		
Nial K. Castle	United States	U.S. Army Air Forces	5		
Laurențiu Catană	Kingdom of Romania	Royal Romanian Air Force	5		
Henry K. Champion	United States	U.S. Navy	5		
George T. Chandler	United States	U.S. Army Air Forces	5		
Van E. Chandler	United States	U.S. Army Air Forces	5	+3 in Korean War	
Joseph J. Cielinski	United States	U.S. Army Air Forces	5		
Arthur B. Cleaveland	United States	U.S. Army Air Forces	5		
Donald C. Clements	United States	U.S. Navy	5		
Robert E. Clements	United States	U.S. Navy	5		
Dallas A. Clinger	United States	U.S. Army Air Forces	5		
Vivian A. Cloud	United States	U.S. Army Air Forces	5		
Paul R. Cochran	United States	U.S. Army Air Forces	5		
William F. Collins	United States	U.S. Army Air Forces	5		
Basil Collyns †	New Zealand	Royal New Zealand Air Force	5		
Philip E. Colman	United States	U.S. Army Air Forces	5	+4 in Korean War	
Harold E. Comstock	United States	U.S. Army Air Forces	5		
Harry L. Condon	United States	U.S. Army Air Forces	5		
Merle M. Coons	United States	U.S. Army Air Forces	5		
Petre Cordescu	Kingdom of Romania	Royal Romanian Air Force	5		
Leland B. Cornell	United States	U.S. Navy	5		
Ralph L. Cox	United States	U.S. Army Air Forces	5		
Niven K. Cranfill	United States	U.S. Army Air Forces	5		
Gheorghe Cristea	Kingdom of Romania	Royal Romanian Air Force	5		
William S. Crombie	United States	U.S. Army Air Forces	5		
John O. Cross	United States	U.S. Army Air Forces	5		
Omer W. Culbertson	United States	U.S. Army Air Forces	5		
William J. Cullerton	United States	U.S. Army Air Forces	5		(+15 ground kills, plus 9 damaged)
Arthur C. Cundy	United States	U.S. Army Air Forces	5		
Warren D. Curton	United States	U.S. Army Air Forces	5		
Evžen Čížek †	Czechoslovakia	Royal Air Force	5		
Roald Dahl	United Kingdom	Royal Air Force	5		
William A. Daniel	United States	U.S. Army Air Forces	5		
Clarence E. Davies	United States	U.S. Navy	5		
Leonard K. Davis	United States	U.S. Marine Corps	5		
George E. Dawkins Jr.	United States	U.S. Marine Corps	5		
William C. Day Jr.	United States	U.S. Army Air Forces	5		
Richard S. Deakins	United States	U.S. Army Air Forces	5		
George Della	United States	U.S. Army Air Forces	5		
Reuben H. Denoff	United States	U.S. Navy	5		
Frederick E. Dick	United States	U.S. Army Air Forces	5		
Michael Dikovitsky	United States	U.S. Army Air Forces	5		
Antonio Dini †	New Zealand	Royal Air Force	5		
I.B. Donalson	United States	U.S. Army Air Forces	5		
Harry W. Dorris	United States	U.S. Army Air Forces	5		
Cecil J. Doyle	United States	U.S. Marine Corps	5		
Charles W. Drake	United States	U.S. Marine Corps	5		
Daniel B. Driscoll	United States	U.S. Navy	5		
Willie Driscoll	United States	U.S. Navy	5		
Francis E. Dubisher	United States	U.S. Army Air Forces	5		
Charles H. Dubois	United States	U.S. Army Air Forces	5		
James E. Duffy	United States	U.S. Navy	5		
Richard E. Duffy	United States	U.S. Army Air Forces	5		
Mircea Dumitrescu	Kingdom of Romania	Royal Romanian Air Force	5		
Hariton Dusescu	Kingdom of Romania	Royal Romanian Air Force	5		
Joseph L. Egen Jr.	United States	U.S. Army Air Forces	5		
Hugh M. Elwood	United States	U.S. Marine Corps	5		
James W. Empey	United States	U.S. Army Air Forces	5		
Lyle A. Erickson	United States	U.S. Navy	5		
Herman E. Ernst	United States	U.S. Army Air Forces	5		
Charles D. Farmer	United States	U.S. Navy	5		
Robert A. Farnsworth Jr.	United States	U.S. Navy	5		
William Farrell	United States	U.S. Marine Corps	5		
Richard D. Faxon	United States	U.S. Army Air Forces	5		
Marion C. Felts	United States	U.S. Army Air Forces	5		
James E. Fenex Jr.	United States	U.S. Army Air Forces	5		
William Fiedler	United States	U.S. Army Air Forces	5		
Virgil C. Fields Jr.	United States	U.S. Army Air Forces	5		
Howard J. Finn	United States	U.S. Marine Corps	5		
Charles R. Fischette	United States	U.S. Army Air Forces	5		
Harry E. Fisk	United States	U.S. Army Air Forces	5		
Nelson D. Flack Jr.	United States	U.S. Army Air Forces	5		
Kenneth A. Flinn	United States	U.S. Navy	5		
Ralph E. Foltz	United States	U.S. Navy	5		
Paul J. Fontana	United States	U.S. Marine Corps	5		
Claude E. Ford	United States	U.S. Army Air Forces	5		
Kenneth M. Ford	United States	U.S. Marine Corps	5		
George Formanek Jr.	United States	U.S. Navy	5		
Béla Füleky †	Hungary	Royal Hungarian Air Force	5		
Bohumil Fürst-Fiřt	Czechoslovakia	Royal Air Force	5		
Dwight B. Galt	United States	U.S. Navy	5		
Warner F. Gardner	United States	U.S. Army Air Forces	5		
Noel Gayler	United States	U.S. Navy	5		
Steven N. Gerick	United States	U.S. Army Air Forces	5		
Grover D. Ghelson	United States	U.S. Army Air Forces	5		
Robert D. Gibb	United States	U.S. Army Air Forces	5		
Cyrus R. Gladen	United States	U.S. Army Air Forces	5		
Lindley W. Godson	United States	U.S. Navy	5		
Norman D. Gould	United States	U.S. Army Air Forces	5		
Giorgio Graffer	Kingdom of Italy	Regia Aeronautica	5		
Robert F. Graham	United States	U.S. Army Air Forces	5		
Vernon E. Graham	United States	U.S. Navy	5		Ace in a day
Hayden A. "Buck" Gregory	United States	U.S. Navy	5		
Robert C. Griffith	United States	U.S. Army Air Forces	5		
William Grosvenor Jr.	United States	U.S. Army Air Forces	5		
Lindsay W. Grove	United States	U.S. Army Air Forces	5		
Cheatham W. Gupton	United States	U.S. Army Air Forces	5		
Albert E. Hacking	United States	U.S. Marine Corps	5		
Samuel E. Hammer	United States	U.S. Army Air Forces	5		
Harry T. Hanna	United States	U.S. Army Air Forces	5		Ace in a day
Christopher J. Hansenman	United States	U.S. Army Air Forces	5		
Josef G. Hanuš	Czechoslovakia	Royal Air Force	5		
Walter R. Harman	United States	U.S. Navy	5		
Thomas L. Harris	United States	U.S. Army Air Forces	5		
Raymond E. Hartley	United States	U.S. Army Air Forces	5		
Herbert B. Hatch	United States	U.S. Army Air Forces	5		
Charles D. Hauver	United States	U.S. Army Air Forces	5		
Sándor Hautzinger	Hungary	Royal Hungarian Air Force	5		
Russell C. Haworth	United States	U.S. Army Air Forces	5		
Frank R. Hayde	United States	U.S. Navy	5		
James Hayter	New Zealand	Royal Air Force	5		(+1 probable)
Frank C. Hearrell	United States	U.S. Navy	5		
Charles F. Held Jr.	United States	U.S. Army Air Forces	5		
Paul M. Henderson Jr.	United States	U.S. Navy	5		
Randall W. Hendricks	United States	U.S. Army Air Forces	5		
James E. Hill	United States	U.S. Army Air Forces	5		
Richard Hope Hillary	Australia	Royal Air Force	5		(+2 probables)
Donald E. Hillman	United States	U.S. Army Air Forces	5		
Kenneth G. Hippe	United States	U.S. Navy	5		
Edwin M. Hiro	United States	U.S. Army Air Forces	5		
Myron M. Hnatio	United States	U.S. Army Air Forces	5		
John B. Hoag	United States	U.S. Navy	5		
William R. Hodges	United States	U.S. Army Air Forces	5		
Cullen J. Hoffman	United States	U.S. Army Air Forces	5		
Louis Hoffman	United States	American Volunteer Group	5		
Herbert N. Houck	United States	U.S. Navy	5		
Edward R. Hoyt	United States	U.S. Army Air Forces	5		
Mark E. Hubbard	United States	U.S. Army Air Forces	5		
Howard R. Hudson	United States	U.S. Navy	5		
Alvaro J. Hunter	United States	U.S. Army Air Forces	5		
András Huszár	Hungary	Royal Hungarian Air Force	5		
Reginald Jack Hyde	New Zealand	Royal Air Force	5		(+1 probable)
Joseph W. Icard	United States	U.S. Army Air Forces	5		
Julius W. Ireland	United States	U.S. Marine Corps	5		
Clayton M. Isaacson	United States	U.S. Army Air Forces	5		
Leslie Douglas Jackson	Australia	Royal Australian Air Force	5		
Svatopluk Janouch	Czechoslovakia	Royal Air Force	5		
Hayden M. Jensen	United States	U.S. Navy	5		
Evan M. Johnson	United States	U.S. Army Air Forces	5		
Wallace R. Johnson	United States	U.S. Navy	5		
Curran L. Jones	United States	U.S. Army Air Forces	5		
Frank C. Jones	United States	U.S. Army Air Forces	5		(+ 5.5 ground kills)
Lynn F. Jones	United States	U.S. Army Air Forces	5		
Warren L. Jones	United States	U.S. Army Air Forces	5		
Joseph W. Jorda	United States	U.S. Army Air Forces	5		
Ivon Julian	New Zealand	Royal New Zealand Air Force	5		(+2 probable)
William M. Julian	United States	U.S. Army Air Forces	5		
Charles Kendrick	United States	U.S. Marine Corps	5		
Daniel Kennedy	United States	U.S. Army Air Forces	5		
Robert H. Kidwell	United States	U.S. Navy	5		
Melvin B. Kimball	United States	U.S. Army Air Forces	5		
John R. Kincaid	United States	U.S. Navy	5		
Charles W. King	United States	U.S. Army Air Forces	5		
David L. King	United States	U.S. Army Air Forces	5		
Marion F. Kirby	United States	U.S. Army Air Forces	5		
Lenton F. Kirkland	United States	U.S. Army Air Forces	5		
Ernő Kiss	Hungary	Royal Hungarian Air Force	5		
Jan Klán	Czechoslovakia	Royal Air Force	5		
Robert H. Knapp	United States	U.S. Army Air Forces	5		
Carroll S. Knott	United States	U.S. Army Air Forces	5		
Teruhiko Kobayashi	Japan	Imperial Japanese Army	5		
Edward H. Kopsel	United States	U.S. Army Air Forces	5		
William J. Kostic	United States	U.S. Navy	5		
Bedřich Krátkoruký †	Czechoslovakia	Royal Air Force	5		
Jiří V. Kučera	Czechoslovakia	Royal Air Force	5		
Wayne W. Laird	United States	U.S. Marine Corps	5		
William E. Lamoreaux	United States	U.S. Navy	5		
Richard C. Lampe	United States	U.S. Army Air Forces	5		
Willis Laney	United States	U.S. Navy	5		
Ned W. Langdon	United States	U.S. Navy	5		
Thomas G. Lanphier	United States	U.S. Army Air Forces	5		
Franklin C. Lathrope	United States	U.S. Army Air Forces	5		
Charles H. Laughlin	United States	American Volunteer Group	5		
George Laven	United States	U.S. Army Air Forces	5		
Earl R. Lazear	United States	U.S. Army Air Forces	5		
Harold K. Lee	United States	U.S. Army Air Forces	5		
Richard J. Lee	United States	U.S. Army Air Forces	5		
Marlow J. Leikness	United States	U.S. Army Air Forces	5		
Charles W. Lenfest	United States	U.S. Army Air Forces	5		
Jack Lenox Jr.	United States	U.S. Army Air Forces	5		
John A. Leppla	United States	U.S. Navy	5		
Alfred B. Lewelling	United States	U.S. Army Air Forces	5		
Frank Liesendahl	Germany	Luftwaffe	5~		
Brooks J. Liles	United States	U.S. Army Air Forces	5	+4 in Korean War	
Hugh D. Lillie	United States	U.S. Navy	5		
James W. Little	United States	U.S. Army Air Forces	5	+1 in Korean War	
John Lolos	Greece	U.S. Army Air Forces	5		
Charles P. London	United States	U.S. Army Air Forces	5		
Donald Lopez	United States	U.S. Army Air Forces	5		
George G. Loving, Jr.	United States	U.S. Army Air Forces	5		
John F. Luma	United States	U.S. Army Air Forces	5		
Lowell C. Lutton	United States	U.S. Army Air Forces	5		
John A. Mackay	United States	U.S. Army Air Forces	5		
Morton D. Magoffin	United States	U.S. Army Air Forces	5		
Keith Mahon	United States	U.S. Army Air Forces	5		
Jackson C. Mankin	United States	U.S. Army Air Forces	5		
Lee P. Mankin	United States	U.S. Navy	5		
Harry A. March Jr.	United States	U.S. Navy	5		
Luigi Mariotti	Kingdom of Italy	Regia Aeronautica	5		
Lester C. Marsh	United States	U.S. Army Air Forces	5		
Albert E. Martin Jr.	United States	U.S. Navy	5		
Kenneth R. Martin	United States	U.S. Army Air Forces	5		
Joseph L. Mason	United States	U.S. Army Air Forces	5		
William H. Mathis	United States	U.S. Army Air Forces	5		
Joseph Z. Matte	United States	U.S. Army Air Forces	5		
Chester K. Maxwell	United States	U.S. Army Air Forces	5		
Benjamin I. Mayo	United States	U.S. Army Air Forces	5		
Paul G. McArthur	United States	U.S. Army Air Forces	5		
Henry A. McCartney Jr.	United States	U.S. Marine Corps	5		
Leo B. McCudden	United States	U.S. Navy	5		
William F. McDownough	United States	U.S. Army Air Forces	5		
James N. McElroy	United States	U.S. Army Air Forces	5		(+6 ground kills)
John L. McGinn	United States	U.S. Army Air Forces	5		
Selva E. McGinty	United States	U.S. Marine Corps	5		
Samuel E. McGuffin	United States	U.S. Army Air Forces	5		
John W. McGuyrt	United States	U.S. Army Air Forces	5		
Donald J. McKinley	United States	U.S. Navy	5		
George. McMillan	United States	American Volunteer Group	5		
Evan D. MacMinn	United States	U.S. Army Air Forces	5		
Ernest McNab	Canada	Royal Canadian Air Force	5		
Donald M. McPherson	United States	U.S. Navy	5		
George L. Merritt Jr.	United States	U.S. Army Air Forces	5		(+6 ground kills)
Frederick H. Michaelis	United States	U.S. Navy	5		
Everett Miller	United States	U.S. Army Air Forces	5		
Joseph E. Miller	United States	U.S. Army Air Forces	5		
Robert C. Milliken	United States	U.S. Army Air Forces	5		
Charles Milton	United States	U.S. Navy	5		
Marinos Mitralexis	Greece	Royal Hellenic Air Force	5		
Arthur P. Mollenhauer	United States	U.S. Navy	5		
Franklin H. Monk	United States	U.S. Army Air Forces	5		
Robert H. Moore	United States	U.S. Army Air Forces	5		
Paul V. Morriss	United States	U.S. Army Air Forces	5		
Arthur H. Munson	United States	U.S. Navy	5		
Jennings S. Myers	United States	U.S. Army Air Forces	5		
Raymond B. Myers	United States	U.S. Army Air Forces	5		(+4 ground kills)
Joseph R. Myshrall	United States	U.S. Army Air Forces	5		
Leslie D. Nelson	United States	U.S. Army Air Forces	5		
Robert J. Nelson	United States	U.S. Navy	5		
Franklin A. Nichols	United States	U.S. Army Air Forces	5		
Constantin Nicoară	Kingdom of Romania	Royal Romanian Air Force	5		
Edward M. Nollmeyer	United States	U.S. Army Air Forces	5		
Harold North †	New Zealand	Royal Air Force	5		
Marvin R. Novak	United States	U.S. Navy	5		
Jack G. Oberhansky	United States	U.S. Army Air Forces	5		
Frank O'Brien Jr.	United States	U.S. Army Air Forces	5		
Edwin L. Olander	United States	U.S. Marine Corps	5		
Austin L. Olsen	United States	U.S. Navy	5		
Paul E. Olson	United States	U.S. Army Air Forces	5		
Enzo Omiccioli	Kingdom of Italy	Regia Aeronautica	5		
Eugene W. O'Neill Jr.	United States	U.S. Army Air Forces	5		
Lawrence F. O'Neill	United States	U.S. Army Air Forces	5		347th FG, 342nd Fighter Squadron, PTO
Ernest K. Osher	United States	U.S. Army Air Forces	5		
Robert J. Overcash	United States	U.S. Army Air Forces	5		
Edward W. Overton Jr.	United States	U.S. Navy	5		
Joel A. Owens	United States	U.S. Army Air Forces	5		
Melvyn R. Paisley	United States	U.S. Army Air Forces	5		
Tibor Papp	Hungary	Royal Hungarian Air Force	5		
Forrest F. Parham	United States	U.S. Army Air Forces	5		
Edsel Paulk	United States	U.S. Army Air Forces	5		
Oscar F. Perdomo	United States	U.S. Army Air Forces	5		Ace in a day
John Petach	United States	American Volunteer Group	5		
Costantino Petrosellini	Kingdom of Italy	Regia Aeronautica	5		(+3 Ju-52 destroyed on ground)
David P. Philips III	United States	U.S. Navy	5		
Edward A. Phillips	United States	U.S. Navy	5		
Hyde Phillips	United States	U.S. Marine Corps	5		
Kenneth R. Pool	United States	U.S. Army Air Forces	5		
Edward S. Popek	United States	U.S. Army Air Forces	5		
Constantin Popescu	Kingdom of Romania	Royal Romanian Air Force	5		
Robert B. Porter	United States	U.S. Marine Corps	5		
George H. Poske	United States	U.S. Marine Corps	5		
Ernest A. Powell	United States	U.S. Marine Corps	5		
MacArthur Powers	United States	U.S. Army Air Forces	5		
Jack C. Price	United States	U.S. Army Air Forces	5		
Royce W. Priest	United States	U.S. Army Air Forces	5		
Walter Prues †	Germany	Luftwaffe	5		Night fighter ace
Roger C. Pryor	United States	U.S. Army Air Forces	5		
Josef Příhoda †	Czechoslovakia	Royal Air Force	5		
Rajmund Půda	Czechoslovakia	Royal Air Force	5		
Donald L. Quigley	United States	U.S. Army Air Forces	5		
Robert J. Raines	United States	American Volunteer Group; U.S. Army Air Forces	5		victories with 2 air forces
Orvin H. Ramlo	United States	U.S. Marine Corps	5		
William C. Reese	United States	U.S. Army Air Forces	5		
Joseph E. Reulet	United States	U.S. Navy	5		
Thomas W. Rhodes	United States	U.S. Navy	5		
Vincent A. Rieger	United States	U.S. Navy	5		
Andrew Ritchey	United States	U.S. Army Air Forces	5		
Newell O. Roberts	United States	U.S. Army Air Forces	5		
Leroy W. Robinson	United States	U.S. Navy	5		
Ross F. Robinson	United States	U.S. Navy	5		
Franklin Rose	United States	U.S. Army Air Forces	5		
János Róza	Hungary	Royal Hungarian Air Force	5		
Gerald L. Rounds	United States	U.S. Army Air Forces	5		
Henry S. Rudolph	United States	U.S. Army Air Forces	5		
Michael T. Russo	United States	U.S. Army Air Forces	5		Only A-36 ace in history
William A. Rynne	United States	U.S. Army Air Forces	5		
Hartwell V. Scarborough	United States	U.S. Marine Corps	5		
Thomas D. Schank	United States	U.S. Army Air Forces	5		
Gordon E. Schecter	United States	U.S. Navy	5		
John L. Schell	United States	U.S. Navy	5		
Raymond Scherer	United States	U.S. Marine Corps	5		
James F. Schilke	United States	U.S. Army Air Forces	5		
Louis Schriber	United States	U.S. Army Air Forces	5		
Duerr H. Schuh	United States	U.S. Army Air Forces	5		
Robert B. Schultz	United States	U.S. Army Air Forces	5		
Desmond J. Scott	New Zealand	Royal Air Force; Royal New Zealand Air Force	5		(+6 probables)
Harry H. Sealey	United States	U.S. Army Air Forces	5		
Alexander F. Sears	United States	U.S. Army Air Forces	5		
Robert B. See	United States	U.S. Marine Corps	5		
Carlo Seganti	Kingdom of Italy	Regia Aeronautica	5		
Robert K. Seidman	United States	U.S. Army Air Forces	5		
Erich Selei	Kingdom of Romania	Royal Romanian Air Force	5		
Desmond Sheen	Australia	Royal Air Force	5		
Charles A. Shields	United States	U.S. Navy	5		
Lester H. Sipes	United States	U.S. Navy	5		
Frank Sistrunk	United States	U.S. Navy	5		
Jack R. Smith	United States	U.S. Army Air Forces	5		
Kenneth B. Smith	United States	U.S. Army Air Forces	5		
Kenneth D. Smith	United States	U.S. Navy	5		
Virgil H. Smith	United States	U.S. Army Air Forces	5		
Irl V. Sonner Jr.	United States	U.S. Navy	5		
James J. Southerland	United States	U.S. Navy	5		
Arthur Spurgin	Australia	Royal Australian Air Force	5		
Clyde P. Spitler	United States	U.S. Navy	5		
William J. Stangel	United States	U.S. Army Air Forces	5		
Morris A. Stanley	United States	U.S. Army Air Forces	5		
Edgar E. Stebbins	United States	U.S. Navy	5		
Edward J. Stefanski	United States	U.S. Army Air Forces	5		
Raymond D. Stehle	United States	U.S. Army Air Forces	5		
Kenneth Stewart	New Zealand	Royal New Zealand Air Force	5		
Carl V. Stone	United States	U.S. Navy	5		
Johnnie C. Strange	United States	U.S. Navy	5		
Richard C. Suehr	United States	U.S. Army Air Forces	5		
Charles P. Sullivan	United States	U.S. Army Air Forces	5		
Robert C. Sutcliffe	United States	U.S. Army Air Forces	5		
John F. Sutherland	United States	U.S. Navy	5		
Ladislav Světlík	Czechoslovakia	Royal Air Force	5		
John F. Swinburne Jr.	United States	U.S. Navy	5		
William J. Sykes	United States	U.S. Army Air Forces	5		(+5 ground kills)
Stanley Synar	United States	U.S. Marine Corps	5		
Oliver B. Taylor	United States	U.S. Army Air Forces	5		
William W. Taylor	United States	U.S. Navy	5		
Keith Taylor-Cannon †	New Zealand	Royal New Zealand Air Force	5		
Robert D. Thompson	United States	U.S. Army Air Forces	5		
Aurel Tifrea	Kingdom of Romania	Royal Romanian Air Force	5		
John A. Tilley	United States	U.S. Army Air Forces	5		
Edward W. Toaspern	United States	U.S. Navy	5		
John W. Topliff	United States	U.S. Navy	5		
Harrison B. Tordoff	United States	U.S. Army Air Forces	5		
Ross E. Torkelson	United States	U.S. Navy	5		
Eugene P. Townsend	United States	U.S. Navy	5		
Clifton H. Troxell	United States	U.S. Army Air Forces	5		
Peter J. Van Der Linden	United States	U.S. Navy	5		
Rudolph D. Van Dyke	United States	U.S. Navy	5		
Robert H. Vaught Jr.	United States	U.S. Army Air Forces	5		
John E. Vogt	United States	U.S. Army Air Forces	5		
Horace Q. Waggoner	United States	U.S. Army Air Forces	5		(+7.5 ground kills)
Walter B. Walker Jr.	United States	U.S. Army Air Forces	5		
Lyttleton T. Ward	United States	U.S. Navy	5		
Jack R. Warren	United States	U.S. Army Air Forces	5		
Ralph J. Watson	United States	U.S. Army Air Forces	5		
Sidney W. Wheatherford	United States	U.S. Army Air Forces	5		
Willard J. Webb	United States	U.S. Army Air Forces	5		
Gregory J. Weissenberger	United States	U.S. Marine Corps	5		
Darrell G. Welch	United States	U.S. Army Air Forces	5		
Albert P. Welles	United States	U.S. Marine Corps	5		
Robert G. West	United States	U.S. Navy	5		
Harry S. White	United States	U.S. Navy	5		
John H. White	United States	U.S. Army Air Forces	5		
David C. Wilhelm	United States	U.S. Army Air Forces	5		
Paul H. Wilkins	United States	U.S. Army Air Forces	5		
William F. Wilson	United States	U.S. Army Air Forces	5		
Russell D. Williams	United States	U.S. Army Air Forces	5		
Robert A. Winston	United States	U.S. Navy	5		
Ralph L. Wire	United States	U.S. Army Air Forces	5		
Lee V. Wiseman	United States	U.S. Army Air Forces	5		
John L. Wolford	United States	U.S. Army Air Forces	5		
George L. Wrenn	United States	U.S. Navy	5		
Max J. Wright	United States	U.S. Army Air Forces	5		
Vasseure F. Wynn	United States	Royal Air Force; U.S. Army Air Forces	5		victories with 2 air forces
Robert R. Yaeger Jr.	United States	U.S. Army Air Forces	5		
Robert M. York	United States	U.S. Army Air Forces	5		
Michael R. Yunck	United States	U.S. Marine Corps	5		
