= Mary Hawkins =

Mary Hawkins may refer to:

- Mary Elizabeth Hawkins (1875–1950), Canadian charity worker who founded Canada's first birth control clinic
- Mary Ann Hawkins (1919–1993), American surfing pioneer
- Mary Louise Hawkins (1921–2007), American nurse who received the Distinguished Flying Cross
- Mary Ellen Hawkins (1923–2023), American politician, member of the Florida House of Representatives
