= Elizabeth Bagshaw =

Canadian doctor (1881–1982)

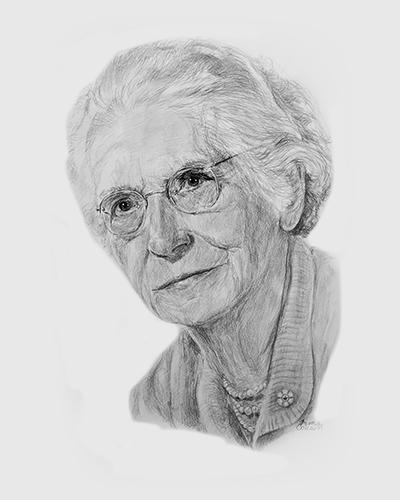
- Elizabeth Bagshaw in later life
- Born: Elizabeth Catherine Bagshaw; 19 October 1881; Mariposa, Ontario, Canada
- Died: January 5, 1982 (aged 100); Hamilton, Ontario, Canada
- Education: University of Toronto (MD, 1905)
- Occupation: Physician
- Known for: Medical director of Canada's first birth control clinic
- Awards: Order of Canada; Governor General's Awards in Commemoration of the Persons Case; Canadian Medical Hall of Fame
- Medical career
- Field: Obstetrics and women's health
- Institutions: Hamilton Birth Control Clinic

Elizabeth Catherine Bagshaw CM (October 19, 1881 – January 5, 1982) was one of Canada's first woman physicians. She was the medical director of the first birth control clinic in Canada, located in Hamilton, Ontario.

== Early life ==
Bagshaw was born on a farm in Mariposa, Ontario, the youngest of four daughters of John and Eliza Bagshaw. Bagshaw's sister, Annie, remarked that from a young age she had a brilliant memory, and school work came easily for her. Her father died in July 1904 in a farm accident, which left Bagshaw in charge of the family farm which spanned 89 hectares. By the first week of October 1904, Bagshaw sold the farm, and moved both her mother and a sister with her to Toronto to finish her final year of medical school.

== Education ==
Bagshaw registered at the University of Toronto in September 1901 as an occasional student; this enabled her to obtain a degree from this university while taking most of her courses at the neighbouring Ontario Medical College for Women, which would later become Women's College Hospital. Here she gained practical experience seeing prenatal patients at a maternity clinic. In 1905 Elizabeth became Doctor Bagshaw and graduated from the University of Toronto. After graduation, Bagshaw apprenticed under Emma Leila Skinner who was an 1896 graduate of the University of Toronto. There she learned of maternity work, and the economic struggles patients often had in affording and seeing a doctor.

== Career ==
After working in Hamilton, Ontario for the summer of 1906, Bagshaw moved to that city and set up her own medical practice. During the Spanish flu epidemic, Bagshaw had approximately 25–30 maternity cases per month.

In 1934, Bagshaw entered politics, seeking to fill the Ward 1 aldermanic seat being vacated by Nora-Frances Henderson, one of Hamilton's first elected female local politicians who sought election to the city's Board of Control. Despite a strong campaign, Bagshaw placed third, a loss the Hamilton Spectator attributed to her running against the area's long-serving school trustee, Orville Walsh.

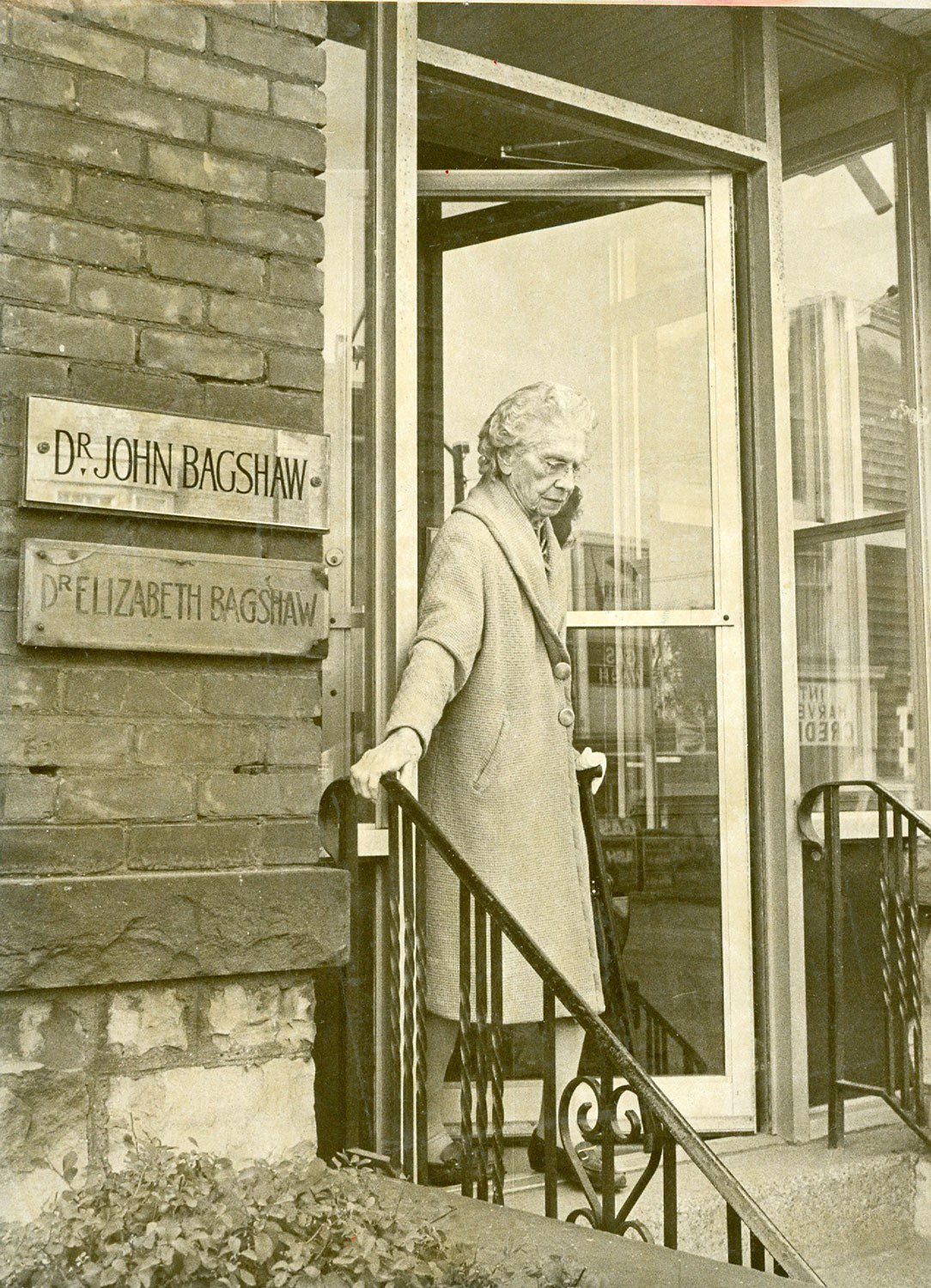

=== Birth control work in Hamilton ===
In 1932, Bagshaw became medical director of a birth control clinic in Hamilton, Ontario, a position she would hold for more than three decades. The clinic, opened on 3 March 1932 and widely regarded as the first birth-control clinic in Canada, had been organized by the Hamilton Birth Control League under the leadership of local social reformer Mary Elizabeth Hawkins.

Bagshaw assumed the role shortly after the clinic opened. The first physician appointed as medical director resigned after only three weeks, after which Hawkins approached Bagshaw to take over the clinic's medical work. At the time Bagshaw was practicing medicine in Hamilton and treating many working-class families. She accepted the position and became responsible for the clinic’s consultations and medical guidance.

When Bagshaw began directing the clinic, the provision of contraceptive information remained restricted under the Canadian Criminal Code, which prohibited the sale, advertisement, and distribution of contraceptive devices unless it could be justified as serving the public good. The clinic provided consultations and "advice on family limitation" to women who otherwise had little access to reliable medical guidance about contraception. Despite these legal constraints and the social controversy surrounding contraception, work Bagshaw later described as "doing the devil's work", she continued to provide consultations on family limitation and maternal health.

The clinic quickly attracted patients. By the end of its first year of operation nearly 400 women had sought advice there. Some local clerics and traditionalists denounced birth control as "a dirty thing", reflecting the moral opposition the clinic faced. Over the following decades Bagshaw treated thousands of patients and ultimately became one of the most prominent physicians associated with the early birth-control movement in Canada. Her work included attending patients in difficult circumstances, including delivering a child by the light of kerosene lamps in her car.

Bagshaw remained medical director of the Hamilton clinic until the mid-1960s. The clinic she directed for more than thirty years became one of the longest continuously operating birth-control clinics in Canada. She retired at the age of 95 in 1976, the oldest practicing physician in Canada at the time.

== Personal life ==
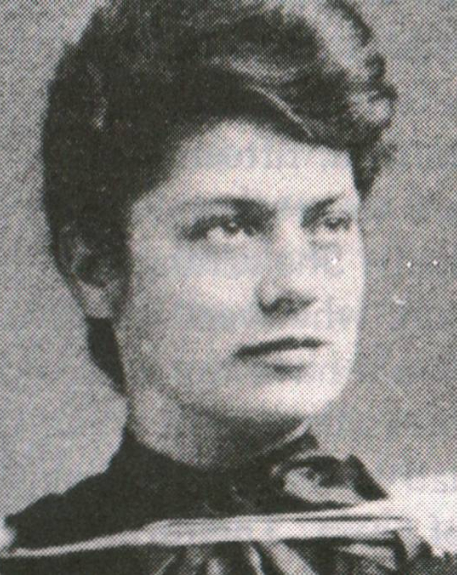
Elizabeth Bagshaw in her graduation robes after completing her medical training at the University of Toronto, 1905.

Shortly before World War I, Bagshaw met Lou Honey, a Canadian soldier, who was killed shortly after enlisting in 1915. She also corresponded with a man named Jimmie Dickinson while at the University of Toronto and kept in touch with him for years after their graduation in 1905. At the time of the Spanish flu epidemic he was living in Western Canada, contracted Spanish flu, developed pneumonia and died. In 1921, nearing her 40th birthday, Bagshaw began a friendship with Rocco Perri, a man known as the king of bootleggers.

Bagshaw attended church her whole life and belonged to a temperance organization; however, she had a tendency to become involved with law-breakers. During this same period, in February 1926, she received a phone call telling her that her second cousin, Bernice, was ill. When Bernice died, Bagshaw cared for her son, John. At the age of 45 she adopted him, calling her lawyer and avoiding Children's Aid completely, reasoning that "they would never give a child to an unmarried woman." Both her son, and her daughter-in-law would eventually become doctors and work in the same office she started in Hamilton.

Dr. Bagshaw was an avid golfer, and a charter member of Glendale Golf & Country Club when it was founded in 1919. Dr. Bagshaw's son John, in a note to the golf club, said that he had only seen his mother cry twice in her life. The first time was when her beloved Glendale's original clubhouse burned to the ground in 1936.

She became a centenarian in 1981.

== Awards and distinctions ==
=== National honours ===
- Member of the Order of Canada, 1973. Bagshaw was invested on 11 April 1973 in recognition of her long career as a physician and her pioneering work providing birth control services to women in Canada.
- Governor General's Awards in Commemoration of the Persons Case, 1979. Bagshaw was one of the first seven recipients of this award, created to honour people who had made important contributions to improving the lives and equality of women in Canada.

=== Civic recognition ===
- Hamilton Citizen of the Year, 1970. The award recognized Bagshaw's many years of medical service to the community of Hamilton, Ontario, including her work providing reproductive health care to women who had few other options.

=== Cultural recognition ===
- Doctor Woman: The Life and Times of Dr. Elizabeth Bagshaw, 1978. The National Film Board of Canada produced this documentary film about her life and medical career, focusing on her work at Canada's first birth control clinic.

=== Professional recognition ===
- Inducted into the Canadian Medical Hall of Fame, 2007, in recognition of her pioneering work in reproductive health care.

=== Commemorations and namesakes ===
- Elizabeth Bagshaw Elementary School in Hamilton, Ontario, named in her honour.
- Elizabeth Bagshaw Women's Clinic in Vancouver, British Columbia, a reproductive health clinic named to recognize her early work providing contraception and family planning services.
