= Baltimore Mine Tunnel disaster =

Historic coal mining accident

Coordinates: 41.245°N 75.861°W

- Date: June 5, 1919
- Location: Wilkes-Barre, Pennsylvania
- Type: Mining accident
- Cause: Explosion caused by ignition of blasting powder
- Participants: Delaware and Hudson
- Deaths: 92 miners
- Injuries: 44 miners

The Baltimore Mine Tunnel Disaster was an explosion that occurred on June 5, 1919 just inside the mouth of Baltimore Tunnel No. 2. The Delaware and Hudson Coal Company's mine employed 450 workers and was located in Wilkes-Barre, Pennsylvania, about a mile from the center of the city near the modern day corner of North Sherman, Spring, and Pine Streets. Ninety-two miners were killed and 44 injured in the explosion, which was caused by the ignition of black blasting powder. Only 7 miners escaped without injury.

Safety violations have been cited as a cause for the explosion, by sending miners into the mine with powder in their cart line. Testimony reinforced the theory that the likely cause was a loose power cable that came in contact with the trolley, though a later investigation thought that open flames were the more probable cause. It was one of the deadliest industrial disasters in Pennsylvania history and led to the prohibition of miners and explosives being transported at the same time.

== Description ==
The Baltimore Mine Tunnel Disaster was an accidental explosion that occurred on June 5, 1919 just inside the mouth of Tunnel No. 2 in the Delaware and Hudson Coal Company's Baltimore Mine. The coal mine was located in Wilkes-Barre, Pennsylvania, about a mile from the center of the city. At the time, D&H employed 450 workers at the mine. Ninety-two miners were killed in the explosion, which was caused by the ignition of black blasting powder. Another 44 miners were injured, with only 7 escaping unharmed.

More than 100 miners were riding in "trip of mine cars" drawn by a motor, with at least one car carrying blasting powder. About 200 feet (61 m) from the entrance, the power cable's sparks detonated the powder. The ventilating shaft drew the flames into the tunnel toward the miners.

Many survived the blast and were not immediately killed from the explosion; most of those who died were victims of severe burns and of smoke inhalation. Miners who were close to the explosion had their clothes set on fire. Only those who acted quickly enough were able to jump into small pools of water to put out the flames. As the injured and dead were removed from the mine, ambulances and doctors arrived relatively late since the accident happened at such an early hour and they had to be woken up.

== Accounts of the accident ==
Jacob Milz was a track layer who was positioned in the first car of a train in the tunnel, behind the cart motor. After feeling the shock of the explosion, Milz left the cart and crawled through the thickening smoke to the “G vein” where there was good circulation of air. Once he arrived at the G vein, he led the survivors with him on the rescue attempt. The majority of those injured, but not killed, were evacuated in an hour.

In the aftermath of the accident, Mr. John McGroarty—the motorman during the explosion—was called upon to testify in front of the Pennsylvania Bureau of Mines and representatives from the Delaware and Hudson Coal Company, the company that owned the mine. McGroarty stated that he was stopped before entering the mine because of a fallen trolley cable. Upon entering the mine to fix the cable, he found the fallen cable and was going to order the power to be shut off, but the explosion stopped him before he could alert anyone. McGroarty was among the rescuers, but lost consciousness and woke up sitting in a hospital bed.

== Possible causes ==
In the testimonies of survivors of the accident, it was reported that the cause was a loose power cable that came in contact with the trolley. The main testimony of John McGroarty before the chief of the Pennsylvania Bureau of Mines, Seward Button, and representatives of the Delaware and Hudson Coal Company stated that a bracket holding the conductor for the cart motor had fallen. According to McGroarty, his crew entered the mine to where the bracket fell and were going to request power to be shut off for repairs, but were stopped by the explosion. Most of the reports that came out the next day in newspapers printed the testimony of McGroarty and agreed with the other eyewitness accounts of survivors that were inside the tunnel at the time of the explosion.

The exact way that the powder was ignited is unknown. Among the possible explanations are matches for lighting pipes and lanterns; a crowbar making contact with a live power cable, thereby creating sparks; or by a loose electrical cable. The causes of the tunnel explosion were reported through witness testimonies and through the formal investigation of the accident. In the formal investigation of the accident there were three possibilities proposed for what could have caused the ignition of the blasting powder: electrical sparks or current, open lanterns, and lighted tobacco pipes.

For the topic of electricity, the main focus was on a drill or crowbar touching the power cable, or one of the cans was brought into direct contact with a low hanging power cable. This theory was concluded to be improbable since there were no drills or crowbars found in the debris and there were no signs of arcing from electricity. It was also concluded that the probability of a crew member placing a powder can on the edge of a mine cart in just the right spot to touch the power cable was also extremely low, since it would almost have to be done on purpose. The report goes on to conclude that electricity was an improbable cause because of the lack of arc burns on the mine carts and powder cans.

The theories of an open lamp or a lit pipe igniting the powder were much more probable—as stated in the report—as lamps were found in the debris and attached to places near where powder would be located. It was also noted that miners would trade blasting powder if they did not bring enough for the day's job, allowing sparks from lit matches or tobacco pipes to contact the powder.

== Legislative action ==
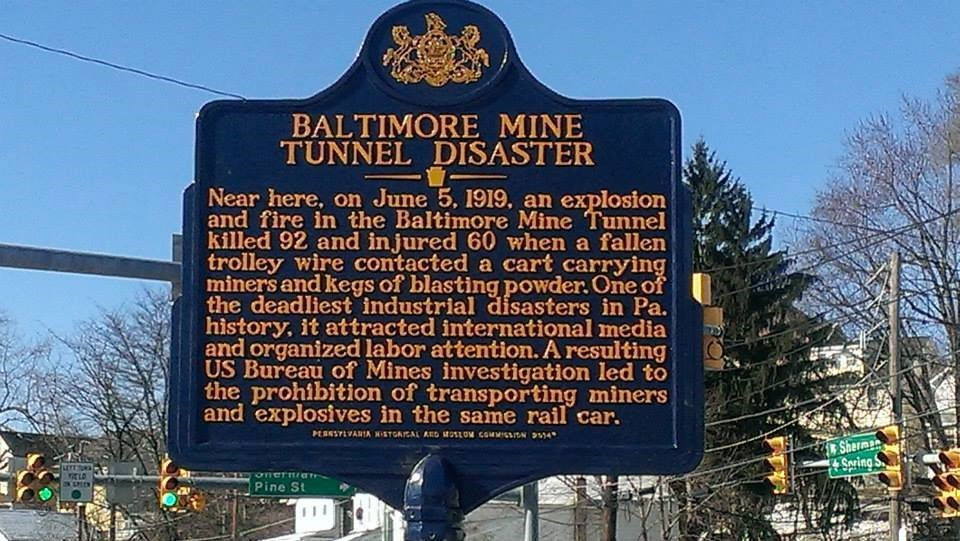
A historical marker was erected in 2013 to commemorate the disaster

After the mine tunnel disaster, many questioned the laws regarding coal mining. It is also said that the safety regulations that were put in place at the time were not followed in their entirety, but the laws regarding the safety practices were too ambiguous to impose any punishments. The official report done on the accident stated that it was not the mining company's fault nor was it the miners’, because the laws in place were ambiguous and the mining code did not apply to the new mining techniques. The law cited in the report was Rule 1, Article XII, where the owner of the mine was responsible for every precaution that should be taken for the safety of workers. Other sources speak about the mining code of Pennsylvania being broken by sending miners into the mine with powder in their cart line. The mine code prevents the transportation of powder in the same mine train as workers. At the end of the legal report, a series of suggestions are stated in order to improve mining conditions, including restricting the distribution of blasting powder to employees, and recommending that the Governor William C. Sproul, should revise the laws focused on mining.
