= Jack Naylor =

American inventor

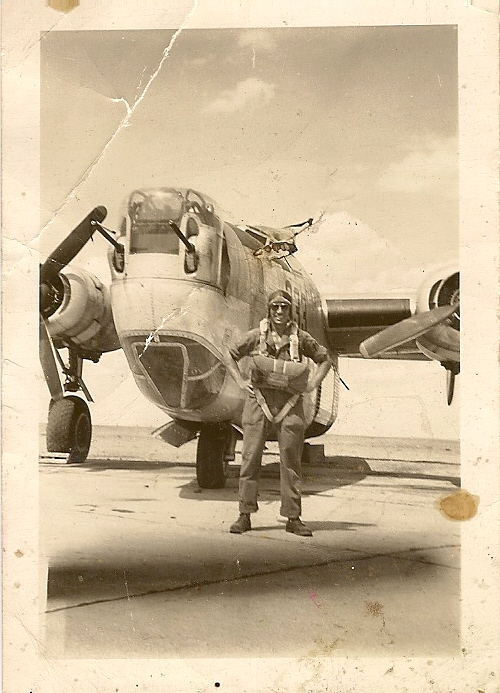
- Born: Thurman F. Naylor; June 24, 1919; Baltimore, Maryland, U.S.
- Died: November 26, 2007 (aged 88); Chestnut Hill, Massachusetts, U.S.
- Resting place: Temple Israel Cemetery; Wakefield, Massachusetts, U.S.
- Occupation: Inventor

Thurman F. "Jack" Naylor (June 24, 1919 – November 26, 2007) was an American inventor. Naylor was born in Baltimore, Maryland. Naylor learned to fly early. After joining the USAF, he trained and saw combat in P51 fighter planes over France and Germany. He switched to B24s and flew forays over Eastern Europe and ended up bombing the infamous oil refineries in Ploiesti, Romania. It was a momentous time and out of the windows of his bomber planes he was able to feed his growing passion for photography by shooting aerial pictures using a purloined Voigtländer. While based in Bengasi, Libya, he met Margaret Bourke-White and flew her along on his missions. She insisted on traveling with "Captain Jack" because he always "came back" which was a major feat back and forth over the Mediterranean.

== Post WWII ==
Back stateside after the war, Naylor used the GI Bill to finish a degree in mechanical engineering from prestigious Johns Hopkins University in Baltimore, Maryland. But for his first job after graduation he chose to capitalize on his training during the war and became a test pilot. He put experimental planes through their paces until he crashed one into a river bank next to a pasture. The farmer ran up holding his mangled propeller blade and announced "son, you lost this thing..." The accident cut his swashbuckling career short.

Putting that dangerous occupation aside, Naylor became a consultant to industry. Hired to advise companies in how to grow and manage their resources, he was asked to prepare one of them for bankruptcy. Seeing the value in the business, Naylor embarked on yet another career as an entrepreneur and, in 1970, took over Thomson International Corporation which was headquartered in Waltham, Massachusetts. The engineering and manufacturing company made automotive and airplane parts. In the reorganization, Naylor moved to Massachusetts, made some tough choices by cutting personnel and closed extraneous plants.

Thomson's biggest seller was car thermostats and heat exchangers for aircraft engines. In desperation, Naylor, living out of a hotel room, sat in the restaurant at the Somerset Hotel in Boston and, over a matter of months, designed a new automotive thermostat. Able to work reliably at higher temperatures, it allowed the car designers to use smaller radiators. He took it to General Motors first, next Chrysler, Ford and then to Europe.

== Success with Thomson ==
The previously mentioned product line led to manufacturing and engineering plants in 13 countries. Naylor traveled extensively in the 1980s and early 1990s. He not only ran his own business, Naylor sat on the boards of directors of several FORTUNE 500 companies, Kodak being one of them. In order to meet all of his business obligations, Naylor spent a lot of time in the air. Tired of waiting in foreign countries for commercial airlines that would eventually not show up, Naylor bought his own plane and moved about the world on his company Gulfstream jet. Visiting customers and plants in Japan, he always brought back a new camera.

== The Collecting Years ==
When he began his collecting, Naylor concentrated on cameras and photographs, but he quickly expanded to all manner of ephemera and kinds of photographs. Much of the collection was acquired at camera and antique shows, auctions, and yard sales. Many of the items were donated by photographers and inventors of the paraphernalia that supports photography. Since Boston is one of the epicenters of photography, he befriended innovators like Edwin Land, who founded Polaroid and "Doc" Harold Edgerton, professor of MIT, who invented the strobe light. Naylor owns the notebooks and scientific equipment of Leopold Godowsky, who along with Leopold Mannes co-invented the first color film.

The majority of the thirty thousand object collection is displayed at Naylor's suburban Boston home. The 1031 daguerreotypes outnumber the 725 owned by the Library of Congress and include unique examples produced by practitioners of the medium such as, Southworth & Hawes, Whipple, and Mathew Brady.

The dozens of glass display cases contain the world's largest collection of cameras used for espionage. Equipment produced for spying that spans the period from the American Civil War through the Cold War with Russia. Cameras worn by homing pigeons in the First World War, cameras mounted onto U2 spy planes, books, watches and cigarette lighters that conceal picture making devices. East German Stasi, British OSS, CIA and FBI are all represented. He acquired some of the most select items in the 1980s from a KGB agent he met in the USSR on a business trip.

Naylor has original glass plates by Edward Curtis, pictures taken with huge field cameras while Curtis traversed the American West for thirty years, documenting Native Americans and their vanishing cultures. This means that at least one piece of Curtis' anthropological project was preserved since most of his negatives were destroyed.

Upstairs, there is a library of over 3000 volumes. Packed away are books, journals, notebooks, albums and first editions, including a complete limited edition set of Pencil of Nature, the first commercial book that included photographs.

Naylor has been the subject of articles in Smithsonian magazine and Wall Street Journal. He and his collection have been on NPR and the Discovery Channel.

== Death ==
Naylor died on November 26, 2007, in Chestnut Hill, Massachusetts, at the age of 88, in his sleep from complications of spinal cancer.
