= Mary Elizabeth Hawkins =

Canadian birth control activist (1875–1950)

- Born: Mary Elizabeth Chambers; July 31, 1875; New York City, United States
- Died: 1950; Hamilton, Ontario, Canada
- Education: Vassar College (1897)
- Occupations: Charity worker, social reformer
- Organizations: Hamilton Birth Control League; Birth Control Society of Hamilton
- Known for: Founder of Canada's first birth control clinic
- Spouse: William Clark Hawkins

Mary Elizabeth Hawkins, née Chambers (1875–1950) was a Canadian charity worker, founder of Canada's first birth control clinic. A widow in Hamilton, Ontario, Hawkins founded the Hamilton Birth Control League in 1931, which soon established a birth control clinic in the city.

== Life ==
Mary Elizabeth Chambers was born in New York City on July 31, 1875, the daughter of Frank Ross Chambers and Mary Elizabeth Pease. She graduated from Vassar College in 1897 and in the following year married William Clark Hawkins, an engineer. The pair moved to Hamilton, Ontario in 1901.

Hawkins became an active charity worker in Hamilton. During World War I she served as administrator for the Canadian Field Comforts Commission. She helped found the Family Service Bureau in 1923, the Community Chest in 1927, and the Women's Civic Club. She was active in the Red Cross, and also served as president of an Infant's Home.

== Founding of the Hamilton birth control clinic ==
In 1931, Hawkins founded the Hamilton Birth Control League, later known as the Birth Control Society of Hamilton, after years of work in the city's charitable and welfare organizations. A graduate of Vassar College and a prominent Hamilton volunteer, she had helped establish the Family Service Bureau and the Community Chest and had become deeply involved in maternal and child welfare. During the economic crisis of the Great Depression, she came to regard access to reliable birth-control information as a matter of public health and social welfare rather than private morality.

Hamilton proved a receptive setting for Hawkins's efforts because it already had a strong network of women involved in organized charity, child welfare, and social reform. Early discussions of the new movement took place privately; historians have noted that the initiative first operated "behind the closed living room doors of Hamilton's wealthy matrons", with Hawkins among the leading organizers.

Working through these reform networks, Hawkins organized the opening of a clinic in Hamilton on 3 March 1932. Contemporary and later historical sources regard it as the first birth-control clinic in Canada. The legal and social risks were considerable: the Criminal Code still prohibited the sale, advertisement, and dissemination of contraceptive information unless it could be defended as serving the public good. Hawkins nevertheless moved ahead, presenting the clinic as a practical response to poverty, maternal ill health, and the pressures faced by large families during the Depression.

Hawkins's role was primarily organizational and administrative. She established the clinic, oversaw its fundraising and operations, and secured medical participation for a venture that many physicians considered professionally and legally risky. The first doctor hired as medical director resigned after only three weeks. Hawkins then approached Elizabeth Bagshaw and persuaded her to assume the position; Bagshaw would remain medical director for more than three decades.

The clinic's early years also reflected the controversy surrounding contraception. According to Hamilton historical sources, some local clerics and traditionalists denounced birth control as "a dirty thing", and several physicians refused to rent the clinic medical space. Despite these obstacles, Hawkins and her allies succeeded in keeping the clinic open through donations, volunteers, and discreet local support. By the end of its first year, approximately 398 women had received advice at the clinic.

Hawkins remained president of the organization from the clinic's founding until her death in 1950.
