= Edward Simons Fulmer =

US Army Air Force pilot

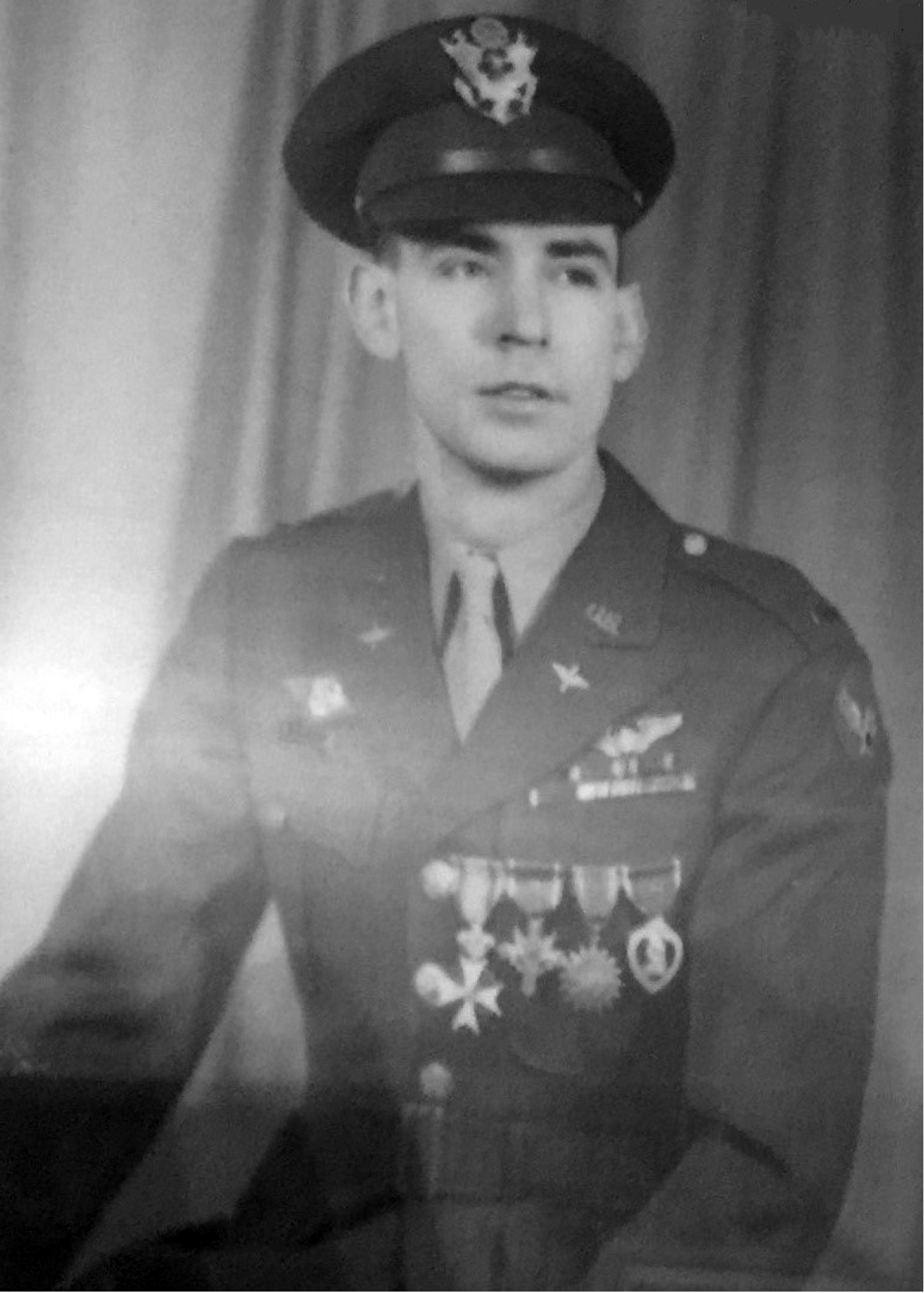
- The young Knight MWO Edward S. Fulmer
- Born: April 16, 1919; East Syracuse, United States
- Died: December 31, 2017 (aged 98); Syracuse, New York, United States
- Military career
- Allegiance: United States
- Branch: United States Army Air Forces
- Rank: Second Lieutenant
- Unit: 82nd Airborne Division
- Conflicts: World War II: Operation Market Garden
- Awards: Distinguished Service Cross; Purple Heart; Air Medal; N.Y. Conspicuous Service Cross; Military Order of William (Netherlands)

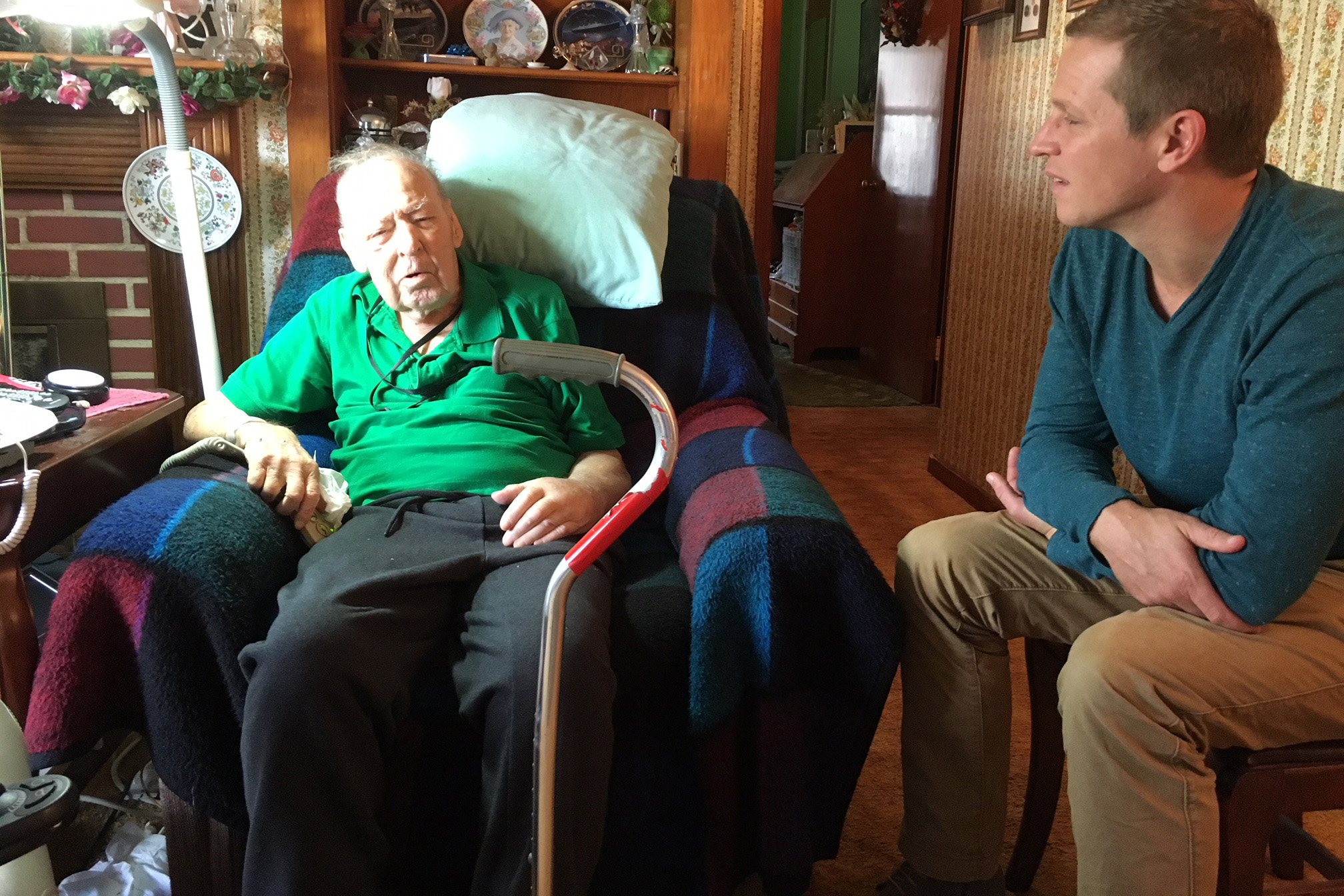
Fulmer with fellow knight Gijs Tuinman in November 2017

Edward Simons Fulmer (16 April 1919 – 31 December 2017) was an officer and pilot of the United States Army Air Forces. At the time of his death Fulmer was one of the only four living knights of the very exclusive Military Order of William, the highest honour of the Kingdom of the Netherlands.

== Biography ==
Born on 16 April 1919 in East Syracuse, Fulmer has been a lifelong resident of the area.

During World War II second lieutenant Fulmer served as a pilot of the United States Army Air Forces with the 43d Troop Carrier Squadron, 315th Troop Carrier Group, 9th Air Force.

On 18 September 1944, during the battles of the 82nd Airborne Division in Operation Market Garden, he was the second pilot on a Douglas C-47 Skytrain, carrying an entire unit of British parachute troops and an amount of explosive substances, planned to descend with gliders to the area around Ede. Over ’s-Hertogenbosch the airplane was heavily damaged by defensive fire from the Wehrmacht, which caused the pilot to lose consciousness and produced a heavy fire on board. Taking over control of the aircraft, Fulmer made sure the troops and the rest of the crew could save themselves by parachute. In the meantime he suffered serious burns to the face, neck, back, and arms. Nonetheless, he managed to crash land the airplane in an heroic attempt to also save the life of the unconscious pilot. Upon landing, the plane burst into uncontrollable flames and Fulmer was able to escape through a side window. He was then taken care of by Dutch resistance fighters.

After the war, he was awarded the Distinguished Service Cross in 1945.

In 1946 Fulmer was knighted by Queen Wilhelmina of the Netherlands, receiving the fourth class knighthood in the Military Order of William (RMWO). This order is the highest and oldest order of chivalry of the Kingdom of the Netherlands, bestowed for "performing excellent acts of bravery, leadership and loyalty in battle".

Fulmer and his wife of 73 years, Lucille White Fulmer had three children: Edward, Randy and Linda.

He died at the VA Hospital in Syracuse, New York on 31 December 2017 at the age of 98.

Airmen of the Royal Netherlands Air Force kept watch during a vigil and the commemoration ceremony was attended by Major Gijs Tuinman RMWO, the Dutch Ambassador to the United States and the chairman of the Chancellery of the Orders of the Netherlands, Major-General (Ret) Henk Morsink. On this occasion, Morsink said: "I had the honor to meet him three times in recent years, and I would like to repeat the words of General Patton: We should not cry for the loss of this man, but we may thank God for the honor and privilege of this great man, Edward Simons Fulmer. We will never forget Ed."

== Honors and awards ==
=== Badges and awards ===
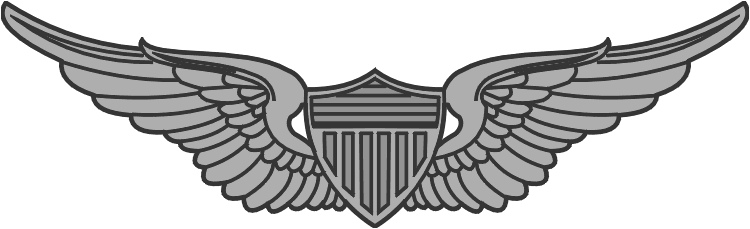

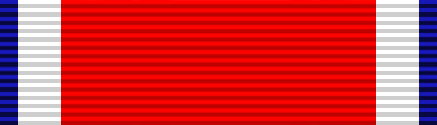

Army Air Forces pilot wings
Distinguished Service Cross	Purple Heart	Air Medal	N.Y. Conspicuous Service Cross

=== Military Order of William citation ===
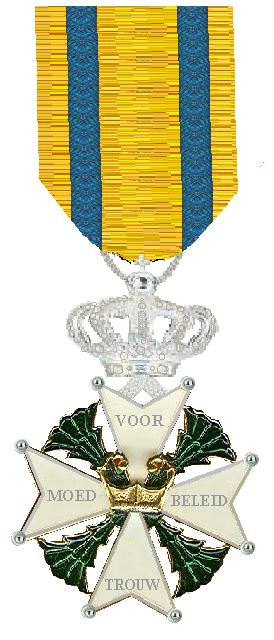
RMWO 4th Class

By royal decree No. 26 of 17 October 1946: knight 4th class in the Military Order of William for:

Has distinguished himself in battle by performing excellent deeds of bravery, leadership and loyalty in the following way:
On 18 September 1944 he was the second pilot of a Douglas C-47 aircraft during the air raid on the Netherlands.
The airplane of lieutenant Fulmer, carrying an entire unit of parachute troops and an amount of very explosive substances, was heavily damaged by anti-aircraft fire from the Germans, causing the pilot to lose consciousness and a heavy fire. Taking over the steering wheel of the machine, he remained steadfast at his post, while the parachute troops and the crew were able to save themselves by jumping out of the plane.
Despite serious burns to the face, neck, back and arms, he managed to land the airplane in an heroic attempt to save the life of the unconscious pilot. Lieutenant Fulmer has shown extraordinary heroism and did not take his own safety into account.

=== Distinguished Service Cross citation ===
By General Orders No. 21 (1945) of the Headquarters, U.S. Strategic Forces in Europe:

The President of the United States of America, authorized by Act of Congress July 9, 1918, takes pleasure in presenting the Distinguished Service Cross to Second Lieutenant (Air Corps) Edward Simons Fulmer, United States Army Air Forces, for extraordinary heroism in connection with military operations against an armed enemy while serving as Co-Pilot of a C-47 transport aircraft of the 43d Troop Carrier Squadron, 315th Troop Carrier Group, 9th Air Force, during an air mission against enemy forces over Holland on 18 September 1944.
On that date, Lieutenant Fulmer was serving as Co-Pilot of a C-47 transport carrying a full complement of paratroopers as well as high explosives. The plane was badly damaged by enemy fire and the pilot rendered unconscious. Taking over the controls, Lieutenant Fulmer remained at his post until the paratroopers jumped to safety. Despite severe burns on his face, neck, back and arms, he managed to land the aircraft in an heroic effort to save the unconscious pilot's life. Upon landing, the plane burst into uncontrollable flames and Lieutenant Fulmer was able to escape through a side window.
Second Lieutenant Fulmer's unquestionable valor in aerial combat is in keeping with the highest traditions of the military service and reflects great credit upon himself and the United States Army Air Forces.

== Literature ==
- Aggelen van, L. (2018). Edward Simons Fulmer - Ridder Militaire Willems-Orde (in Dutch). Arnhem: White Elephant Publishing. ISBN 978-90-79763-20-7.
