= Gregory J. Weissenberger =

American flying ace

Gregory Weissenberger
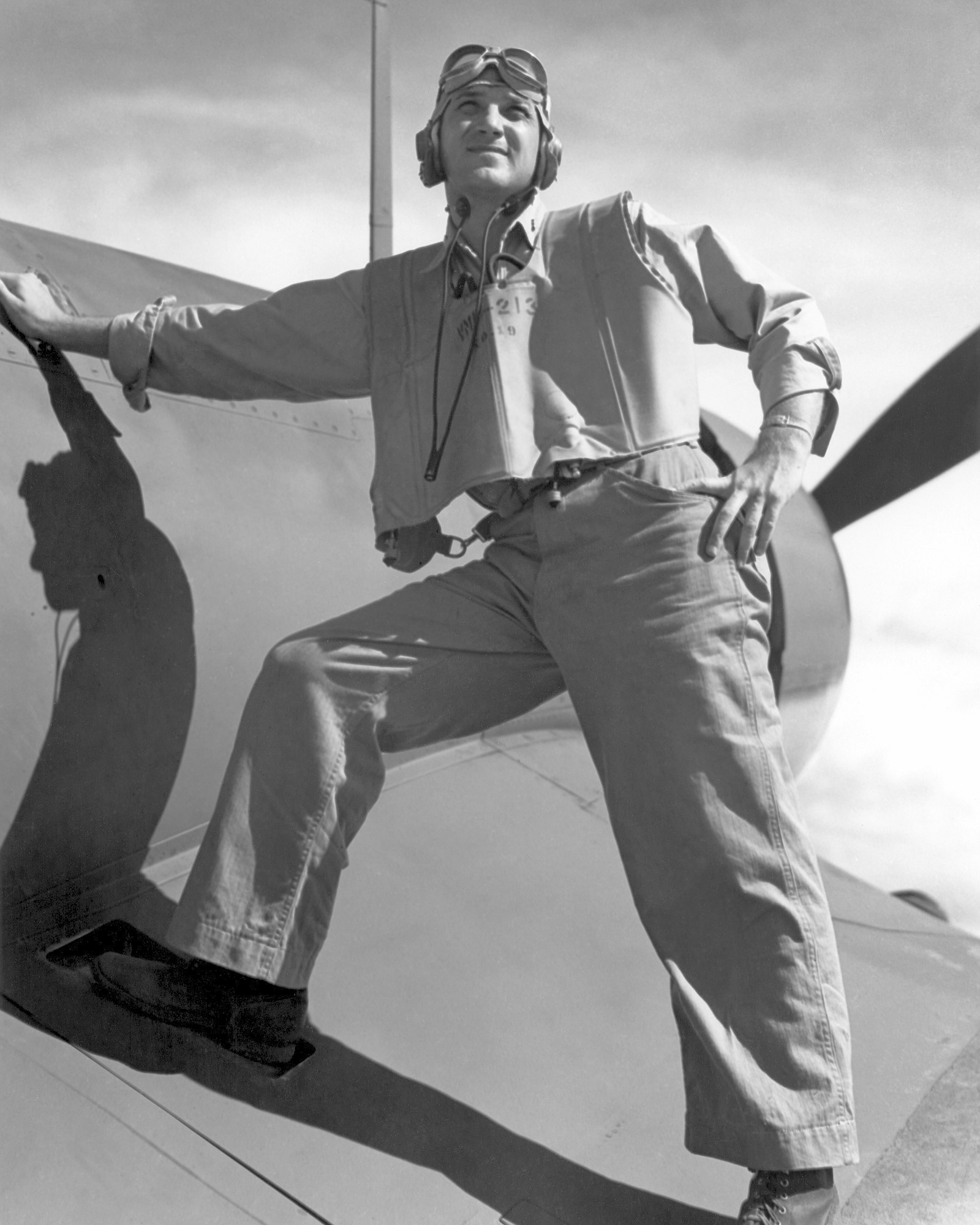
- Weissenberger at Henderson Field, in Guadalcanal, in 1943
- Born: August 16, 1914; Dallas, Texas
- Died: 1985; Ventura, California
- Allegiance: United States
- Service / branch: United States Marine Corps
- Rank: Colonel
- Awards: Distinguished Flying Cross (3)

Gregory Joseph Weissenberger (1914–1985) was a World War II fighter ace who served in the US Marine Corps. He is credited with five aerial victories, and reached the rank of Colonel during his service in the Marines.

== Aerial Combat ==
During a combat sortie Weissenberger was engaged with Japanese Zeros, and his plane was hit by enemy fire but he was also wounded at the same time. Weissenberger managed to shoot down the Zero that hit him and then bailed out. He was later rescued by the United States Navy. Weissenberger was considered to be a great flight instructor, for the way he explained aircraft to fellow marine aviators.
