= George L. Wrenn =

George Wrenn
- Born: 16 April 1915; Greenwood, South Carolina
- Died: 21 September 1992 (aged 77); Charlotte, North Carolina
- Military career
- Allegiance: United States
- Branch: United States Navy
- Service years: 1942–1966
- Rank: Lieutenant
- Conflicts: Pacific War
- Awards: Navy Cross; Distinguished Flying Cross

George Leroy Wrenn (16 April 1915 – 21 September 1992) was an American flying ace during World War II.
