= Norman Garbo =

American writer (1919–2017)

Norman Robert Garbo (February 15, 1919 – December 20, 2017) was an American author, lecturer and portrait painter.

== Life and career ==
Garbo was born in New York City on February 15, 1919, as the son of Maximilian W. and Fannie Garbo. He attended City College (now known as the City College of the City University of New York) from 1935 to 1937. Garbo also studied at the New York Academy of Fine Art from 1937. He began working as a portrait painter in 1941 and also worked as a writer and lecturer. In 1941, he joined the military with the start of World War II. He enlisted in the U.S. Army Air Forces, where he achieved the rank of lieutenant.

Garbo married Rhoda Locke on April 15, 1942. The couple's son and only child is named Mickey. Garbo later resided in Sands Point, an area of Long Island, New York. He died there on December 20, 2017, at the age of 98.

== Selected bibliography ==
- Pull up an Easel (1955, 1976)
- Confrontation with Howard Goodkind (1966)
- The Movement (1969)
- To Love Again: A Psychiatrist's Search for Love (1977)
- The Artist (1978)
- Cabal (1979)
- The Spy (1980)
- Turner's Wife (1983)
- Gaynor's Passion (1985)
- A Sudden Madness (1985)
- Dirty Secrets (1989)
