= First Security Bank – Montana =

First Security Bank
- Type: Public
- Industry: Finance
- Founded: 1919 as Security Bank and Trust
- Headquarters: Bozeman, Montana, USA
- Key people: Jim Ness, President
- Products: Commercial and consumer loans, real estate financing, checking and savings products, online banking, online business Cash Management, mobile banking, eStatements, investments through First Security Financial Services, and insurance through First Security Insurance.
- Number of employees: Over 150
- Website: www.ourbank.com

First Security Bank – Montana is a division of Glacier Bank based in Bozeman, Montana. It is the area's largest bank in deposit market share and number of locations. First Security serves Gallatin County. The bank has branches in Bozeman, Belgrade, Three Forks, Big Sky, West Yellowstone, and Four Corners.

First Security Bank is one of the top employers in Gallatin County and was recognized as Montana's Employer of Choice (over 25 employees) in 2013 by the Montana State Employer's Council (MSEC).

== Company history ==
First Security Bank opened on Bozeman's Main Street in 1919 with four employees under the name "Security Bank and Trust". Thanks to the investment of local businessmen, the bank survived the Great Depression and continued to grow. Eventually, expanded staff moved to a new building just east of the original location in 1957. This building was financed by Robert Bradford and George Dieruf, owners of the Powderhorn. In the 1970s the banks's name was changed to the current First Security Bank, which better reflected the focus on loans and deposits versus trust services.

The late 1990s through 2006 was a time of significant physical expansion for First Security. In 1994, a second Bozeman location was completed near the Montana State University campus. First Security Bank of Belgrade, an affiliate bank chartered by Inter-Mountain Bancorp, Inc., opened April 1, 1997. It became a branch of First Security Bank in December 1998. In 2000, the branch in Three Forks, formerly Security Bank of Three Forks, was added. In 2001, the merger of First Security Bank of West Yellowstone was completed. The merger of First State Bank of Fort Benton occurred in 2002. A branch built in Big Sky opened in December 2005. The newest branch in Bozeman, at the corner of Cottonwood and Huffine, opened in May 2006.

First Security Bank added three additional branches in October, 2016 through a merger with Teton Banks. Located in Fairfield, Choteau, and Vaughn, the locations create added convenience for First Security customers throughout the Golden Triangle.

In October, 2017 Inter-Mountain Bancorp, Inc. announced it had entered into an agreement to combine with the Glacier Bancorp family of banks. First Security Bank will officially be under the Glacier Bancorp umbrella as of March 1, 2018. The new relationship will eventually lead to First Security Bank’s Golden Triangle locations joining First Bank of Montana in Lewistown under the First Bank of Montana name. First Security’s Gallatin County locations will merge with Big Sky Western Bank under the First Security Bank name and brand.

First Security Bank and its employees serve local communities through a variety of non-profit activities.

== Locations ==
Bozeman, MT; Belgrade, MT; Three Forks, MT; Big Sky, MT; West Yellowstone, MT; Four Corners
