= Mary Ann Hawkins =

American surfing pioneer

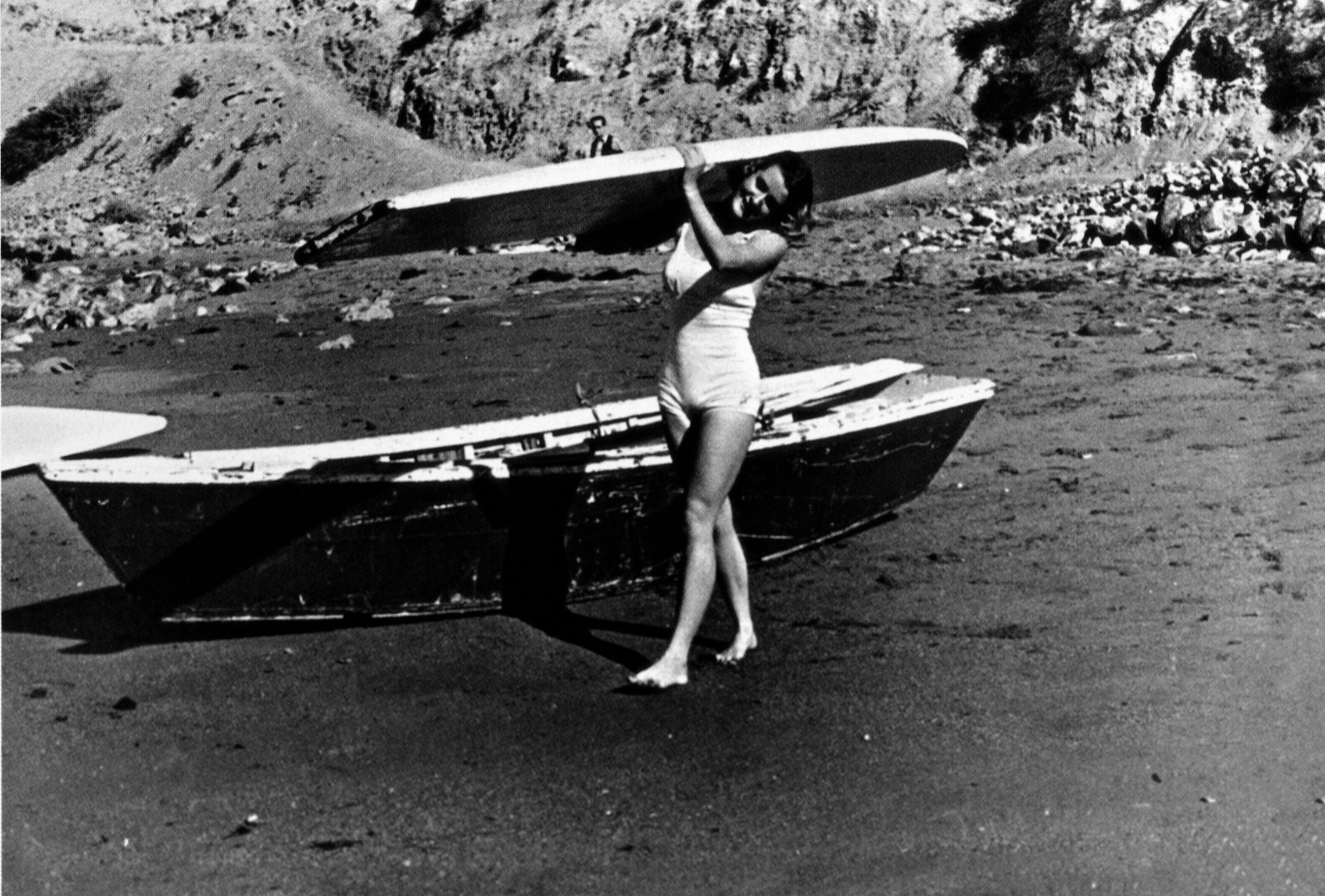
- Mary Ann Hawkins carrying her surfboard in Bluff Cove, Palos Verdes, originally published in Life Magazine.
- Born: 7 March 1919; Pasadena, California, U.S.
- Died: 28 January 1993 (aged 73); Tucson, Arizona, U.S.

Mary Ann Hawkins (March 7, 1919 – January 28, 1993) was an American surfer, paddleboarder, swimmer, and stunt-woman. Inspired by Duke Kahanamoku, she began swimming at a young age which led to her subsequent accomplishments in surfing, paddleboarding, and stunt work in Hollywood. Despite her talents, she dealt with sexism throughout her career but was still able to create a lasting legacy for women in sports and entertainment.

== Biography ==
Mary Ann Hawkins was born in Pasadena to a bookkeeper and a collector of dolls. She joined the YMCA and was inspired by one of Duke Kahanamoku's swimming exhibitions when she was around ten. Thereafter she began training and taking part in swimming competitions. She also competed in paddleboarding competitions and was the lone female entrant in the Catalina-to-Hermosa Beach aquaplane race in 1939. She finished in 14th place. When not competing Hawkins worked as a Hollywood movie stunt double and put on performances for hotels in Hawai'i. She also spent thirty years teaching very young children how to swim. Hawkins married four times. She had a daughter Kathy with her first husband Bud Morrissey. She had a son, Rusty, with her second husband, Don McGuire. Though years and thousands of miles apart, both men drowned in boating accidents. Her other husbands were Fred Sears and Jack Midkiff. When she finally retired from the water Hawkins and Midkiff moved to Tucson, Arizona where Hawkins died from cancer in 1993.

== Swimming ==
Mary Ann Hawkins began swimming in the late 1920s in Pasadena, California. At 14, in 1933, she won the National Junior Championship in the 880-yard freestyle with the Los Angeles Athletic Club. She later competed in two ocean swimming events in Venice and Hermosa Beach, sparking her love for swimming in the ocean. In 1934 her family moved to Costa Mesa to be closer to the Pacific Ocean so that she could build her ocean swimming endurance. Hawkins claims that this idea “actually backfired, because right away I started learning to body surf and then started going tandem as I met the surfing boys. And I fell so much in love with surfing and body surfing that I never really did my best in swimming from that point on.” In 1935, she moved to Santa Monica to be closer to the Los Angeles Athletic Club.

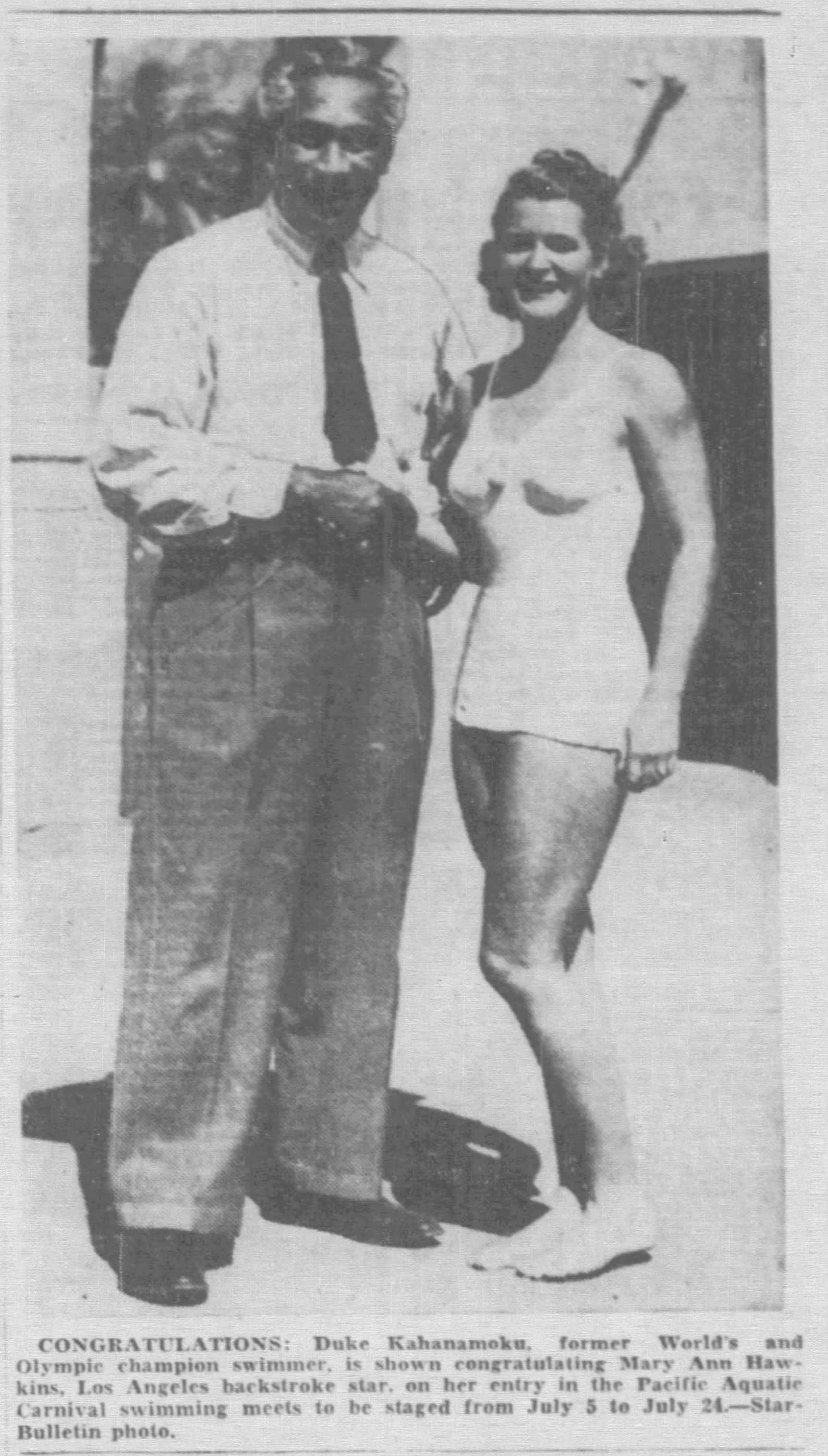
Mary Ann Hawkins with her childhood hero, Duke Kahanamoku.

Hawkins competed for the next five years and won many indoor and outdoor competitions ranging from 800 yards to one mile in San Diego, Los Angeles, and Santa Barbara. In 1936 she became the Amateur Athletic Union 500-meter freestyle champion. In July 1939 Hawkins travelled to Hawaii to compete in the Pacific Aquatic Carnival. On the first day of the swim meet, she won the 100-meter freestyle and earned second place in the 100-meter backstroke and 300-meter IM. On the second day she won the 200-meter freestyle, setting a new Hawaiian record. On the third day she earned second in the half mile ocean swim. Finally, on the fourth day of the meet she collected second place in the 100-meter and 220-meter freestyle events.

Indicative of the type of competitor she was, in May 1938 Hawkins swam as an "unofficial" entrant in the lifeguarding competition for Los Angeles County. She swam as well as the top men but was not offered a position because at the time women were not allowed to become lifeguards.

Following her swimming career, in 1956 Hawkins began teaching swimming classes in Waikiki, specializing in babies. She made a friend in hotel owner Henry Kaiser, who built her a small, heated pool for her to teach in. For thirty years, she. taught babies from six weeks to three years old to swim at the Mary Ann Sears Swim School in Waikiki. She left a legacy in drowning prevention by teaching so many people to swim at such a young age.

== Surfing and paddleboarding ==
Mary Ann Hawkins discovered surfing in Corona del Mar, California when she was fifteen years old, where she met and befriended lifeguard Gene “Tarzan” Smith and surfer Lorrin “Whitey” Harrison, whom she tandem-surfed with often. A common notion is that these two taught her to surf; however, Hawkins has admitted that she taught herself to surf, stating, “I didn’t think to ask, and nobody thought to ask me if I wanted to learn in those days." It’s a common misconception that Hawkins won women's surfing competitions in the 1930s. She was a successful surfer, landing in Life Magazine in 1938, but there were few surf competitions for women at this time; she did, however, win three paddleboard competitions.

Hawkins competed and won against men in an 880-yard paddleboard race in 1934 with the Ambassador Swim Team. Out of the first five women’s paddleboard races in the 1930s, Hawkins won three of them: the first at San Onofre in 1936, the second at Venice in 1938, and the national paddleboard championships held in Long Beach in November, 1938, cementing her status as "Queen of the Surf."

Hawkins described incidents of sexism in surfing at a young age. In 1935, when she was still learning, she related: “This young kid, he was probably 14, felt I’d gotten in his way, and started swearing, and said that girls didn’t belong in the surf. That really put a damper on me, as far as my own surfing went, because from then on I always tried to stay out of the way of the boys … I just didn’t get in there and fight. I tried to stay out of the way. If I had it to do over again it would be a little bit different.” Later in life when she had more confidence, she had an encounter with another male surfer at Malibu. She said that he “started griping because a female was in the surf.” She then caught a large wave, one of the best rides of her life. She said, “I knew he couldn’t surf very well. He didn’t know who I was, and I decided I’d show him!”
