= Marion F. Kirby =

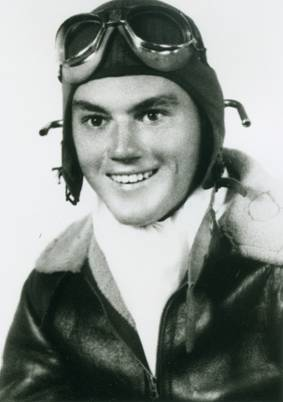
- Born: July 14, 1919; Louisville, Kentucky, United States
- Died: July 10, 2011 (aged 91); Lometa, Texas, United States
- Military career
- Allegiance: United States
- Branch: United States Army Air Forces
- Service years: 1940–1945
- Rank: Captain
- Commands: 80th Fighter Squadron
- Conflicts: World War II
- Awards: Silver Star; Distinguished Flying Cross; Air Medal (4)

Marion Franklin Kirby II (July 14, 1919 – July 10, 2011) was an American fighter pilot and a flying ace with the United States Army Air Forces during World War II, credited with shooting down 5 enemy aircraft.

He transferred into the 475th Fighter Group when it formed in New Guinea.
