= 1927 in the United States =

- Decades: 1900s; 1910s; 1920s; 1930s; 1940s
- See also: History of the United States (1918–1945); Timeline of United States history (1900–1929); List of years in the United States

Events from the year 1927 in the United States.

== Incumbents ==
=== Federal government ===
- President: Calvin Coolidge (R-Massachusetts)
- Vice President: Charles G. Dawes (R-Illinois)
- Chief Justice: William Howard Taft (Ohio)
- Speaker of the House of Representatives: Nicholas Longworth (R-Ohio)
- Senate Majority Leader: Charles Curtis (R-Kansas)
- Congress: 69th (until March 4), 70th (starting March 4)

==== State governments ====
Governors and lieutenant governors

=== Governors ===
- Governor of Alabama: William W. Brandon (Democratic) (until January 17), Bibb Graves (Democratic) (starting January 17)
- Governor of Arizona: George W. P. Hunt (Democratic)
- Governor of Arkansas: Tom Jefferson Terral (Democratic) (until January 11), John Ellis Martineau (Democratic) (starting January 11)
- Governor of California: Friend Richardson (Republican) (until January 4), Clement C. Young (Republican) (starting January 4)
- Governor of Colorado: Clarence Morley (Republican) (until January 11), Billy Adams (Democratic) (starting January 11)
- Governor of Connecticut: John H. Trumbull (Republican)
- Governor of Delaware: Robert P. Robinson (Republican)
- Governor of Florida: John W. Martin (Democratic)
- Governor of Georgia: Clifford Walker (Democratic) (until June 25), Lamartine G. Hardman (Democratic) (starting June 25)
- Governor of Idaho: Charles C. Moore (Republican) (until January 3), H. C. Baldridge (Republican) (starting January 3)
- Governor of Illinois: Len Small (Republican)
- Governor of Indiana: Edward L. Jackson (Republican)
- Governor of Iowa: John Hammill (Republican)
- Governor of Kansas: Ben S. Paulen (Republican)
- Governor of Kentucky: William J. Fields (Democratic) (until December 13), Flem D. Sampson (Republican) (starting December 13)
- Governor of Louisiana: Oramel H. Simpson (Democratic)
- Governor of Maine: Owen Brewster (Republican)
- Governor of Maryland: Albert C. Ritchie (Democratic)
- Governor of Massachusetts: Alvan T. Fuller (Republican)
- Governor of Michigan: Alex Groesbeck (Republican) (until January 1), Fred W. Green (Republican) (starting January 1)
- Governor of Minnesota: Theodore Christianson (Republican)
- Governor of Mississippi: Henry L. Whitfield (Democratic) (until March 18), Dennis Murphree (Democratic) (starting March 18)
- Governor of Missouri: Samuel Aaron Baker (Republican)
- Governor of Montana: John E. Erickson (Democratic)
- Governor of Nebraska: Adam McMullen (Republican)
- Governor of Nevada: James G. Scrugham (Democratic) (until January 3), Fred B. Balzar (Republican) (starting January 3)
- Governor of New Hampshire: John Gilbert Winant (Republican) (until January 6), Huntley N. Spaulding (Republican) (starting January 6)
- Governor of New Jersey: A. Harry Moore (Democratic)
- Governor of New Mexico: Arthur T. Hannett (Democratic) (until January 1), Richard C. Dillon (Republican) (starting January 1)
- Governor of New York: Al Smith (Democratic)
- Governor of North Carolina: Angus Wilton McLean (Democratic)
- Governor of North Dakota: Arthur G. Sorlie (Republican)
- Governor of Ohio: A. Victor Donahey (Democratic)
- Governor of Oklahoma: Martin E. Trapp (Democratic) (until January 10), Henry S. Johnston (Democratic) (starting January 10)
- Governor of Oregon: Walter M. Pierce (Democratic) (until January 10), I. L. Patterson (Republican) (starting January 10)
- Governor of Pennsylvania: Gifford Pinchot (Republican) (until January 18), John Stuchell Fisher (Republican) (starting January 18)
- Governor of Rhode Island: Aram J. Pothier (Republican)
- Governor of South Carolina: Thomas Gordon McLeod (Democratic) (until January 18), John Gardiner Richards, Jr. (Democratic) (starting January 18)
- Governor of South Dakota: Carl Gunderson (Republican) (until January 4), William J. Bulow (Democratic) (starting January 4)
- Governor of Tennessee: Austin Peay (Democratic) (until October 3), Henry Hollis Horton (Democratic) (starting October 3)
- Governor of Texas: Miriam A. Ferguson (Democratic) (until January 17), Dan Moody (Democratic) (starting January 17)
- Governor of Utah: George Dern (Democratic)
- Governor of Vermont: Franklin S. Billings (Republican) (until January 6), John E. Weeks (Republican) (starting January 6)
- Governor of Virginia: Harry F. Byrd (Democratic)
- Governor of Washington: Roland H. Hartley (Republican)
- Governor of West Virginia: Howard M. Gore (Republican)
- Governor of Wisconsin: John J. Blaine (Republican) (until January 3), Fred R. Zimmerman (Republican) (starting January 3)
- Governor of Wyoming: Nellie Tayloe Ross (Democratic) (until January 3), Frank C. Emerson (Republican) (starting January 3)

=== Lieutenant governors ===
- Lieutenant Governor of Alabama: Charles S. McDowell (Democratic) (until January 17), William C. Davis (Democratic) (starting January 17)
- Lieutenant Governor of Arkansas: Harvey Parnell (Democratic) (starting month and day unknown)
- Lieutenant Governor of California: Clement Calhoun Young (Republican) (until January 6), Buron Fitts (Republican) (starting January 6)
- Lieutenant Governor of Colorado: Sterling Byrd Lacy (Democratic) (until January 11), George Milton Corlett (Republican) (starting January 11)
- Lieutenant Governor of Connecticut: J. Edwin Brainard (Republican)
- Lieutenant Governor of Delaware: James H. Anderson (Republican)
- Lieutenant Governor of Idaho: H. C. Baldridge (Republican) (until January 3), O. E. Hailey (Republican) (starting January 3)
- Lieutenant Governor of Illinois: Fred E. Sterling (Republican)
- Lieutenant Governor of Indiana: F. Harold Van Orman (Republican)
- Lieutenant Governor of Iowa: Clem F. Kimball (Republican)
- Lieutenant Governor of Kansas: De Lanson Alson Newton Chase (Republican)
- Lieutenant Governor of Kentucky: Henry Denhardt (Democratic) (until December 13), James Breathitt, Jr. (Democratic) (starting December 13)
- Lieutenant Governor of Louisiana: Philip H. Gilbert (Democratic)
- Lieutenant Governor of Massachusetts: Frank G. Allen (Republican)
- Lieutenant Governor of Michigan: George W. Welsh (Republican) (until January 1), Luren D. Dickinson (Republican) (starting January 1)
- Lieutenant Governor of Minnesota: William I. Nolan (Republican)
- Lieutenant Governor of Mississippi: Dennis Murphree (Democratic) (until March 18), vacant (starting March 18)
- Lieutenant Governor of Missouri: Philip Allen Bennett (Republican)
- Lieutenant Governor of Montana: W. S. McCormack (Republican)
- Lieutenant Governor of Nebraska: George A. Williams (Republican)
- Lieutenant Governor of Nevada: Maurice J. Sullivan (Democratic) (until January 3), Morley Griswold (Republican) (starting January 3)
- Lieutenant Governor of New Mexico: Edward G. Sargent (Republican)
- Lieutenant Governor of New York: Edwin Corning (Democratic) (starting January 1)
- Lieutenant Governor of North Carolina: Jacob E. Long (Democratic)
- Lieutenant Governor of North Dakota: Walter Maddock (Republican)
- Lieutenant Governor of Ohio: Charles H. Lewis (Republican) (until January 10), Earl D. Bloom (Democratic) (starting January 10)
- Lieutenant Governor of Oklahoma: vacant (until January 10), William J. Holloway (Democratic) (starting January 10)
- Lieutenant Governor of Pennsylvania: David J. Davis (Republican) (until January 18), Arthur H. James (Republican) (starting January 18)
- Lieutenant Governor of Rhode Island: Nathaniel W. Smith (Republican) (until month and day unknown), Norman S. Case (Republican) (starting month and day unknown)
- Lieutenant Governor of South Carolina: E. B. Jackson (Democratic) (until January 18), Thomas Bothwell Butler (Democratic) (starting January 18)
- Lieutenant Governor of South Dakota: Alva Clark Forney (Republican) (until January 4), Hyatt E. Covey (Republican) (starting January 4)
- Lieutenant Governor of Tennessee:
  - until month and day unknown: Lucius D. Hill (Democratic)
  - month and day unknown: Henry Hollis Horton (Democratic)
  - starting month and day unknown: vacant
- Lieutenant Governor of Texas: Barry Miller (Democratic)
- Lieutenant Governor of Vermont:
  - until month and day unknown: Walter K. Farnsworth (Republican)
  - month and day unknown: Hollister Jackson (Democratic)
  - starting month and day unknown: vacant
- Lieutenant Governor of Virginia: Junius Edgar West (Democratic)
- Lieutenant Governor of Washington: W. Lon Johnson (Republican)
- Lieutenant Governor of Wisconsin: Henry A. Huber (Republican)

== Events ==
=== January–March ===
- January 7 – The first transatlantic telephone call is made from New York City to London.
- January 17 – Bibb Graves is sworn in as the 38th governor of Alabama replacing William W. Brandon.
- February 23 – The U.S. Federal Radio Commission (later renamed the Federal Communications Commission) begins to regulate the use of radio frequencies.
- March 11
  - In New York City, the Roxy Theater is opened by Samuel Roxy Rothafel.a
  - The first armoured car robbery is committed by the Flatheads Gang near Pittsburgh, Pennsylvania.

=== April–June ===
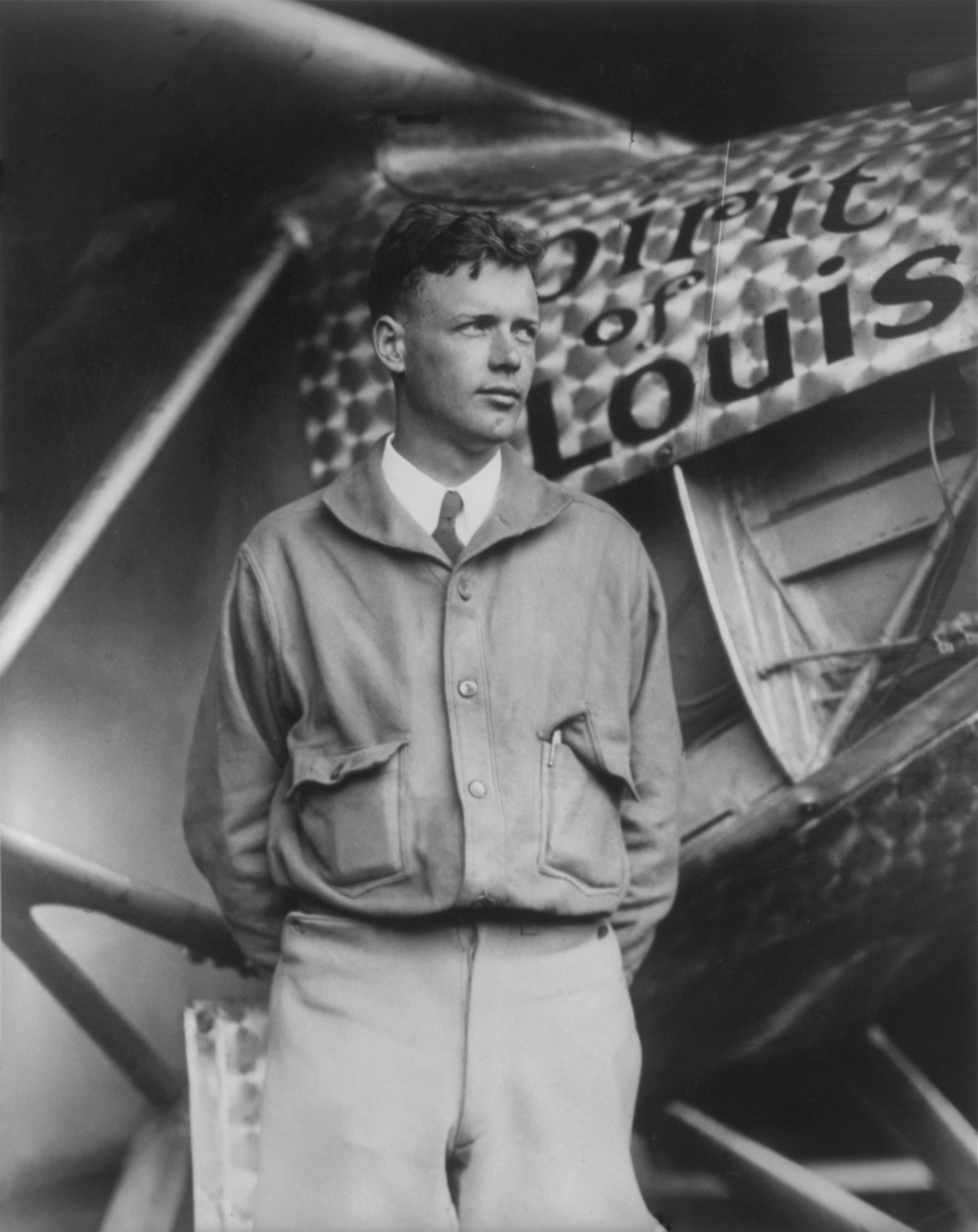
May 20–21: Charles Lindbergh flies from New York to Paris.

- April 19 – Actress-playwright Mae West is sentenced to ten days incarceration for "corrupting the morals of youth" for her comedy-drama Sex after 375 performances on Broadway.
- April 22–May 5 – The Great Mississippi Flood of 1927 affects 700,000 people in the greatest national disaster in U.S. history at this time.
- April 30 – The Federal Industrial Institute for Women opens near Alderson, West Virginia, as the first federal prison for women in the U.S.
- May 2 – Buck v. Bell decided in the Supreme Court of the United States, permitting compulsory sterilization of people with intellectual disability.
- May 11 – The Academy of Motion Picture Arts and Sciences, the "Academy" of the "Academy Awards," is founded.
- May 14 – The University of Chicago's local collegiate organization, Phi Sigma, becomes incorporated under the laws of the State of Illinois as Eta Sigma Phi, the National Honorary Classical Fraternity.
- May 17 – Army aviation pioneer Major Harold Geiger dies in the crash of his Airco DH.4 de Havilland plane, at Olmsted Field, Pennsylvania.
- May 18 – Bath School disaster: Bombings by a disaffected local official result in 45 deaths, mostly children, in Bath Township, Michigan.
- May 20–21 – Aviator Charles Lindbergh makes the first solo non-stop trans-Atlantic flight, from New York to Paris in the single-seat, single-engine monoplane Spirit of St. Louis.
- May 23 – Nearly 600 members of the American Institute of Electrical Engineers and the Institute of Radio Engineers view the first live demonstration of television at the Bell Telephone Building in New York.
- May 26 – The final Model T rolls off the assembly line at the Ford Motor Company factory in Highland Park, Michigan, ending a run of 19 years and 15 million cars.
- June 13 – A ticker-tape parade is held for aviator Charles Lindbergh down Fifth Avenue in New York City.

=== July–September ===
- August 2 – U.S. President Calvin Coolidge announces, "I do not choose to run for president in 1928."
- August 7 – The Peace Bridge opens between Fort Erie, Ontario, and Buffalo, New York.
- August 23 – After six years of appeals, as protests rage in capital cities around the world, Nicola Sacco and Bartolomeo Vanzetti are electrocuted at midnight in Charlestown, Massachusetts.
- August 26 – Paul Redfern leaves Brunswick, Georgia, flying his Stinson Detroiter Port of Brunswick to attempt a solo non-stop flight to Rio de Janeiro, Brazil, but later crashes in the Venezuela jungle (the crash site is never located).
- September 5 – Oswald the Lucky Rabbit makes his debut in Trolley Troubles.
- September 18 – The Columbia Phonographic Broadcasting System (later known as CBS) is formed and goes on the air with 47 radio stations.
- September 29 – 79 are killed and 550 are injured when a tornado strikes the St. Louis, Missouri area; it is the second-costliest and at least 24th-deadliest tornado in U.S. history.

=== October–December ===
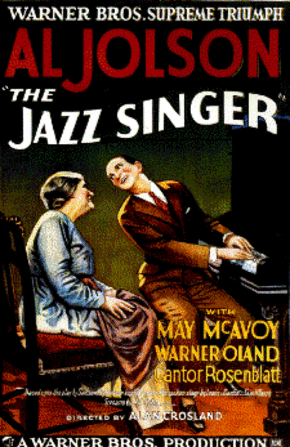
October 6: The Jazz Singer.

- October 6 – The Jazz Singer opens in Warner Brothers' flagship theater in New York City and becomes a huge success, leading to the end of the silent film era globally.
- October 8 – Murderer's Row: The New York Yankees complete a 4-game sweep of the Pittsburgh Pirates in the World Series.
- October 28 – Pan American Airways' first flight takes off from Key West, bound for Havana.
- November 3–4 – Floods devastating Vermont incur the "worst natural disaster in the state's history".
- November 4
  - Frank Heath and his horse Gypsy Queen return to Washington, D.C., having completed a 2-year journey of 11,356 miles to all 48 states.
  - The 7.3 M_{w} Lompoc earthquake affects the central coast of California with a maximum Mercalli intensity of VIII (Severe), causing a tsunami and moderate damage.
- November 10 – Unexplained explosions occur in Canton, Ohio.
- November 13 – The Holland Tunnel opens to traffic as the first Hudson River vehicular tunnel linking New Jersey to New York City.
- November 14 – The Pittsburgh Gasometer Explosion: Three Equitable Gas storage tanks in the North Side of Pittsburgh, Pennsylvania, explode, killing 26 people and causing damage estimated between contemporary totals of $4 million and $5 million.
- December 2 – Following 19 years of Ford Model T production, the Ford Motor Company unveils the Ford Model A as its new automobile.
- December 15 – Marion Parker, 12, is kidnapped in Los Angeles. Her dismembered body is found on December 19, prompting the largest manhunt to date on the West Coast for her killer, William Edward Hickman, who is arrested on December 22 in Oregon.
- December 17 – The U.S. submarine S-4 is accidentally rammed and sunk by the United States Coast Guard destroyer John Paulding off Provincetown, Massachusetts, killing everyone aboard after several unsuccessful attempts to raise the sub.
- December 27 – Kern and Hammerstein's musical play Show Boat, based on Edna Ferber's novel, opens on Broadway and goes on to become the first great classic of the American musical theatre.
- December - The Dearborn Independent is closed down after Lawsuits regarding antisemitic material published in the paper caused owner Henry Ford to close it.

=== Undated ===
- The Voluntary Committee of Lawyers is founded in New York to assist in bringing about the repeal of Prohibition of alcohol in the United States.

=== Ongoing ===
- Lochner era (c. 1897 – c. 1937)
- U.S. occupation of Haiti (1915–1934)
- Prohibition (1920–1933)
- Roaring Twenties (1920–1929)

== Births ==
=== January ===
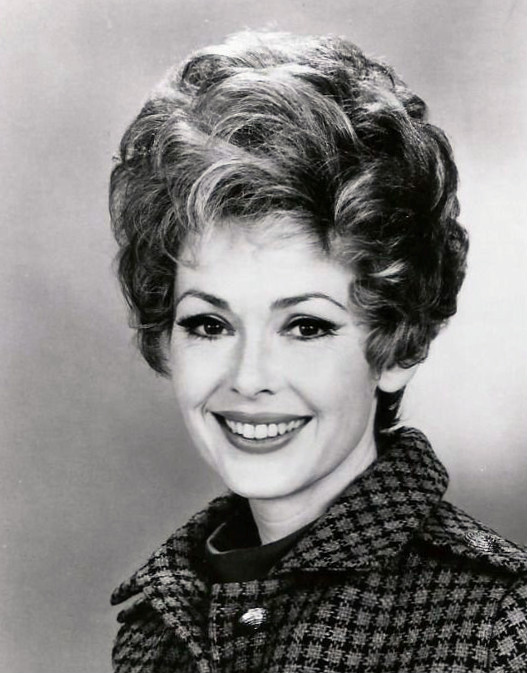
Barbara Rush

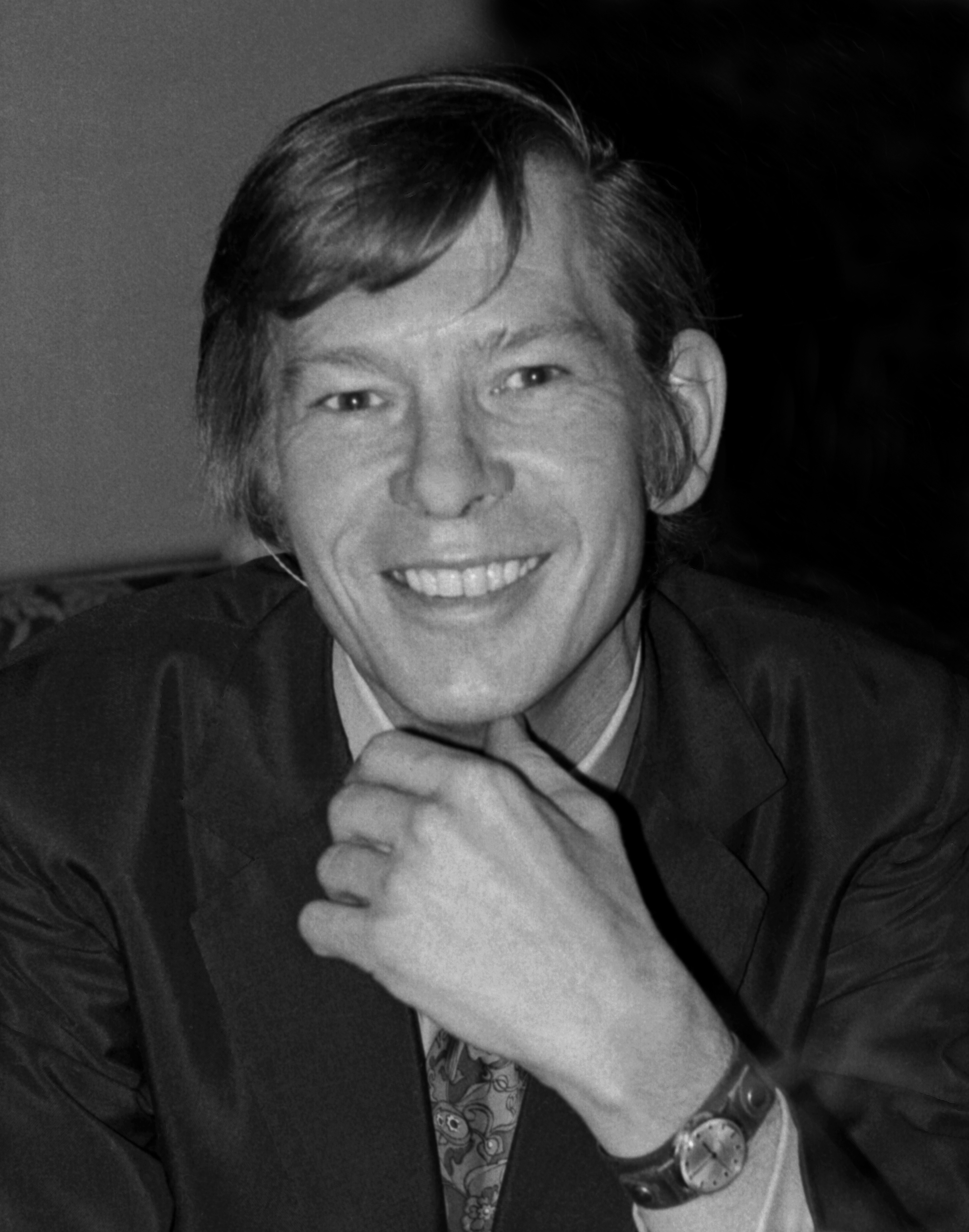
Johnnie Ray

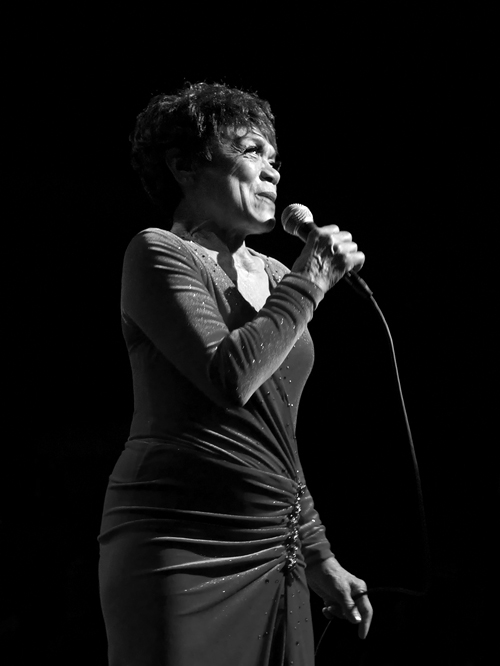
Eartha Kitt

- January 1
  - Vernon L. Smith, American economist, Nobel Prize laureate
  - Doak Walker, American football player (d. 1998)
- January 2 – Gino Marchetti, American football player (d. 2019)
- January 4
  - Lauro Cavazos, American politician and educator (d. 2022)
  - Barbara Rush, American actress (d. 2024)
- January 5 – Sivaya Subramuniyaswami, American guru and author (d. 2001)
- January 8 – Virginia Norwood, American physicist (d. 2023)
- January 10
  - Arthur Kramer, American lawyer (d. 2008)
  - Johnnie Ray, American singer, pianist and songwriter (d. 1990)
- January 13
  - Brock Adams, American politician (d. 2004)
  - Liz Anderson, American country music singer, songwriter (d. 2011)
- January 15 – Phyllis Coates, American actress (d. 2023)
- January 17
  - Thomas Anthony Dooley III, American physician, humanitarian (d. 1961)
  - Eartha Kitt, African-American singer, actress, activist, and author (d. 2008)
  - Harlan Mathews, American politician (d. 2014)
- January 22
  - Lou Creekmur, American football player (d. 2009)
  - Joe Perry, African-American football player (d. 2011)
- January 23
  - Robert L. Butler, American politician (d. 2019)
  - Ernest Hawkins, American football coach (d. 2018)
- January 24
  - Paula Hawkins, American politician (d. 2009)
  - Marvin Kaplan, American actor (d. 2016)
- January 25
  - Marian Brown, American celebrity icon (d. 2013)
  - Vivian Brown, American celebrity icon (d. 2014)
- January 27
  - Bob DeMoss, American football player (d. 2017)
  - Richard Fulton, American politician (d. 2018)
- January 28 – Vera Williams, American author and illustrator (d. 2015)
- January 31 – Jean Speegle Howard, American actress (d. 2000)

=== February ===
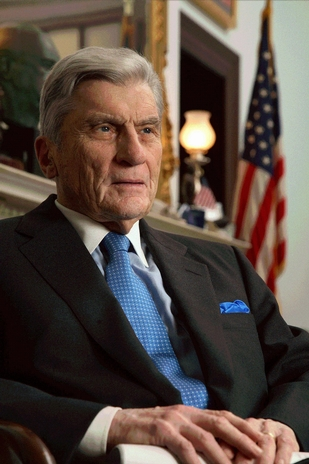
John Warner

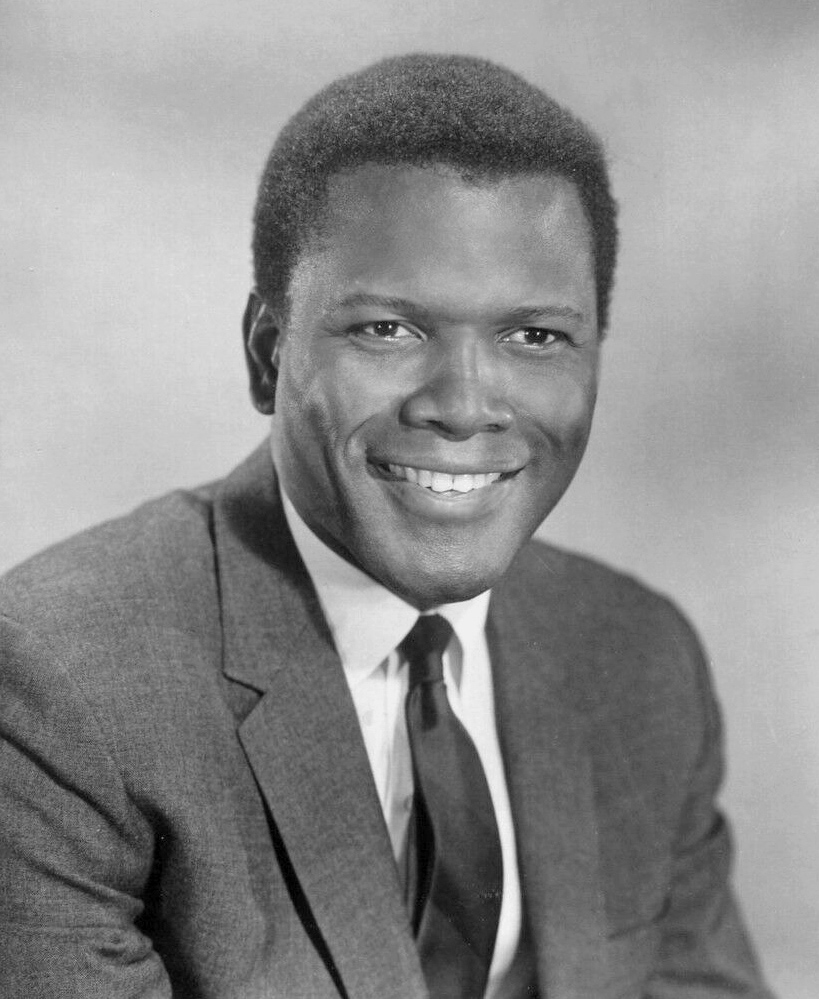
Sidney Poitier

- February 1 – Galway Kinnell, American poet (d. 2014)
- February 2
  - Stan Getz, American jazz saxophonist (d. 1991)
  - Doris Sams, American professional baseball player (d. 2012)
- February 3 – Kenneth Anger, American actor, director and screenwriter (d. 2023)
- February 6
  - William Gardner Smith, American novelist and journalist (d. 1974)
  - Art Stewart, American baseball executive and scout (d. 2021)
- February 8 – George Taliaferro, American football player (d. 2018)
- February 10 – Leontyne Price, African-American soprano
- February 11 – Nalda Bird, American professional baseball player (d. 2004)
- February 12
  - Ann Gillis, American actress (d. 2018)
  - Rita Meyer, American professional baseball player (d. 1992)
  - H. M. Wynant, American actor
- February 13 – Buck Hill, American jazz tenor, soprano saxophonist (d. 2017)
- February 15 – Harvey Korman, American actor and Comedian (d. 2008)
- February 17 – John Selfridge, American mathematician (d. 2010)
- February 18 – John Warner, American politician (d. 2021)
- February 20
  - Roy Cohn, American lawyer, anti-Communist (d. 1986)
  - Sidney Poitier, Bahamian-American actor, film director (d. 2022)
- February 21
  - Patricia Benoit, American actress (d. 2018)
  - Erma Bombeck, American humorist (d. 1996)
- February 22
  - Donald May, American actor (d. 2022)
  - Guy Mitchell, American singer and actor (d. 1999)
- February 23 – Paul W. Schroeder, historian (d. 2020)
- February 24 – Mark Lane, American conspiracy theorist (d. 2016)
- February 25
  - Dick Jones, actor, singer (d. 2014)
  - Ralph Stanley, American bluegrass banjo player and vocalist (d. 2016)
- February 26 – Tom Kennedy, American game show host (d. 2020)

=== March ===
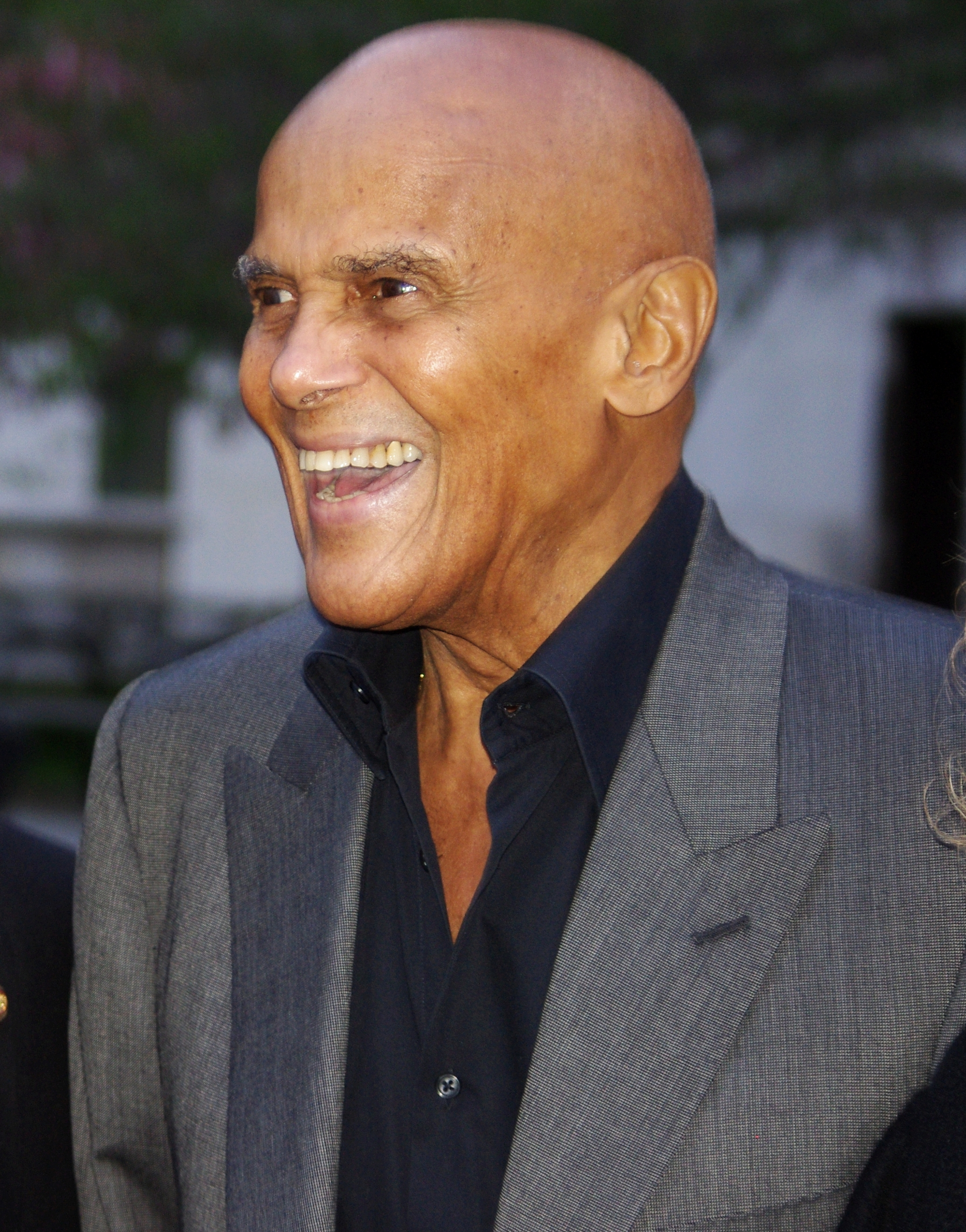
Harry Belafonte

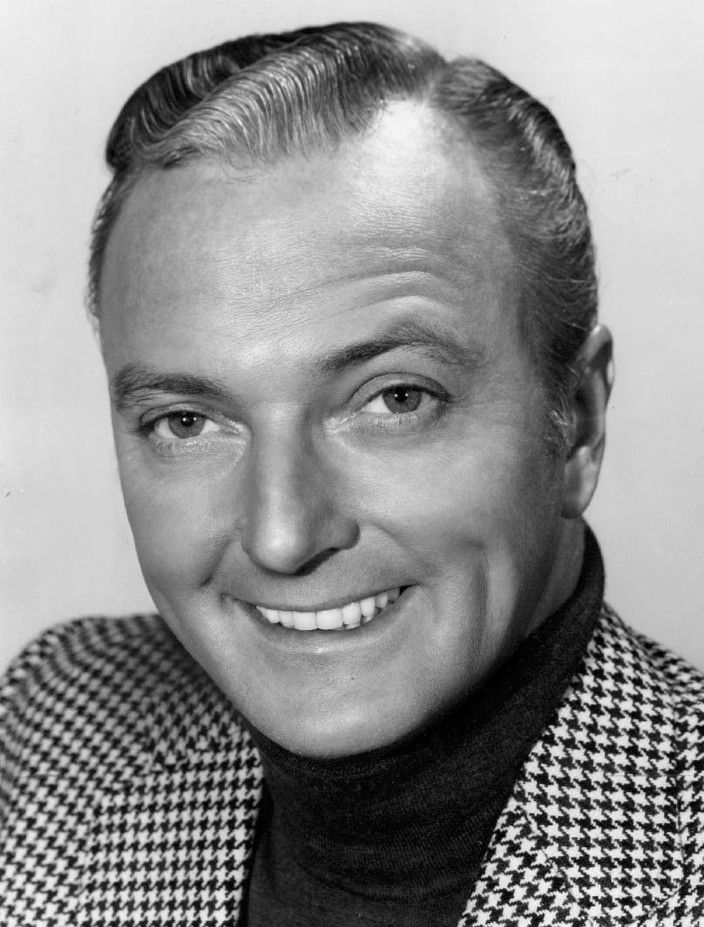
Jack Cassidy

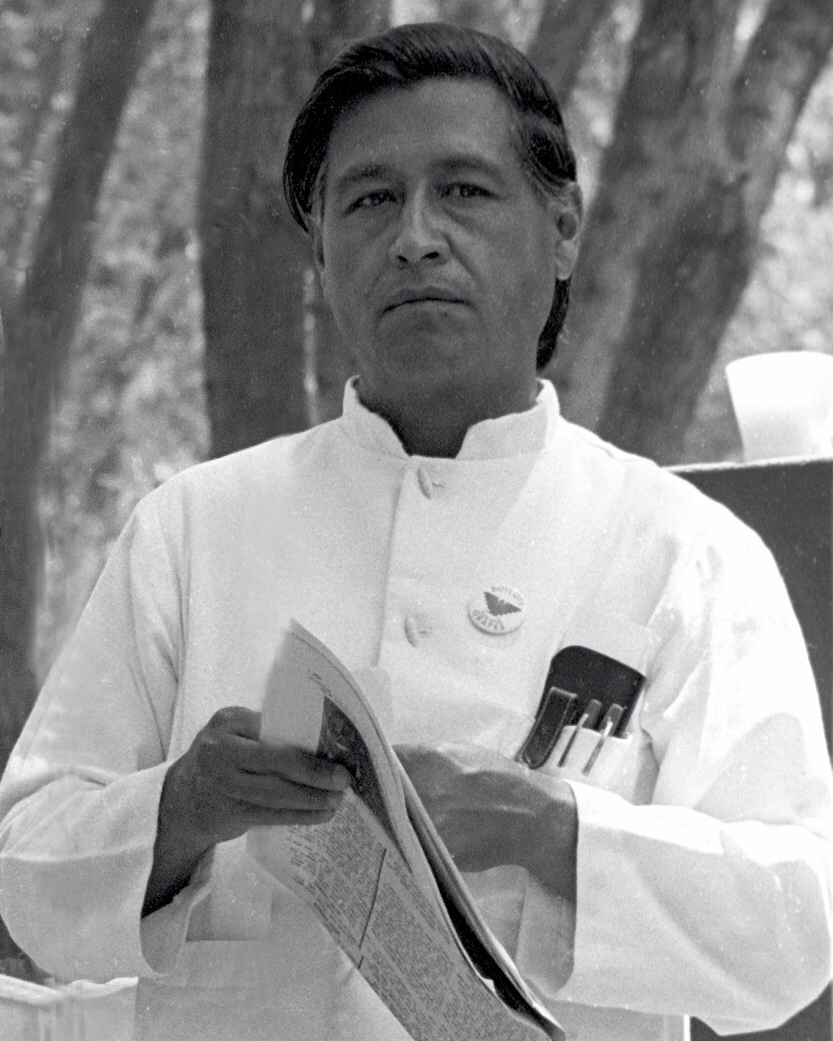
Cesar Chavez

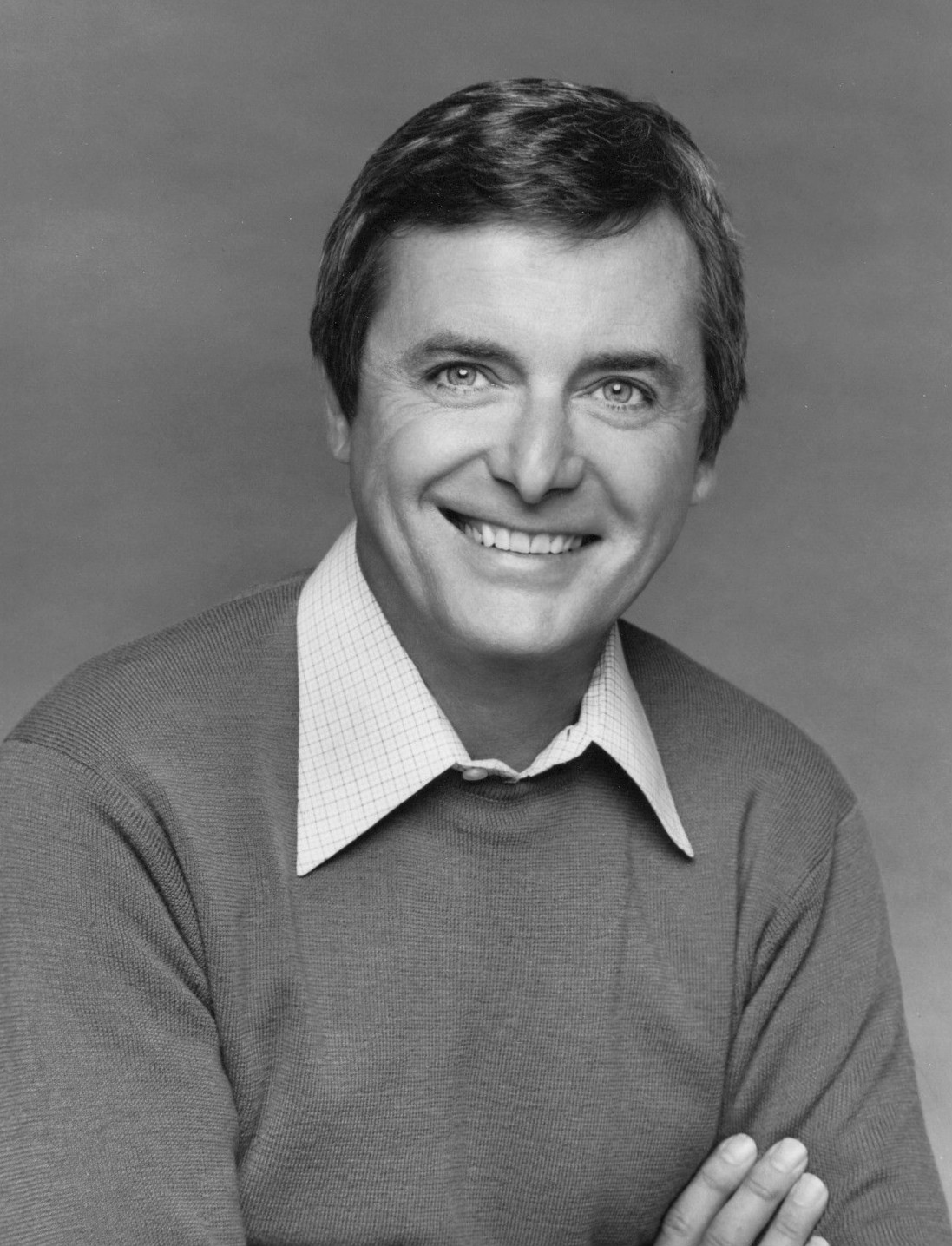
William Daniels

- March 1
  - George O. Abell, American astronomer, professor at UCLA, science popularizer, and skeptic (d. 1983)
  - Harry Belafonte, Jamaican-American musician, actor, and civil rights activist (d. 2023)
  - Robert Bork, American conservative law professor (d. 2012)
- March 3 – Harry Whittington, American lawyer, real estate investor and political figure (d. 2023)
- March 4
  - Phil Batt, American politician (d. 2023)
  - Thayer David, American actor (d. 1978)
  - Robert Orben, American comedy writer (d. 2023)
  - Dick Savitt, American tennis player (d. 2023)
- March 5 – Jack Cassidy, American actor and singer (d. 1976)
- March 6
  - William J. Bell, American soap creator (d. 2005)
  - Gordon Cooper, American astronaut (d. 2004)
  - Mel Groomes, American football player (d. 1997)
- March 7 – James Broderick, American actor (d. 1982)
- March 8 – Dick Hyman, American composer, pianist
- March 9 – Jackie Jensen, American baseball player (d. 1982)
- March 10 – Bill Fischer, American football offensive lineman (d. 2017)
- March 11 – Gloria Blackwell, African-American civil rights activist and educator (d. 2010)
- March 13 – Robert Denning, American interior designer (d. 2005)
- March 15
  - Annastasia Batikis, Greek-American female professional baseball player (d. 2016)
  - Aaron Rosand, American violinist (d. 2019)
  - Carl Smith, American country music singer (d. 2010)
- March 16 – Daniel Patrick Moynihan, American author, politician, and statesman (d. 2003)
- March 18 – George Plimpton, American writer and actor (d. 2003)
- March 19 – Richie Ashburn, American baseball player and sportscaster (d. 1997)
- March 20 – Earlene Risinger, American professional baseball player (d. 2008)
- March 21 – Jerome Chazen, American businessman (d. 2022)
- March 27 – Lorry I. Lokey, American businessman and philanthropist (d. 2022)
- March 29
  - Donn Kushner, American Canadian scientist and writer (d. 2001)
  - John Mclaughlin, American television and radio host (d. 2016)
- March 31
  - César Chávez, American labor activist, United Farm Workers founder (d. 1993)
  - William Daniels, American actor

=== April ===
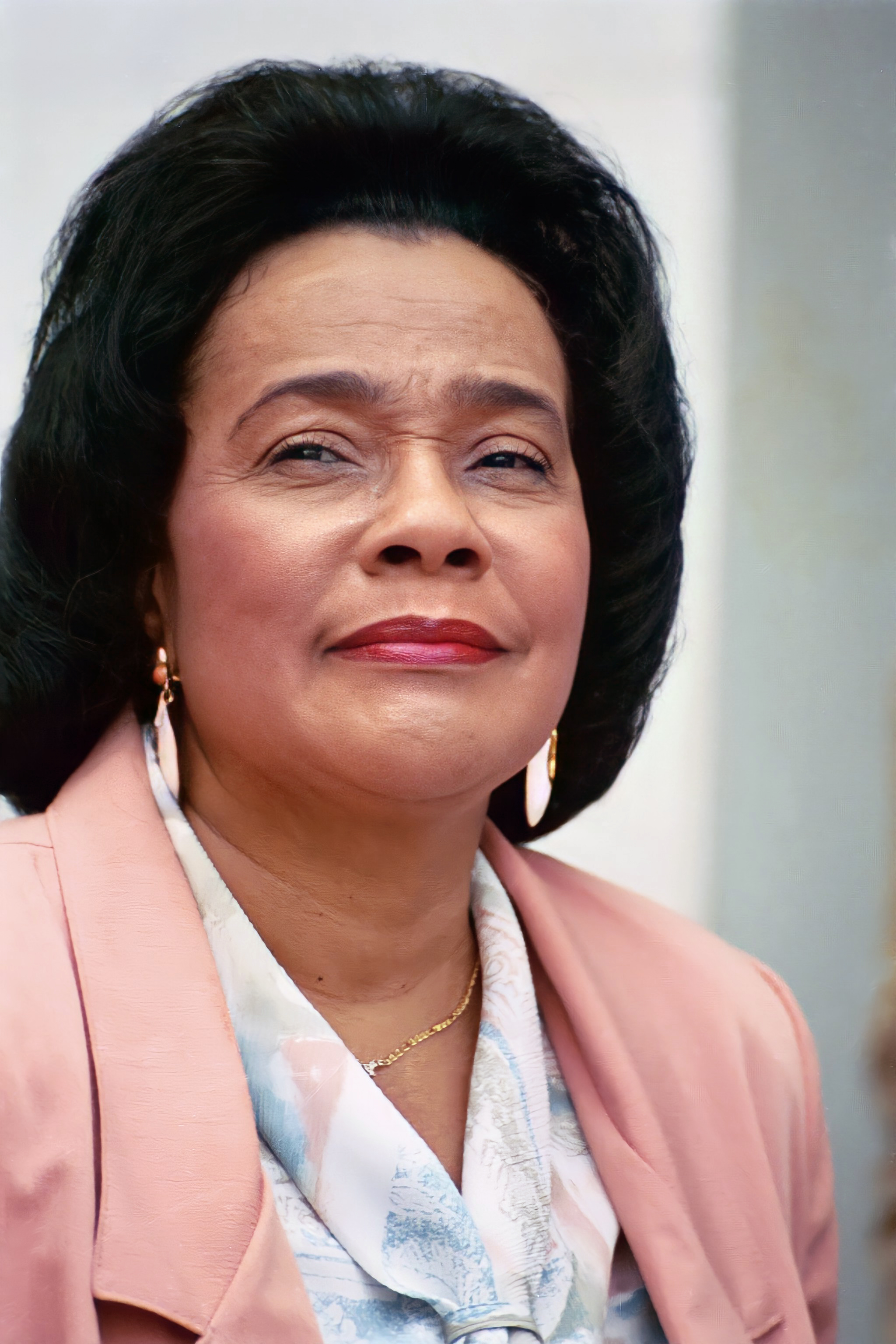
Coretta Scott King

- April 1 – Amos Milburn, American R&B singer-songwriter and pianist (d. 1980)
- April 2
  - Rita Gam, American actress (d. 2016)
  - Ken Sansom, actor, singer, and voice actor (d. 2012)
  - Rembert Weakland, American monk (d. 2022)
- April 6 – Gerry Mulligan, American musician (d. 1996)
- April 8 – Charlie Maxwell, American baseball player (d. 2024)
- April 10 – Marshall Warren Nirenberg, American biochemist and geneticist (d. 2010)
- April 12 – Alvin Sargent, American screenwriter (d. 2019)
- April 15 – Robert Mills, American physicist (d. 1999)
- April 16
  - John Chamberlain, American sculptor (d. 2011)
  - Doris McLemore, linguist (d. 2016) Her mother was Wichita and her father was European-American.
  - Peter Mark Richman, American actor (d. 2021)
- April 17 – Junior Collins, American-French horn player (d. 1976)
- April 18 – Samuel P. Huntington, American political scientist (d. 2008)
- April 20 – Phil Hill, American race car driver (d. 2008)
  - Anita Darian, American singer, actress (d. 2015)
  - Harry Gallatin, American basketballer, coach (d. 2015)
  - Jackie Robinson, American Olympic basketball player (d. 2022)
- April 26 – Harry Gallatin, American basketball player and coach (d. 2015)
- April 27 – Coretta Scott King, African-American civil rights activist (d. 2006)
- April 28 – William Lewis Moore, American postal worker (d. 1963)
- April 29 – Big Jay McNeely, R&B saxophonist (d. 2018)

=== May ===
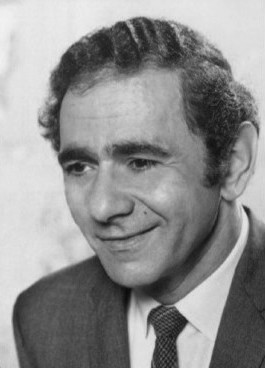
Michael Constantine

- May 4 – Hal Hudson, American baseball player (d. 2016)
- May 5 – Pat Carroll, American actress (d. 2022)
- May 10 – Mike Souchak, American golfer (d. 2008)
- May 13
  - Fred Hellerman, American folk singer (d. 2016)
  - Herbert Ross, American film director (d. 2001)
- May 19 – John Thompson, American football executive (d. 2022)
- May 20
  - Bud Grant, American football player and coach (d. 2023)
  - David Hedison, American actor (d. 2019)
- May 21 – Chuck Stewart, American photographer (d. 2017)
- May 22
  - Michael Constantine, American actor (d. 2021)
  - George D. Gould, American financier (d. 2022)
- May 24 – William Ennis Thomson, American music educator (d. 2019)
- May 25 – Robert Ludlum, American novelist (d. 2001)
- May 27
  - Ralph Carmichael, American composer and arranger (d. 2021)
  - Robert E. Finnigan, American scientist (d. 2022)
- May 28 – William A. Hilliard, American journalist (d. 2017)
- May 30 – Clint Walker, American actor (d. 2018)

=== June ===
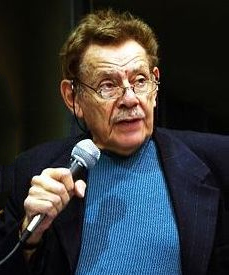
Jerry Stiller

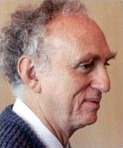
Martin Lewis Perl

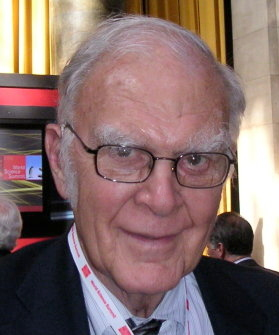
F. Sherwood Rowland

- June 1 – Joseph Z. Nederlander, American theater owner and operator (d. 2021)
- June 3 – Boots Randolph, American saxophone player (d. 2007)
- June 8 – Jerry Stiller, American actor (d. 2020)
- June 9 – George Nigh, American politician (d. 2025)
- June 10 – Eugene Parker, American astrophysicist (d. 2022)
- June 11 – John W. O'Malley, American Catholic historian, author and Jesuit priest (d. 2022)
- June 16 – George E. Johnson, American businessman (d. 2026)
- June 17
  - Austin Murphy, American politician (d. 2024)
  - Wally Wood, American cartoonist (d. 1981)
- June 18 – Bud Brown, American politician (d. 2022)
- June 19 – John Glenn Beall, Jr., American politician (d. 2006)
- June 21 – Carl Stokes, American politician (d. 1996)
- June 23 – Bob Fosse, American choreographer (d. 1987)
- June 24 – Martin Lewis Perl, American physicist, Nobel Prize laureate (d. 2014)
- June 25
  - Gerald Freedman, American theatre director, librettist, lyricist and college dean (d. 2020)
  - Chuck Smith, American pastor (d. 2013)
- June 27
  - John Barber, American professional basketball player
  - Bobby Myers, American NASCAR driver (d. 1957)
  - William Post, American businessman and inventor (d. 2024)
- June 28
  - Dick Lane, American professional baseball player (d. 2018)
  - Frank Sherwood Rowland, American chemist, Nobel Prize laureate (d. 2012)
- June 29
  - Roy Radner, American economist (d. 2022)
  - Bert Hubbard, American synchronized swimmer, choreographer and coach
  - Kenneth Snelson, American contemporary sculptor, photographer (d. 2016)
- June 30
  - Shirley Fry Irvin, American tennis player (d. 2021)
  - Frank McCabe, American basketball player (d. 2021)

=== July ===
Neil Simon

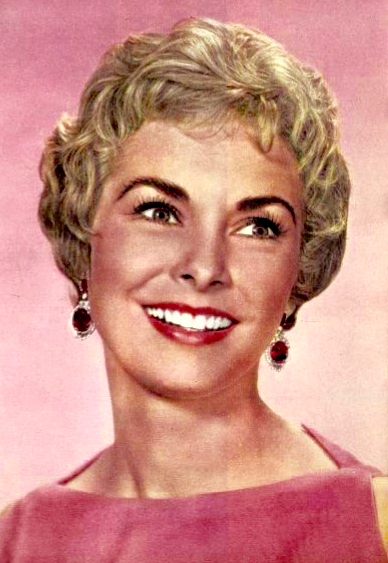
Janet Leigh

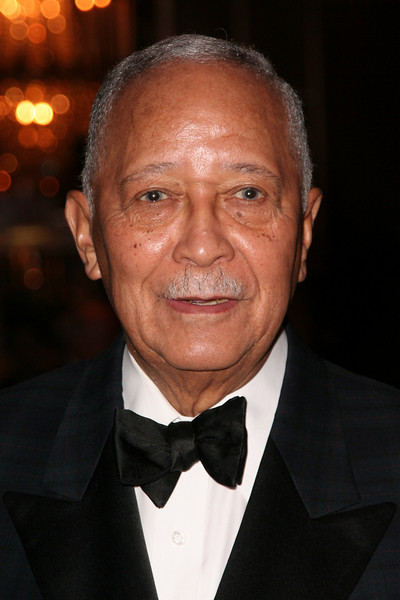
David Dinkins

- July 1
  - Winfield Dunn, American politician (d. 2024)
  - Joseph Martin Sartoris, American Catholic prelate
- July 3 – Tim O'Connor, American actor (d. 2018)
- July 4 – Neil Simon, American playwright (d. 2018)
- July 5
  - Robert E. Jones, American politician and judge (d. 2025)
  - Thomas Fleming, American military historian, historical novelist (d. 2017)
- July 6
  - Janet Leigh, American actress, singer, dancer, and author (d. 2004)
  - Pat Paulsen, American comedian and actor (d. 1997)
- July 7
  - Alan Dixon, American politician (d. 2014)
  - George C. Lodge, American politician
  - Charlie Louvin, American country singer and songwriter (d. 2011)
  - Doc Severinsen, American jazz trumpeter
- July 9
  - Ed Ames, American singer and actor (Ames Brothers) (d. 2023)
  - Alma Carlisle, African-American architect and architectural historian
- July 10
  - David Dinkins, African-American politician (d. 2020)
  - Jack Kelley, American ice hockey coach (d. 2020)
- July 14 – Mike Esposito, American comic book artist (d. 2010)
- July 15 – Joe Turkel, actor (d. 2022)
- July 16
  - Mindy Carson, American singer
  - Jules Witcover, American journalist, author, and columnist
- July 18 – Don Bagley, American bassist Midge Decter (d. 2012)
- July 19
  - Tom Blake, American football player (d. 2020)
  - Billy Gardner, American professional baseball player, coach and manager (d. 2024)
- July 21
  - William Liller, American astronomer (d. 2021)
  - Dick Smith, American baseball player (d. 2021)
- July 24 – Alex Katz, American painter
- July 25 – Midge Decter, American journalist and author (d. 2022)
- July 27
  - Guy Carawan, American folk musician and musicologist (d. 2015)
  - Will Jordan, American character actor (d. 2018)
- July 28 – John Ashbery, American poet (d. 2017)

=== August ===
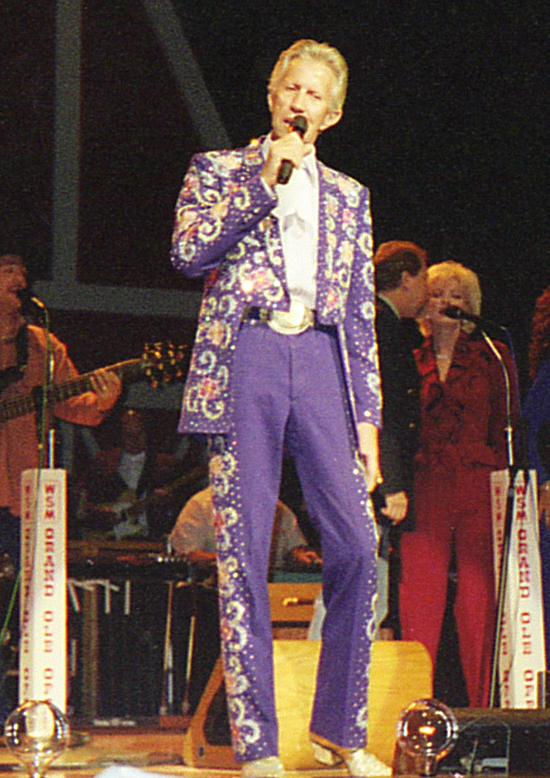
Porter Wagoner

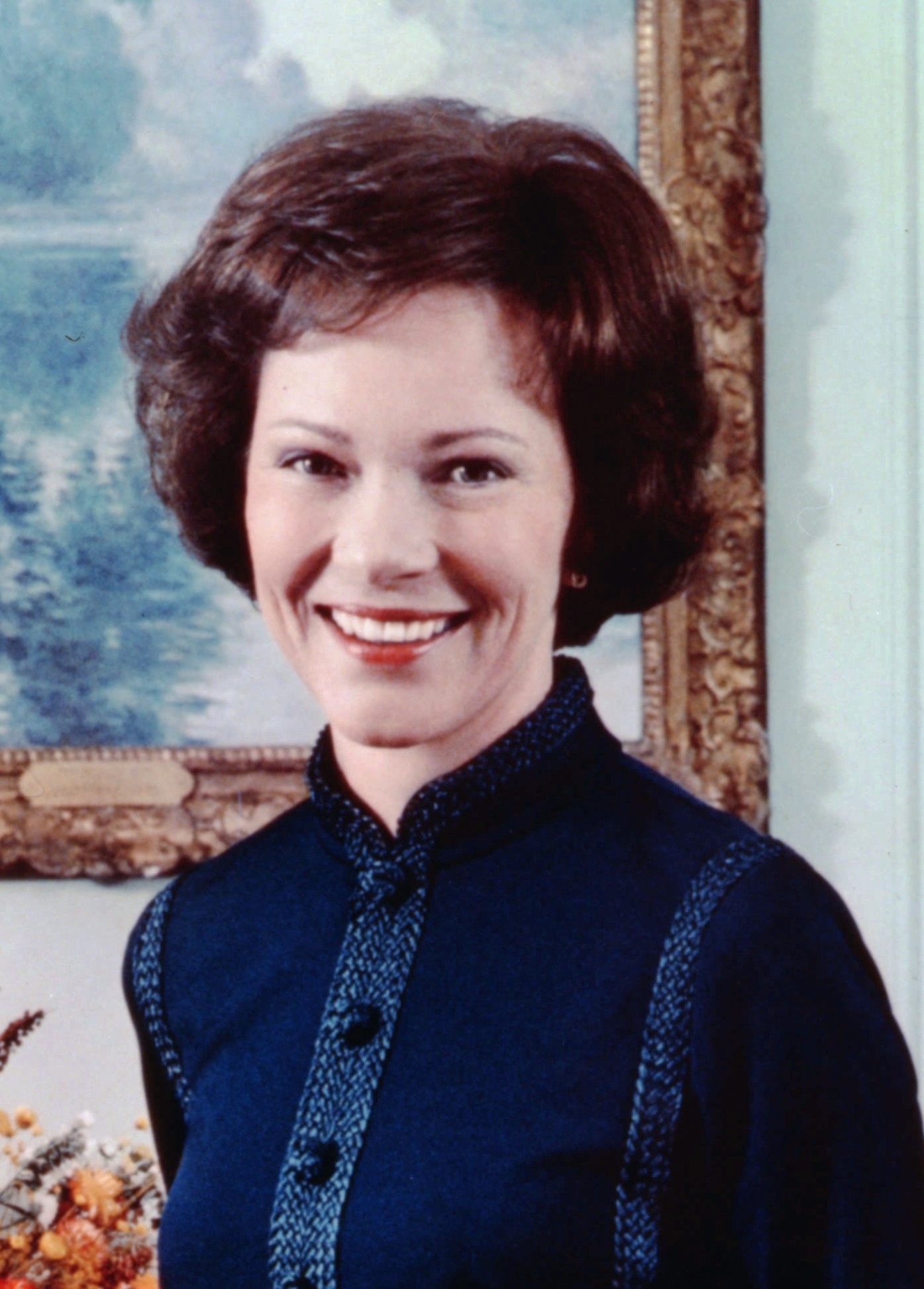
Rosalynn Carter

Althea Gibson

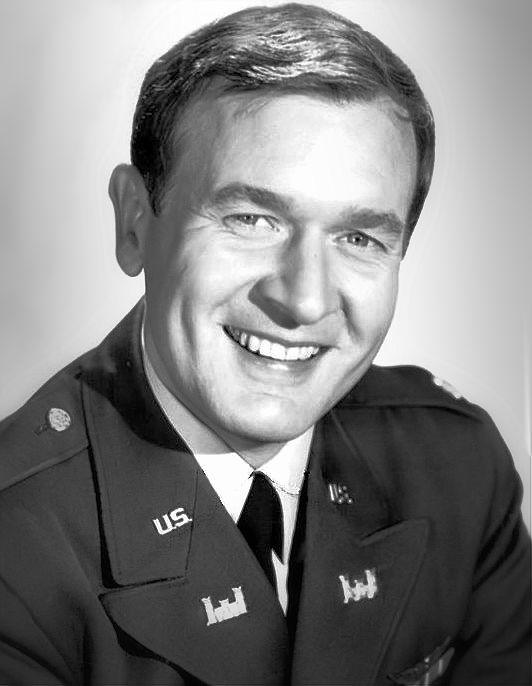
Bill Daily

- August 1 – Warren Wolf, American football player (d. 2019)
- August 4
  - Eddie Kamae, American ukuleleist (d. 2017)
  - Johnny Maddox, American pianist (d. 2018)
  - Del Shankel, American microbiologist, academic administrator (d. 2018)
  - Jess Thomas, American tenor (d. 1993)
- August 5 – James Timlin, American Roman Catholic prelate (d. 2023)
- August 6 – William D. Ford, American politician (d. 2004)
- August 7
  - Rocky Bridges, American middle infielder, third baseman (d. 2015)
  - Edwin W. Edwards, American politician (d. 2021)
  - Art Houtteman, American baseball player (d. 2003)
  - Carl Switzer, American actor (d. 1959)
- August 8
  - Johnny Temple, American baseball player (d. 1994)
  - Jim Weaver, American politician (d. 2020)
- August 9 – Marvin Minsky, American computer scientist (d. 2016)
- August 10 – W. Sterling Cary, African-American Christian minister (d. 2021)
- August 11 – Stuart Rosenberg, American director (d. 2007)
- August 12
  - Elgen Long, American aviator, world record holder, author (d. 2022)
  - Porter Wagoner, American country singer (d. 2007)
- August 15 – Carmela Marie Cristiano, American Roman Catholic nun (d. 2011)
- August 17 – F. Ray Keyser Jr., American lawyer, politician (d. 2015)
- August 18 – Rosalynn Carter, 39th First Lady of the United States (d. 2023)
- August 19
  - Jim Broyhill, American politician (d. 2023)
  - L. Q. Jones, American actor (d. 2022)
- August 21 – Thomas S. Monson, American religious leader, 16th president of the Church of Jesus Christ of Latter-day Saints (d. 2018)
- August 23 – Allan Kaprow, American painter and performance artist (d. 2006)
- August 24 – Harry Markowitz, American economist (d. 2023)
- August 25 – Althea Gibson, African-American tennis player (d. 2003)
- August 26 – Sam Massell, American businessman (d. 2022)
- August 29
  - A. Ross Eckler Jr., American logologist, statistician and author (d. 2016)
  - Jimmy C. Newman, American country singer-songwriter (d. 2014)
- August 30
  - William G. Curlin, American Roman Catholic prelate (d. 2017)
  - Bill Daily, American actor and comedian (d. 2018)
  - Buford A. Johnson, African-American World War II pilot (d. 2017)

=== September ===
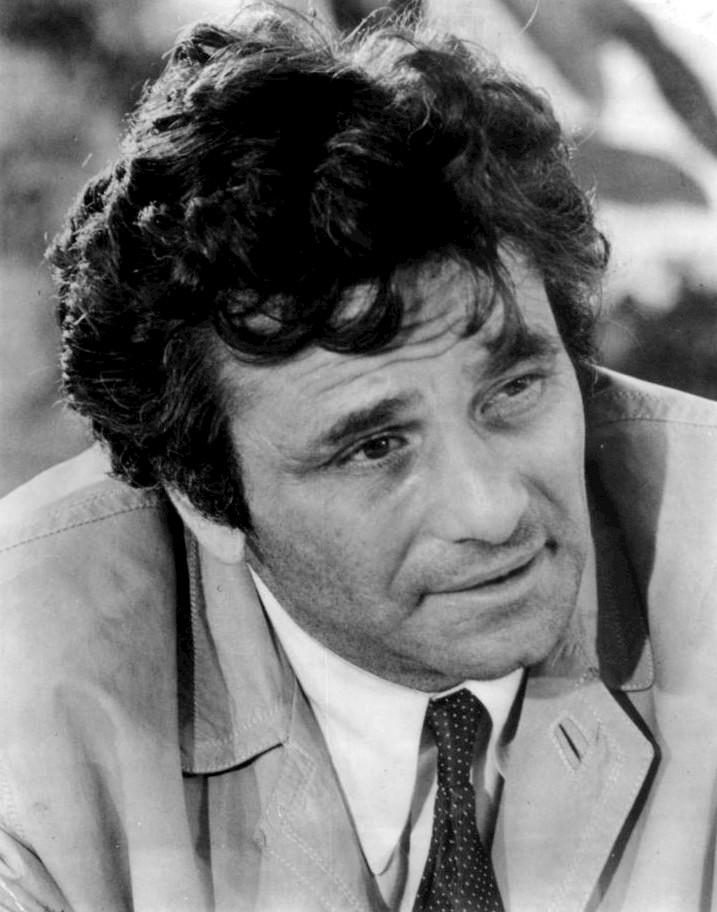
Peter Falk

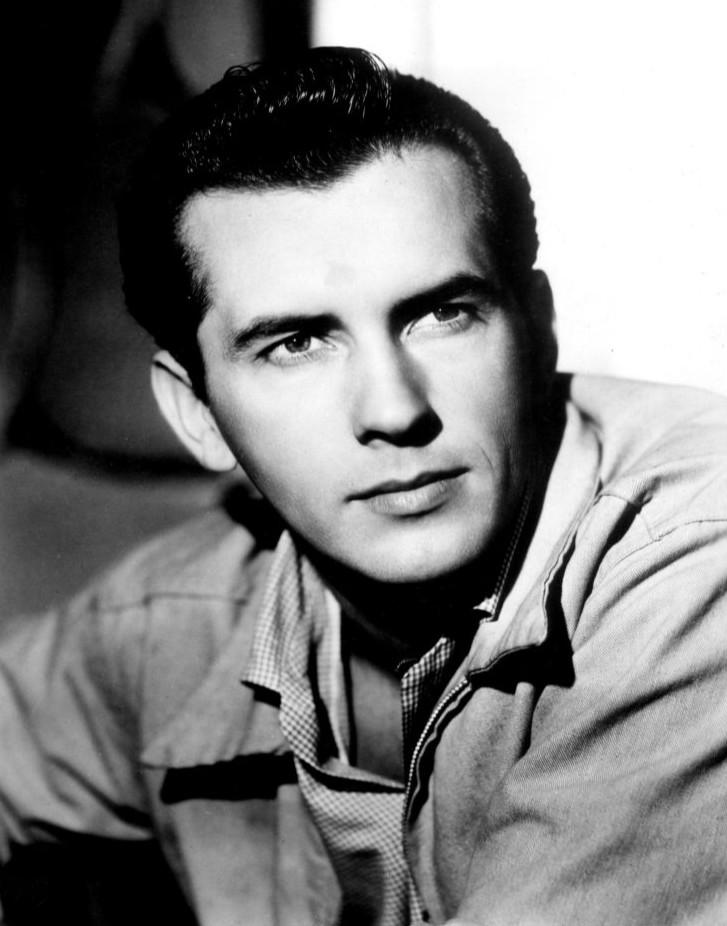
Jack Kelly

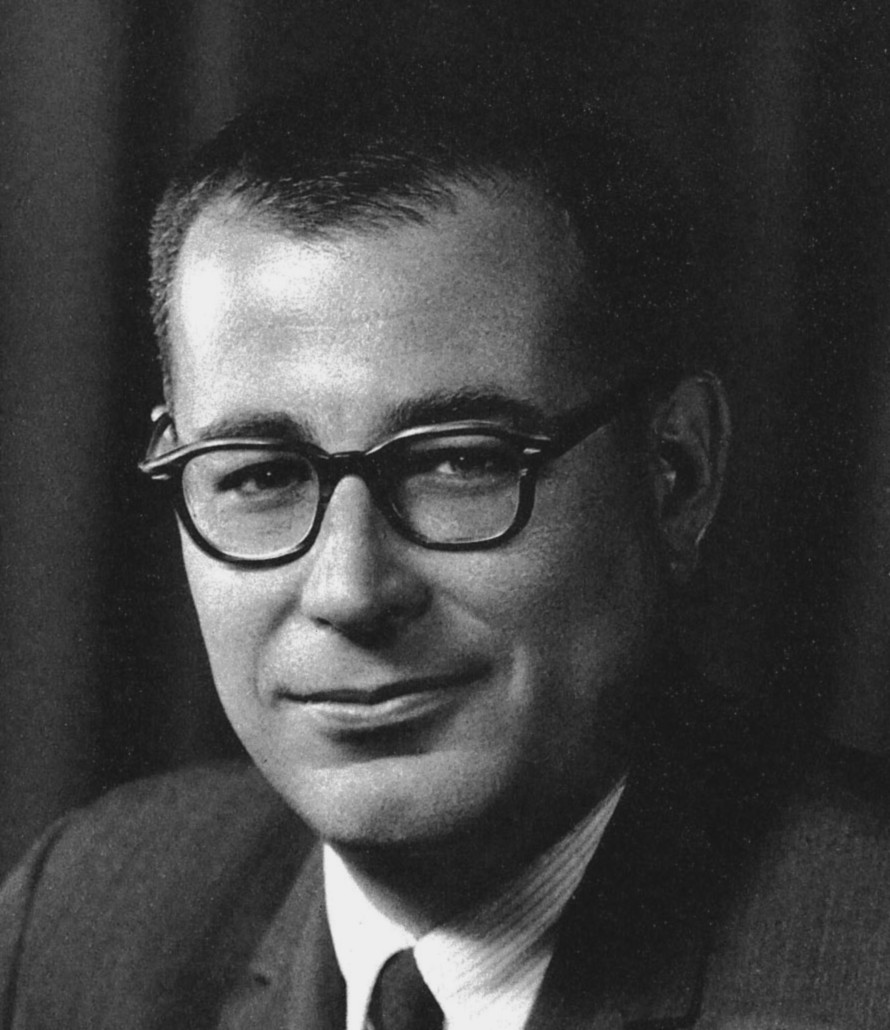
Harold Brown

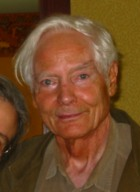
W. S. Merwin

- September 1 – Bob DiPietro, baseball player (d. 2012)
- September 2 – Gene Rhodes, basketball player and coach (d. 2018)
- September 3
  - Robert J. Birnbaum, finance executive, president of the New York Stock Exchange (d. 2021)
  - John Hamman, close-up magician, inventor, Marianist brother (d. 2000)
  - Wayne Peterson, composer (d. 2021)
- September 4 – John McCarthy, computer and cognitive scientist (d. 2011)
- September 5 – Paul Volcker, economist and academic (d. 2019)
- September 8
  - Marguerite Frank, American-French mathematician (d. 2024)
  - Harlan Howard, country singer and songwriter (d. 2002)
- September 9 – Elvin Jones, African-American jazz drummer (d. 2004)
- September 11
  - Christine King Farris, African-American civil rights activist (d. 2023)
  - G. David Schine, businessman (d. 1996)
- September 15
  - Norm Crosby, comedian (d. 2020)
  - John M. Jacobus Jr., art historian (d. 2017)
  - Margaret Keane, artist (d. 2022)
- September 16
  - Peter Falk, actor (d. 2011)
  - Jack Kelly, actor (d. 1992)
- September 17 – George Blanda, American football quarterback, placekicker (d. 2010)
- September 19
  - Harold Brown, nuclear physicist, 14th United States Secretary of Defense (d. 2019)
  - William Hickey, actor (d. 1997)
  - Nick Massi, bassist for 'The Four Seasons' (d. 2000)
- September 21
  - Owen Aspinall, attorney and politician (d. 1997)
  - Joan Hotchkis, actress, writer and performance artist (d. 2022)
- September 22
  - Kika de la Garza, politician (d. 2017)
  - Tommy Lasorda, baseball manager (d. 2021)
- September 23 – Thomas Vose Daily, Roman Catholic prelate (d. 2017
  - Carl Braun, basketball player and coach (d. 2010)
- September 28
  - Paul L. Brady, civil rights advocate, author and federal judge
  - James Lyons, admiral (d. 2018)
  - James W. Symington, politician
- September 29 – Pete McCloskey, politician (d. 2024)
- September 30 – W. S. Merwin, poet (d. 2019)

=== October ===
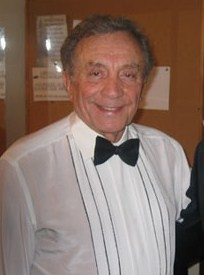
Al Martino

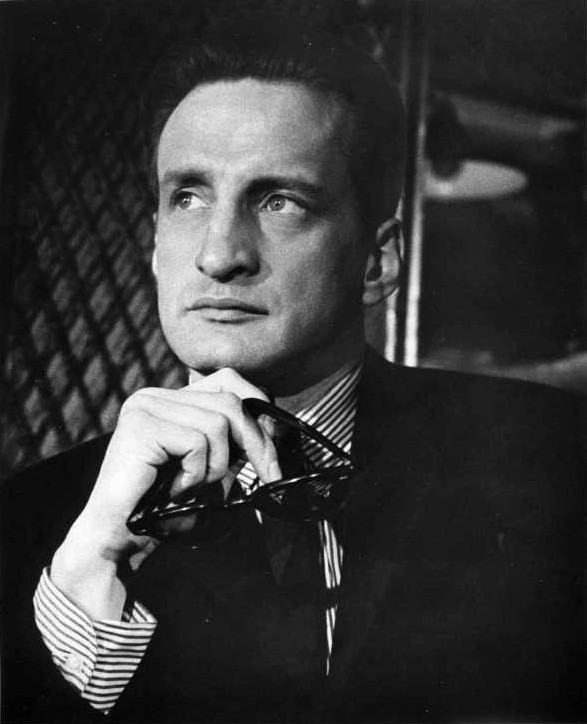
George C. Scott

- October 1 – Tom Bosley, American actor (d. 2010)
- October 5
  - John W. Downey, American composer, conductor, pianist and educator (d. 2004)
  - Al Hansen, American artist (d. 1995)
- October 6 – Alice Bauer, American golfer (d. 2002)
- October 7
  - James Bishop, American artist (d. 2021)
  - Al Martino, American singer and actor (d. 2009)
- October 10 – Dana Elcar, American actor, director (d. 2005)
- October 11 – William J. Perry, American mathematician, engineer and businessman
- October 13
  - Anita Kerr, American singer and arranger (d. 2022)
  - Lee Konitz, American jazz composer, alto saxophonist (d. 2020)
- October 18 – George C. Scott, American actor (d. 1999)
- October 19 – Red McCombs, American billionaire (d. 2023)
- October 20 – Joyce Brothers, American psychologist (d. 2013)
- October 21 – Fran Landesman, American lyricist and poet (d. 2011)
- October 23 – Barron Hilton, American socialite and businessman (d. 2019)
- October 24
  - Cal Hogue, American baseball player (d. 2005)
  - Paul Roach, American football player (d. 2023)
- October 25
  - William Acker, American judge (d. 2018)
  - Barbara Cook, American soprano musical singer (d. 2017)
- October 27 – Dominick Argento, American composer and educator (d. 2019)
- October 29 – William Cousins, American judge (d. 2018)

=== November ===
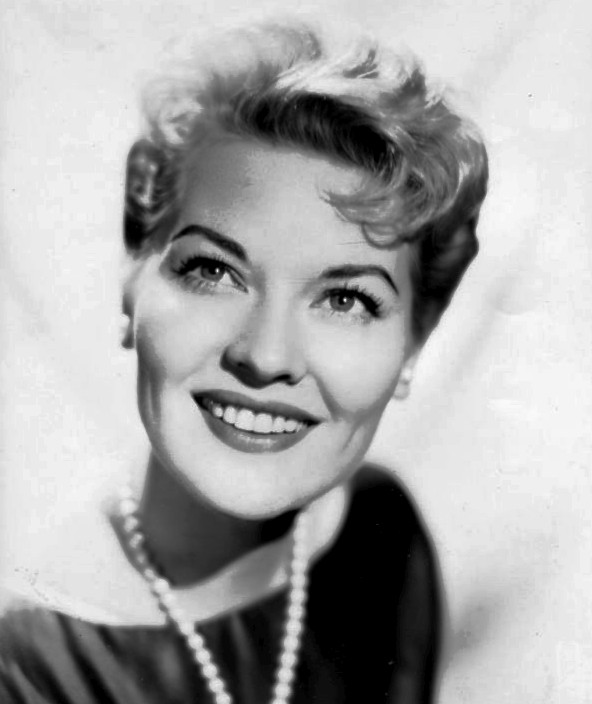
Patti Page

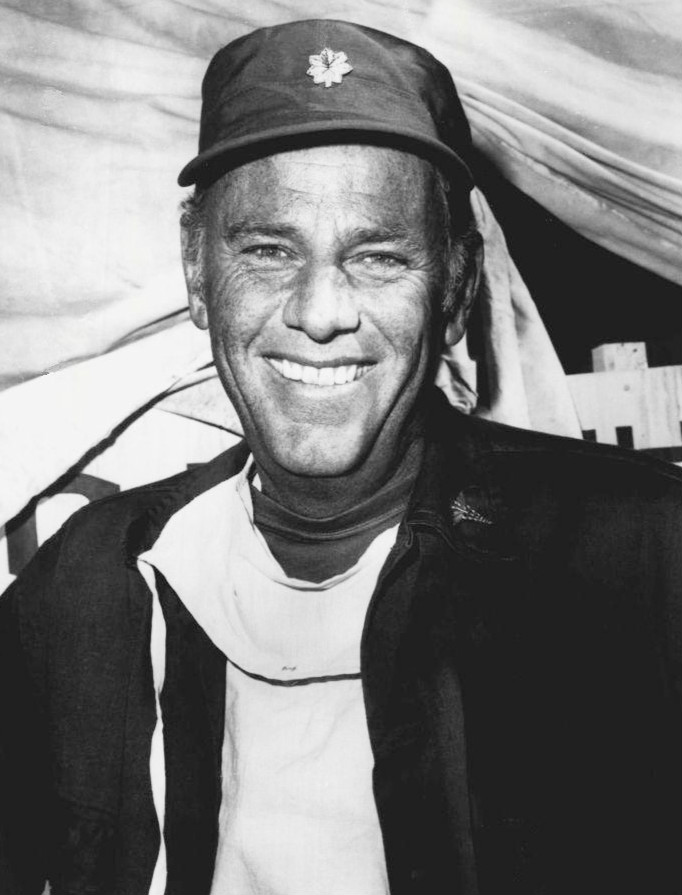
McLean Stevenson

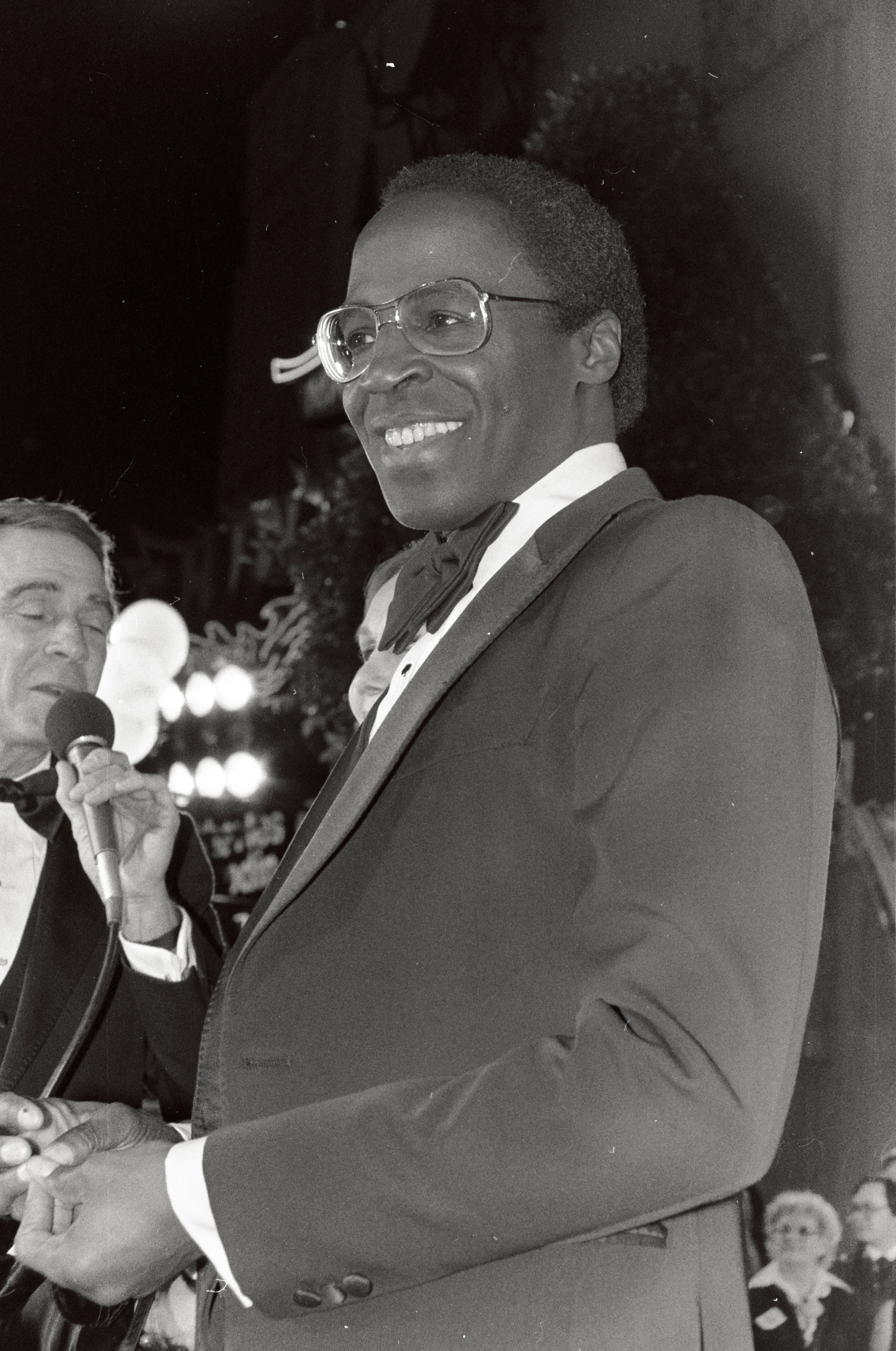
Robert Guillaume

- November 2 – Steve Ditko, American comic book artist (d. 2018)
- November 3 – Peggy McCay, American actress (d. 2018)
- November 5 – Howard Terpning, American painter and illustrator
- November 7 – Robert Wahl, American football player (d. 2023)
- November 8 – Patti Page, American singer (d. 2013)
- November 11 – Mose Allison, American jazz and blues pianist and singer-songwriter (d. 2016)
- November 12 – Jack Butler, American football player (d. 2013)
- November 13 – John Pont, American football player and coach (d. 2008)
- November 14
  - Betty Brewer, American actress (d. 2006)
  - McLean Stevenson, American actor (M*A*S*H) (d. 1996)
- November 16 – Barbara Payton, American actress (d. 1967)
- November 17
  - Betty Halbreich, American personal shopper (d. 2024)
  - Lynn Stalmaster, American casting director (d. 2021)
- November 18
  - Hank Ballard, American musician (d. 2003)
  - Lawrence Moss, American composer (d. 2022)
- November 19 – John Hulett, African American civil rights activist (d. 2006)
- November 20 – Estelle Parsons, American actress
- November 21
  - Georgia Frontiere, American co-owner of the Los Angeles/St. Louis Rams (d. 2008)
  - Gordon Christian, American ice hockey player (d. 2017)
- November 23 – Guy Davenport, American writer and graphic artist (d. 2005)
- November 26
  - John Carter, American actor (d. 2015)
  - Ernie Coombs, American-Canadian entertainer (d. 2001)
- November 27
  - William E. Simon, American businessman, 63rd Secretary of the Treasury (d. 2000)
  - José de Jesús Madera Uribe, American Roman Catholic bishop (d. 2017)
- November 29
  - Rupert Crosse, African-American actor (d. 1973)
  - Vin Scully, American sportscaster (d. 2022)
- November 30 – Robert Guillaume, African-American actor and singer (d. 2017)

=== December ===
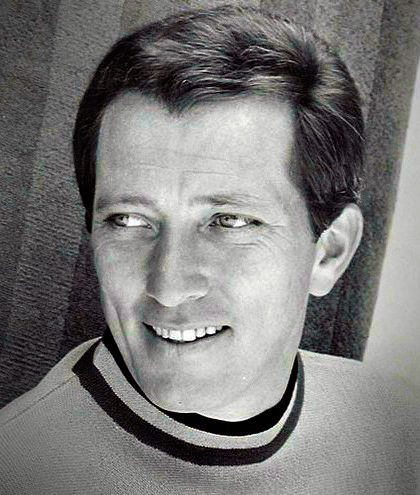
Andy Williams

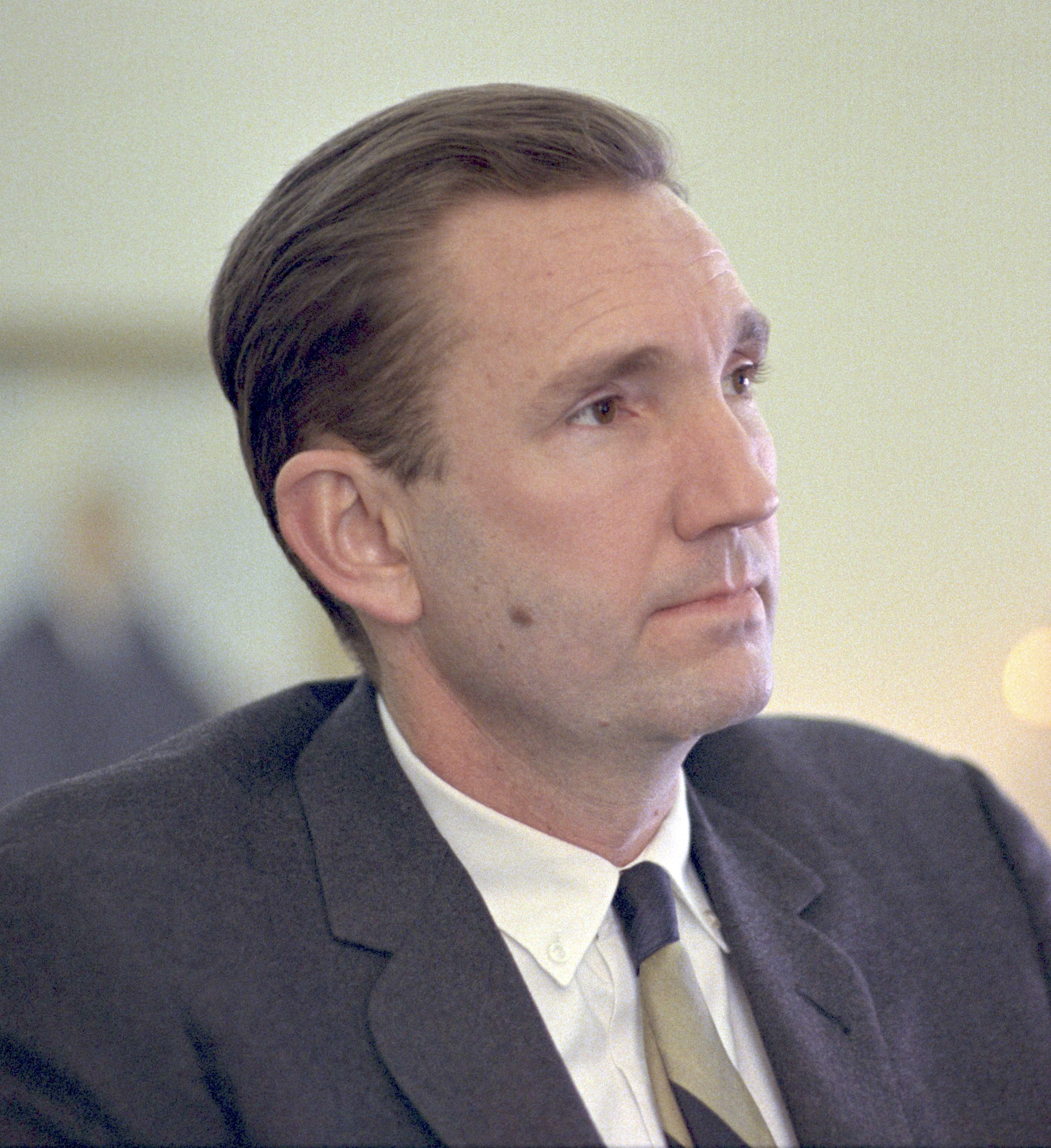
Ramsey Clark

- December 3 – Andy Williams, American singer (d. 2012)
- December 6 – Tommy Brown, American baseball player (d. 2025)
- December 8 – Ferdie Pacheco, American physician and author (d. 2017)
- December 10 – Bob Farrell, American motivational speaker, author and restaurant founder (d. 2015)
- December 12 – Robert Noyce, American co-founder of Intel (d. 1990)
- December 13 – James Wright, American poet (d. 1980)
- December 14 – Hershel McGriff, American stock car racing driver
- December 18 – Ramsey Clark, American politician, lawyer (d. 2021)
- December 20 – Charlie Callas, American comedian, singer (d. 2011)
- December 23 – Edith Irby Jones, African-American physician (d. 2019)
- December 24 – Mary Higgins Clark, American novelist (d. 2020)
- December 25
  - Nellie Fox, American baseball player (d. 1975)
  - Leo Kubiak, American basketball player
- December 26 – Alan King, American actor, comedian (d. 2004)
- December 27 – Genevieve Audrey Wagner, American professional baseball player, physician (d. 1984)
- December 29 – Andy Stanfield, American athlete (d. 1985)

== Deaths ==
- January 16 – Carl Theodore Vogelgesang, American admiral (b. 1869)
- January 26 – Lyman J. Gage, financier and presidential Cabinet officer (b. 1836)
- February 7 – Walter Guion, U.S. Senator from Louisiana in 1918 (b. 1849)
- February 13
  - Brooks Adams, historian (b. 1848)
  - Vive Lindaman, professional baseball player (b. 1877)
- February 20 – George McClellan, U.S. Representative from New York (b. 1856)
- February 25 – David Baird Sr., U.S. Senator from New Jersey from 1918 to 1919 (b. 1839 in Ireland)
- March 4 – Ira Remsen, chemist (b. 1846)
- March 6 – Annie Keeler, early woman physician (b. 1846)
- March 11 – August Paulsen, Danish-American businessman and philanthropist (b. 1871)
- April 25 – Earle Williams, actor (b. 1880)
- May 2 – Katherine Corri Harris, socialite and actress, first wife of John Barrymore (b. 1890)
- May 6 – Hudson Maxim, inventor and chemist (b. 1853)
- May 17 – Harold Geiger, aviation pioneer (b. 1884)
- May 23 – Henry E. Huntington, railroad magnate (b. 1850)
- June 1 – Lizzie Borden, murder suspect (b. 1860)
- June 9 – Victoria Woodhull, American leader of the woman's suffrage movement (b. 1838)
- June 15 – William Joseph Deboe, U.S. Senator from Kentucky from 1897 to 1903 (b. 1849)
- July 17 – Florence Roberts, actress (b. 1871)
- August 15 – B. B. Comer, 33rd Governor of Alabama from 1907 to 1911 and U.S. Senator from Alabama in 1920 (b. 1848)
- September 6 – Lloyd W. Bertaud, aviator (b. 1895)
- September 7 – Mary Canfield Ballard, poet and hymn-writer (b. 1852)
- September 14 – Isadora Duncan American-born dancer and choreographer (b. 1878)
- September 20 – George Nichols, American actor and director (b. 1864)
- September 27 – Leopold Wharton, film director (b. 1870)
- September 30 – Charles Kilpatrick, one-legged trick cyclist (b. 1869)
- October 21 – William Bromwell Melish, business president and Freemason leader.
- November 18 – Emma Carus, operatic contralto (b. 1879)
- December 3 – Orrin Dubbs Bleakley, U.S. House of Representatives from Pennsylvania (b. 1854)
- December 18 – Nicholas Fessenden, politician (b. 1847)

== See also ==
- 1927 in American television
- List of American films of 1927
- Timeline of United States history (1900–1929)
