= 1926 Alabama gubernatorial election =

- November 2, 1926
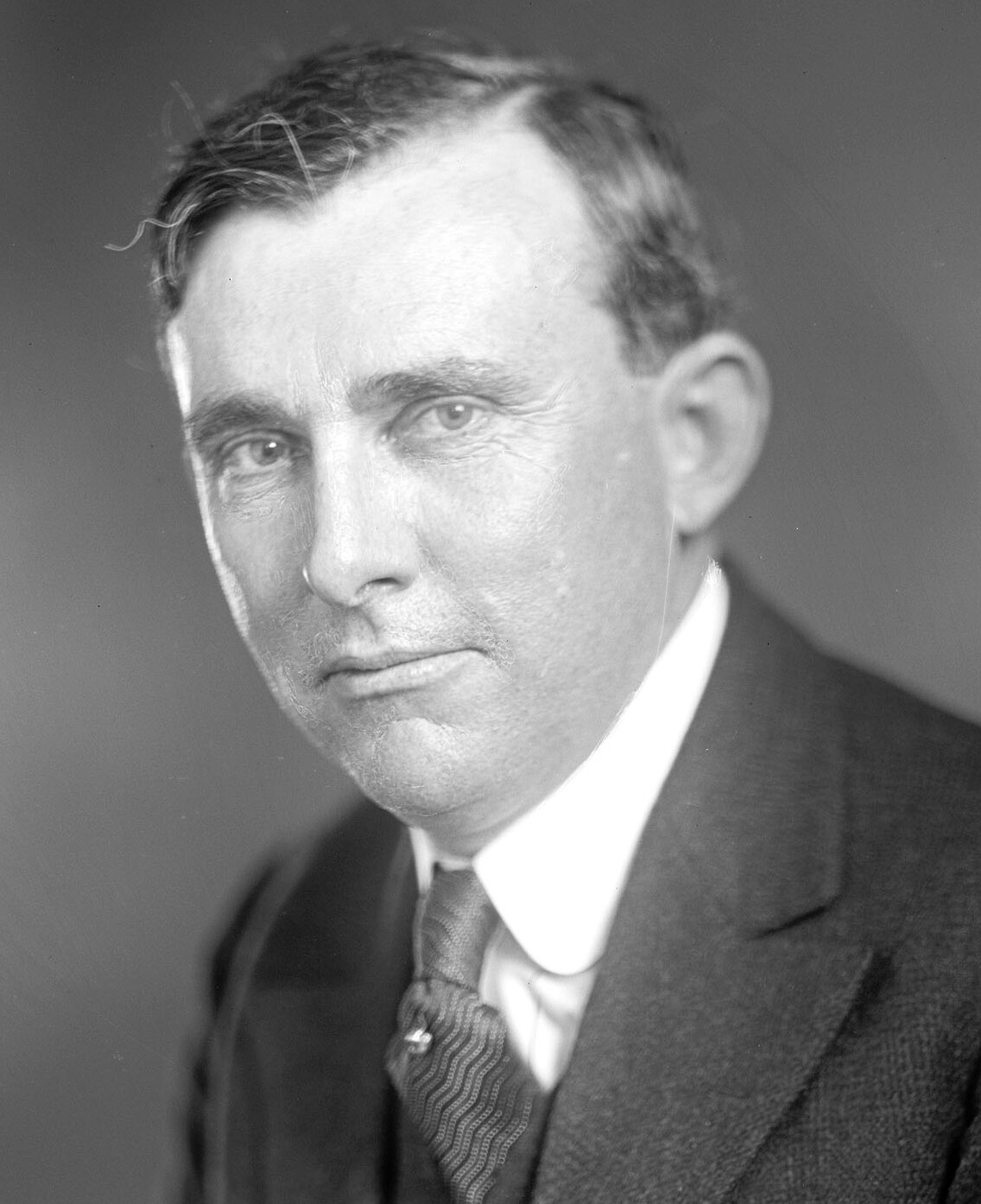

Nominee	Bibb Graves	J. A. Bingham
Party	Democratic	Republican
Popular vote	93,432	21,605
Percentage	81.22%	18.78%
- County results Graves: 50–60% 60–70% 70–80% 80–90% >90% Bingham: 50–60%
Governor before election
William W. Brandon
Democratic
Elected Governor
Bibb Graves
Democratic

The 1926 Alabama gubernatorial election took place on November 2, 1926, in order to elect the governor of Alabama. Democratic incumbent William W. Brandon was term-limited, and could not seek a second consecutive term.

== Democratic primary ==
At the time this election took place, Alabama, as with most other southern states, was solidly Democratic, and the Republican Party had such diminished influence that the Democratic primary was the de facto contest for state offices; after winning the Democratic primary it was a given you would win the general election.

=== Candidates ===
- Archibald Hill Carmichael, former state senator
- Bibb Graves, candidate for governor in 1922
- Charles S. McDowell, lieutenant governor

=== Results ===
Until 1931, the Alabama Democratic Party used the supplementary vote (called the "second choice" system) to decide primary elections.

1926 Alabama Democratic gubernatorial primary
Party	Candidate	1st round		2nd round			1st round votesTransfer votes, 2nd round
Party	Candidate	Total	Of round	Transfers	Total	Of round	1st round votesTransfer votes, 2nd round
Democratic	Bibb Graves	61,493	27.62%	21,978	83,471	55.25%	
Democratic	Charles S. McDowell	59,669	26.80%	7,943	67,612	44.75%	
Democratic	Archibald Hill Carmichael	54,072	24.29%				
Democratic	A. G. Patterson	47,411	21.29%				

== Results ==
1926 Alabama gubernatorial election
Party	Candidate	Votes	%
Democratic	Bibb Graves	93,432	81.22
Republican	J. A. Bingham	21,605	18.78
Total votes		115,037	100.00
Democratic hold			
