= Governor McDowell =

Governor McDowell may refer to:

- Charles S. McDowell (1871–1943), Acting Governor of Alabama in 1924
- James McDowell (1795–1851), 29th Governor of Virginia
