= Governor Brandon =

Governor Brandon may refer to:

- Gerard Brandon (1788–1850), 4th and 6th Governor of Mississippi
- William W. Brandon (1868–1934), 37th Governor of Alabama
