= 1918 Alabama gubernatorial election =

- November 2, 1918
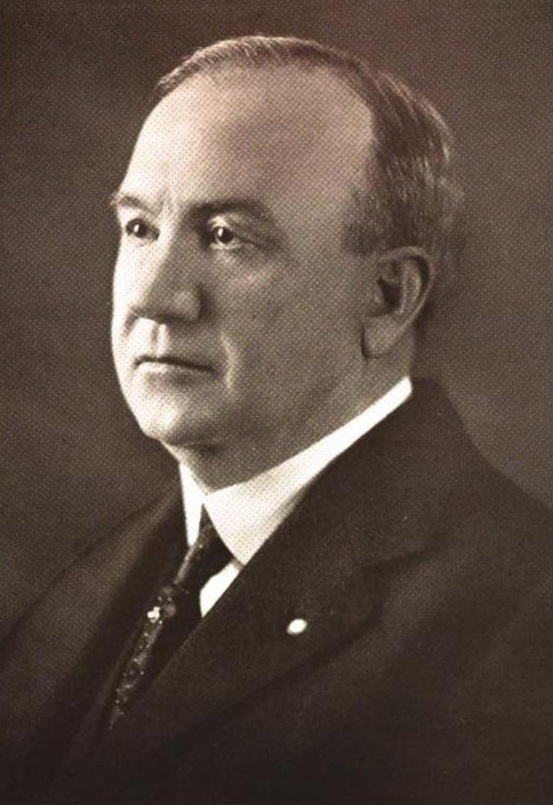

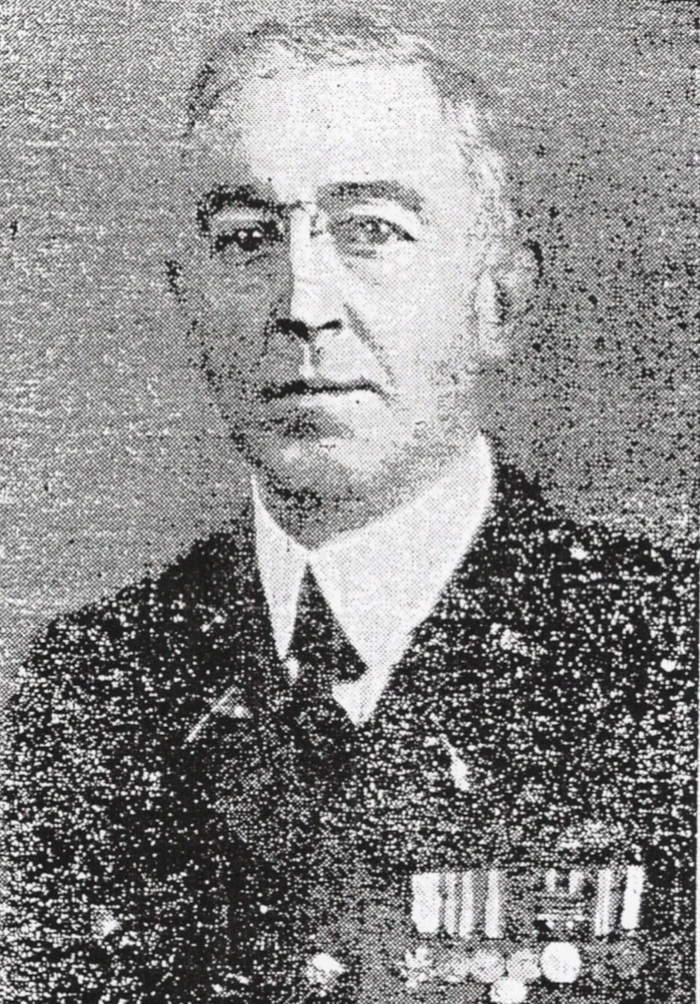
Nominee	Thomas Kilby	Dallas B. Smith
Party	Democratic	Independent
Popular vote	54,716	13,497
Percentage	80.21%	19.79%
- County results Kilby: 50–60% 60–70% 70–80% 80–90% >90% Smith: 60–70%
Governor before election
Charles Henderson
Democratic
Elected Governor
Thomas Kilby
Democratic

The 1918 Alabama gubernatorial election took place on November 2, 1918, to elect the governor of Alabama. Democratic incumbent Charles Henderson was term-limited, and could not seek a second consecutive term.

== Democratic primary ==
Until 1931, the Alabama Democratic Party used the supplementary vote (called the "second choice" system) to decide primary elections.

=== Candidates ===
- William W. Brandon, probate judge of Tuscaloosa County (1911–1923) and former State Auditor of Alabama
- Thomas Kilby, 8th Lieutenant Governor of Alabama (1915–1919) and former state senator from the 7th district
- John Purifoy, 29th Secretary of State of Alabama (1915–1919), 20th Alabama State Treasurer (1911–1915), and former State Auditor of Alabama (1892–1896)
- Charles B. Teasley, judge
- John H. Wallace Jr.

=== Results ===
1918 Alabama Democratic gubernatorial primary
Party	Candidate	1st round		2nd round			1st round votesTransfer votes, 2nd round
Party	Candidate	Total	Of round	Transfers	Total	Of round	1st round votesTransfer votes, 2nd round
Democratic	Thomas Kilby	48,896	42.85%	1,801	50,697	51.74%	
Democratic	William W. Brandon	38,414	33.66%	8,879	47,293	48.26%	
Democratic	Charles B. Teasley	18,064	15.83%				
Democratic	John H. Wallace Jr.	7,581	6.64%				
Democratic	John Purifoy	1,168	1.02%				

== Results ==
1918 Alabama gubernatorial election
Party	Candidate	Votes	%
Democratic	Thomas Kilby	54,716	80.21
Independent	Dallas B. Smith	13,497	19.79
Total votes		68,213	100.00
Democratic hold			
