= 1922 Alabama gubernatorial election =

- November 7, 1922
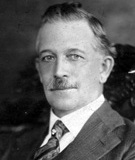

Nominee	William W. Brandon	Oliver D. Street
Party	Democratic	Republican
Popular vote	113,605	31,175
Percentage	77.56%	21.28%
- County results Brandon: 50–60% 60–70% 70–80% 80–90% >90% Street: 50–60%
Governor before election
Thomas Kilby
Democratic
Elected Governor
William W. Brandon
Democratic

The 1922 Alabama gubernatorial election took place on November 7, 1922, in order to elect the governor of Alabama. Democratic incumbent Thomas Kilby was term-limited, and could not seek a second consecutive term.

== Democratic primary ==
At the time this election took place, Alabama, as with most other Southern states, was solidly Democratic, and the Republican Party had such diminished influence that the Democratic primary was the de facto contest for state offices; after winning the Democratic primary it was a given the parties candidate would win the general election.

=== Results ===
1922 Alabama Democratic gubernatorial primary
Party	Candidate	Votes	%
Democratic	William W. Brandon	163,217	78.71
Democratic	Bibb Graves	44,151	21.29
Total votes		207,368	100.00

== Results ==
1922 Alabama gubernatorial election
Party	Candidate	Votes	%
Democratic	William W. Brandon	113,605	77.56
Republican	Oliver D. Street	31,175	21.28
Socialist	Arlie Barber	1,697	1.16
Total votes		146,477	100.00
Democratic hold			
