= Nathan Lee Miller =

American politician and lawyer (1866–1933)

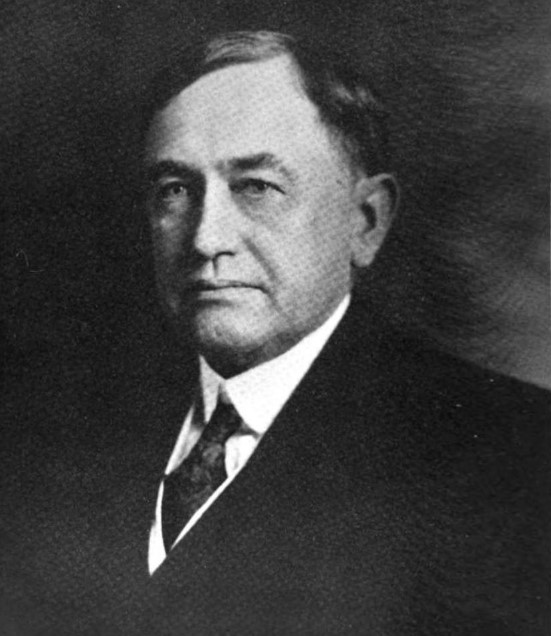
- Miller in 1927

9th Lieutenant Governor of Alabama
- In office January 20, 1919 – January 15, 1923
- Governor: Thomas E. Kilby
- Preceded by: Thomas E. Kilby
- Succeeded by: Charles S. McDowell

Member of the Alabama Senate
- In office 1907–1911

Personal details
- Born: March 6, 1866 Danville, Alabama, US
- Died: July 7, 1934 (aged 68) Birmingham, Alabama, US
- Resting place: Elmwood Cemetery
- Party: Democratic
- Occupation: Politician, lawyer

Nathan Lee Miller (March 6, 1866 – July 4, 1934) was an American politician and lawyer. A Democrat, he served as Lieutenant Governor of Alabama, under Thomas Kilby. Previously, he was a member of the Alabama Senate.

== Early life and education ==
Miller was born on March 6, 1866, in Danville, Alabama, the son of Nathan Miller Sr. and Elizabeth (née Torrence) Miller. An attendee of Danville High School, he studied at the University of North Alabama and at Bellevue Academy, the latter in Birmingham.

== Career ==
For two and a half years, Miller worked as a clerk for Jefferson County Courthouse, during which he studied law. He was admitted to the bar in December 1897, commencing the practice of law the following year, in Birmingham. In 1904, he formed the partnership Sharpe & Miller, with Henry A. Sharpe. From 1889 to 1891, he was a Lieutenant of the Alabama National Guard.

Miller was a Democrat. From 1890 to 1896, he was secretary of Jefferson County, and from 1894 to 1898, was secretary of the Alabama Democratic Executive Committee. He was also secretary of the Alabama Campaign Committee for some time. In 1916, he was elected to the Jefferson County board of education, later resigning.

From 1907 to 1911, Miller was a member of the Alabama Senate, during which he was chairman of the Committee on the Judiciary and vice-chairman of the Committee on Finance. He was Lieutenant Governor of Alabama from January 20, 1919, to January 15, 1923, serving under Thomas E. Kilby. After serving in Congress, he continued his practice of law as a member of Miller, Graham & Wingo. He was also president of the American Bolt Company and the Alabama Acceptance Company.

== Personal life and death ==
On February 8, 1899, Miller married Sarah Rogan; they conceived one child that died in the womb. He was a member of the Methodist Episcopal Church, South, as well as a member of the Knights of Pythias of the Freemasons. He died on July 7, 1934, aged 68, in Birmingham, and was buried at Elmwood Cemetery.

Political offices
Preceded by Thomas E. Kilby	Lieutenant Governor of Alabama; 1919–1923	Succeeded by Charles S. McDowell
