= Bibb Graves Bridge =

Bridge in Wetumpka, Alabama

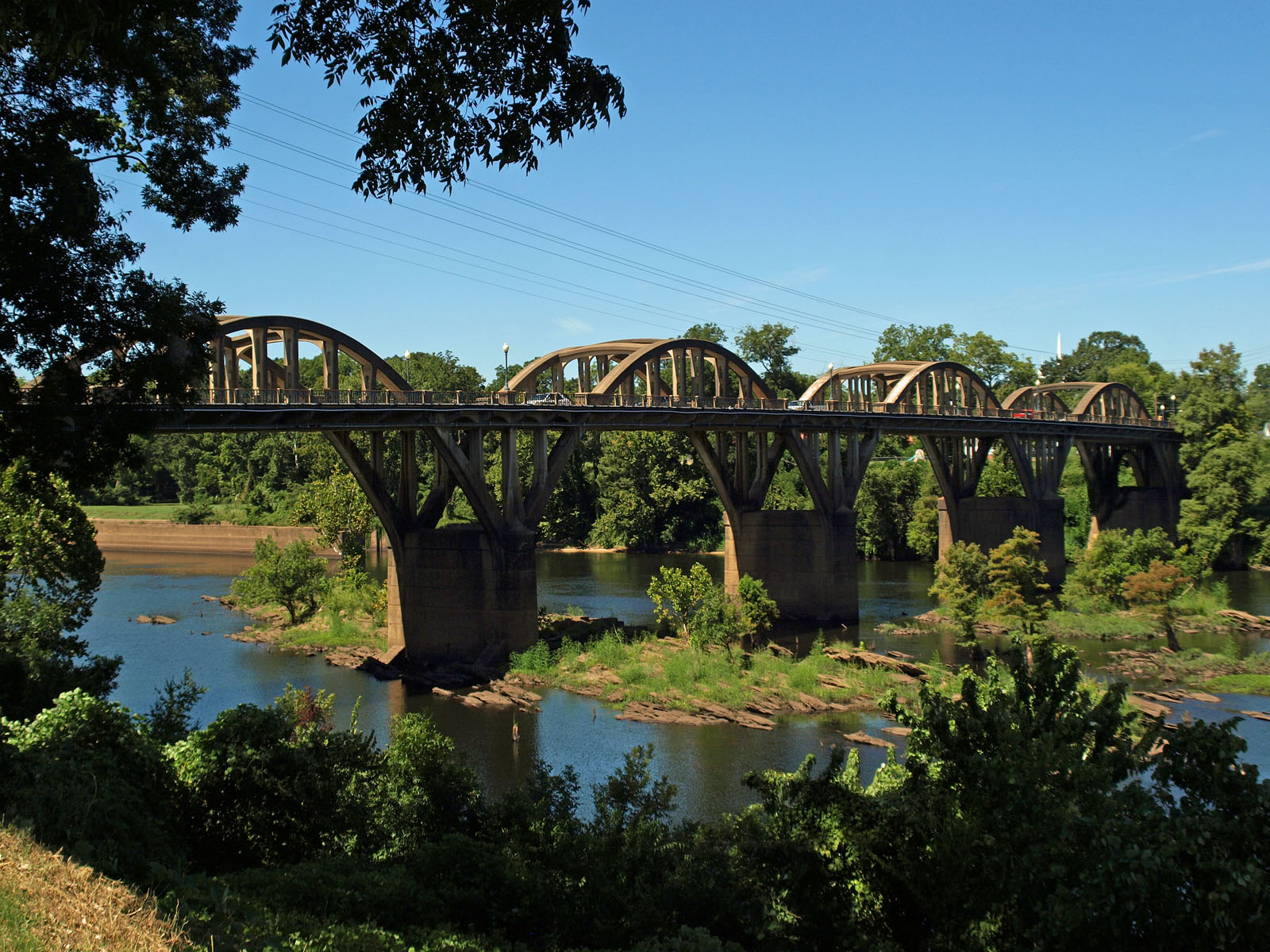
- Bibb Graves Bridge in September 2001
- Coordinates: 32°32′18″N 86°12′25″W
- Carries: AL-212 and AL-111 (Bridge Street)
- Crosses: Coosa River

Characteristics
- Design: Concrete Rainbow Through Arch
- Total length: 787.0 feet (239.9 m)
- Width: 26.6 feet (8.1 m)
- Longest span: 140.0 feet (42.7 m)
- No. of spans: 5 Main Spans and 2 Approach Spans

History
- Construction end: 1931

The Bibb Graves Bridge, also known as the Coosa River Bridge, is a "large multi-span rainbow arch bridge" located in Elmore County, Alabama, in downtown Wetumpka. The bridge crosses the Coosa River.

== History ==
The Bibb Graves Bridge, designed by state bridge engineer Edward Houk, was built in 1931 to help connect the two parts of Wetumpka, which are separated by the Coosa River. The bridge is one of two in the state of Alabama "to be suspended by reinforced concrete."

The bridge is named after David Bibb Graves, the 38th Governor of Alabama, serving from 1927–1931 and 1935–1939, becoming the first Alabama governor to serve two four-year terms.

Several scenes in the movie Big Fish were filmed on the Bibb Graves Bridge.

== Structure ==
The Bibb Graves Bridge is 140.1 feet in length and has 12.5 feet vertical clearance above deck. It supports pedestrian, motor vehicle, and bike traffic. The bridge contains five concrete arches, classifying it as an arch bridge.

Despite its age, the bridge maintains its integrity, though one "arch span is suffering from ASR cracking."
