= Bibb Graves =

American politician (1873–1942)

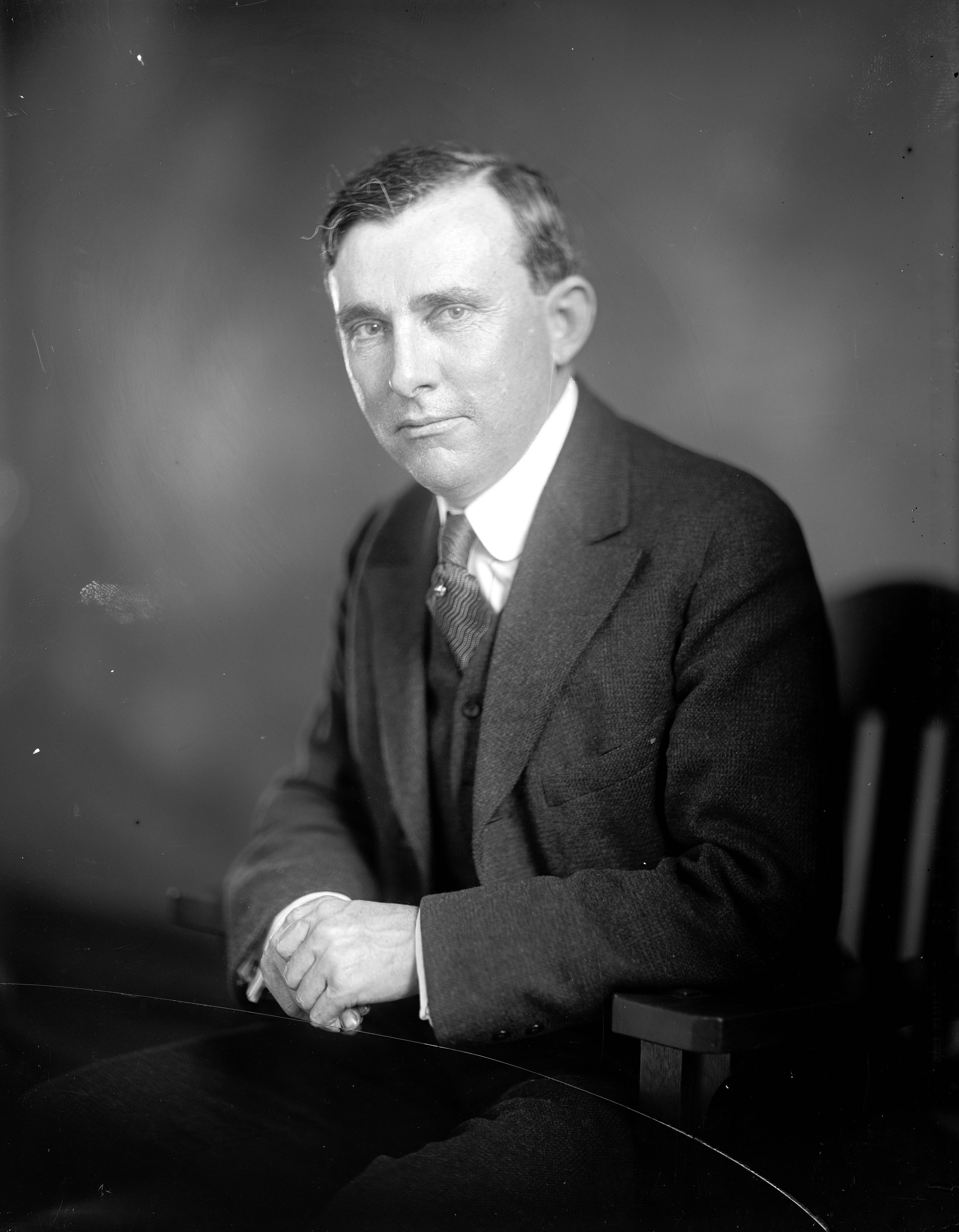

38th Governor of Alabama
- In office January 14, 1935 – January 17, 1939
- Lieutenant: Thomas E. Knight
- Preceded by: Benjamin M. Miller
- Succeeded by: Frank M. Dixon
- In office January 17, 1927 – January 19, 1931
- Lieutenant: William C. Davis
- Preceded by: William W. Brandon
- Succeeded by: Benjamin M. Miller

Personal details
- Born: April 1, 1873 Hope Hull, Alabama, U.S.
- Died: March 14, 1942 (aged 68) Sarasota, Florida, U.S.
- Resting place: Greenwood Cemetery, Montgomery, Alabama, U.S.
- Party: Democratic
- Spouse: Dixie Bibb Graves
- Education: University of Alabama, Yale Law School
- Profession: Teacher, lawyer

Military service
- Allegiance: United States
- Branch/service: United States Army
- Unit: Alabama National Guard; 1st Alabama Cavalry; 117th U.S. Field Artillery
- Battles/wars: World War I

David Bibb Graves (April 1, 1873 – March 14, 1942) was an American Democratic politician and the 38th governor of Alabama 1927–1931 and 1935–1939, the first Alabama governor to serve two four-year terms.

== Early & personal life ==
Graves was born April 1, 1873, in Hope Hull, Alabama, son of David and Mattie Bibb Graves and a descendant of Alabama's first and second governors, William Wyatt Bibb and Thomas Bibb. Graves' father died when he was one year old, and he was reared first by his paternal grandfather on an Alabama farm, then by an uncle in Texas.

After graduating from Yale Law School in 1896, Graves settled in Montgomery, Alabama, where he lived for the remainder of his life. There, he served as an elder of the Christian Church.

In 1900, Graves married Dixie Bibb, his first cousin, who eventually became Alabama's first female Senator.

He was also a founding member of Bob Jones College's Board of Trustees and a personal friend of the founder, evangelist Bob Jones, Sr.

Graves died in Sarasota, Florida while preparing for another gubernatorial campaign.

== Education ==
Graves attended public school in Texas before returning to his home state to attend the University of Alabama, where he studied Civil Engineering. There, he was a member of Phi Beta Kappa and the school's inaugural football team, as well as captain of the Alabama Corps of Cadets. He graduated in 1893, then briefly studied law at the University of Texas before transferring to Yale Law School, receiving a Bachelor of Laws degree in 1896.

== Career ==
After graduating from Yale Law School in 1896, Graves established a law practice in Montgomery, Alabama, where he later served as the city attorney.

=== Politics ===
Graves's political career began in 1898 when he was elected to the first of two terms as a member of the Alabama House of Representatives (1898–99, 1900–01). During this time, he aligned himself with governors Joseph F. Johnson and Braxton Bragg Comer. He also opposed ratifying the Alabama Constitution of 1901, which was "[w]ritten primarily to codify white supremacy by disfranchising blacks."

In 1904, Graves ran for Congress in Alabama's Second Congressional District but lost to the incumbent Democratic congressman, Ariosto A. Wiley. After the loss, although he refrained from running for a political position for a decade, he remained active in politics, "managing Comer's 1904 campaign ... and serving as chair of the State Democratic Executive Committee in 1914, during which time he helped write a new election law replacing runoff elections with a first- and second-choice option ballot system."

Graves lost his first campaign for governor in 1922, but four years later, with the secret endorsement of the Ku Klux Klan, he was elected to his first term as governor. Almost certainly Graves was the Exalted Cyclops (chapter president) of the Montgomery chapter of the Klan, but both Graves and U.S. Supreme Court justice Hugo Black, another Alabama Klan member, were more opportunists than ideologues, politicians who used the temporary strength of the Klan to further their careers. After receiving solid gold "passports" from the Klan, Graves and Black were collectively known in some Alabama circles as "The Gold Dust Twins."

As governor, Graves earned a reputation as a reformer, abolishing the convict leasing system and raising taxes on public utilities, railways, and coal and iron companies. The new revenue was used to expand educational and public health facilities, increase teachers' salaries and veterans' pensions, fund an ambitious road-building program, and improve port facilities in Mobile. "To maintain his popularity among the farmers in northern Alabama and the working classes, Graves made good on his commitment to New Deal legislation, winning a reputation as one of the most progressive governors in the South." In 1928 he hosted a delegation of British Parliament members, including Richard Briscoe, George Newton, 1st Baron Eltisley, Robert Bourne, Hugh Cecil, 1st Baron Quickswood, Charles Oman and Wilfrid Ashley, 1st Baron Mount Temple. Receiving these British leaders in Alabama was largely Graves' idea and was intended to improve diplomatic relations and economic ties between the United States and Great Britain.

During his second gubernatorial administration he supported Franklin D. Roosevelt's "court packing" plan and Hugo Black's nomination to the U.S. Supreme Court. In 1937, when Black's ties to the Klan were debated in Congress, Graves noted his own previous membership as well, a membership that had been publicly revealed when he resigned from the organization in 1928.

Graves appointed his wife, Dixie Bibb Graves, to serve the remainder of Black's term. She thus became Alabama's first woman U.S. senator.

Graves made many successful trips to Washington to secure funds for Alabama, which he called "plum-tree-shaking expeditions," and President Roosevelt appointed him to a national advisory committee on agriculture and to an inter-regional highway committee. Graves was a strong opponent of eugenic sterilization; and in 1938, he was on hand to greet 1,200 delegates to the founding session of the Southern Conference for Human Welfare, a meeting of southern liberals, who addressed labor relations, farm tenancy, the poll tax, and constitutional rights and who condemned "enforced segregation within Birmingham." A fourth of the delegates were black.

=== Military ===
As adjutant general of the Alabama National Guard, Graves helped organize the 1st Alabama Cavalry and served on the Mexican border in 1916. In World War I, Graves, as a colonel, commanded the 117th U.S. Field Artillery in France, and upon his return to Alabama, he helped organize the state's section of the American Legion.

== Legacy ==
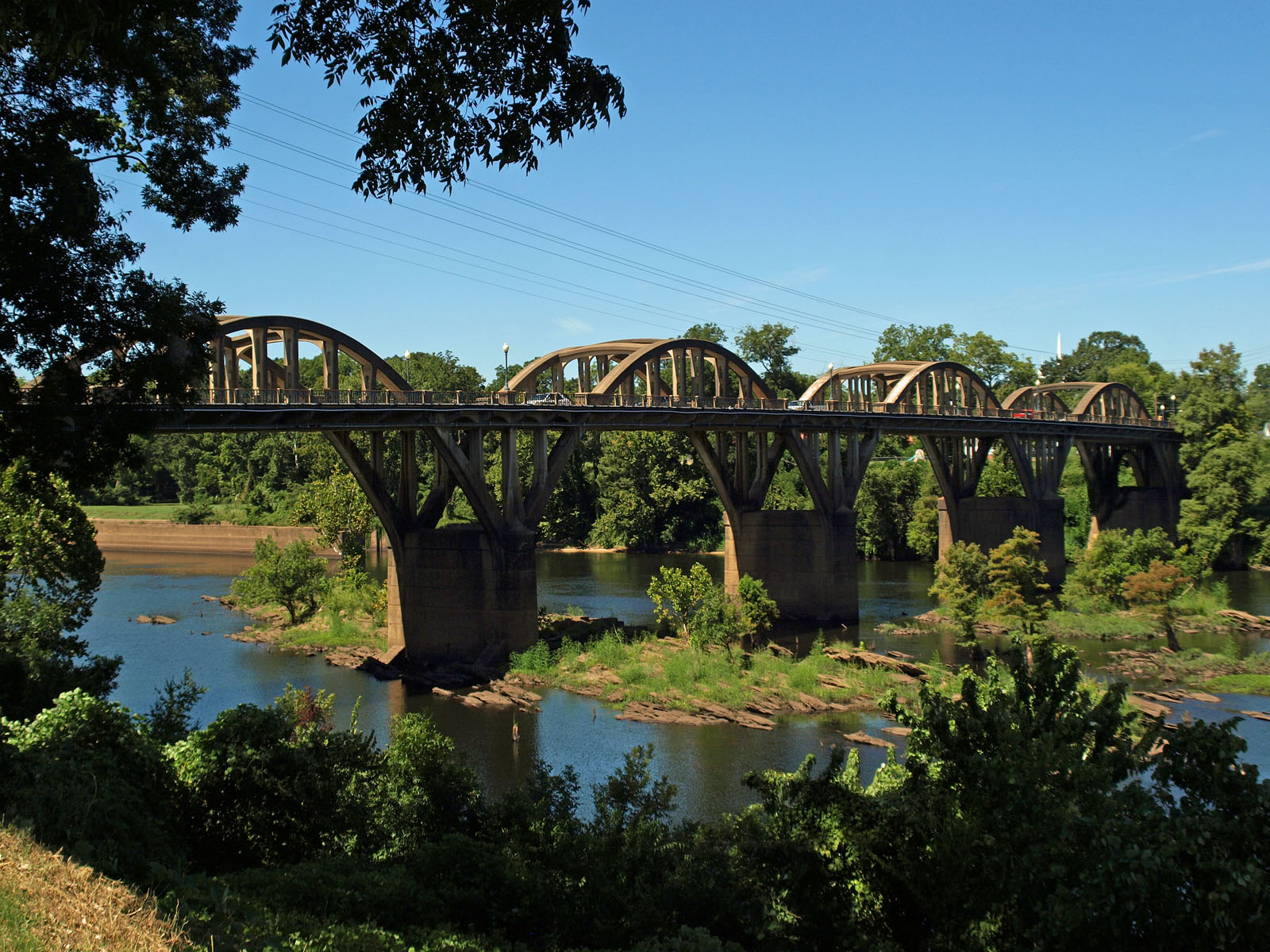
The Bibb Graves Bridge in Wetumpka, Alabama, September 2001

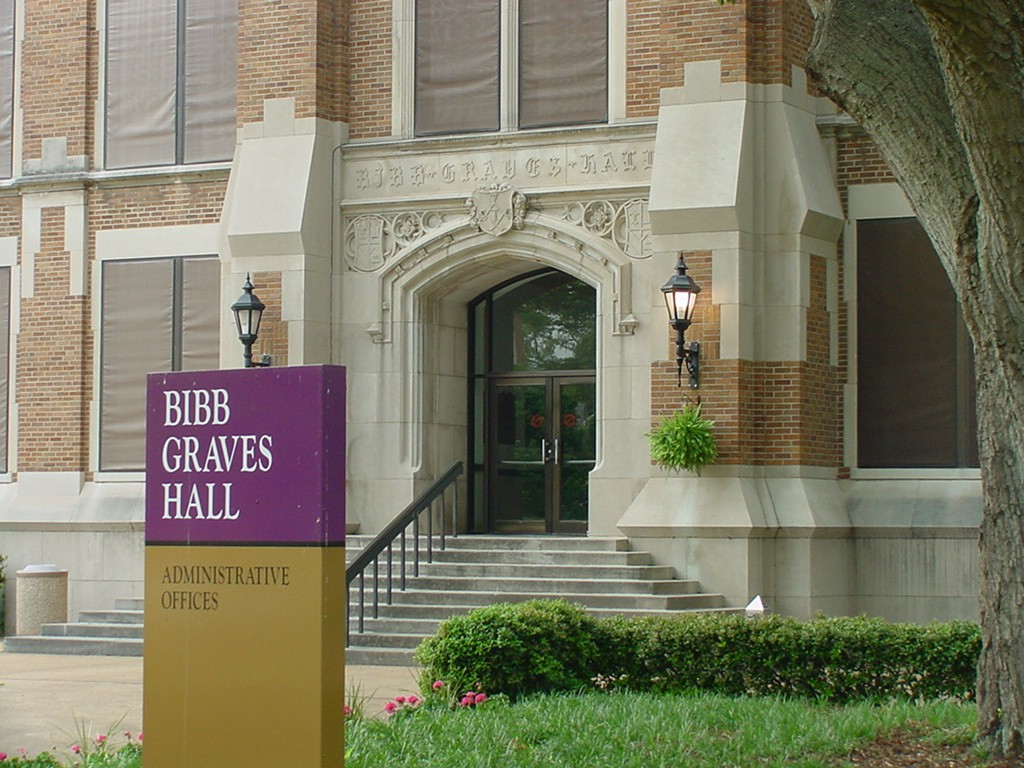
Bibb Graves Hall, the main administrative building at the University of North Alabama in Florence.

Graves has had multiple landmarks named after him, though since 2011, most have been renamed.

Currently, the University of Montevallo and University of North Alabama have Bibb Graves Halls, and Wetumpka, Alabama has a Bibb Graves Bridge, built in 1931. Auburn University had a Graves Center, which housed "a complex of thirty cottages, an amphitheatre, a large dining hall, and a brass bust of ... Bibb Graves." Graves Amphitheatre and Graves Drive are the two remaining artifacts.

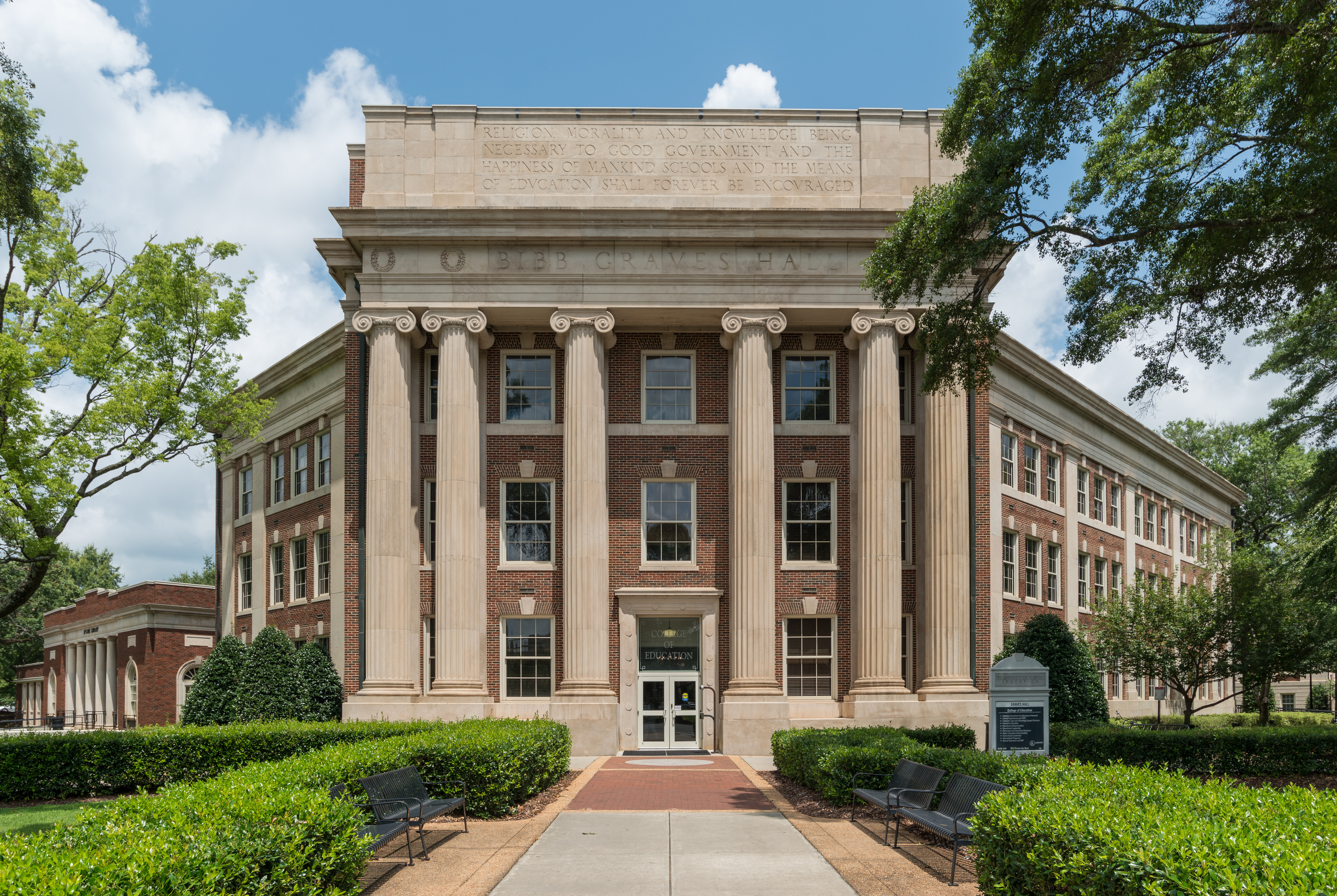
Bibb Graves Hall at the University of Alabama, renamed Autherine Lucy Hall in 2022

Because of Graves's connection to the Ku Klux Klan, several universities that once had buildings named for Graves have renamed them: Alabama A&M University, Alabama State University, Bob Jones University, Jacksonville State University, Troy University, and the University of Alabama.

Bibb Graves High School in Millerville, Clay County, Alabama, closed in 2004.

Bob Jones University was the first to remove Graves's name from a campus building, renaming a residence hall to honor Harry A. Ironside, a Canadian-American preacher, Bible teacher, theologian, and pastor of Moody Church in Chicago from 1929 to 1948.

Alabama A&M University and Alabama State University, both historically black universities, previously had buildings named after Graves, School of Social Work and Department of Criminal Justice and a women's dormitory, respectively. In 2020, both schools' Boards of Trustees voted to remove Graves's name from the buildings. The same year, Troy University opted to rename the former Bibb Graves Hall to honor U.S. Congressman and Civil Rights leader John Lewis.

In January 2021, Jacksonville State University's (JSU) administrative building, then named Bibb Graves Hall, was renamed by the Board of Trustees "to reflect a more unified campus that believes in social justice and equality." The building is now named Angle Hall to honor of Marcus E. Angle, Jr. and his wife, Mary, JSU alumni and benefactors.

On February 3, 2022, the University of Alabama announced they would be changing the name of Bibb Graves Hall, the building housing the College of Education, to Graves-Lucy Hall, honoring both Graves and Autherine Lucy, an activist and the first African-American to attend the university. The date of the announcement coincided with "the 66th anniversary of her enrollment." When Lucy attempted to attend classes on her first day, she was met with violent protest and took shelter in the Graves Hall Library. Shortly after, she was suspended, then expelled from the university. The decision to co-name the building after Graves and Lucy met with backlash, and on February 11, the Board of Trustees announced that the building would be solely named for Lucy.

Following protests, the University of North Alabama removed signage referring to Bibb Graves Hall in 2021, though it has yet to rename the building. The University of Montevallo has also stated that it intends to change the name of Bibb Graves Hall, though it will be a lengthy process due to the age of the building.

Party political offices
Preceded by William W. Brandon	Democratic nominee for Governor of Alabama; 1926	Succeeded by Benjamin M. Miller
Preceded by Benjamin M. Miller	Democratic nominee for Governor of Alabama; 1934	Succeeded by Frank M. Dixon
Political offices
Preceded by William W. Brandon	Governor of Alabama; 1927–1931	Succeeded by Benjamin M. Miller
Preceded by Benjamin M. Miller	Governor of Alabama; 1935–1939	Succeeded by Frank M. Dixon
