= William C. Davis (American politician) =

American politician

William Columbus Davis
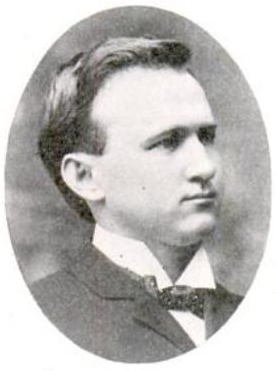

11th Lieutenant Governor of Alabama
- In office January 17, 1927 – January 19, 1931
- Governor: Bibb Graves
- Preceded by: Charles S. McDowell
- Succeeded by: Hugh D. Merrill

Member of the Alabama House of Representatives
- In office 1891

Personal details
- Born: August 5, 1867
- Died: October 4, 1934 (aged 67)
- Party: Democratic

William Columbus Davis (August 5, 1867 – October 4, 1934) was the 11th lieutenant governor of Alabama from 1927 to 1931. A Democrat, Davis served Governor Bibb Graves of the same political party.

A native of Rara Avis, Mississippi, in Itawamba County, Davis moved as a young boy with his parents just across the state line to Marion County, Alabama. He was the son of Samuel McGee Davis, born April 26, 1844 in Gwinnett County, Georgia, died September 27, 1933 in Marion County, Alabama, and Emily Jane Lacy, born September 23, 1844 in Alabama, and died February 4, 1925 in MarIon County, Alabama. Both parents are buried at Providence Cemetery in Itawamba County, located north of Tremont and along the state line with Alabama.

In 1890, Davis relocated to Hamilton, Alabama in 1890 to practice law after years of teaching public school in Mississippi. Two years after moving his law practice to Jasper, Alabama, Davis was elected to the Alabama House of Representatives in 1891. In addition to his time in the House, Davis served as a solicitor of the 14th Judicial Circuit, a chairman of the Congressional Committee, and a member of the Alabama State Committee.

His son, William Columbus Davis, Jr., 1910–2003, was a distinguished Latin Americanist scholar. He established the Latin American Studies Program and taught at The George Washington University for decades. Later he held the Latin America Chair at the National War College for ten years. The younger Davis wrote The Columns of Athens, The Last Conquistadores, and Warnings from the Far South.

Political offices
Preceded by Charles S. McDowell	Lieutenant Governor of Alabama; 1927–1931	Succeeded by Hugh D. Merrill
