= Thomas Kilby =

American politician (1865–1943)

Thomas E. Kilby
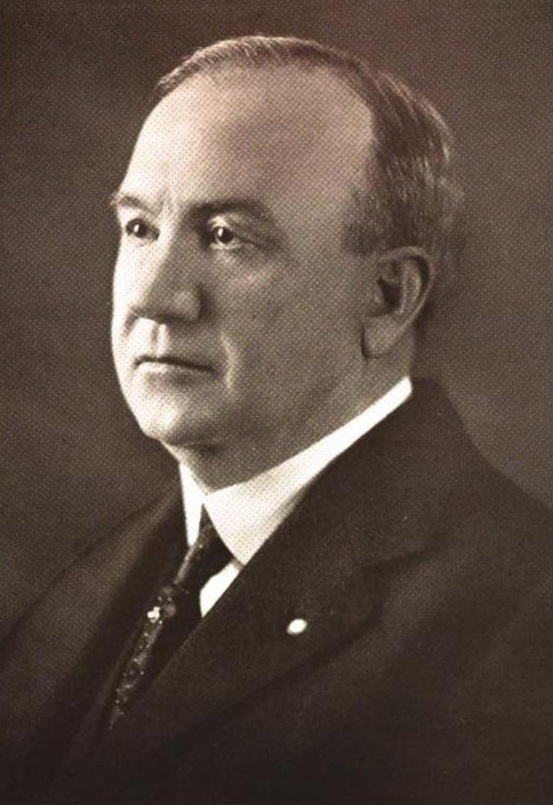
- Kilby in 1922

36th Governor of Alabama
- In office January 20, 1919 – January 15, 1923
- Lieutenant: Nathan L. Miller
- Preceded by: Charles Henderson
- Succeeded by: William W. Brandon

8th Lieutenant Governor of Alabama
- In office January 18, 1915 – January 20, 1919
- Governor: Charles Henderson
- Preceded by: Walter D. Seed Sr.
- Succeeded by: Nathan L. Miller

Member of the Alabama Senate
- In office 1911–1915

Personal details
- Born: Thomas Erby Kilby; July 9, 1865 Lebanon, Tennessee, U.S.
- Died: October 22, 1943 (aged 78) Anniston, Alabama, U.S.
- Resting place: Highland Cemetery, Anniston, Alabama, U.S.
- Party: Democratic
- Spouse: Mary Elizabeth Clark
- Occupation: Manufacturer

Thomas Erby Kilby Sr. (July 9, 1865 – October 22, 1943) was an American politician. He was the eighth lieutenant governor of Alabama and the 36th governor of Alabama.

== Biography ==
Kilby was born in Lebanon, Tennessee, and was educated in public schools. In 1887, he was an agent for the Georgia-Pacific Railroad in Anniston, Alabama. He became a successful businessman in the industrial and banking business.

== Career ==
Kilby was a Democratic politician and served as mayor of Anniston, Alabama from 1905 to 1909. He served as Alabama State Senator from 1911 to 1915.

Kilby served as Lieutenant Governor of Alabama from 1915 to 1919 and as Governor of Alabama from 1919 to 1923. In September 1919, two Black men (Miles Phifer and Robert Crosky) were arrested over allegations they assaulted two white women in separate incidents in Montgomery, Alabama. A mob quickly formed, and a concerned citizen notified Governor Thomas Kilby that there might be a lynching. Kilby ordered the two to be transferred to the relative safety of prison in Wetumpka, Alabama. Nevertheless, they were intercepted and lynched by a White mob on September 29, 1919.

In 1920, Kilby arbitrated the settlement of the lengthy and violent 1920 Alabama coal strike, ruling clearly against the demands of the United Mine Workers of America. The Child Welfare Department was created in 1919 during Kilby's governorship, while new labor laws were introduced.

== Family life ==
Kilby married Mary Elizabeth Clark on June 5, 1894. They had three children.

Kilby House, their home in Anniston, Alabama, was built for Kilby while he was Lieutenant Governor. It is listed on the National Register of Historic Places.

== Death and legacy ==
Kilby died on October 22, 1943, in Anniston, Alabama at 78. He is buried at Highland Cemetery in Anniston.

In 1921, he was depicted on the Alabama Centennial half dollar, making him the first person to appear on a US coin while still alive.

The old Kilby Prison and the current Kilby Correctional Facility are named for Thomas Kilby.

== See also ==
- List of governors of Alabama
- List of lieutenant governors of Alabama

Party political offices
| Preceded by Charles Henderson | Democratic nominee for Governor of Alabama; 1918 | Succeeded by William W. Brandon |
Political offices
| Preceded by Walter D. Seed Sr. | Lieutenant Governor of Alabama; 1915–1919 | Succeeded by Nathan L. Miller |
| Preceded by Charles Henderson | Governor of Alabama; 1919–1923 | Succeeded by William W. Brandon |
