= Charles S. McDowell =

American politician (1871–1943)

Charles Samuel McDowell Jr.

10th Lieutenant Governor of Alabama
- In office January 15, 1923 – January 17, 1927
- Governor: William W. Brandon
- Preceded by: Nathan Lee Miller
- Succeeded by: William C. Davis

Personal details
- Born: October 17, 1871 Eufaula, Alabama, U.S.
- Died: May 22, 1943 (aged 71)
- Party: Democratic

Charles Samuel McDowell Jr. (October 17, 1871 – May 22, 1943) was the tenth lieutenant governor of Alabama from 1923 to 1927, and was the interim Governor of Alabama between July 10 and July 11, 1924, when Governor William W. Brandon was out-of-state for 21 days. The state constitution requires that, if the governor is out of the state for 20 days, that the lieutenant governor acts as governor until he returns.

McDowell was born in Eufaula, Alabama. He graduated from the University of Alabama and opened a law practice in Eufaula in 1897. He served as Mayor of Eufaula from 1908 to 1912, and was President of the Alabama State Bar in 1915–16. He was elected to the Alabama State Senate in 1918.

Political offices
Preceded by Nathan L. Miller	Lieutenant Governor of Alabama; 1923-1927	Succeeded by William C. Davis
