= William W. Brandon =

American politician (1868–1934)

William Woodward Brandon
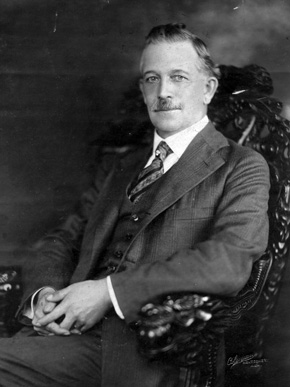
- Official portrait, 1923

37th Governor of Alabama
- In office January 15, 1923 – January 17, 1927
- Lieutenant: Charles S. McDowell
- Preceded by: Thomas Kilby
- Succeeded by: Bibb Graves

Personal details
- Born: June 5, 1868 Talladega, Alabama, US
- Died: December 7, 1934 (aged 66) Tuscaloosa, Alabama, US
- Resting place: Tuscaloosa Memorial Park, Tuscaloosa, Alabama, US
- Party: Democratic
- Spouse: Elizabeth "Lizzie" Andrews Nabors
- Education: University of Alabama
- Occupation: Lawyer

Military service
- Branch/service: United States Army
- Battles/wars: Spanish–American War

William Woodward Brandon (June 5, 1868 – December 7, 1934) was an American Democratic politician who was the 37th governor of Alabama from 1923 to 1927.

== Biography ==
Born June 5, 1868, in Talladega, Alabama, the son of a minister, Rev. Frank T. J. Brandon, and his wife Carrie (Woodward) Brandon, Brandon grew up in Tuscaloosa, Alabama. He attended Cedar Bluff Institute and Tuscaloosa High School and studied law at the University of Alabama from 1891 to 1892. While still a law student, the colorful Brandon was elected City Clerk of Tuscaloosa. He set up a law practice in Tuscaloosa in 1892 and was appointed a justice of the peace the same year. Brandon was a Methodist. He believed that the United States should maintain a "warm and close relationship" with the United Kingdom. He was known as one of the most "eloquent and brilliant campaign speakers in" Alabama. In 1892 he published a military journal titled The Citizen Soldier in Tuscaloosa.

As a member of the Warrior National Guard from 1886, Brandon eventually led the unit as a major of the U.S. Army in the Spanish–American War. Appointed Adjutant General of the Alabama National Guard in 1899 by Governor William J. Samford, he was later reappointed by Governor William D. Jelks.

Brandon was a member of the Alabama House of Representatives from 1896 to 1901. In 1906 he was elected State Auditor of Alabama. From 1911 until 1923, he was a probate judge in Tuscaloosa County.

Judge Brandon was a candidate for governor twice, losing in 1918 to Thomas E. Kilby but defeating Bibb Graves (who later succeeded him) in 1922 with a platform calling for an economy in government and no new taxes. As governor, he kept his campaign promise to levy no new taxes but was instrumental in rescinding the tax exemption of the Alabama Power Company. On leaving office, he left the state treasury with a surplus.

Brandon was a much less activist governor than the energetic Kilby (he did little for education). Still, he continued Kilby's ambitious road construction and improvement program of Mobile's dock facilities, funding the latter with a $10 million bond issue. He also strengthened child labor laws and created the Alabama Forestry Commission. Brandon left the state for 21 days in 1924; under the 1901 state constitution, the lieutenant governor becomes acting governor if a governor is out of the state for more than 20 days. Thus, Charles McDowell became Governor of Alabama on July 10 and 11, 1924.

Known as "Plain Bill," Brandon led the Alabama delegation to the 1924 Democratic National Convention, the first such convention to be broadcast via radio. The convention was marked by a deadlock between the supporters of the Irish Catholic New York Governor Al Smith and former Secretary of the Treasury William Gibbs McAdoo (the son-in-law of former President Woodrow Wilson) whose candidacy was backed by the anti-Catholic Ku Klux Klan. Neither candidate was able to get the required two-thirds of the delegates as critical delegations, including Alabama's, clung to their "favorite son" candidates. In Alabama's case, the favorite son was Senator Oscar Underwood.

The Convention became the longest continually running convention in history, as 103 ballots were taken before a compromise candidate, John W. Davis, was nominated. As the first state alphabetically, Alabama led every ballot, and Brandon, reporting the state's unanimous vote tally ballot after ballot, became the symbol of the convention's deadlock. For a time, his booming southern drawl heard on the radio, repeatedly declaring, "Alabama casts twenty-four votes for Oscar W. Underwood," became one of the most recognizable voices in the country.

After leaving the governorship in 1927, Brandon was appointed to his former office of Probate Judge of Tuscaloosa County by his onetime political opponent Governor Graves. Brandon married Elizabeth Andrews Nabors, a widow with two daughters, on June 27, 1900. He died in Tuscaloosa aged 66 on December 7, 1934, and is interred at Tuscaloosa Memorial Park.

Party political offices
Preceded by Thomas Kilby	Democratic nominee for Governor of Alabama; 1922	Succeeded by Bibb Graves
Political offices
Preceded by Thomas Kilby	Governor of Alabama; 1923–1927	Succeeded by Bibb Graves
