= 1926 in the United States =

- Decades: 1900s; 1910s; 1920s; 1930s; 1940s
- See also: History of the United States (1918–1945); Timeline of United States history (1900–1929); List of years in the United States

Events from the year 1926 in the United States.

== Incumbents ==
=== Federal government ===
- President: Calvin Coolidge (R-Massachusetts)
- Vice President: Charles G. Dawes (R-Illinois)
- Chief Justice: William Howard Taft (Ohio)
- Speaker of the House of Representatives: Nicholas Longworth (R-Ohio)
- Senate Majority Leader: Charles Curtis (R-Kansas)
- Congress: 69th

==== State governments ====
Governors and lieutenant governors

=== Governors ===
- Governor of Alabama: William W. Brandon (Democratic)
- Governor of Arizona: George W. P. Hunt (Democratic)
- Governor of Arkansas: Tom Jefferson Terral (Democratic)
- Governor of California: Friend Richardson (Republican)
- Governor of Colorado: Clarence Morley (Republican)
- Governor of Connecticut: John H. Trumbull (Republican)
- Governor of Delaware: Robert P. Robinson (Republican)
- Governor of Florida: John W. Martin (Democratic)
- Governor of Georgia: Clifford Walker (Democratic)
- Governor of Idaho: Charles C. Moore (Republican)
- Governor of Illinois: Len Small (Republican)
- Governor of Indiana: Edward L. Jackson (Republican)
- Governor of Iowa: John Hammill (Republican)
- Governor of Kansas: Ben S. Paulen (Republican)
- Governor of Kentucky: William J. Fields (Democratic)
- Governor of Louisiana: Henry L. Fuqua (Democratic) (until October 11), Oramel H. Simpson (Democratic) (starting October 11)
- Governor of Maine: Owen Brewster (Republican)
- Governor of Maryland: Albert C. Ritchie (Democratic)
- Governor of Massachusetts: Alvan T. Fuller (Republican)
- Governor of Michigan: Alex Groesbeck (Republican)
- Governor of Minnesota: Theodore Christianson (Republican)
- Governor of Mississippi: Henry L. Whitfield (Democratic)
- Governor of Missouri: Samuel Aaron Baker (Republican)
- Governor of Montana: John E. Erickson (Democratic)
- Governor of Nebraska: Adam McMullen (Republican)
- Governor of Nevada: James G. Scrugham (Democratic)
- Governor of New Hampshire: John Gilbert Winant (Republican)
- Governor of New Jersey: George Sebastian Silzer (Democratic) (until January 19), A. Harry Moore (Democratic) (starting January 19)
- Governor of New Mexico: Arthur T. Hannett (Democratic)
- Governor of New York: Al Smith (Democratic)
- Governor of North Carolina: Angus Wilton McLean (Democratic)
- Governor of North Dakota: Arthur G. Sorlie (Republican)
- Governor of Ohio: A. Victor Donahey (Democratic)
- Governor of Oklahoma: Martin E. Trapp (Democratic)
- Governor of Oregon: Walter M. Pierce (Democratic)
- Governor of Pennsylvania: Gifford Pinchot (Republican)
- Governor of Rhode Island: Aram J. Pothier (Republican)
- Governor of South Carolina: Thomas Gordon McLeod (Democratic)
- Governor of South Dakota: Carl Gunderson (Republican)
- Governor of Tennessee: Austin Peay (Democratic)
- Governor of Texas: Miriam A. Ferguson (Democratic)
- Governor of Utah: George Dern (Democratic)
- Governor of Vermont: Franklin S. Billings (Republican)
- Governor of Virginia: Elbert Lee Trinkle (Democratic) (until February 1), Harry F. Byrd (Democratic) (starting February 1)
- Governor of Washington: Roland H. Hartley (Republican)
- Governor of West Virginia: Howard M. Gore (Republican)
- Governor of Wisconsin: John J. Blaine (Republican)
- Governor of Wyoming: Nellie Tayloe Ross (Democratic)

=== Lieutenant governors ===
- Lieutenant Governor of Alabama: Charles S. McDowell (Democratic)
- Lieutenant Governor of California: Clement Calhoun Young (Republican)
- Lieutenant Governor of Colorado: Sterling Byrd Lacy (Democratic)
- Lieutenant Governor of Connecticut: J. Edwin Brainard (Republican)
- Lieutenant Governor of Delaware: James H. Anderson (Republican)
- Lieutenant Governor of Idaho: H. C. Baldridge (Republican)
- Lieutenant Governor of Illinois: Fred E. Sterling (Republican)
- Lieutenant Governor of Indiana: F. Harold Van Orman (Republican)
- Lieutenant Governor of Iowa: Clem F. Kimball (Republican)
- Lieutenant Governor of Kansas: De Lanson Alson Newton Chase (Republican)
- Lieutenant Governor of Kentucky: Henry Denhardt (political party unknown)
- Lieutenant Governor of Louisiana: Oramel H. Simpson (Democratic) (until month and day unknown), Philip H. Gilbert (Democratic) (starting month and day unknown)
- Lieutenant Governor of Massachusetts: Frank G. Allen (Republican)
- Lieutenant Governor of Michigan: George W. Welsh (Republican)
- Lieutenant Governor of Minnesota: William I. Nolan (Republican)
- Lieutenant Governor of Mississippi: Dennis Murphree (Democratic)
- Lieutenant Governor of Missouri: Philip Allen Bennett (Republican)
- Lieutenant Governor of Montana: W. S. McCormack (Republican)
- Lieutenant Governor of Nebraska: George A. Williams (Republican)
- Lieutenant Governor of Nevada: Maurice J. Sullivan (Democratic)
- Lieutenant Governor of New Mexico: Edward G. Sargent (Republican)
- Lieutenant Governor of New York: Seymour Lowman (Republican) (until end of December 31)
- Lieutenant Governor of North Carolina: Jacob E. Long (Democratic)
- Lieutenant Governor of North Dakota: Walter Maddock (Republican)
- Lieutenant Governor of Ohio: Charles H. Lewis (Republican)
- Lieutenant Governor of Oklahoma: vacant
- Lieutenant Governor of Pennsylvania: David J. Davis (Republican)
- Lieutenant Governor of Rhode Island: Nathaniel W. Smith (Republican)
- Lieutenant Governor of South Carolina: E. B. Jackson (Democratic)
- Lieutenant Governor of South Dakota: Alva Clark Forney (Republican)
- Lieutenant Governor of Tennessee: Lucius D. Hill (Democratic)
- Lieutenant Governor of Texas: Barry Miller (Democratic)
- Lieutenant Governor of Vermont: Walter K. Farnsworth (Republican)
- Lieutenant Governor of Virginia: Junius Edgar West (Democratic)
- Lieutenant Governor of Washington: W. Lon Johnson (Republican)
- Lieutenant Governor of Wisconsin: Henry A. Huber (Republican)

== Events ==
=== January–March ===
- February 1 – Land on Broadway and Wall Street in New York City is sold at a record $7 per sq inch.
- March 16 – Robert Goddard launches the first liquid-fuel rocket, at Auburn, Massachusetts.

=== April–June ===
- April 12 – By a vote of 45–41, the United States Senate unseats Iowa Senator Smith W. Brookhart and seats Daniel F. Steck, after Brookhart has served for over one year.
- April 30 – African-American pilot Bessie Coleman is killed after falling 2,000 feet (610 m) from an airplane.
- May 10 – Planes piloted by Major Harold Geiger and Horace Meek Hickam, students at the Air Corps Tactical School, collide in mid-air over Langley Field, Virginia. Hickam parachutes to safety.
- May 18 – Evangelist Aimee Semple McPherson disappears while visiting a beach at Venice, California; on June 23 she is found stumbling in the desert of Agua Prieta, Mexico just south of Douglas, Arizona, claiming she has been kidnapped, drugged, tortured and held for ransom, but has escaped.
- May 20 – The United States Congress passes the Air Commerce Act, licensing pilots and planes.
- June 19 – DeFord Bailey is the first African-American to perform on Nashville's Grand Ole Opry.
- June 23 – The College Board administers the first SAT, a major standardized test for university and college admission in the U.S.

=== July–September ===
- July 1 – Benjamin Franklin Bridge opens.
- July 4 – The United States sesquicentennial is celebrated.
- July 12 – A lightning strike destroys an ammunition depot in Dover, New Jersey.
- July 26 – The National Bar Association incorporates in the United States.
- August 6 – In New York City, the Warner Brothers' Vitaphone system premieres with the movie Don Juan starring John Barrymore.
- August 18 – A weather map is televised for the first time, sent from NAA Arlington to the Weather Bureau Office in Washington, D.C.
- September 11 – Aloha Tower is officially dedicated at Honolulu Harbor in the Territory of Hawai'i.
- September 16 – Philip Dunning and George Abbott's play Broadway premieres in New York City.
- September 18 – Great Miami Hurricane: A strong hurricane devastates Miami, Florida, leaving over 100 dead and causing several hundred million dollars in damage (equal to nearly $100 billion today).
- September 20 – Twelve cars full of gangsters open fire at the Hawthorne Inn, Al Capone's Chicago headquarters. Only one of Capone's men is wounded.
- September 25 – The Detroit Cougars, a professional ice hockey club (National Hockey League) and predecessor of the Detroit Red Wings, is founded.

=== October–December ===
- October 10 – The St. Louis Cardinals defeat the New York Yankees, 4 games to 3, to win their first World Series Title. This World Series ended when Babe Ruth attempted to steal second base and is the only World Series to end this way.
- October 14 – Poland presents President Calvin Coolidge with a 111 volume gift called a "Polish Declaration of Admiration and Friendship for the United States of America" comprising some 15,000 bound sheets with the signatures of an estimated 5,500,000 Polish citizens on the occasion of America's 150th anniversary of independence.
- November 2 – Bibb Graves is elected the 38th governor of Alabama defeating J. A. Bingham.
- November 10 – In San Francisco, California, a necrophiliac serial killer named Earle Nelson (dubbed "Gorilla Man") kills and then rapes his 9th victim, a boardinghouse landlady named Mrs. William Edmonds.
- November 11 – The plan for a United States Numbered Highway System is approved by the American Association of State Highway Officials, so establishing U.S. Route 66.
- November 15 – The NBC radio network opens with 24 stations (formed by Westinghouse, General Electric and RCA).
- November 27 – In Williamsburg, Virginia, the restoration of Colonial Williamsburg begins.
- December 23 – Conservative Nicaraguan President Adolfo Díaz requests U.S. military assistance in the Nicaraguan civil war (1926–27). U.S. Marines immediately set up neutral zones in Puerto Cabezas and at the mouth of the Rio Grande to protect American and foreign lives and property.

=== Undated ===
- Microbiologist Selman Waksman publishes Enzymes.
- The Pike School in Andover, Massachusetts, is founded.
- Lundy's Restaurant is founded at Sheepshead Bay, Brooklyn.

=== Ongoing ===
- Lochner era (c. 1897–c. 1937)
- U.S. occupation of Haiti (1915–1934)
- Prohibition (1920–1933)
- Roaring Twenties (1920–1929)

== Births ==
=== January ===
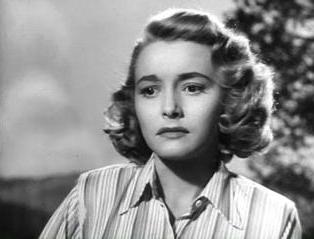
Patricia Neal

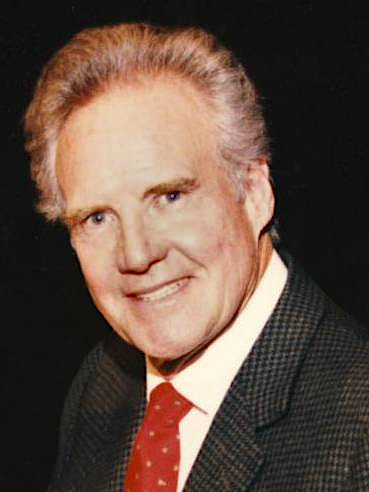
Steve Reeves

- January 2
  - Harold Bradley, American country music session guitarist (d. 2019)
  - Howard Caine, American actor (d. 1993)
- January 5
  - Hosea Williams, civil rights leader, activist, minister, businessman, philanthropist, scientist, and politician (d. 2000)
  - W. D. Snodgrass, poet (d. 2009)
- January 6
  - Ralph Branca, baseball player (d. 2016)
  - Pat Flaherty, race car driver (d. 2002)
- January 8
  - Chester Feldman, television game show producer (d. 1997)
  - Evelyn Lear, soprano (d. 2012)
  - Soupy Sales, comedian (d. 2009)
- January 11 – Grant Tinker, television executive (d. 2016)
- January 12 – Ray Price, American country music singer and songwriter (d. 2013)
- January 14 – Tom Tryon, American actor, novelist (d. 1991)
- January 17 – Newton N. Minow, attorney (d. 2023)
- January 20
  - Patricia Neal, actress (d. 2010)
  - David Tudor, American pianist, composer (d. 1996)
- January 21
  - Saul Mandel, illustrator, artist, animator and graphic designer (d. 2011)
  - Steve Reeves, American actor (d. 2000)
- January 24 – Ruth Asawa, sculptor (d. 2013)
- January 29 – Bob Falkenburg, tennis player and entrepreneur (d. 2022)
- January 31 – Chuck Willis, singer and songwriter (d. 1958) (some sources give his year of birth as 1928)

=== February ===
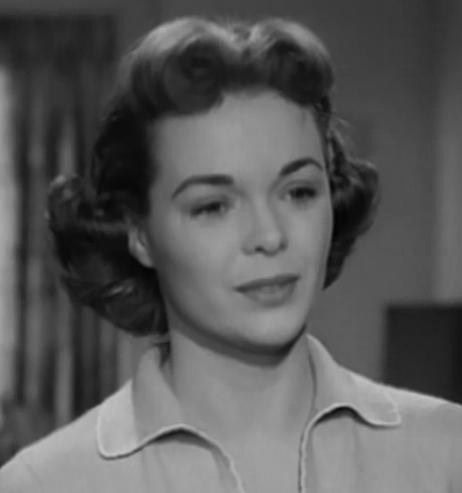
Nancy Gates

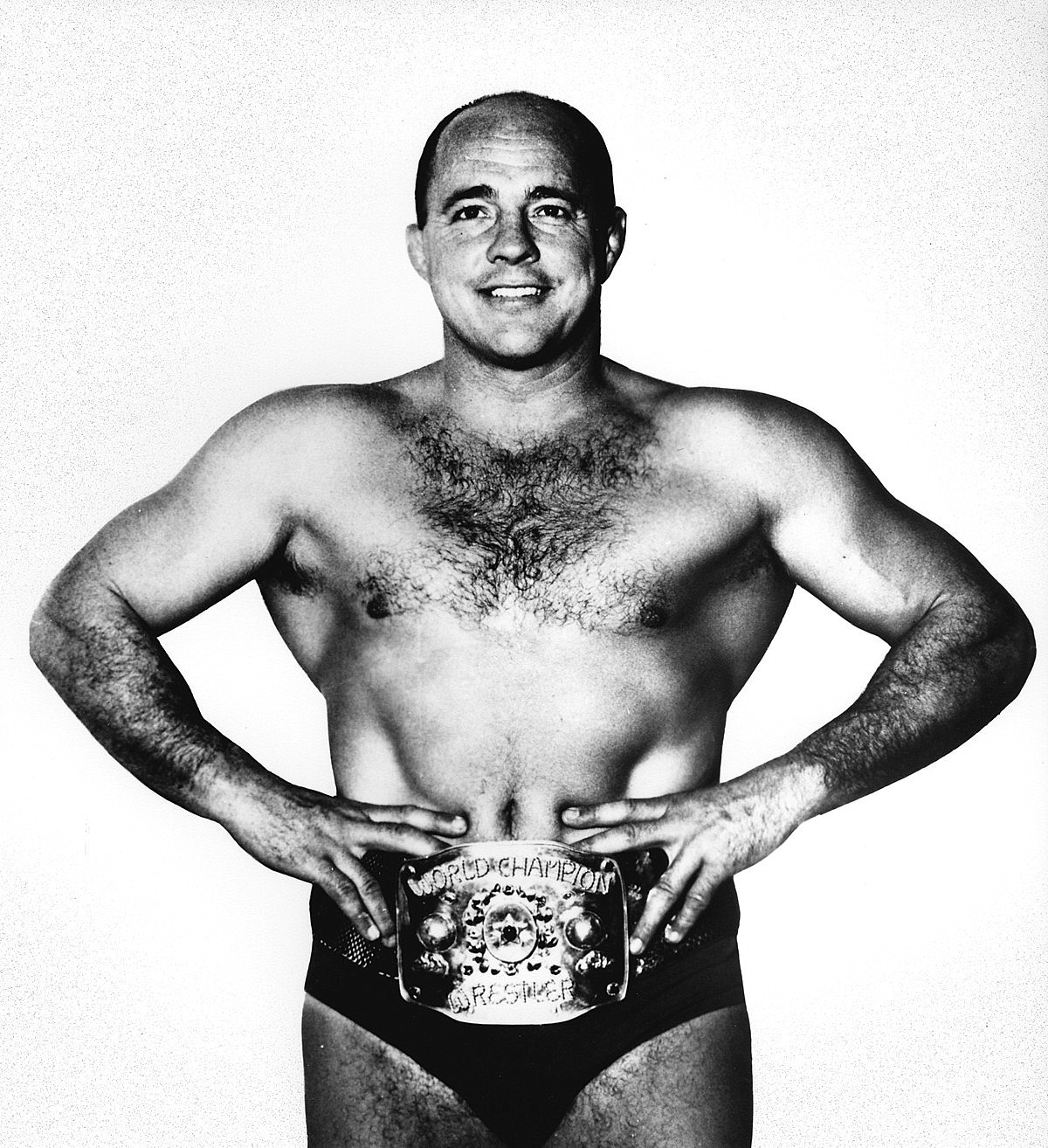
Verne Gagne

- February 1 – Nancy Gates, American actress (d. 2019)
- February 3
  - Richard Yates, American novelist (d. 1992)
  - Glen Tetley, American dancer and choreographer (d. 2007)
- February 7 – Bill Hoest, cartoonist (d. 1988)
- February 8 – Neal Cassady, American writer (d. 1968)
- February 10 – Mimi Sheraton, food critic (d. 2023)
- February 12
  - Charles Van Doren, American professor, subject of film Quiz Show (d. 2019)
  - Joe Garagiola, baseball player (d. 2016)
- February 13 – Bill Mercer, sportscaster (d. 2025)
- February 14
  - Al Brodax, film, television producer (d. 2016)
  - Moneta Sleet Jr., press photographer (d. 1996)
- February 17
  - Peter T. Flawn, geologist and educator (d. 2017)
  - Lee Hoiby, composer (d. 2011)
- February 18
  - A. R. Ammons, poet and academic (d. 2001)
  - Wallace Berman, painter and illustrator (d. 1976)
  - Len Ford, American football player (d. 1972)
- February 20
  - Whitney Blake, American actress (d. 2002)
  - Richard Matheson, American author (d. 2013)
  - Bob Richards, American track and field athlete (d. 2023)
- February 22 – Nelson Bunker Hunt, businessman (d. 2014)
- February 23
  - Lawrence Holofcener, sculptor, poet, lyricist, playwright, novelist, actor and director (d. 2017)
  - Claire Shulman, American politician (d. 2020)
- February 26
  - Verne Gagne, American professional wrestler (d. 2015)
  - Henry Molaison, American memory disorder patient (d. 2008)
  - Doris Belack, American actress (d. 2011)

=== March ===
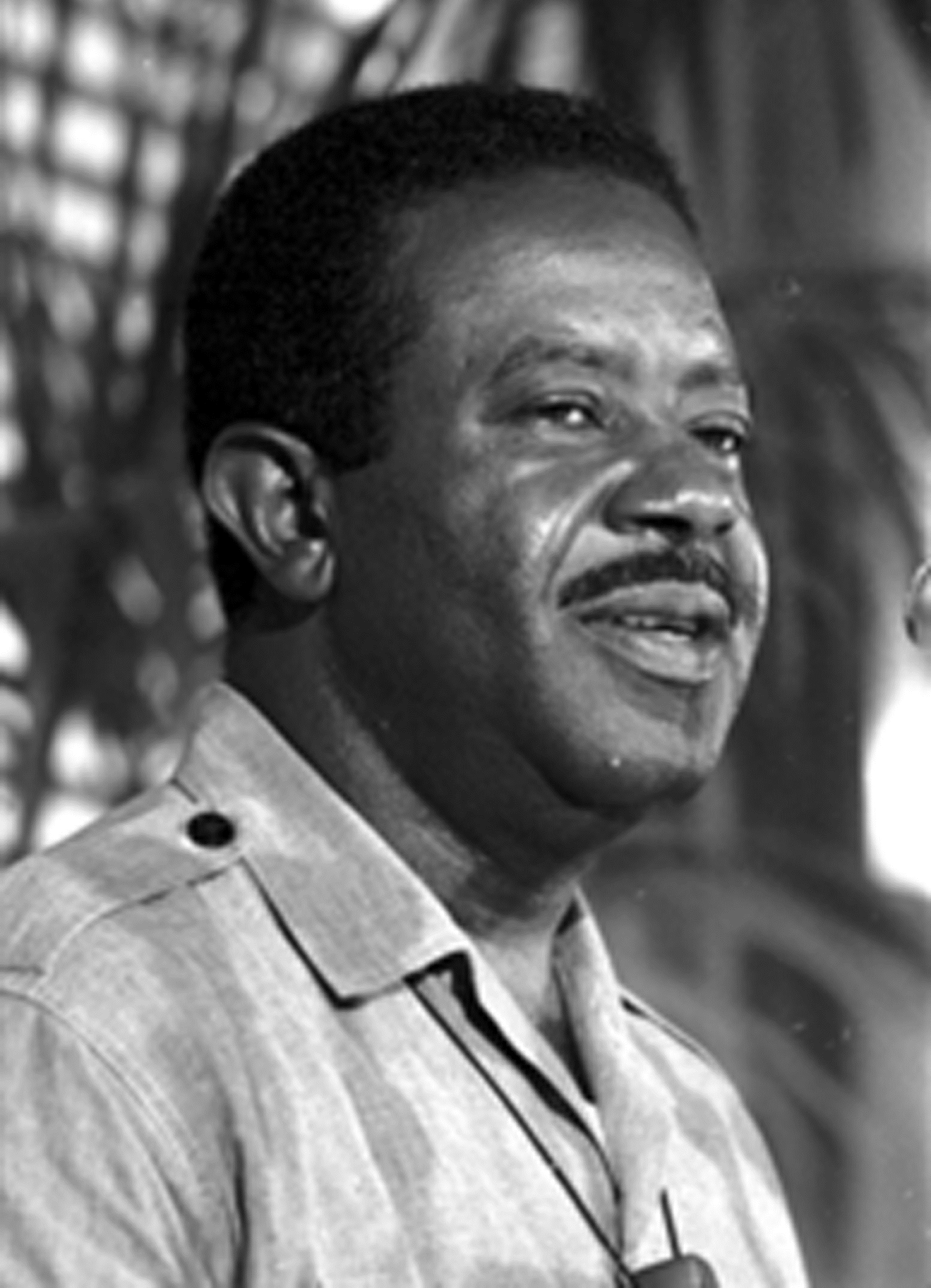
Ralph Abernathy

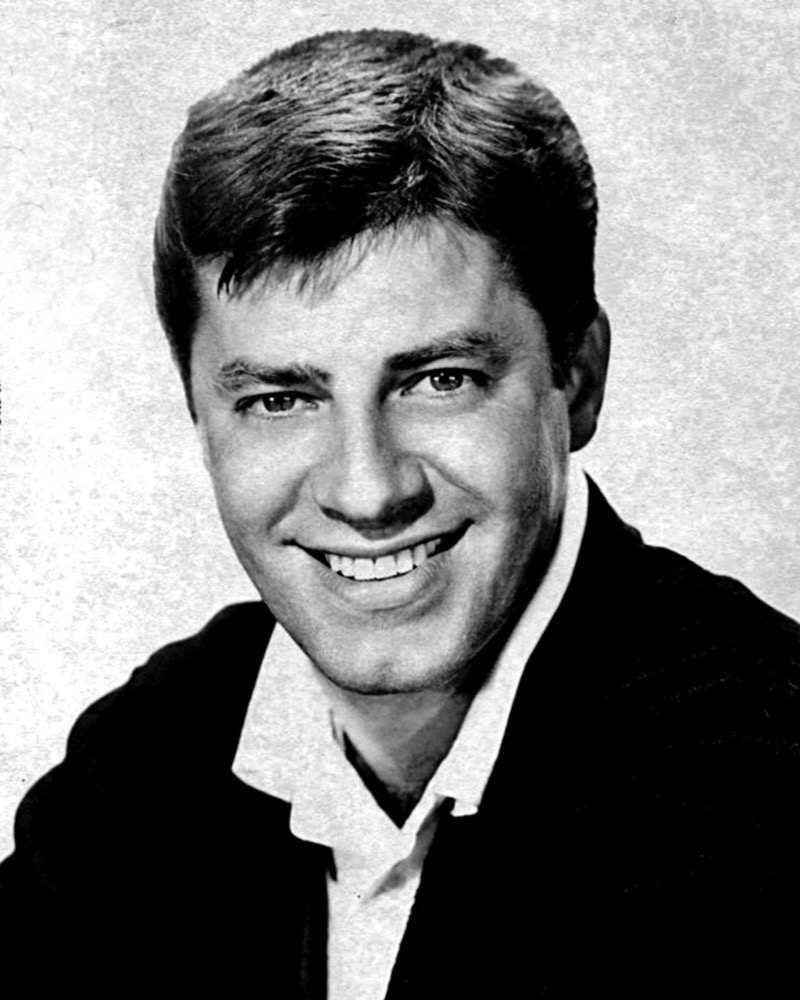
Jerry Lewis

- March 1 – Pete Rozelle, National Football League commissioner (d. 1996)
- March 2 – Murray Rothbard, economist (d. 1995)
- March 3
  - Craig Dixon, athlete (d. 2021)
  - James Merrill, poet (d. 1995)
- March 4
  - DeVan Dallas, politician (d. 2016)
  - Richard DeVos, billionaire, co-founder of Amway (d. 2018)
  - Fran Warren, popular singer (d. 2013)
- March 5 – Joan Shawlee, actress (d. 1987)
- March 6 – Alan Greenspan, economist (d. 2026)
- March 8 – Dick Teed, Major League baseball player (d. 2014)
- March 9 – Joe Franklin, radio, television personality (d. 2015)
- March 11
  - Ralph Abernathy, African-American civil rights leader (d. 1990)
  - Thomas Starzl, American physician (d. 2017)
- March 12 – George Ariyoshi, American politician, lawyer (d. 2026)
- March 15
  - Ben Johnston, composer (d. 2019)
  - Norm Van Brocklin, American football player (d. 1983)
- March 16
  - Charles Goodell, politician (d. 1987)
  - Jerry Lewis, comedian, humanitarian and philanthropist (d. 2017)
  - Geraldine Weiss, trader (d. 2022)
- March 17 – Jaynne Bittner, baseball player (d. 2017)
- March 18 – Peter Graves, American actor (d. 2010)
- March 20 – Marge Calhoun, surfer (d. 2017)
- March 25 – Gene Shalit, film and book critic and television personality (d. 2026)
- March 27 – Harry Connick Sr., attorney (d. 2024)
- March 30 – Peter Marshall, entertainer (d. 2024)

=== April ===
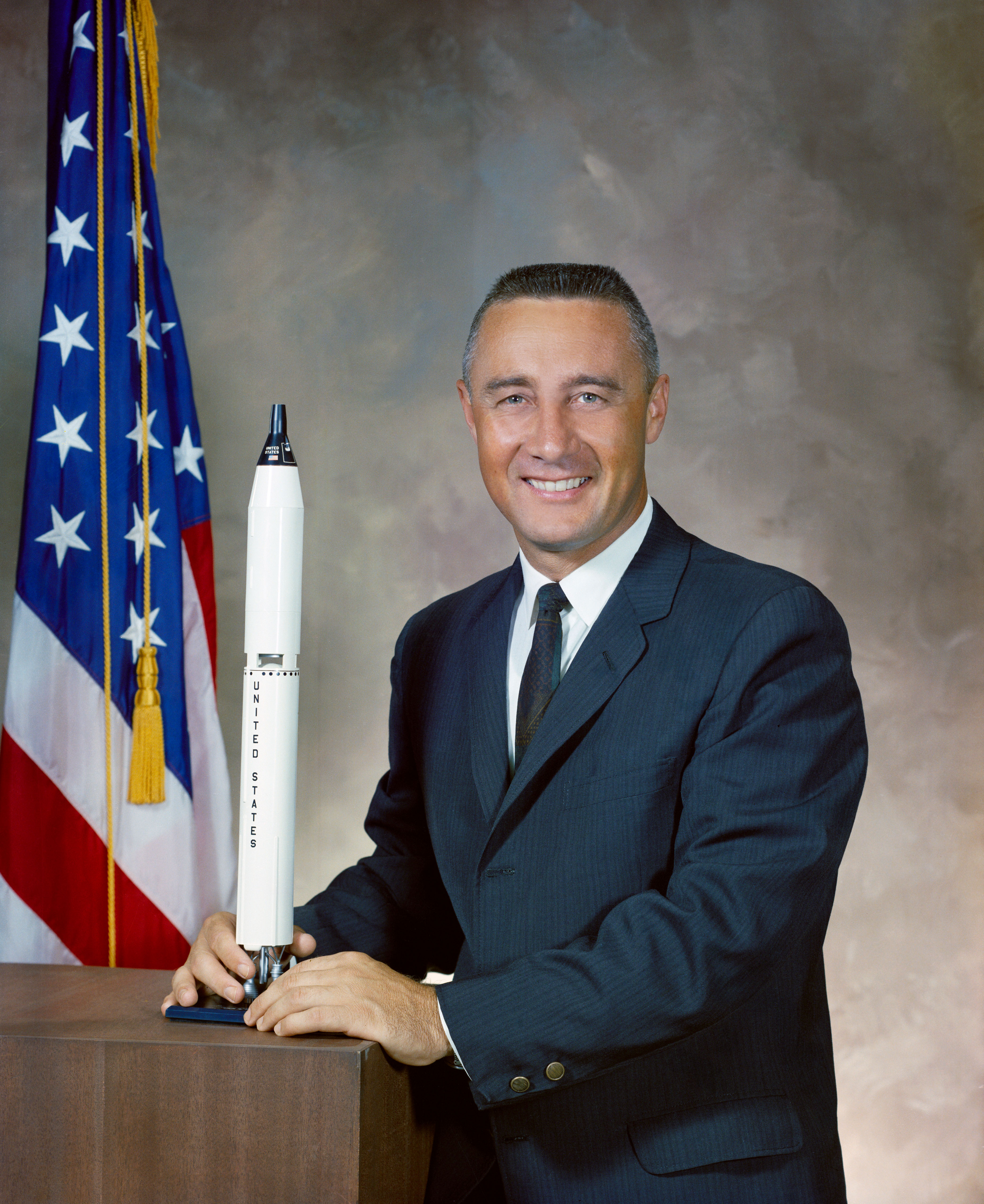
Gus Grissom

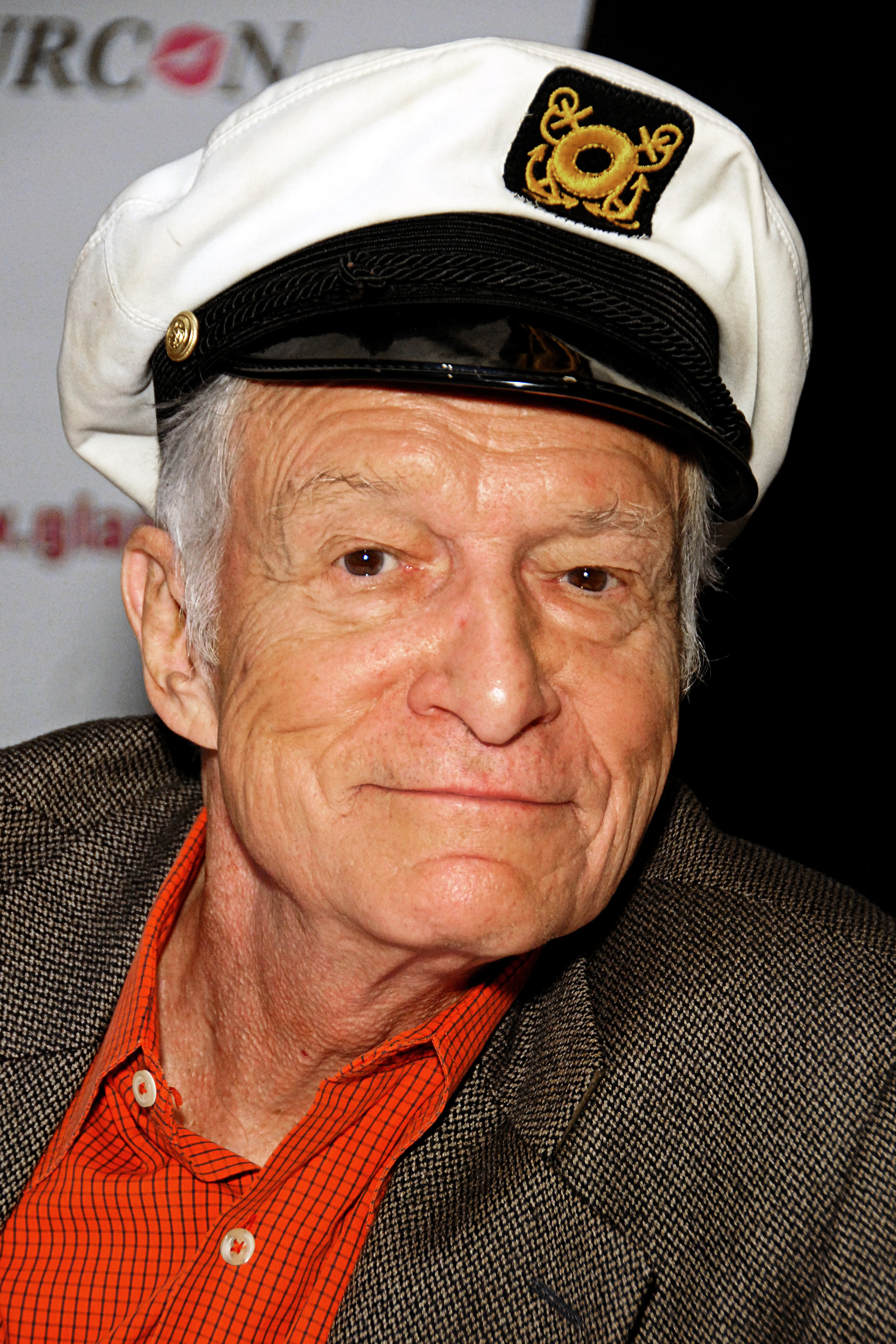
Hugh Hefner

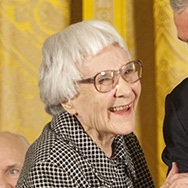
Harper Lee

- April 1
  - Charles Bressler, American operatic tenor and educator (d. 1996)
  - Anne McCaffrey, American-born Irish author (d. 2011)
- April 3
  - Gus Grissom, American astronaut (d. 1967)
  - R. W. Schambach, American televangelist, speaker and author (d. 2012)
- April 4
  - Addo Bonetti, politician and soldier (d. 2021)
  - Bill Ryan, American journalist (d. 1997)
- April 5 – Roger Corman, American filmmaker, producer, actor and businessman (d. 2024)
- April 6
  - Alexander Butterfield, American public official, Watergate whistleblower (d. 2026)
  - Randy Weston, American jazz pianist and composer (d. 2018)
- April 8
  - Sue Casey, American actress (d. 2019)
  - Shecky Greene, American actor and comedian (d. 2023)
- April 9
  - Hugh Hefner, American magazine editor, founder of Playboy (d. 2017)
  - Harris Wofford, American politician, U.S. Senator from 1991 to 1995 (d. 2019)
- April 11 – David Manker Abshire, United States Army officer (d. 2014)
- April 12 – Jane Withers, American actress (d. 2021)
- April 15 – Walter Dee Huddleston, U.S. Senator from Kentucky from 1973 to 1985 (d. 2018)
- April 21 – Wayne E. Meyer, American rear-admiral (d. 2009)
- April 22 – Charlotte Rae, American actress, singer (d. 2018)
- April 23 – J. P. Donleavy, American novelist (d. 2017 in Ireland)
- April 24 – Marilyn Erskine, actress
- April 27
  - Alvin Baldus, American Democratic politician (d. 2017)
  - Tim LaHaye, evangelist, speaker and author (d. 2016)
- April 28
  - James Bama, American artist, illustrator (d. 2022)
  - Greg Gates, American Olympic rower (d. 2020)
  - Harper Lee, American novelist (d. 2016)
- April 29
  - Paul Baran, American internet pioneer (d. 2011)
  - Carrie Meek, American politician and educator (d. 2021)
- April 30 – Cloris Leachman, American actress (d. 2021)

=== May ===
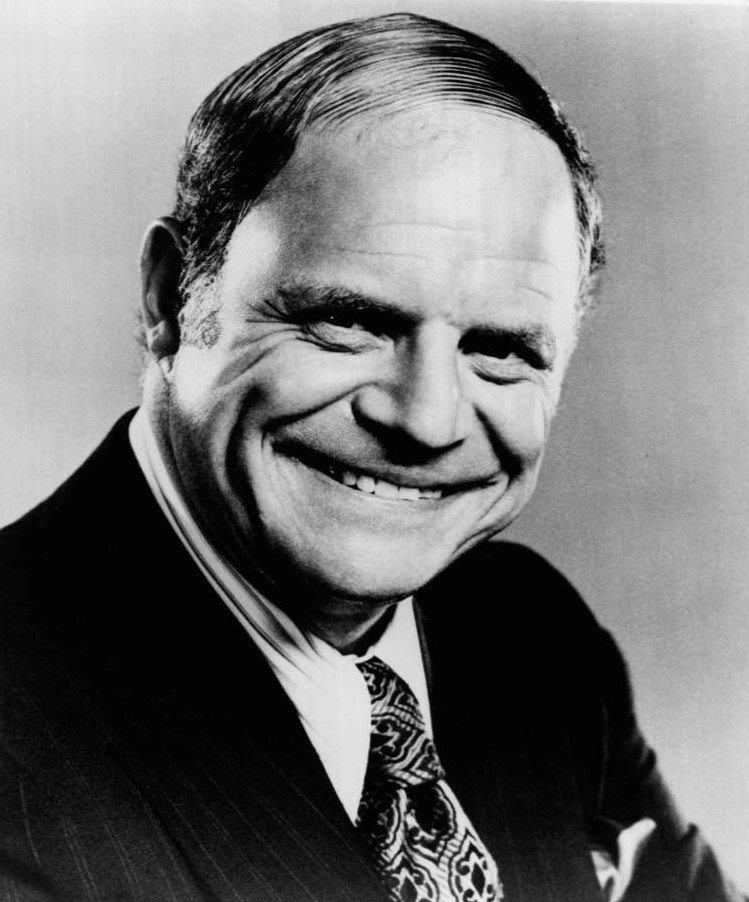
Don Rickles

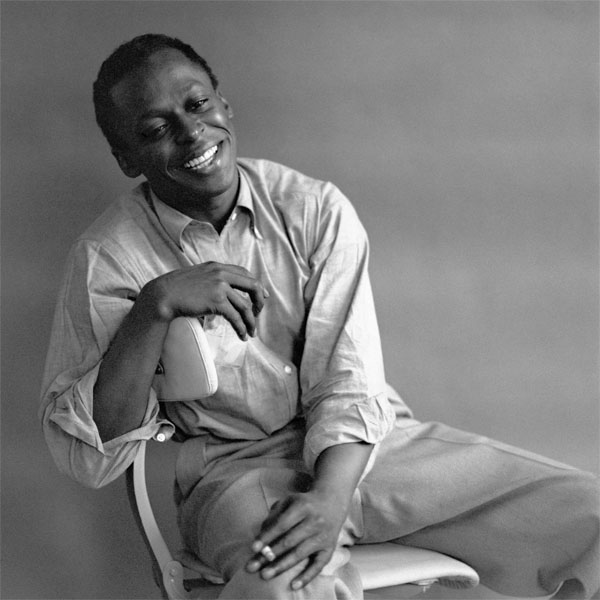
Miles Davis

- May 5
  - Ann B. Davis, American actress (d. 2014)
  - Bing Russell, American actor (d. 2003)
- May 8 – Don Rickles, American stand-up comedian, actor (d. 2017)
- May 10 – Tichi Wilkerson Kassel, American film personality, publisher of The Hollywood Reporter (d. 2004)
- May 11 – Caesar Trunzo, American soldier and politician (d. 2013)
- May 12
  - Earl Hutto, American politician (d. 2020)
  - Marilyn Knowlden, American child actress (d. 2025)
- May 18 – Douglas Henry, American politician (d. 2017)
- May 19 – Mark Andrews, U.S. Senator from North Dakota from 1981 to 1987 (d. 2020)
- May 21 – Robert Creeley, American poet (d. 2005)
- May 23 – Aileen Hernandez, African American civil rights activist (d. 2017)
- May 25
  - Claude Akins, American actor (d. 1994)
  - Bill Sharman, American basketball player, coach (d. 2013)
- May 26 – Miles Davis, African-American jazz musician (d. 1991)
- May 30
  - Johnny Gimble, country musician, fiddler (d. 2015)
  - Marilyn Hagerty, newspaper columnist (d. 2025)
  - Tony Terran, trumpet player, session musician (d. 2017)

=== June ===
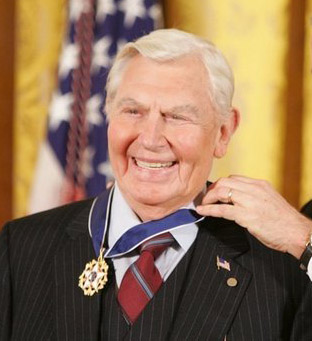
Andy Griffith

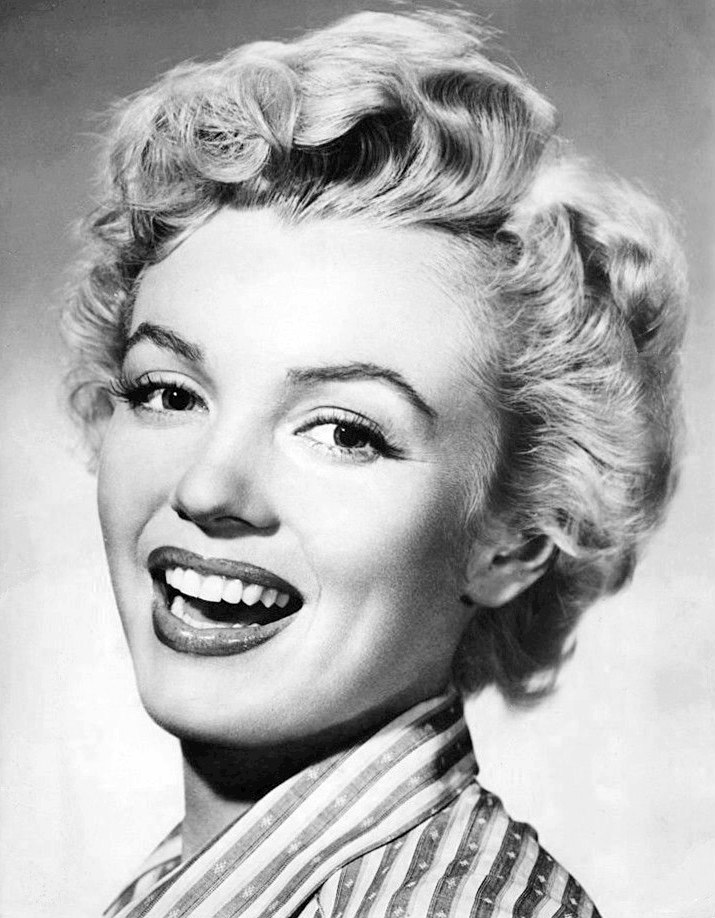
Marilyn Monroe

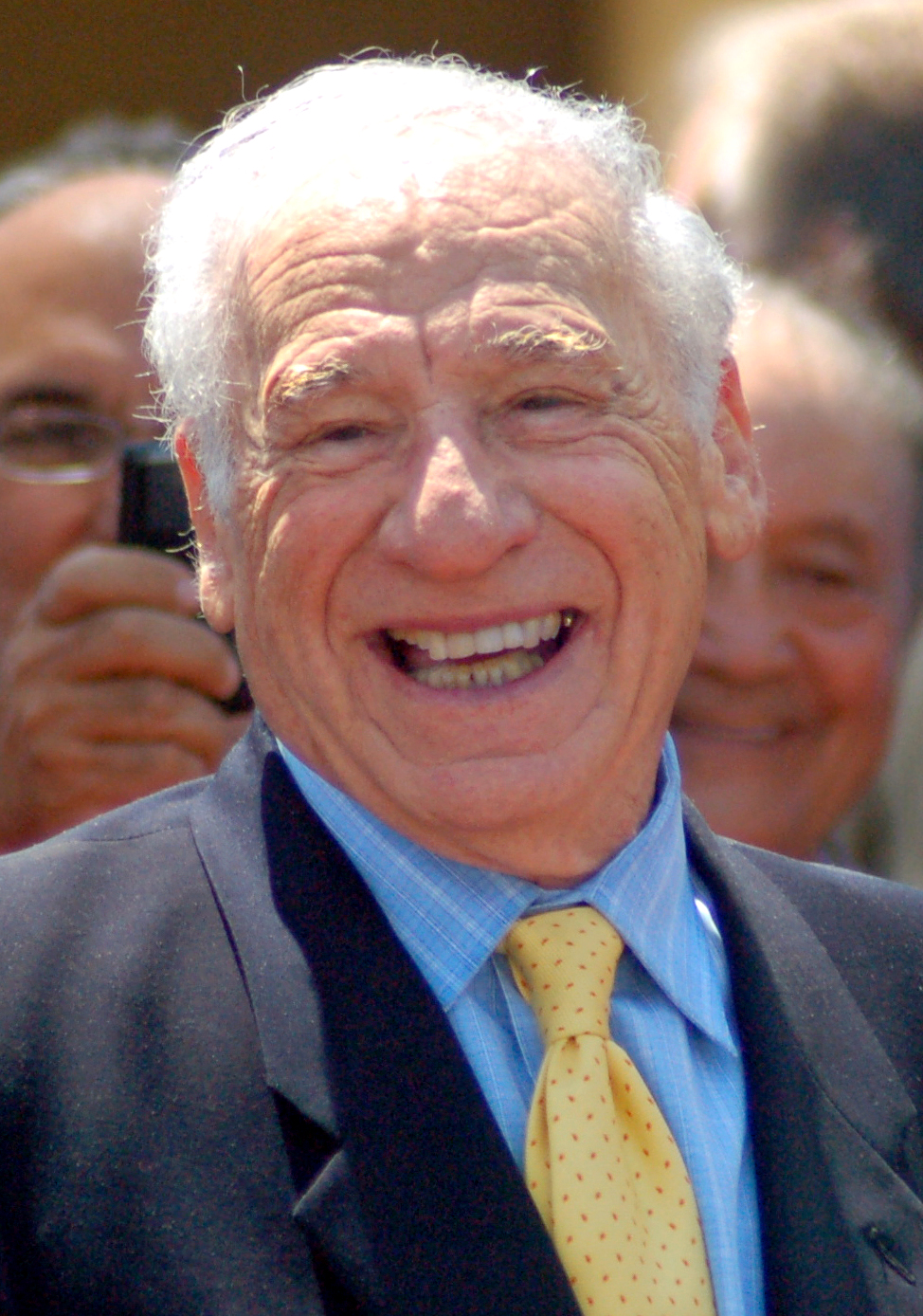
Mel Brooks

- June 1
  - Andy Griffith, American actor (d. 2012)
  - Marilyn Monroe, American actress and icon (d. 1962)
  - Richard Schweiker, U.S. Senator from Pennsylvania from 1969 to 1981 (d. 2015)
- June 3
  - Roscoe Bartlett, Republican member of the United States House of Representatives
  - Roxcy Bolton, American feminist and civil and women's rights activist (d. 2017)
  - Allen Ginsberg, American poet (d. 1997)
- June 5 – Peter G. Peterson, American banker and businessman, American Secretary of Commerce (d. 2018)
- June 6 – Sholom Rivkin, American rabbi (d. 2011)
- June 9
  - Georgia Holt, singer and actress (d. 2022)
  - Happy Rockefeller, Second Lady of the United States as wife of Nelson A. Rockefeller (d. 2015)
- June 10 – June Haver, American actress and singer (d. 2005)
- June 11 – Carlisle Floyd, American composer (d. 2021)
- June 13
  - Satoru Abe, American sculptor and painter (d. 2025)
  - Paul Lynde, American actor and comedian (d. 1982)
  - June Krauser, American swimmer (d. 2014)
- June 14
  - Gene Derricotte, American football player (d. 2023)
  - Don Newcombe, American baseball player (d. 2019)
- June 16 – William F. Roemer, Jr., United States FBI agent (d. 1996)
- June 18 – Murray A. Straus, American sociologist and professor (University of New Hampshire), creator of the Conflict tactics scale (d. 2016)
- June 19
  - Erna Schneider Hoover, mathematician and inventor
  - Arno Mayer, historian and writer (d. 2023)
- June 21
  - Fred Cone, professional American football fullback (d. 2021)
  - Noel Parmentel, American writer and political journalist (d. 2024)
- June 22
  - George Englund, film editor, director, producer and actor (d. 2017)
  - Ray Szmanda, radio and television announcer (d. 2018)
- June 24
  - Blackie Gejeian, race car driver, race car builder, and hot rod enthusiast (d. 2016)
  - Barbara Scofield, tennis player (d. 2023)
- June 27
  - Len Ceglarski, hockey player (d. 2017)
  - Don Raleigh, ice hockey player (d. 2012)
- June 28
  - George Booth, American cartoonist (d. 2022)
  - Mel Brooks, American actor, comedian, and screenwriter
- June 29
  - Roger Stuart Bacon, American politician (d. 2021)
  - Bobby Morgan, baseball player (d. 2023)

=== July ===
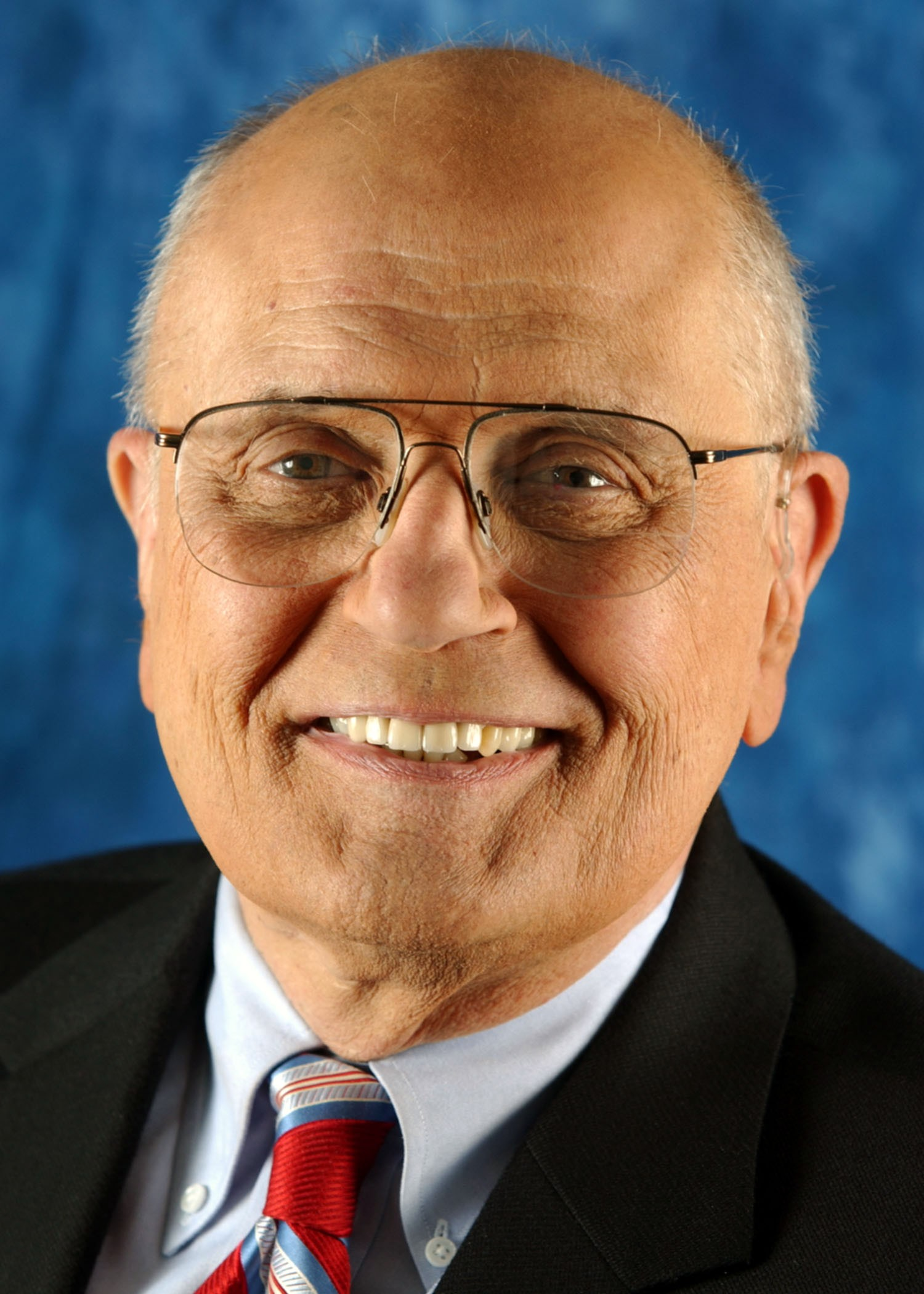
John Dingell

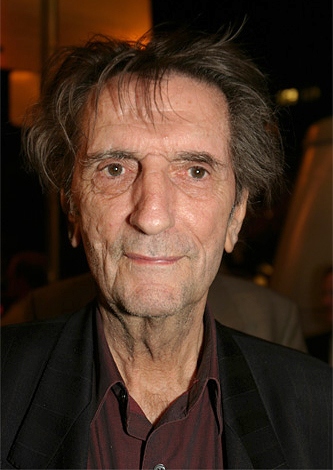
Harry Dean Stanton

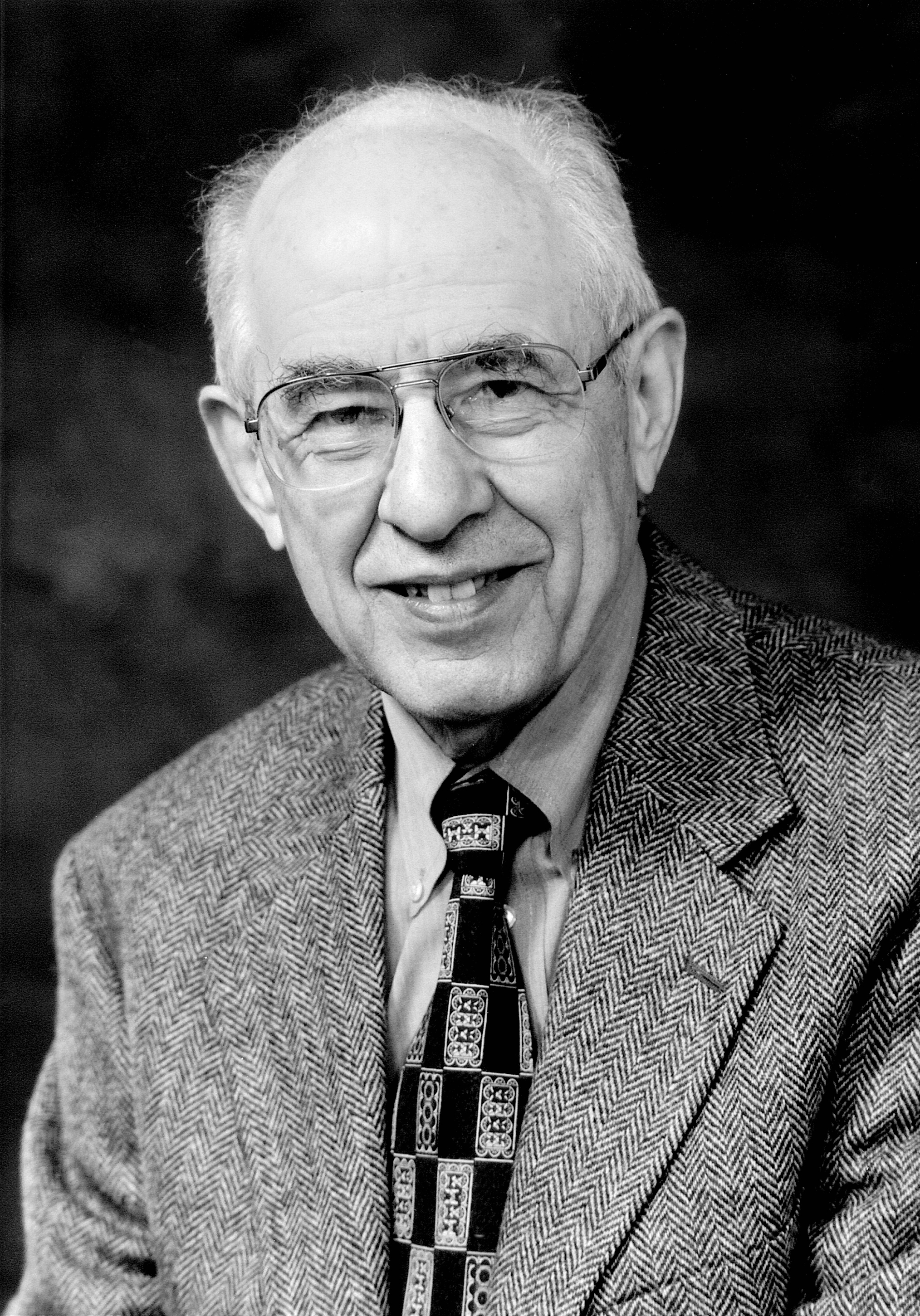
Hilary Putnam

- July 1
  - Fernando J. Corbató, American computer scientist (d. 2019)
  - Robert Fogel, American economist, Nobel Prize laureate (d. 2013)
- July 3 – Rae Allen, American actress, director, and singer (d. 2022)
- July 4
  - Mary Stuart, soap actress and musician (d. 2002)
  - Lake Underwood, race car driver and businessman (d. 2008)
- July 5
  - Roy Hawes, American first baseman in Major League Baseball (d. 2017)
  - Mario Picone. American pitcher (d. 2013)
- July 8 – John Dingell, American politician (d. 2019)
- July 10
  - Carleton Carpenter, American actor and dancer (d. 2022)
  - Donald Geary, American ice hockey player (d. 2015)
  - Fred Gwynne, American actor and author (d. 1993)
  - Harry MacPherson, American pitcher (d. 2017)
  - Tony Settember, American racing driver (d. 2014)
- July 11
  - Frederick Buechner, American author and theologian (d. 2022)
  - Joe Houston, American saxophonist (d. 2015)
- July 12 – Abe Addams, American soccer player (d. 2017)
- July 13
  - T. Loren Christianson, American politician (d. 2019)
  - Thomas Clark, American politician (d. 2020)
- July 14
  - Wallace Jones, basketball player (d. 2014)
  - Harry Dean Stanton, actor (d. 2017)
- July 16
  - Paul M. Ellwood Jr., physician (d. 2022)
  - Irwin Rose, biologist, recipient of the Nobel Prize in Chemistry (d. 2015)
- July 17
  - William Pierson, American television, motion picture and stage actor (d. 2004)
  - Charles Zwick, American civil servant (d. 2018)
- July 18 – Nita Bieber, American actress (d. 2019)
- July 19
  - Helen Gallagher, American actress, dancer, and singer (d. 2024)
  - Robert E. Lavender, American Justice (d. 2020)
- July 23 – Johnny Groth, American baseball player and scout (d. 2021)
- July 27
  - Marlow Cook, U.S. Senator from Kentucky from 1968 to 1974 (d. 2016)
  - Simpson Kalisher, American photographer (d. 2023)
- July 31
  - Bernard Nathanson, American medical doctor and activist (d. 2011)
  - Hilary Putnam, American philosopher, mathematician and computer scientist (d. 2016)

=== August ===
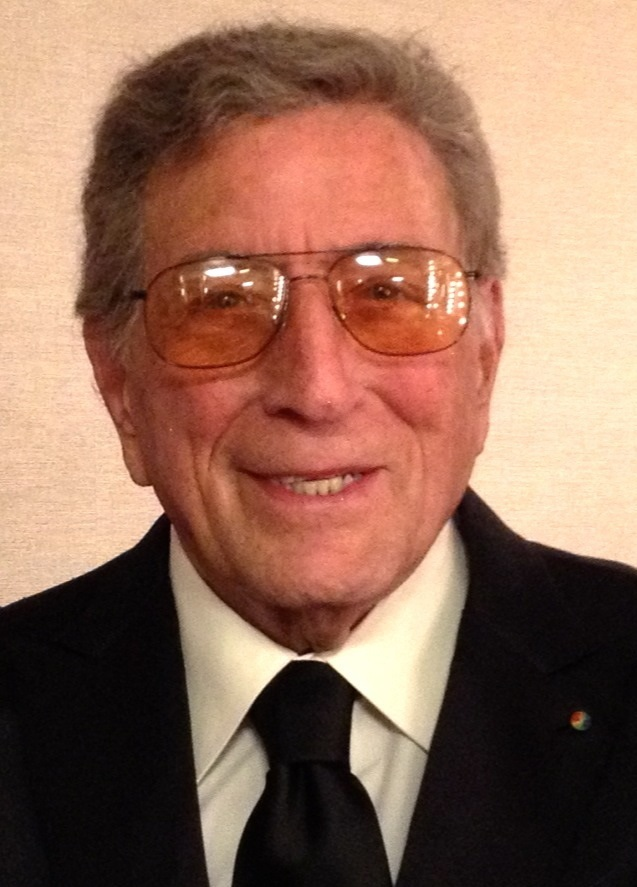
Tony Bennett

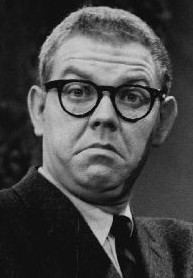
Stan Freberg

- August 1 – Meg Randall, actress (d. 2018)
- August 2 – W. Carter Merbreier, television host (Captain Noah) (d. 2016)
- August 3
  - Tony Bennett, singer (d. 2023)
  - David Johnson, photographer (d. 2024)
- August 6 – Janet Asimov, American writer and psychiatrist (d. 2019)
- August 7
  - John Otho Marsh Jr., American politician, 14th United States Secretary of the Army (d. 2019)
  - Stan Freberg, American author, recording artist and comedian (d. 2015)
  - Bowen Stassforth, American swimmer (d. 2019)
- August 9 – Frank M. Robinson, American science fiction and techno-thriller writer (d. 2014)
- August 11 – Ron Bontemps, American basketball player (d. 2017)
- August 12
  - Douglas Croft, actor (d. 1963)
  - John Derek, American actor and film director (d. 1998)
  - Wallace Markfield, American writer (d. 2002)
- August 14 – Buddy Greco, American jazz and pop singer and pianist (d. 2017)
- August 16 – Norman Wexler, American screenwriter (d. 1999)
- August 21 – Carolyn Leigh, lyricist (d. 1983)
- August 22 – Lois Hall, American actress (d. 2006)
- August 26 – Robert Vickrey, American artist and author (d. 2011)
- August 27 – Albert H. Owens Jr., American oncologist (d. 2017)
- August 29
  - Don Doll, American football player and coach (d. 2010)
  - Betty Lynn, American actress (d. 2021)

=== September ===
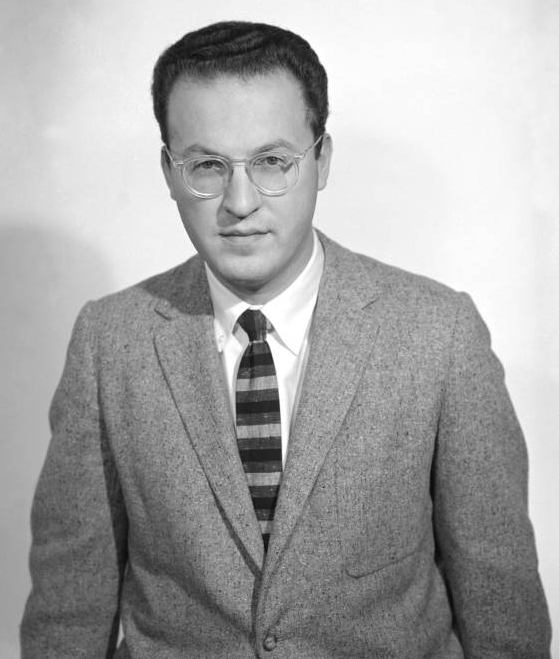
Donald A. Glaser

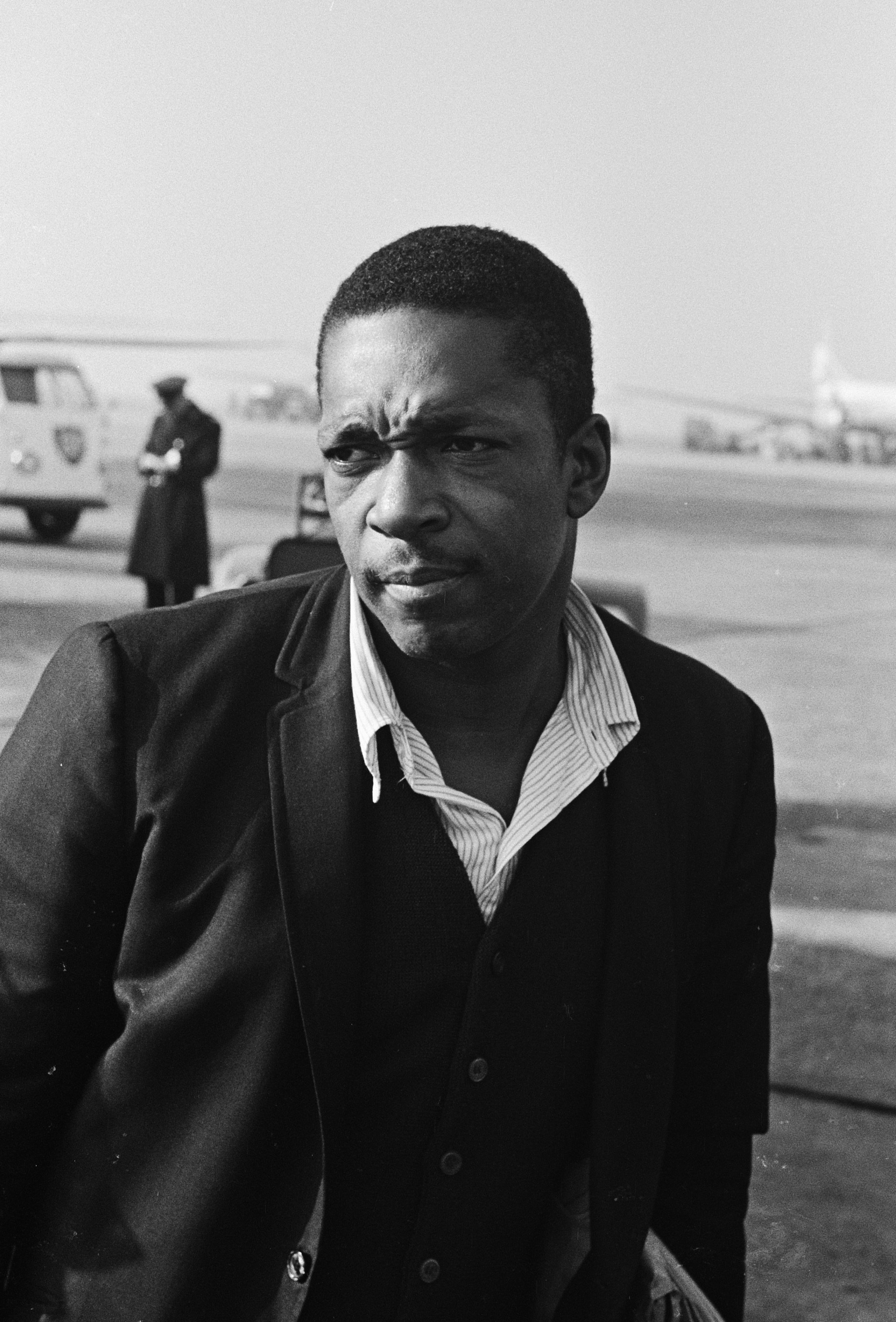
John Coltrane

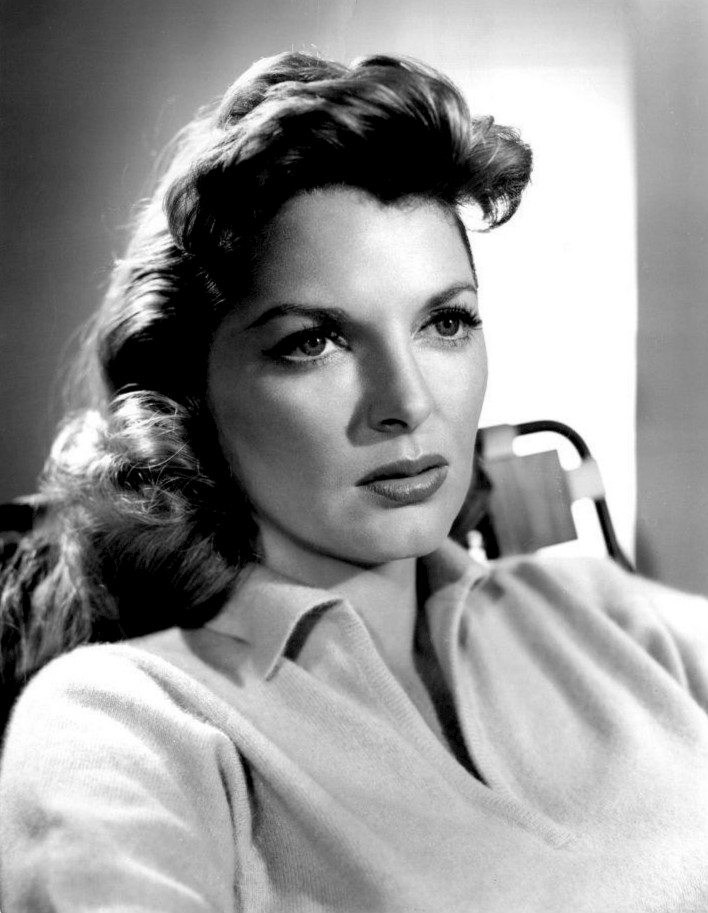
Julie London

- September 1 – Stanley Cavell, American philosopher (d. 2018)
- September 3
  - Joseph P. Kolter, American politician (d. 2019)
  - Alison Lurie, American author and academic (d. 2020)
- September 4 – Robert J. Lagomarsino, American politician (d. 2021)
- September 6
  - Maurice Prather, American photographer (d. 2001)
  - Clancy Sigal, American writer (d. 2017)
- September 7
  - Ronnie Gilbert, American folk singer and songwriter (d. 2015)
  - Don Messick, American voice actor (d. 1997)
  - Donald Pinkel, American physician (d. 2022)
- September 9 – Charles Duncan Jr., American businessman and politician (d. 2022)
- September 14
  - Dick Dale, American singer and musician (d. 2014)
  - John F. Kurtzke, American neurologist (d. 2015)
- September 15 – William J. Bauer, American judge (d. 2025)
- September 16
  - Tommy Bond, American actor (d. 2005)
  - John Knowles, American author (d. 2001)
  - Robert Schuller, American televangelist, motivational speaker and author (d. 2015)
- September 17 – Bill Black, American bass player and bandleader, a pioneer of rock and roll music (d. 1965)
- September 18
  - Joe Kubert, American author and illustrator, founded The Kubert School (d. 2012)
  - Bob Toski, American golfer
- September 19
  - James Lipton, American television personality and writer (d. 2020)
  - Duke Snider, American baseball player (d. 2011)
- September 21 – Donald A. Glaser, American physicist, Nobel Prize laureate (d. 2013)
- September 22 – Bill Smith, American clarinet player and composer (d. 2020)
- September 23
  - John Coltrane, African-American jazz saxophonist (d. 1967)
  - Henry Silva, American actor (d. 2022)
- September 25 – Charles J. Colgan, American politician and businessman (d. 2017)
- September 26 – Julie London, American jazz and pop singer, screen actress and model (d. 2000)
- September 28
  - Ralph Ahn, American actor (d. 2022)
  - Jerry Clower, American country comedian (d. 1998)
  - Oliver W. Dillard, United States Army major general (d. 2015)
- September 29
  - Chuck Cooper, American basketball player (d. 1984)
  - Philip Ruppe, American politician (d. 2026)
- September 30 – Dave Hunt, American apologist, speaker, radio commentator and author (d. 2013)

=== October ===
Jean Peters

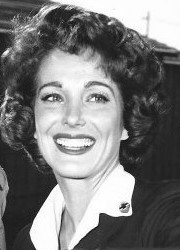
Julie Adams

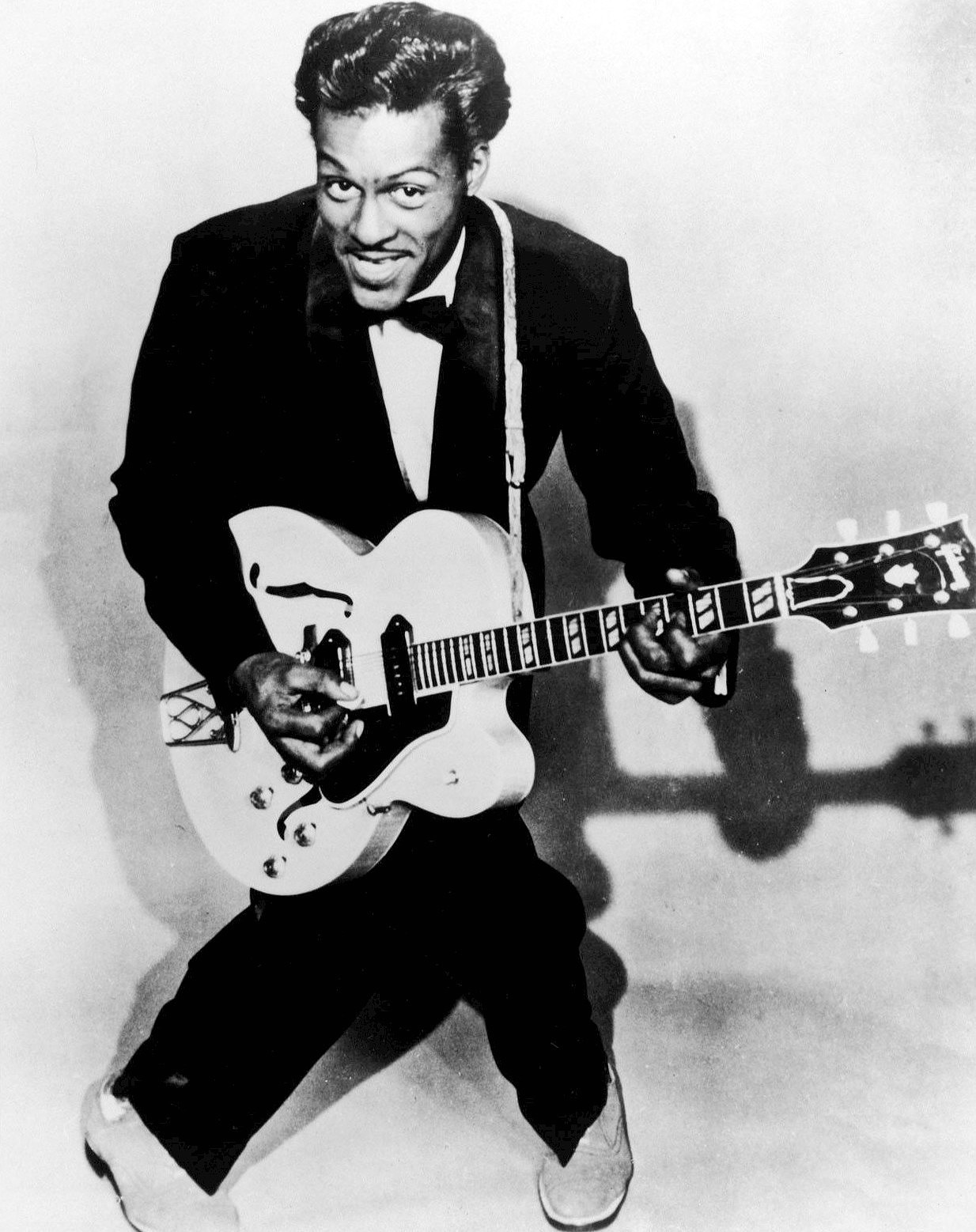
Chuck Berry

- October 1 – Max Morath, American musician (d. 2023)
- October 4 – Senaida Wirth, American female professional baseball player (d. 1967)
- October 10 – Richard Jaeckel, American actor (d. 1997)
- October 11 – Earle Hyman, American actor (d. 2017)
- October 13 – Jesse L. Brown, first African-American aviator in the United States Navy (d. 1950)
- October 15
  - Jeffrey Hayden, American television director and producer (d. 2016)
  - Evan Hunter, American fiction writer (d. 2005)
  - Jean Peters, American actress (d. 2000)
- October 16 – Charles Dolan, American billionaire businessman (d. 2024)
- October 17
  - Julie Adams, American actress (d. 2019)
  - Beverly Garland, American actress and businesswoman (d. 2008)
- October 18
  - Chuck Berry, African-American guitarist, singer and songwriter, a pioneer of rock and roll music (d. 2017)
  - Pauline Pirok, American female professional baseball player (d. 2020)
- October 19 – Marjorie Tallchief, American ballerina (d. 2021)
- October 21 – Bob Rosburg, American golfer (d. 2009)
- October 25
  - Jimmy Heath, American saxophonist and composer (d. 2020)
  - Biff McGuire, American actor (d. 2021)
  - Eddie Sheldrake. American restaurateur and basketball player (d. 2025)
- October 27 – H. R. Haldeman, 4th White House Chief of Staff (d. 1993)
- October 28 – Bowie Kuhn, American Commissioner of Baseball (d. 2007)

=== November ===
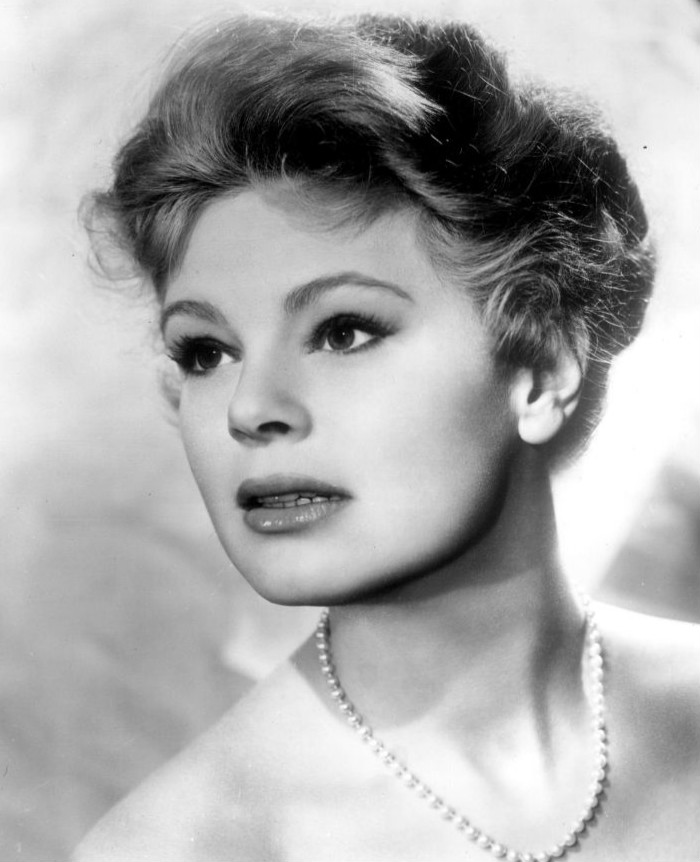
Betsy Palmer

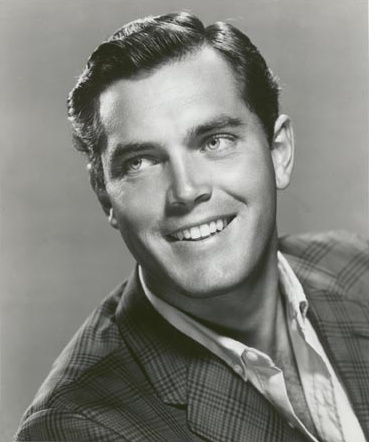
Jeffrey Hunter

- November 1 – Betsy Palmer, American actress (d. 2015)
- November 2
  - Whitey Skoog, American basketball player (d. 2019)
  - Charlie Walker, American country music singer-songwriter (d. 2008)
- November 4
  - Carmen A. Orechio, American politician (d. 2018)
  - Laurence Rosenthal, composer
- November 8
  - Darleane C. Hoffman, American nuclear chemist (d. 2025)
  - Jack Mendelsohn, American writer-artist (d. 2017)
  - Ira Millstein, American lawyer (d. 2024)
- November 9 – Stu Griffing, American Olympic rower (d. 2021)
- November 13 – Harry Hughes, American politician (d. 2019)
- November 14 – Tom Hatten, American radio and television personality (d. 2019)
- November 16 – Amy Applegren, American professional baseball player (d. 2011)
- November 19 – Jeane Kirkpatrick, American ambassador (d. 2006)
- November 20 – Ann Turner Cook, American educator and writer (d. 2022)
- November 22 – Bobbie Wygant, American broadcaster (d. 2024)
- November 23 – R. L. Burnside, American musician (d. 2005)
- November 25
  - Poul Anderson, science fiction author (d. 2001)
  - Claire Fagin, American nurse and academic (d. 2024)
  - Jeffrey Hunter, American actor (d. 1969)
  - Terry Kilburn, American actor
- November 30 – Richard Crenna, American actor (d. 2003)

=== December ===
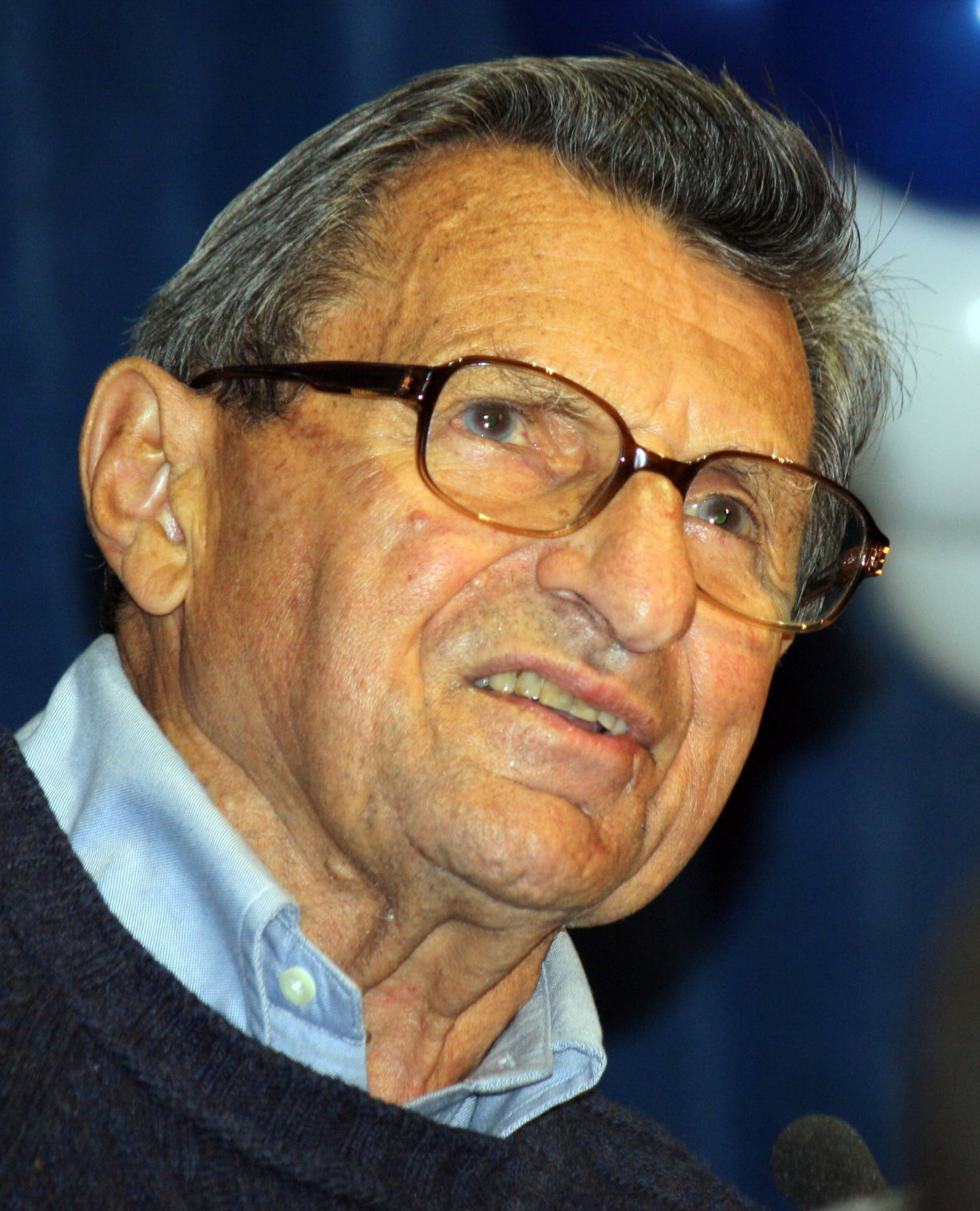
Joe Paterno

- December 7 – William John McNaughton, American bishop (d. 2020)
- December 8 – Ralph Puckett, U.S. Army Medal of Honor recipient (d. 2024)
- December 9
  - Henry Way Kendall, American physicist, Nobel Prize laureate (d. 1999)
  - Lorenzo Wright, American track and field athlete (d. 1972)
- December 10 – Guitar Slim, American New Orleans blues guitarist (d. 1959)
- December 12 – Dorli Rainey, American political activist (d. 2022)
- December 13 – Carl Erskine, American baseball player (d. 2024)
- December 16 – James McCracken, American tenor (d. 1988)
- December 17 – Patrice Wymore, American actress (d. 2014)
- December 19 – Herb Stempel, American game show contestant (d. 2020)
- December 20 – David Levine, American artist and illustrator (d. 2009)
- December 21
  - Elisabeth Elliot, Christian author and speaker (d. 2015)
  - Joe Paterno, American football player and coach (d. 2012)
- December 23 – Robert Bly, poet (d. 2021)
- December 26 – Champ Butler, singer (d. 1992)

== Deaths ==
- January 26 – John Flannagan, Roman Catholic priest (born 1860)
- January 30 – Barbara La Marr, silent film actress (born 1896)
- February 9 – Edith Julia Griswold, patent attorney (born 1863)
- February 21 – Charles Ellis Johnson, photographer (born 1857)
- March 2 – Victory Bateman, stage and silent screen actress (born 1865)
- March 11 – Maibelle Heikes Justice, novelist and screenwriter (born 1871)
- March 12 – E. W. Scripps, newspaper publisher (born 1854)
- March 16 – Sergeant Stubby, World War I hero war dog (born 1916)
- April 11 – Luther Burbank, botanist (born 1849)
- May 10 – Alton B. Parker, judge and political candidate (born 1852)
- May 26 – Frank Nelson Cole, mathematician (born 1861)
- July 10 – Sarah P. Monks, naturalist and educator (born 1841)
- July 26 – Robert Todd Lincoln, statesman and businessman, son of Abraham Lincoln (born 1843)
- July 30 –
  - Albert B. Cummins, U.S. Senator from Iowa from 1908 to 1926 (born 1850)
  - Max Levy, American inventor and scientist (born 1857)
- October 20 – Eugene V. Debs, labor leader (born 1855)
- October 22 – John G. Shedd, businessman (born 1850)
- October 23 – Olympia Brown, suffragette (born 1835)
- October 24 – Charles Marion Russell, "cowboy artist" (born 1864)
- October 31 – Harry Houdini, illusionist and stunt performer, known for escape acts (born 1874)
- November 3 – Annie Oakley, performance artist (born 1860)
- November 12 – Joseph Gurney Cannon, Speaker of the U.S. House of Representatives from 1903 to 1911 (born 1836)
- November 15 – Lafayette Young, U.S. Senator from Iowa from 1910 to 1911 (born 1848)
- December 10 – Peter Remondino, Italian-born physician, author, first president of the San Diego Board of Health, co-founder of San Diego's first private hospital (born 1846)
- December 31 – Henry A. du Pont, U.S. Senator from Delaware from 1906 to 1917 (born 1838)

== See also ==
- 1926 in American television
- List of American films of 1926
- Timeline of United States history (1900–1929)
