= July 13 =

July 13 this year in various calendars
- Monday, 13 July 2026
Akan	Kurudwo
Armenian	28 Hrotich 1475
Aztec	Quecholli 4, 3 Malīnalli
Babylonian	27 Simanu, 2337 SE
Balinese pawukon	Luang, Pepet, Pasah, Laba, Umanis, Paniron, Coma of Pujut, Indra, Urungan, Raksasa
Bengali	29 Asharh, BS 1433
Chinese	Yang Earth Rat・Net Mansion; Fire Horse Year, Month 5, Day 29 (Xiaoshu, 10 days until Dashu)
Common Era	13 July 2026 CE
Coptic	6 Epip, AM 1742
Egyptian	28 Athyr, 2775 NE
Ethiopian	6 Ḥamlē, 2018 Amätä Məhrät
French Republican	Décade III, Quintidi de Messidor de l'Année 234 de la République
Gregorian	13 July, AD 2026
Hebrew	28 Tamuz, AM 5786
Hindu	Ārdrā・Dhruva; Solar: 29 Āṣāḍha, 1948 SE; Lunisolar: Caturdaśī, Kṛishna pakṣa of Jyeṣṭha, 2083 VE; Rāudra・5127 KY・1,872,769
Icelandic	Mánudagur, 22 Sólmánuður 2026
Islamic	27 Muharram, AH 1448 (using tabular method)
ISO week date	2026-W29-1
Japanese	29 Satsuki, Reiwa 8 (Shōsho, 10 days until Taisho)
Julian	30 June, AD 2026 (AM 7534)
Julian day	2461235
Korean	29 Maldal, 4359 DE
Maya	13.0.13.13.12; 5 Xul, 3 Eb
Roman	Pridie Kalendas Iulias, MMDCCLXXIX AUC
Solar Hijri	22 Tir, SH 1405
Tibetan	29 snron, me pho rta 2153 or 1772 or 1000

<<	July					>>
Su	Mo	Tu	We	Th	Fr	Sa
			1	2	3	4
5	6	7	8	9	10	11
12	13	14	15	16	17	18
19	20	21	22	23	24	25
26	27	28	29	30	31
2026

July 13 in recent years
2026 (Monday)
2025 (Sunday)
2024 (Saturday)
2023 (Thursday)
2022 (Wednesday)
2021 (Tuesday)
2020 (Monday)
2019 (Saturday)
2018 (Friday)
2017 (Thursday)

July 13 is the 194th day of the year (195th in leap years) in the Gregorian calendar; 171 days remain until the end of the year.

== Events ==
=== Pre-1600 ===
- 1174 – William I of Scotland, a key rebel in the Revolt of 1173–74, is captured at Alnwick by forces loyal to Henry II of England.
- 1249 – Coronation of Alexander III as King of Scots.
- 1260 – The Livonian Order suffers its greatest defeat in the 13th century in the Battle of Durbe against the Grand Duchy of Lithuania.
- 1402 – Nanjing surrenders to Zhu Di without a fight, ending the Jingnan campaign. The Jianwen Emperor disappears and his family is incarcerated.
- 1558 – Battle of Gravelines: In France, Spanish forces led by Count Lamoral of Egmont defeat the French forces of Marshal Paul de Thermes at Gravelines.
- 1573 – Eighty Years' War: The Siege of Haarlem ends after seven months.
- 1586 – Anglo–Spanish War: A convoy of English ships from the Levant Company manage to repel a fleet of eleven Spanish and Maltese galleys off the Mediterranean island of Pantelleria.

=== 1601–1900 ===
- 1643 – English Civil War: Battle of Roundway Down: In England, Henry Wilmot, 1st Earl of Rochester, commanding the Royalist forces, heavily defeats the Parliamentarian forces led by Sir William Waller.
- 1690 – Nine Years' War: French naval forces led by Anne Hilarion de Tourville, fresh from their victory at Beachy Head, sail West and launch a raid on the small English town of Teignmouth, leaving it devastated.
- 1787 – The Congress of the Confederation enacts the Northwest Ordinance establishing governing rules for the Northwest Territory. It also establishes procedures for the admission of new states and limits the expansion of slavery.
- 1794 – The Battle of Trippstadt between French forces and those of Prussia and Austria begins.
- 1798 – The French Armée d'Orient under Napoleon Bonaparte defeats a Mamluk army under Murad Bey in battle of Shubra Khit.
- 1814 – The Carabinieri, the national gendarmerie of Italy, is established.
- 1830 – The General Assembly's Institution, now the Scottish Church College, one of the pioneering institutions that ushered the Bengali Renaissance, is founded by Alexander Duff and Raja Ram Mohan Roy, in Calcutta, India.
- 1831 – Regulamentul Organic, a quasi-constitutional organic law, is adopted in Wallachia, one of the two Danubian Principalities that were to become the basis of Romania.
- 1841 – Austria, Britain, France, Prussia and Russia conclude the London Straits Convention, which forbids warships to cross the Bosporus and Dardanelles in times of war.
- 1849 – The Charleston Workhouse Slave Rebellion begins in Charleston, South Carolina, United States.
- 1854 – In the Battle of Guaymas, Mexico, General José María Yáñez stops the French invasion led by Count Gaston de Raousset-Boulbon.
- 1863 – American Civil War: The New York City draft riots begin three days of rioting which will later be regarded as the worst in United States history.
- 1878 – Treaty of Berlin: The European powers redraw the map of the Balkans. Serbia, Montenegro and Romania become completely independent of the Ottoman Empire.

=== 1901–present ===
- 1913 – The 1913 Romanian Army cholera outbreak during the Second Balkan War starts.
- 1914 – Felix Ysagun Manalo registers the Iglesia ni Cristo (Church of Christ) as Iglesia ni Kristo with the government of the Philippines.
- 1919 – The British airship R34 lands in Norfolk, England, completing the first airship return journey across the Atlantic in 182 hours of flight.
- 1930 – The inaugural FIFA World Cup begins in Uruguay.
- 1941 – World War II: Montenegrins begin the Trinaestojulski ustanak (Thirteenth of July Uprising), a popular revolt against the Axis powers.
- 1951 – Vuoristorata, one of the oldest still-operating wooden roller coasters in Europe, is opened at the Linnanmäki amusement park in Helsinki, Finland.
- 1956 – The Dartmouth workshop is the first conference on artificial intelligence.
- 1962 – In an unprecedented action, British Prime Minister Harold Macmillan dismisses seven members of his Cabinet, marking the effective end of the National Liberals as a distinct force within British politics.
- 1973 – Watergate scandal: Alexander Butterfield reveals the existence of a secret Oval Office taping system to investigators for the Senate Watergate Committee.
- 1977 – Somalia declares war on Ethiopia, starting the Ogaden War.
- 1977 – Amidst a period of financial and social turmoil, New York City experiences an electrical blackout lasting nearly 24 hours that leads to widespread fires and looting.
- 1985 – The Live Aid benefit concert takes place in London and Philadelphia, as well as other venues such as Moscow and Sydney.
- 1985 – Vice President George H. W. Bush becomes the Acting President for the day when President Ronald Reagan undergoes surgery to remove polyps from his colon.
- 1990 – Lenin Peak disaster: a 6.4-magnitude earthquake in Afghanistan triggers an avalanche on Lenin Peak, killing 43 climbers in the deadliest mountaineering disaster in history.
- 1995 – Space Shuttle Discovery is launched on STS-70 to deploy the TDRS-7 satellite.
- 2003 – French DGSE personnel abort an operation to rescue Íngrid Betancourt from FARC rebels in Colombia, causing a political scandal when details are leaked to the press.
- 2008 – Battle of Wanat begins when Taliban and al-Qaeda guerrillas attack US Army and Afghan National Army troops in Afghanistan. The U.S. deaths were, at that time, the most in a single battle since the beginning of operations in 2001.
- 2011 – Mumbai is rocked by three bomb blasts during the evening rush hour, killing 26 and injuring 130.
- 2011 – United Nations Security Council Resolution 1999 is adopted, which admits South Sudan to member status of United Nations.
- 2011 – Noar Linhas Aéreas Flight 4896 crashes in Boa Viagem, Recife, killing all 16 people on board.
- 2013 – Typhoon Soulik kills at least nine people and affects more than 160 million in East China and Taiwan.
- 2014 – Germany wins the FIFA World Cup, defeating Argentina in the final 1–0 after extra time.
- 2016 – Prime Minister of the United Kingdom David Cameron resigns, and is succeeded by Theresa May.
- 2020 – After a five-day search, the body of American actress and singer Naya Rivera is recovered from Lake Piru in California, where she had drowned.
- 2024 – Former president of the United States Donald Trump is injured in an assassination attempt while speaking at an election campaign rally near Butler, Pennsylvania.

== Births ==
=== Pre-1600 ===
- 1470 – Francesco Armellini Pantalassi de' Medici, Catholic cardinal (died 1528)
- 1478 – Giulio d'Este, illegitimate son of Italian noble (died 1561)
- 1527 – John Dee, English-Welsh mathematician, philosopher, astronomer, and astrologer (died 1609)
- 1579 – Arthur Dee, English physician and chemist (died 1651)
- 1590 – Pope Clement X (died 1676)

=== 1601–1900 ===
- 1606 – Roland Fréart de Chambray (died 1676)
- 1607 – Wenceslaus Hollar, Czech-English painter and illustrator (died 1677)
- 1608 – Ferdinand III, Holy Roman Emperor (died 1657)
- 1745 – Robert Calder, Scottish-English admiral (died 1818)
- 1756 – Thomas Rowlandson, English artist and caricaturist (died 1827)
- 1760 – István Pauli, Hungarian-Slovene priest and poet (died 1829)
- 1770 – Alexander Balashov, Russian general and politician, Russian Minister of Police (died 1837)
- 1793 – John Clare, English poet and author (died 1864)
- 1821 – Nathan Bedford Forrest, American general and first Grand Wizard of the Ku Klux Klan (died 1877)
- 1831 – Arthur Böttcher, German pathologist and anatomist (died 1889)
- 1841 – Otto Wagner, Austrian architect, designed the Austrian Postal Savings Bank and Karlsplatz Stadtbahn Station (died 1918)
- 1851 – Marie Andrieu, French anarchist, cartomancer and spiritualist (died 1911)
- 1858 – Stewart Culin, American ethnographer and author (died 1929)
- 1859 – Sidney Webb, 1st Baron Passfield, English economist and politician, Secretary of State for the Colonies (died 1947)
- 1863 – Margaret Murray, British archaeologist, anthropologist, historian, and folklorist (died 1963)
- 1864 – John Jacob Astor IV, American colonel and businessman (died 1912)
- 1877 – Robert Henry Mathews, Australian linguist and missionary (died 1970)
- 1884 – Yrjö Saarela, Finnish wrestler and coach (died 1951)
- 1886 – Father Edward J. Flanagan, founder of Boys Town (died 1948)
- 1889 – Emma Asson, Estonian educator and politician (died 1965)
- 1889 – Stan Coveleski, American baseball player (died 1984)
- 1892 – Léo-Pol Morin, Canadian pianist, composer, and educator (died 1941)
- 1892 – Jonni Myyrä, Finnish-American discus and javelin thrower (died 1955)
- 1894 – Isaac Babel, Russian short story writer, journalist, and playwright (died 1940)
- 1895 – Sidney Blackmer, American actor (died 1973)
- 1896 – Mordecai Ardon, Israeli painter and educator (died 1992)
- 1898 – Julius Schreck, German commander (died 1936)
- 1898 – Ivan Triesault, Estonian-born American actor (died 1980)
- 1900 – George Lewis, American clarinet player and songwriter (died 1969)

=== 1901–present ===
- 1901 – Eric Portman, English actor (died 1969)
- 1903 – Kenneth Clark, English historian and author (died 1983)
- 1905 – Alfredo M. Santos, Filipino general (died 1990)
- 1905 – Eugenio Pagnini, Italian modern pentathlete (died 1993)
- 1905 – Magda Foy, American child actress (died 2000)
- 1908 – Dorothy Round, English tennis player (died 1982)
- 1908 – Tim Spencer, American country & western singer-songwriter and actor (died 1974)
- 1909 – Souphanouvong, 1st President of Laos (died 1995)
- 1910 – Lien Gisolf, Dutch high jumper (died 1993)
- 1913 – Dave Garroway, American journalist and television personality (died 1982)
- 1913 – Mærsk Mc-Kinney Møller, Danish businessman (died 2012)
- 1915 – Kaoru Ishikawa, Japanese author and educator (died 1989)
- 1918 – Alberto Ascari, Italian racing driver (died 1955)
- 1918 – Marcia Brown, American author and illustrator (died 2015)
- 1919 – Hau Pei-tsun, 13th Premier of the Republic of China (died 2020)
- 1919 – William F. Quinn, American lawyer (died 2006)
- 1921 – Ernest Gold, Austrian-American composer and conductor (died 1999)
- 1922 – Leslie Brooks, American actress (died 2011)
- 1922 – Anker Jørgensen, Danish trade union leader and politician, 16th Prime Minister of Denmark (died 2016)
- 1922 – Helmy Afify Abd El-Bar, Egyptian military commander (died 2011)
- 1922 – Ken Mosdell, Canadian ice hockey player (died 2006)
- 1923 – Ashley Bryan, American children's book author and illustrator (died 2022)
- 1923 – Colonel James H. Harvey, US Army Air Force (later US Air Force) fighter pilot and Tuskegee Airman.
- 1925 – Suzanne Zimmerman, American competition swimmer and Olympic medalist (died 2021)
- 1925 – Huang Zongying, Chinese actress and writer (died 2020)
- 1926 – Robert H. Justman, American director, producer, and production manager (died 2008)
- 1926 – T. Loren Christianson, American politician (died 2019)
- 1926 – Thomas Clark, American politician (died 2020)
- 1927 – Simone Veil, French lawyer and politician, President of the European Parliament (died 2017)
- 1927 – Ian Reed, Australian discus thrower (died 2020)
- 1928 – Bob Crane, American actor (died 1978)
- 1928 – Sven Davidson, Swedish-American tennis player (died 2008)
- 1928 – Johnny Gilbert, American game show host and announcer
- 1928 – Al Rex, American musician (died 2020)
- 1929 – Sofia Muratova, Russian gymnast (died 2006)
- 1929 – Svein Ellingsen, Norwegian visual artist and hymnist (died 2020)
- 1930 – Sam Greenlee, American author and poet (died 2014)
- 1930 – Naomi Shemer, Israeli singer-songwriter (died 2004)
- 1931 – Frank Ramsey, American basketball player and coach (died 2018)
- 1932 – Hubert Reeves, Canadian-French astrophysicist and author (died 2023)
- 1932 – Per Nørgård, Danish composer and music theorist (died 2025)
- 1933 – David Storey, English author, playwright, and screenwriter (died 2017)
- 1933 – Piero Manzoni, Italian artist (died 1963)
- 1934 – Peter Gzowski, Canadian journalist and academic (died 2002)
- 1934 – Gordon Lee, English footballer and manager (died 2022)
- 1934 – Wole Soyinka, Nigerian author, poet, and playwright, Nobel Prize laureate
- 1934 – Aleksei Yeliseyev, Russian engineer and astronaut
- 1935 – Jack Kemp, American football player and politician, 9th United States Secretary of Housing and Urban Development (died 2009)
- 1935 – Earl Lovelace, Trinidadian journalist, author, and playwright
- 1935 – Kurt Westergaard, Danish cartoonist (died 2021)
- 1936 – Albert Ayler, American saxophonist and composer (died 1970)
- 1937 – Ghillean Prance, English botanist and ecologist
- 1939 – Lambert Jackson Woodburne, South African admiral (died 2013)
- 1940 – Tom Lichtenberg, American football player and coach (died 2013)
- 1940 – Paul Prudhomme, American chef and author (died 2015)
- 1940 – Patrick Stewart, English actor, director, and producer (died 2026)
- 1941 – Grahame Corling, Australian cricketer
- 1941 – Robert Forster, American actor and producer (died 2019)
- 1941 – Ehud Manor, Israeli songwriter and translator (died 2005)
- 1941 – Jacques Perrin, French actor, director, and producer (died 2022)
- 1942 – Harrison Ford, American actor and producer
- 1942 – Roger McGuinn, American singer-songwriter and guitarist
- 1943 – Chris Serle, English journalist and actor (died 2024)
- 1944 – Eric Freeman, Australian cricketer (died 2020)
- 1944 – Cyril Knowles, English footballer and manager (died 1991)
- 1944 – Ernő Rubik, Hungarian game designer, architect, and educator, invented the Rubik's Cube
- 1945 – Ashley Mallett, Australian cricketer and author (died 2021)
- 1946 – Bob Kauffman, American basketball player and coach (died 2015)
- 1946 – Cheech Marin, American actor and comedian
- 1948 – Catherine Breillat, French director and screenwriter
- 1948 – Tony Kornheiser, American television sports talk show host and former sportswriter
- 1949 – Bryan Murray, Irish actor
- 1950 – George Nelson, American astronomer and astronaut
- 1950 – Ma Ying-jeou, Hong Kong-Taiwanese commander and politician, 12th President of the Republic of China
- 1950 – Jurelang Zedkaia, Marshallese politician, 5th President of the Marshall Islands (died 2015)
- 1951 – Rob Bishop, American educator and politician
- 1951 – Didi Conn, American actress and singer
- 1953 – Gil Birmingham, American actor
- 1953 – Mila Mulroney, Chancellor of St. Francis Xavier University, wife of former Canadian prime minister Brian Mulroney
- 1953 – David Thompson, American basketball player
- 1954 – Ray Bright, Australian cricketer
- 1954 – Louise Mandrell, American singer-songwriter and actress
- 1956 – Mark Mendoza, American bass player and songwriter
- 1956 – Michael Spinks, American boxer
- 1957 – Thierry Boutsen, Belgian racing driver and businessman
- 1957 – Cameron Crowe, American director, producer, and screenwriter
- 1959 – Richard Leman, English field hockey player
- 1959 – Fuziah Salleh, Malaysian politician
- 1960 – Ian Hislop, Welsh-English journalist and screenwriter
- 1961 – Tahira Asif, Pakistani politician (died 2014)
- 1961 – Anders Jarryd, Swedish tennis player
- 1961 – Khalid Mahmood, Pakistani-English engineer and politician
- 1961 – Stelios Manolas, Greek footballer and manager
- 1961 – Tim Watson, Australian footballer, coach, and journalist
- 1962 – Tom Kenny, American voice actor and screenwriter
- 1962 – Rhonda Vincent, American singer-songwriter and mandolin player
- 1963 – Parker Bohn III, American bowler
- 1963 – Neal Foulds, English snooker player and sportscaster
- 1963 – Kenny Johnson, American actor, producer, and model
- 1965 – Eileen Ivers, American fiddler
- 1965 – Akina Nakamori, Japanese singer and actress
- 1965 – Colin van der Voort, Australian rugby league player
- 1966 – Gerald Levert, American R&B singer-songwriter, producer, and actor (died 2006)
- 1966 – Natalia Luis-Bassa, Venezuelan-English conductor and educator
- 1967 – Richard Marles, Australian lawyer and politician, 50th Australian Minister for Trade and Investment
- 1967 – Mark McGowan, Australian politician, 30th Premier of Western Australia
- 1969 – José Andrés, Chef, Restaurateur, and Entrepreneur
- 1969 – Brad Godden, Australian rugby league player
- 1969 – Ken Jeong, American actor, comedian, and physician
- 1969 – Oleg Serebrian, Moldovan political scientist and politician
- 1970 – Andrei Tivontchik, German pole vaulter and trainer
- 1971 – MF Doom, English-American rapper (died 2020)
- 1971 – Mark Neeld, Australian footballer and coach
- 1972 – Sean Waltman, American professional wrestler
- 1974 – Deborah Cox, Canadian singer-songwriter and actress
- 1974 – Jarno Trulli, Italian racing driver
- 1975 – Diego Spotorno, Ecuadorian actor
- 1975 – Mariada Pieridi, Cypriot singer-songwriter
- 1976 – Sheldon Souray, Canadian ice hockey player
- 1978 – Ryan Ludwick, American baseball player
- 1978 – Prodromos Nikolaidis, Greek basketball player
- 1979 – Craig Bellamy, Welsh footballer
- 1979 – Daniel Díaz, Argentinian footballer
- 1979 – Libuše Průšová, Czech tennis player
- 1979 – Lucinda Ruh, Swiss figure skater and coach
- 1981 – Ágnes Kovács, Hungarian swimmer
- 1981 – Masyita Crystallin, Indonesian economist
- 1981 – Mirco Lorenzetto, Italian cyclist
- 1982 – Shin-Soo Choo, South Korean baseball player
- 1982 – Simon Clist, English footballer
- 1982 – Dominic Isaacs, South African footballer
- 1982 – Nick Kenny, Australian rugby league player
- 1982 – Yadier Molina, Puerto Rican baseball player
- 1983 – Kristof Beyens, Belgian sprinter
- 1983 – Marco Pomante, Italian footballer
- 1983 – Liu Xiang, Chinese hurdler
- 1984 – Ida Maria, Norwegian singer-songwriter and guitarist
- 1984 – Faf du Plessis, South African professional cricketer
- 1985 – Trell Kimmons, American sprinter
- 1985 – Guillermo Ochoa, Mexican footballer
- 1985 – Charlotte Dujardin, English equestrian
- 1985 – Abdallah El Said, Egyptian footballer
- 1988 – Marcos Paulo Gelmini Gomes, Brazilian-Italian footballer
- 1988 – Colton Haynes, American actor, model and singer
- 1988 – DJ LeMahieu, American baseball player
- 1988 – Raúl Spank, German high jumper
- 1988 – Tulisa, English singer-songwriter and actress
- 1989 – Leon Bridges, American soul singer, songwriter and record producer
- 1989 – Charis Giannopoulos, Greek basketball player
- 1990 – Kieran Foran, New Zealand rugby league player
- 1990 – Eduardo Salvio, Argentinian footballer
- 1991 – Tyler Skaggs, American baseball player (died 2019)
- 1992 – Rich the Kid, American rapper
- 1992 – Elise Matthysen, Belgian swimmer
- 1993 – Dan Bentley, English footballer
- 1993 – Yebin, South Korean singer-songwriter and composer
- 1995 – Cody Bellinger, American baseball player
- 1995 – Dante Exum, Australian basketball player
- 1997 – Josh Hines-Allen, American football player
- 1997 – Leo Howard, American actor and martial artist
- 2001 – Kim Sin-jin, South Korean footballer
- 2002 – Deborah Medrado, Brazilian rhythmic gymnast
- 2003 – Wyatt Oleff, American actor
- 2003 – Mason Teague, Australian rugby league player
- 2004 – Nihal Sarin, Indian Chess Grandmaster
- 2007 – Lamine Yamal, Spanish footballer

== Deaths ==
=== Pre-1600 ===
- 574 – John III, pope of the Catholic Church
- 716 – Rui Zong, Chinese emperor (born 662)
- 815 – Wu Yuanheng, Chinese poet and politician (born 758)
- 884 – Huang Chao, Chinese rebel leader (born 835)
- 939 – Leo VII, pope of the Catholic Church
- 982 – Gunther, margrave of Merseburg
- 982 – Henry I, bishop of Augsburg
- 982 – Pandulf II, Lombard prince
- 982 – Landulf IV, Lombard prince
- 982 – Abu'l-Qasim, Kalbid emir of Sicily
- 1024 – Henry II, Holy Roman Emperor (born 973)
- 1105 – Rashi, French rabbi and commentator (born 1040)
- 1205 – Hubert Walter, English archbishop and politician, Lord Chancellor of The United Kingdom (born 1160)
- 1357 – Bartolus de Saxoferrato Italian academic and jurist (born 1313)
- 1380 – Bertrand du Guesclin, French nobleman and knight (born 1320)
- 1399 – Peter Parler, German architect, designed St. Vitus Cathedral and Charles Bridge (born 1330)
- 1491 – Afonso, Portuguese prince (born 1475)
- 1551 – John Wallop, English soldier and diplomat (born 1490)

=== 1601–1900 ===
- 1617 – Adam Wenceslaus, duke of Cieszyn (born 1574)
- 1621 – Albert VII, archduke of Austria (born 1559)
- 1626 – Robert Sidney, 1st Earl of Leicester, English politician (born 1563)
- 1628 – Robert Shirley, English soldier and diplomat (born 1581)
- 1629 – Caspar Bartholin the Elder, Swedish physician and theologian (born 1585)
- 1683 – Arthur Capell, 1st Earl of Essex, English politician, Lord Lieutenant of Ireland (born 1631)
- 1755 – Edward Braddock, Scottish general (born 1695)
- 1762 – James Bradley, English priest and astronomer (born 1693)
- 1789 – Victor de Riqueti, marquis de Mirabeau, French economist and academic (born 1715)
- 1793 – Jean-Paul Marat, Swiss-French physician, scientist and theorist (born 1743)
- 1807 – Henry Benedict Stuart, Italian cardinal, pretender to the British throne and last member of the House of Stuart (born 1725)
- 1881 – John C. Pemberton, American general (born 1814)
- 1889 – Robert Hamerling, Austrian author, poet, and playwright (born 1830)
- 1890 – John C. Frémont, American general and politician, 5th Territorial Governor of Arizona (born 1813)
- 1890 – Johann Voldemar Jannsen, Estonian journalist and poet (born 1819)
- 1893 – They Even Fear His Horses, American tribal chief (born 1836)
- 1896 – August Kekulé, German chemist and academic (born 1829)

=== 1901–present ===
- 1907 – Henrik Sillem, Dutch target shooter and jurist (born 1866)
- 1911 – Allan McLean, Scottish-Australian politician, 19th Premier of Victoria (born 1840)
- 1921 – Gabriel Lippmann, Luxembourger physicist and academic, Nobel Prize laureate (born 1845)
- 1922 – Martin Dies Sr., American journalist and politician (born 1870)
- 1927 – Mimar Kemaleddin Bey, Turkish architect and academic, designed the Tayyare Apartments (born 1870)
- 1934 – Mary E. Byrd, American astronomer and academic (born 1849)
- 1936 – Kojo Tovalou Houénou, Beninese lawyer and politician (born 1887)
- 1941 – Ilmar Raud, Estonian chess player (born 1913)
- 1945 – Alla Nazimova, Russian-American actress, producer, and screenwriter (born 1879)
- 1946 – Alfred Stieglitz, American photographer and curator (born 1864)
- 1949 – Walt Kuhn, American painter and academic (born 1877)
- 1951 – Arnold Schoenberg, Austrian-American composer and painter (born 1874)
- 1954 – Frida Kahlo, Mexican painter and educator (born 1907)
- 1960 – Joy Davidman, American-English poet and author (born 1915)
- 1965 – Photis Kontoglou, Greek painter, illustrator and writer (born 1895)
- 1967 – Tom Simpson, English cyclist (born 1937)
- 1970 – Leslie Groves, American general and engineer, head of the Manhattan Project (born 1896)
- 1970 – Sheng Shicai, Chinese warlord (born 1895)
- 1973 – Willy Fritsch, German actor and screenwriter (born 1901)
- 1974 – Patrick Blackett, Baron Blackett, English physicist and academic, Nobel Prize laureate (born 1897)
- 1976 – Frederick Hawksworth, English engineer (born 1884)
- 1979 – Ludwig Merwart, Austrian painter and illustrator (born 1913)
- 1980 – Seretse Khama, Botswana lawyer and politician, 1st President of Botswana (born 1921)
- 1981 – Martin Hurson, Irish Republican, died on hunger strike (born 1956)
- 1983 – Gabrielle Roy, Canadian engineer and author (born 1909)
- 1993 – Davey Allison, American race car driver (born 1961)
- 1995 – Godtfred Kirk Christiansen, Danish businessman (born 1920)
- 1996 – Pandro S. Berman, American director, producer, and production manager (born 1905)
- 1997 – Miguel Ángel Blanco, Spanish politician (born 1968)
- 1999 – Konstantinos Kollias, Greek general and politician, 168th Prime Minister of Greece (born 1901)
- 2000 – Jan Karski, Polish-American activist and academic (born 1914)
- 2003 – Compay Segundo, Cuban singer-songwriter and guitarist (born 1907)
- 2005 – Robert E. Ogren, American zoologist (born 1922)
- 2006 – Red Buttons, American actor (born 1919)
- 2007 – Michael Reardon, American mountaineer (born 1965)
- 2008 – Bronisław Geremek, Polish historian and politician, Polish Minister of Foreign Affairs (born 1932)
- 2010 – Manohari Singh, Indian saxophonist and composer (born 1931)
- 2010 – George Steinbrenner, American businessman (born 1930)
- 2011 – Allan Jeans, Australian footballer and coach (born 1933)
- 2012 – Warren Jabali, American basketball player (born 1946)
- 2012 – Jerzy Kulej, Polish boxer and politician (born 1940)
- 2012 – Richard D. Zanuck, American film producer (born 1934)
- 2013 – Leonard Garment, American lawyer and public servant, 14th White House Counsel (born 1924)
- 2013 – Henri Julien, French race car driver (born 1927)
- 2013 – Cory Monteith, Canadian actor and singer (born 1982)
- 2013 – Ottavio Quattrocchi, Italian businessman (born 1938)
- 2013 – Vernon B. Romney, American lawyer and politician, 14th Attorney General of Utah (born 1924)
- 2013 – Marc Simont, French-American author and illustrator (born 1915)
- 2014 – Thomas Berger, American author and playwright (born 1924)
- 2014 – Alfred de Grazia, American political scientist, author, and academic (born 1919)
- 2014 – Nadine Gordimer, South African novelist, short story writer, and activist, Nobel Prize laureate (born 1923)
- 2014 – Jeff Leiding, American football player (born 1961)
- 2014 – Lorin Maazel, French-American violinist, composer, and conductor (born 1930)
- 2015 – Philipp Mißfelder, German historian and politician (born 1979)
- 2015 – Martin Litchfield West, English scholar, author, and academic (born 1927)
- 2017 – Liu Xiaobo, Chinese literary critic, human rights activist (born 1955)
- 2020 – Grant Imahara, American electrical engineer, roboticist, and television host (born 1970)
- 2020 – Zindzi Mandela, South African politician, diplomat, and third daughter of Nelson Mandela (born 1960)
- 2024 – Shannen Doherty, American actress (born 1971)
- 2024 – Ruth Hesse, German opera singer (born 1936)
- 2024 – Richard Simmons, American fitness personality and public figure (born 1948)
- 2024 – Chino Trinidad, Filipino sports journalist and executive (born 1967)
- 2024 – Thomas Matthew Crooks, American student, known for attempting to assassinate former US President Donald Trump (born 2003)
- 2024 – Naomi Pomeroy, American chef and restaurateur (born 1974)
- 2025 – Muhammadu Buhari, Nigerian general and politician, 7th & 15th President of Nigeria (born 1942)
- 2026 – Sam Neill, New Zealand actor (born 1947)

== Holidays and observances ==
- Christian feast day:
  - Abd-al-Masih
  - Abel of Tacla Haimonot (Coptic Church)
  - Clelia Barbieri
  - Conrad Weiser (Episcopal Church (USA))
  - Eugenius of Carthage
  - Henry II, Holy Roman Emperor
  - Jacobus de Voragine
  - Blessed Mariano de Jesús Euse Hoyos
  - Mildrith of Thanet
  - Our Lady Mystical Rose
  - Silas (Catholic Church)
  - Teresa of Los Andes
  - July 13 (Eastern Orthodox liturgics)
- Statehood Day (Montenegro)
- Kashmir Martyrs' Day (Pakistan)
