= Janet Lowe =

American financial writer and journalist (1940–2019)

- Born: Janet Celesta Lowe; May 15, 1940; Santa Rosa, California, U.S.
- Died: December 31, 2019 (aged 79); San Diego, California
- Education: University of Nevada at Las Vegas (BBA); University of San Diego (M.A.)
- Occupations: Journalist, newspaper editor, writer.
- Writing career
- Genre: Financial biography

Janet Celesta Lowe (May 15, 1940 – December 31, 2019) was an American journalist, newspaper editor, and writer.

== Biography ==
Lowe was born May 15, 1940, in Santa Rosa, California, to Celesta and Deke Lowe. She worked as production assistant or producer for several television stations, usually in their news departments. She then positioned herself as a marketing resource for television stations, preparing regular newsletters, providing web pages, and web content, and holding workshops for station workers.

== University experience ==
Lowe has taught in the University of California (San Diego) as an Investments and Journalism Professor.

== Published works ==
Lowe has been business editor of the San Diego Tribune and editor of the San Diego Daily Transcript. She has been published in Newsweek, Los Angeles Times, Dallas Morning News, San Jose Mercury News, Modern Maturity and other national magazines. She specializes in writing books about business leaders.

=== Speaks books ===
- 1998: Bill Gates Speaks: Insights from the World's Greatest Entrepreneur
- 1999: Ted Turner Speaks: Insights from the World's Greatest Maverick
- 2001: Oprah Winfrey Speaks: Insights from the World's Most Influential Voice
- 2007: Warren Buffett Speaks: Wit and Wisdom from the World's Greatest Investor
- 2009: Google Speaks: Secrets of the World's Greatest Billionaire Entrepreneurs, Sergey Brin and Larry Page

=== Other books ===
- 1988: Dividends Don't Lie: Finding Value in Blue-Chip Stocks co-authored with Geraldine Weiss
- 1996: Benjamin Graham on Value Investing
- 1996: Value investing Made Easy
- 2000: Damn Right! Behind the Scenes with Berkshire Hathaway Billionaire Charlie Munger
