= Celesta Lowe =

American historian and librarian

- Lowe in 1965
- Born: Celesta Adelaid Lisle; 1917
- Died: December 9, 2004
- Occupations: writer and librarian
- Children: 4, including Janet Lowe

Celesta Lowe (née Lisle) (1917–2004) was an American historian, columnist and librarian. She was the first director of the University of Nevada, Las Vegas library's special collections.

Lowe was born in Nevada in 1917. Lowe's mother, Celestia A. Lisle, was born in Payson, Utah, and married John Quincy Lisle in 1907. Lowe moved with her family to California as a child and graduated from El Monte High School in 1934. She married David Walker "Deke" Lowe in Nevada in 1935 and the couple went on to own and operate the Goodsprings Hotel. Together they had several children, including author Janet Lowe.

Lowe founded the Southern Nevada Historical Society in 1959 with Maryellen Vallier Sadovich. In 1961 Lowe was appointed as a library technician at the southern division of the University of Nevada. She had previously worked at the Nevada State Library Department. Lowe was named the head of the UNLV special collections department when it was founded in 1967.

In addition to her work at the UNLV, Lowe wrote for numerous magazines including Desert Magazine, Nevada Highways, and Westways. She also authored two long-running columns – Echoes from the Archives" and "Southwestern Bookshelf" – for the Las Vegas Review Journal.

Lowe died December 9, 2004, in Henderson, Nevada, at the age of 87. In 2007 was named to the Roll of Honour of the Nevada's Women's History Project. The Celeste Lowe papers are held by the UNLV's Special Collections and Archives.
