= Max Levy =

Max Levy (March 9, 1857 – July 30, 1926) was an American inventor and scientist recognized for invention of precision machinery for the making of half-tone screens which were used in the production of relief printing plates by newspapers and magazines. The New York Times called Levy "one of the pioneers of photo-engraving". He was also the inventor of the counting chamber for haemocytometer for which he received the Edward Longstreth medal from the Franklin Institute.
