= 1926 in American television =

This is a list of American television-related events in 1926.

== Events ==
- May 11 – AT&T centralized its radio operations into a new subsidiary known as the Broadcasting Company of America (BCA). Although not widely known at the time, this was done in anticipation of selling the radio network, the result of a management decision that the radio operations were incompatible with the company's primary role as the leading U.S. supplier of telephone services.
- May 27 - The television pioneer Philo Farnsworth married Elma "Pem" Gardner. The couple soon traveled to Berkeley, California, where Farnsworth continued his experiments.
- July 22 - A few weeks after AT&T consolidated its radio operations into the Broadcasting Company of America subsidiary, it agreed to sell BCA's assets to RCA for approximately $1 million (equivalent to $17.8 million in 2024), a deal made public on that day.
- July 28 - In a separate deal, WCAP was sold to RCA, with its broadcast hours ceded to time-share partner WRC three days later. While the deal was criticized for granting RCA a monopoly on broadcasting, a charge RCA denied, then-Secretary of Commerce Herbert Hoover declined to publicly comment; Chief Radio Supervisor W. D. Terrell stated that neither he or anyone else in the Commerce Department had legal jurisdiction to reject the deal inasmuch as they could not prevent a store from selling bread or meat.
- September 13 - RCA chairman of the board Owen D. Young and president James G. Harbord announced the formation of the National Broadcasting Company, Inc., to begin operations upon RCA's acquisition of WEAF on November 15. A widely placed full-page company advertisement stated that: "The purpose of the National Broadcasting Company will be to provide the best program available for broadcasting in the United States. ... It is hoped that arrangements may be made so that every event of national importance may be broadcast widely throughout the United States."
- November 15 - NBC's network operations were officially launched with a gala broadcast beginning at 8 p.m. Eastern Time. In anticipation, one newspaper reported: "The most pretentious broadcasting program ever presented, featuring among other stars of the theatrical, concert and radio field, some of whom have never been heard on the air, will mark the introduction of the National Broadcasting company to the radio public Monday evening", with NBC president Merlin H. Aylesworth characterizing the event as "a four-hour program beginning at 8 p.m., which will live long in their memories as an occasion marking another milestone in the history of radio broadcasting". Carl Schlegel of the Metropolitan Opera opened the inaugural broadcast, which also featured Will Rogers and Mary Garden. This broadcast, which included a remote link from KYW in Chicago, was coordinated through WEAF, and carried by twenty-two eastern and Midwestern stations, located as far west as WDAF in Kansas City, Missouri. NBC is the first and oldest major broadcast network in the United States.

== Sources ==
- Banning, William Peck (1946). Commercial and Broadcasting Pioneer: The WEAF Experiment, 1922–1926 (PDF). Cambridge, Massachusetts: Harvard University Press. Archived (PDF) from the original on January 31, 2023 – via World Radio History.
