= Geraldine Weiss =

American investor and author (1926–2022)

- Born: Geraldine Schmulowitz; March 16, 1926; San Francisco, California, U.S.
- Died: April 25, 2022 (aged 96); San Diego, California, U.S.
- Education: University of California, Berkeley (1945)
- Occupations: Editor, investment advisor, investor, writer
- Years active: 1966–2002 at Investment Quality Trends
- Known for: Value investing through analyzing dividend yield
- Notable work: Dividends Don't Lie; The Dividend Connection
- Title: Managing Editor at Investment Quality Trends
- Website: iqtrends.com

Geraldine Weiss (March 16, 1926 – April 25, 2022) was an American editor, investment advisor, investor, and writer. She was the co-founder of the newsletter, Investment Quality Trends and was nicknamed "the Grande Dame of Dividends" and "The Dividend Detective" for her unconventional value approach investment style by focusing on a company's dividends rather than earnings.

As the co-author of Dividends Don't Lie and The Dividend Connection, Weiss popularized the theory of using dividend yield as a valuation metric by indicating that there is a strong relationship between a company's ability to pay dividends over time and the performance of the company in the stock market. Weiss is regarded as one of the most successful female investors in a traditionally male-dominated profession.

== Education and work ==
=== Education and early inspiration ===
Weiss was born in San Francisco on March 16, 1926, the daughter of Sylvia, a homemaker, and Alvin Schmulowitz, a real estate agent. She attended and graduated from the University of California, Berkeley, in 1945 with a degree in Business and Finance. Weiss's early interest in investing and finance stems from Benjamin Graham's 10-point checklist and his books Security Analysis and The Intelligent Investor.

=== Investment Quality Trends (1966–2002) ===
In 1962, Weiss began investing and attempted to find work as a stockbroker or an analyst. However, companies dismissed her request as they did not believe a female could be successful in this field. In 1966, at the age of 40, Weiss collaborated with Fred Whitmore and founded Investment Quality Trends, a newsletter. The establishment of Investment Quality Trends marked Weiss as the first woman to start an investment advisory service. Confident that she could make Investment Quality Trends successful, Weiss bought out Whitmore and managed the firm by herself. To avoid the perception held by investors that a woman could not invest successfully, Weiss signed her newsletter "G. Weiss" instead of "Geraldine Weiss" to mask her gender. The newsletter garnered significant success and created a loyal readership that generated profits off of her advice. In 1977, Weiss appeared on the popular talk show Wall Street Week with Louis Rukeyser and revealed that she was a woman. Although this came as a surprise to the readership at Investment Quality Trends, the subscribers "were making so much money that they really didn't care". Weiss garnered significant popularity throughout the years, earning herself the nickname "The Grande Dame of Dividends". The work done by Weiss has been published in illustrious finance publications including the Los Angeles Times, Fortune, Barron's, and The Wall Street Journal.

=== Retirement at investment quality trends (2003–2022) ===
After 36 years of conducting analysis and writing for Investment Quality Trends, Weiss handed over editorial duties to Kelley Wright. However, Weiss remained involved with the overall business strategy.

She died on April 25, 2022.

== Publications ==
Weiss is the co-author of Dividends Don't Lie: Finding Value in Blue-Chip Stocks (1988) and The Dividend Connection: How Dividends Create Value in the Stock Market (1995).

=== Dividends Don't Lie: Finding Value in Blue-Chip Stocks (1988) ===
Dividends Don't Lie: Finding Value in Blue-Chip Stocks was written by Geraldine Weiss and Janet Lowe and published in 1988. The book teaches a value-based approach to investing by using the dividend-yield theory as a means to produce consistent returns in the stock market. Rather than focusing on price cycles, company products, marketing strategy, and other factors, Weiss and Lowe place an emphasis on dividend-yield patterns as a means of evaluating a stock. The book is considered to be "the bible for dividend centric value investing".

A follow-up titled Dividends Still Don't Lie: The Truth About Investing in Blue Chip Stocks and Winning in the Stock Market was published by Kelley Wright, managing editor of Investment Quality Trends, in 2010.

=== The Dividend Connection: How Dividends Create Value in the Stock Market (1995) ===
The Dividend Connection: How Dividends Create Value in the Stock Market was written by Geraldine Weiss and Gregory Weiss and published in 1995. The book is aimed at providing investors with the self-confidence to make stock market choices without hesitation and uncertainty.

== Weiss's investment strategy ==
Weiss's investment strategy looks closely at a dividend's yield to determine value – a repetitively high yield would indicate an undervalued stock and a repetitively low yield would indicate an overvalued stock. Weiss has seven criteria to screen stocks with:

1. Whether the dividend yield is undervalued on a historical basis;
2. Whether the company has raised dividends at an annual compound rate of at least 10% in the past 12 years;
3. Whether the company is trading at a book value (BV) of two or less;
4. Whether the company has a P/E ratio of 20-to-1 or less;
5. Whether the dividend payout ratio is 50% or less;
6. Whether the debt is 50% or less of the company's total market capitalization;
7. Whether it meets the six blue chip criteria: (1) Dividends have been raised at least 5 times in the last 12 years, (2) has at least an "A" rating from S&P, (3) has at least 5 million shares outstanding, (4) has at least 80 institutional investors that hold the stock, (5) has at least 25 years of consistent dividends, and (6) has shown earnings improvement at least seven times in the last 12 years.

When a stock meets all seven of Weiss's criteria, the stock is categorized by Weiss as a "Buy".
