= Marco Pomante =

Italian football coach

Personal information
- Date of birth: 13 July 1983 (age 43)
- Place of birth: Atri, Italy
- Height: 1.82 m (6 ft 0 in)
- Position: Centre back

Youth career
- Pescara

Senior career*
Years	Team	Apps	(Gls)
2001–2011	Pescara	79	(0)
2003–2004	→ Fano (loan)	42	(1)
2006	→ Chieti (loan)	12	(0)
2006–2007	→ Giulianova (loan)	16	(0)
2007	→ Ravenna (loan)	2	(0)
2009–2010	→ Andria (loan)	28	(1)
2010–2011	→ Nocerina (loan)	24	(2)
2011–2012	Nocerina	26	(0)
2012–2015	L'Aquila	91	(8)
2015–2016	Viterbese	22	(1)
2016	Nocerina	10	(0)
2016–2019	Pineto	66	(7)
2019–2020	Notaresco	24	(4)
Total		442	(24)

International career
2005	Italy U21 Serie B	1	(0)

Managerial career
- 2020–2021: Pineto Giovanili
- 2021–2022: Pineto
- 2022–: Teramo
- * Club domestic league appearances and goals

Marco Pomante (born 13 July 1983) is an Italian football coach and former footballer who is currently as a head coach for Italian Serie D club Teramo.

== Career ==
=== Pescara ===
A youth product of Abruzzo team Pescara, Pomante was loaned to Fano in his early career. He returned to Pescara in 2004 and played a few Serie B matches. In January 2006 he left for Chieti. Despite taking the no.2 shirt from Stefano Di Berardino at the start of 2006–07 Serie B season, he left for Giulianova in August 2006 and Ravenna in January 2007

After Pescara relegated to Serie C1, Pomante returned to Pescara and was a regular starter of the team. He signed a new 3-year contract in April 2008. But on 31 August 2009 he left for Andria BAT of the same group. Pescara was promoted back to Serie B as the group A runner-up and Andria BAT was just able to survive by winning the relegation play-off of group A.

In August 2010 he was loaned to Prima Divisione newcomer Nocerina. He wore the no.83 shirt before he left the team.

=== International ===
He played once for Italy under-21 Serie B representative team against Bosnia and Herzegovina U21, as right back. U21 Serie B won the eastern neighbor 3–2.

== Honors ==
Ravenna

- Lega Pro Prima Divisione (1): 2007
