= Masyita Crystallin =

Indonesian economist

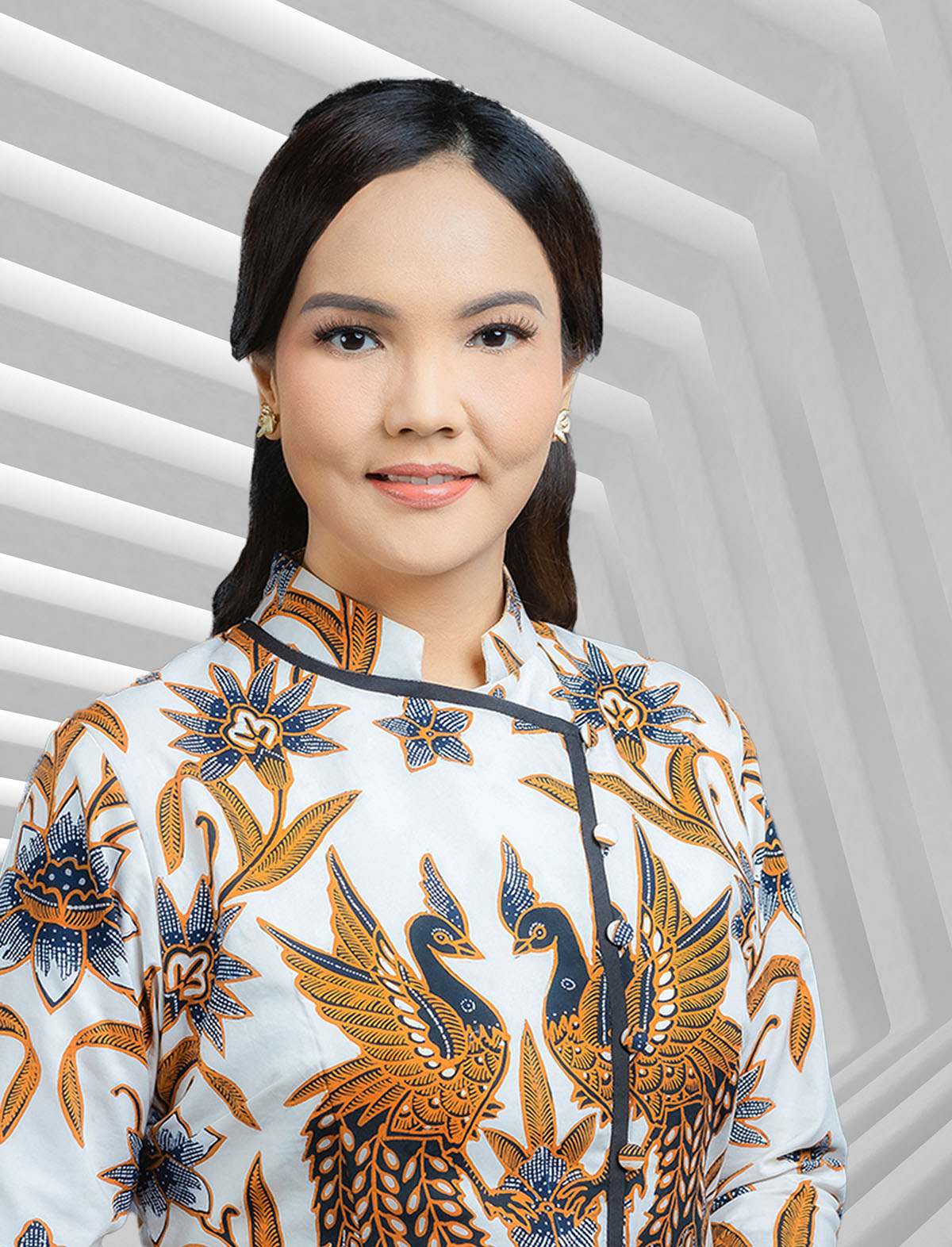

Director General of Financial Sector Stability and Development
- In office 23 May 2025 – 11 February 2026
- Preceded by: office established

Personal details
- Education: University of Indonesia (S.E.); Australian National University (MA); Claremont Graduate University (MA, Ph.D.)

Masyita Crystallin is an Indonesian economist who served as the director general of financial sector stability and development at the Ministry of Finance until 2026 when she was appointed to her current role as Head of Economic and ESG Strategic Positioning in Indonesia's largest sovereign wealth fund Danantara. Throughout her professional career, Masyita held roles both nationally and globally, including serving as special advisor to the finance minister for fiscal and macroeconomic policy and climate change.

== Early life ==
Masyita attended school in several locations in Jambi, including the hinterland village of Pelabuhan Dagang and the seaside Nipah Panjang district, before moving to the capital city of Jambi. She recalled that her parents were stationed in an area without electricity, and she was unable to attend kindergarten as one was not available. Upon moving to the provincial capital, she noted a stark difference in educational quality, finding herself dropping from the top of her class to the bottom. Her experience pushed her to become a teacher to help equalize educational opportunities across Indonesia. While she was still in school, she also became a fan of Sri Mulyani.

After finishing high school in Jakarta, she studied economics at the University of Indonesia from 2001 to 2005, where she earned a bachelor's degree in economics. She received a distinction as the student with the highest GPA from her department in 2004. Her thesis supervisor was Chatib Basri, who later became the finance minister.

She pursued further studies internationally, obtaining her master's degree in economics from the Australian National University in 2006 and in international development economics from the Claremont Graduate University in 2010. She continued her education at Claremont, where she completed her Ph.D. in economics in 2015 while working in the World Bank.

== Academic and financial career ==
Masyita served a diverse range of roles in both academia and financial institutions. From 2007 to 2010, she was a lecturer at UI and also served as a teaching assistant during her undergraduate studies. She was also a consultant at the World Bank from 2008 to 2009. During her doctorate studies, she became a macroeconomist at the macrofiscal management division at the World Bank from 2014 to 2016. She was tasked with supporting the Indonesian government efforts of becoming an advanced nation by 2045 as well as escaping the middle income trap. Aside from her doctorate, and primary work, she also interned at the International Monetary Fund (IMF) and taught at the University of La Verne in 2013. After completing her doctoral studies, Masyita moved into public policy, serving as an economic advisor at the Coordinating Ministry for Maritime Affairs and Investment from 2016 to 2017.

Her career then shifted to the commercial sector, where she briefly worked as an economist at Mandiri Sekuritas for a few months in 2018 before being appointed as the chief economist for DBS Indonesia from 2018 to 2020. At DBS, she was responsible for covering the Indonesian and Philippine economies, providing economic analysis to various corporate, fixed income, foreign exchange, equity, and retail clients in Indonesia, Singapore, and Hong Kong.

== In the finance ministry ==
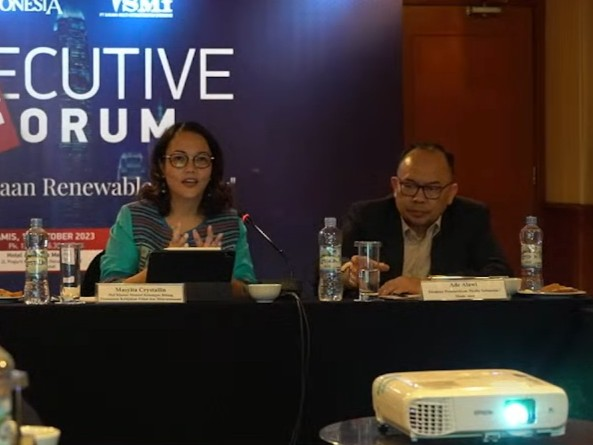
Masyita Crystallin (left) at Media Indonesia's Executive Forum in 2023.

On the last day of January 2020, Finance Minister Sri Mulyani appointed her as special advisor for fiscal and macroeconomic policy and climate change. She began this role just one month before the first official COVID-19 case was announced in Indonesia on 2 March. Following the announcement, she was instructed by Sri Mulyani to study the Spanish flu to prepare for the pandemic's potential impact and formulate out-of-the-box policies. Her duties required her to provide comprehensive economic input to the minister and other units. She was involved in the development of policies to make the state budget a "shock absorber," including the decision to widen the fiscal deficit above the 3 percent legal limit. She also became a public-facing figure, frequently communicating the ministry's policies on the National Economic Recovery program, the state budget, and investment instruments like retail state bonds through various media.

During this time, Masyita took on several other roles. She was appointed commissioner of Indonesia Financial Group (IFG) on 31 December 2020. In this role, she emphasized the importance of strengthening the insurance industry and protecting customers, noting that Indonesia's insurance assets as a percentage of GDP were lower than those of Malaysia, Thailand, and Singapore, despite a positive growth trend. Since 2021, she has also served as deputy chair of the Coalition of Finance Ministers for Climate Action, a global forum focused on integrating public finance with climate action.In 2023, she was named a member of the expert board of the Indonesian Employers' Association (Apindo) and a board member at the World Resources Institute (WRI) Indonesia. Masyita also became a partner at Systemiq Ltd., a global consulting firm specializing in environmental and energy transition issues.

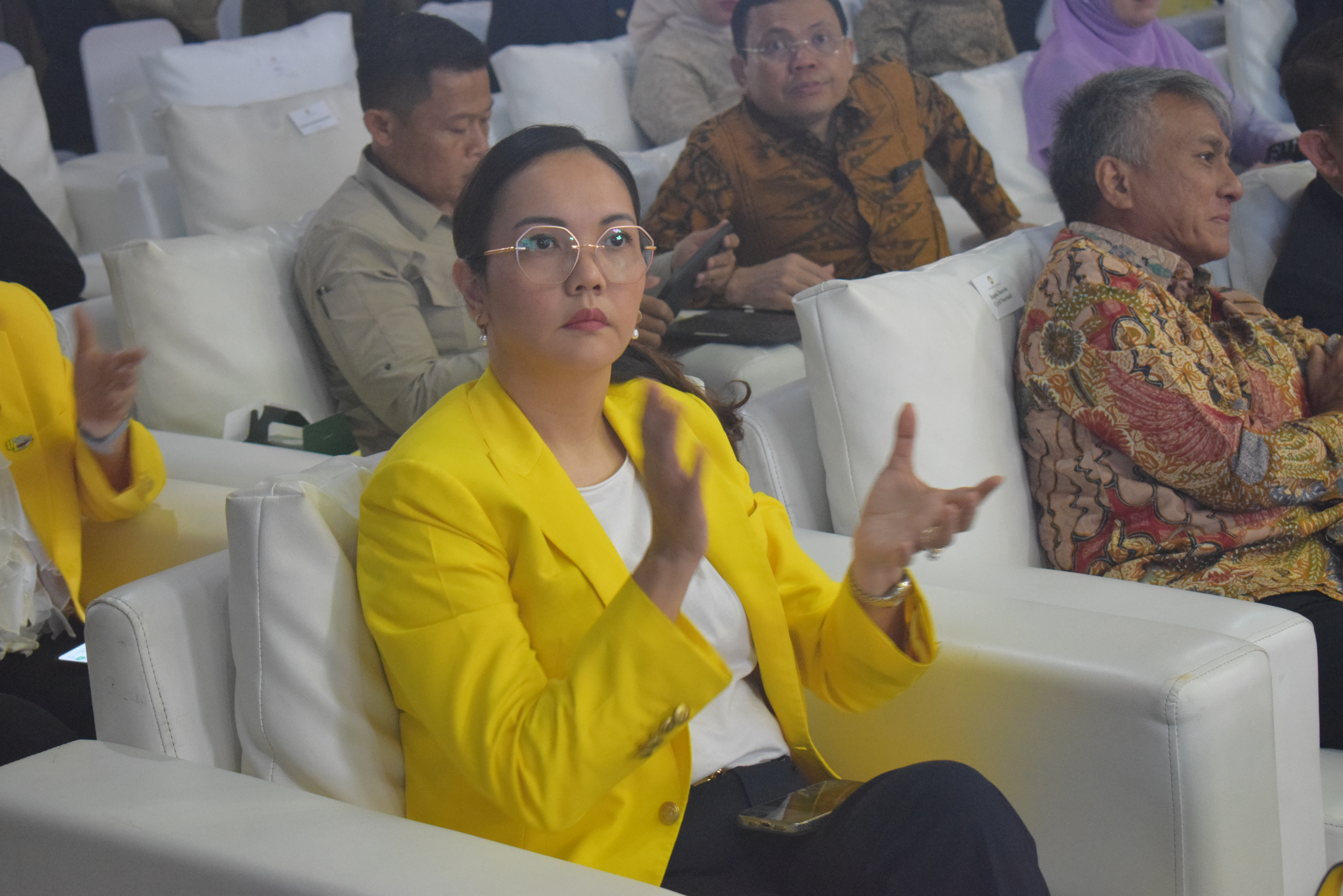
Masyita Crystallin at the University of Indonesia graduation ceremony in September 2025.

On 23 May 2025, she became the inaugural director general of financial sector stability and development at the Ministry of Finance. In that capacity, she was responsible for financial sector policies, including international cooperation and regulation of financial professions. She initiated reforms that include the demutualization of the Indonesia Stock Exchange to make it more competitive and the Financial Reporting Single Window that centralizes and streamlines financial report submissions of Indonesian companies to improve transparency.

During her tenure, she was the only woman to serve as director general within the finance ministry.

== In Danantara ==
On 11 February 2026, Masyita was appointed as the Head of Economic and ESG Strategic Positioning at Indonesia's leading sovereign wealth fund Danantara.

== Alumni association ==
Aside from her role in the government and private sector, she also serves as secretary general of the University of Indonesia alumni association, serving alongside chairperson Pramudya A. Oktavinanda.
