= Marge Calhoun =

American surfer (1926–2017)

- Born: March 20, 1926
- Died: September 2, 2017 (aged 91)
- Citizenship: United States
- Occupation: Surfer

Marge Calhoun (20 March 1926 – 2 September 2017) was an American surfer. She was the first woman world champion surfer when she won the Makaha International competition on the Hawaiian island of Oahu.

== Early life ==
Calhoun was born in Hollywood in 1924. She spent her childhood weekends with her family on Venice Beach and Santa Monica, practicing swimming and diving. Calhoun was a competitive swimmer, having trained for the 1940 Summer Olympics, before the event was cancelled due to World War II. She also worked as a stunt performer.

== Surfing ==
In the 1950 decade, Calhoun got her first surfboard from her husband, Tom. She got into the sport and started riding the waves. In 1958 she and her friend Eve Fletcher spent a month in Hawaii, where Calhoun competed in and won the Makaha Invitational tournament.

In 1961 she was a co-founder of the United States Surfing Association, being their first secretary and first woman surfing judge.

== Personal life ==
Calhoun was married to Tom Calhoun. Her daughters Candy and Robin are also surfers.
