= Saul Mandel =

American illustrator

- Born: January 21, 1926
- Died: August 14, 2011 (aged 85)
- Occupation: Illustrator
- Known for: Illustrating the Jolly Green Giant

Saul Mandel (January 21, 1926 – August 14, 2011) was an illustrator, animator and graphic designer in the advertising field. He was most known for designing the Jolly Green Giant, the 1986 Puppy Love postage stamp, and a poster for The Incredible, Edible Egg marketing campaign.

Mandel's work in advertising covered many types of products, including automobiles, airlines, milk, candy and alcohol. He worked for companies including NBC, AT&T, General Motors and Life and a variety of nonprofit groups, including the Boy Scouts of America and the Advertising Council.

== Works ==
=== The Jolly Green Giant ===
One of Mandel's famous characters, he described this as his favorite project: "I had the most fun with it. Nobody inhibited me in what I did, what I tried to do and how I did it."

=== "Puppy Love" Stamps 1986 ===
Created for United States Postal Service, the stamp had been described as 'too cute' for adult to use. Yet its popularity led to the creation of merchandise, which still be purchased at the post office.

== Awards of Excellence ==
- The Society of Illustrators
- The New York Art Directors Club
- The Chicago Art Directors Club
- The Minneapolis Art Directors Club
- The New Jersey Art Directors Club
- The Philadelphia Art Directors Club
- The Connecticut Art Directors Club
- The Institute of Outdoor Advertising.
- Humor '87, Exhibitions Award
- Creativity on Paper, National Exhibitions Award
- The Communications Magazine, Exhibitions Award
