= Donald Geary =

American ice hockey player (1926–2015)

- Born: July 10, 1926 Hamden, CT, USA
- Died: July 22, 2015 (aged 89)
- Position: Defense
- National team: United States
- Playing career: 1944–1950

Donald Edward Geary (July 10, 1926 – July 22, 2015) was an American ice hockey player who competed in ice hockey at the 1948 Winter Olympics. Geary was a member of the American ice hockey team which played eight games, but was disqualified, at the 1948 Winter Olympics hosted by St. Moritz, Switzerland.
