= T. Loren Christianson =

American politician (1926–2019)

Member of the South Dakota House of Representatives from the 6th district
- In office 1977–1994

Personal details
- Born: July 13, 1926 Astoria, South Dakota, U.S.
- Died: October 25, 2019 (aged 93) Hendricks, Minnesota, U.S.
- Party: Republican
- Spouse: Gladys L. Schmidt
- Children: five
- Profession: Farmer/Insurance Agent

Theodore Loren Christianson (July 13, 1926 – October 25, 2019) was an American politician in the state of South Dakota. He was a member of the South Dakota House of Representatives from 1977 to 1994. Christianson, a Korean War veteran, was a farmer and insurance agent. He also served on the Astoria School Board, as Deuel County Commissioner, as Chairman of the Deuel County Republican Party, as Director of Brookings-Deuel Rural Water System, Director of South Dakota Association of Rural Water Systems, and as Director of Deuel County Farm Mutual Insurance Company. He died in 2019.
