= 1926 Alabama House of Representatives election =

- November 2, 1926

All 106 seats in the Alabama House of Representatives 54 seats needed for a majority
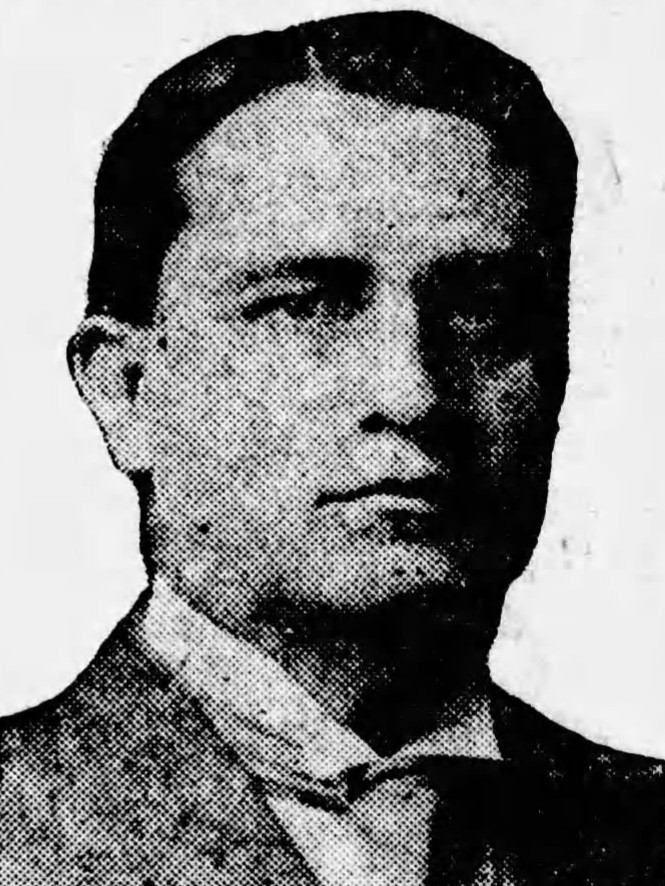

	Majority party	Minority party
Leader	Hugh D. Merrill	—
Party	Democratic	Republican
Leader since	January 9, 1923	—
Leader's seat	Calhoun Co.	—
Last election	103 seats	3 seats
Seats won	104	2
Seat change	▲1	▼1
Popular vote	181,571	20,634
Percentage	89.77%	10.20%
- Results: Democratic gain Democratic hold Republican hold
Speaker before election
Hugh Davis Merrill
Democratic
Elected Speaker
J. Lee Long
Democratic

The 1926 Alabama House of Representatives election took place on Tuesday, November 2, 1926, and elected 106 representatives to serve four-year terms in the Alabama House of Representatives. 104 Democrats and 2 Republicans were elected to the 1927 House.

On December 28, 1926, J. Lee Long of Butler County was elected Speaker of the House on the tenth ballot.

== General election results ==
Counties not listed were won by Democrats in both the 1922 and 1926 elections:

- Chilton: Republican Percy M. Pitts was elected. Republican W. M. Wyatt won this seat in 1922. Republican hold.
- DeKalb: Democrat John T. Bartlett was elected. Republican John P. Hawkins won this seat in 1922. Democratic gain.
- Winston: Republican R. M. Rivers was elected. Republican J. A. Posey won this seat in 1922. Republican hold.

== See also ==
- Category:1926 elections in Alabama
  - 1926 United States House of Representatives elections in Alabama
  - 1926 Alabama gubernatorial election
- 1926 United States elections
