= 1922 Alabama House of Representatives election =

- November 7, 1922

All 106 seats in the Alabama House of Representatives 54 seats needed for a majority
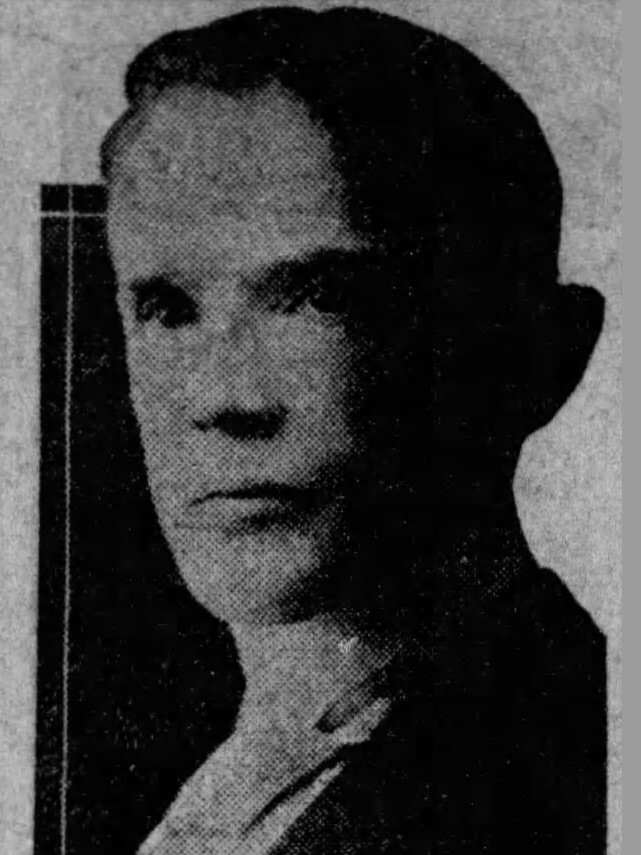

	Majority party	Minority party
Leader	Seybourne Lynne	—
Party	Democratic	Republican
Leader since	September 14, 1920	—
Leader's seat	Morgan Co.	—
Last election	102 seats	4 seats
Seats won	103	3
Seat change	▲1	▼1
- Results: Democratic gain Democratic hold Republican gain Republican hold
Speaker before election
Seybourne Lynne
Democratic
Elected Speaker
Hugh Davis Merrill
Democratic

The 1922 Alabama House of Representatives election took place on Tuesday, November 7, 1922, to elect 106 representatives to serve four-year terms in the Alabama House of Representatives. 103 Democrats and 3 Republicans were elected to the 1923 House.

On January 9, 1923, Hugh Davis Merrill of Calhoun County defeated J. Lee Long for the Speaker nomination, 59 to 41.

== General election results ==
Counties not listed were won by Democrats in both the 1918 and 1922 elections:

- Chilton: Republican W. M. Wyatt was elected. Republican W. A. Reynolds won this seat in 1918.
- DeKalb: Republican John P. Hawkins was elected. Democrat E. M. Baker won this seat in 1918.
- Cullman: Democrat Finis E. St. John was elected. Republican T. H. Roberson won this seat in 1918.
- Shelby: Democrat Paul O. Luck was elected. Republican A. P. Longshore won this seat in 1918.
- Winston: Republican J. A. Posey was elected. Republican J. M. Burns won this seat in 1918.

== See also ==
- Category:1922 elections in Alabama
  - 1922 United States House of Representatives elections in Alabama
  - 1922 Alabama gubernatorial election
- 1922 United States elections
