= B. B. McCraw =

American politician in Alabama

B. B. McCraw was an American state legislator in Alabama. He served in the Alabama House of Representatives including as Speaker of the Alabama House of Representatives. He represented Chambers County, Alabama. He was Speaker of the Alabama House in 1868 during a special session. He was a Republican.

In 1854, he and A. N. Worthy were among the incorporators of the Troy Fire Department. In 1864 he was a judge.

George F. Harrington succeeded him as Speaker.
