= Samuel Oliver =

Samuel Oliver may refer to:

- S. Addison Oliver (1833–1912), American pioneer, lawyer, judge and politician
- Samuel Pasfield Oliver (1838–1907), English artillery officer, geographer and antiquary
- Samuel W. Oliver (fl. 1829–1837), Alabama politician and Speaker of the Alabama House of Representatives; see 1837 Alabama gubernatorial election
