= 7th Arkansas Infantry Battalion =

7th Arkansas Infantry Battalion (Confederate)
- Active: 1861–1862
- Country: Confederate States of America
- Allegiance: CSA
- Branch: Infantry
- Engagements: American Civil War

The 7th Arkansas Infantry Battalion (1861–1862) was a Confederate Army infantry battalion during the American Civil War. The battalion, which was often referred to as Desha's Battalion, was eventually consolidated with the 9th Arkansas Infantry Battalion and the 8th Arkansas Infantry Regiment.

== Organization ==
The 7th Arkansas Battalion was organized Major Franklin Desha of Independence County. Desha was a Mexican–American War veteran and had commanded a company in the Arkansas Regiment of Mounted Gunmen during the Battle of Buena Vista. The unit was eventually made up of six understrength companies. Desha was forced to compete with other Arkansas regiments organizing in northeast Arkansas in July 1861 and many Independence County men chose the 8th Arkansas Infantry Regiment over Desha's because Desha refused to allow the men to elect their sergeants and corporals. The unit was composed of volunteer companies from the following counties:

- Company A, The "Searcy Greys" from White County, commanded by Captain Jesse Newton Cypert.
- Company B, from Independence County, commanded by Captain Simeon Cason.
- Company C, from Independence County, commanded by Captain Samuel C. Jones.
- Company D, from Independence County, commanded by Captain John W. Cullins.
- Company E, from White County, commanded by Captain John Critz.
- Company F, from Arkansas County, commanded by Captain D. S. Morris.

Captain Cypert of Company A was appointed major when the battalion was organized, and was succeeded as captain by George Franklin Baucum. In August, the Confederate War Department designated Desha's Battalion as the 7th Battalion Arkansas Volunteers.

== Operations ==
=== Winter in Arkansas ===
In September 1861 when Brigadier General William Hardee moved most of his Arkansas troops east of the Mississippi River, to Columbus, Kentucky, to become the Army of Central Kentucky, he left Desha's battalion behind in Arkansas. Colonel Solon Borland was left in command of a small force at Pitman’s Ferry, Arkansas. Colonel Borland's force was the only defense left in Northeast Arkansas. The forces included: Borland's own cavalry regiment of seven companies, Colonel McCraver’s five companies of infantry, Capt. Robert's artillery unit of 60 men but no guns, and about 150 recruits brought by a Major McCray and Major Desha's four companies, which were described as "raw troops". Colonel Borland's command numbered about 1286 men, but of these, Colonel Borland said he could count on no more than 600 for fighting service, and all were "raw, inexperienced, poorly disciplined and indifferently armed."

Desha's command responded to several false alarms of impending Union invasion during the fall and winter of 1861−62. By January 1862, Colonel Borland had been replaced in command of this quasi brigade of units known as the "White River Forces" by Colonel James H. McCarver of the 14th Arkansas.

=== Movement east ===
In January 1862, Colonel McCarver received orders to move his command across the Mississippi River to Memphis Tennessee. McCarver set his command in motion but only made it as far as Jacksonport before being ordered back to Pocahontas, Arkansas. Maj Desha's unit apparently left Arkansas before the order was changed, because Desha's battalion arrived at Memphis Tennessee on February 2, 1862, with a total fit for of 384. The unit was immediately ordered to Bear Creek bridge.

In February 1862 orders were issued confirming Frank Desha's appointment as major, with date of rank October 25, 1861, and then promoting Desha to lieutenant colonel with date of rank from January 31, 1862. Desha's battalion was assigned to Colonel Alfred Mouton's 4th Brigade, of Brigadier General Daniel Ruggels' 1st Corps, 1st Division, 2nd Grand Division, Army of the Mississippi Valley.

In preparation for the Battle of Shiloh, General Albert Sydney Johnston ordered General Braxton Bragg to detach the 51st and 52nd Tennessee, Blount's Alabama, and Desha's Arkansas Battalions from his Corps to form garrison for post and depot at Corinth.

=== Consolidation with the 8th Arkansas Infantry Regiment ===
As early as April 2, 1861, the consolidation of the 7th (Desha's) Battalion from six to three companies and consolidation with another Arkansas regiment was being considered. Lieutenant Colonel Desha addressed a letter to his commanding officer recommending which companies to be consolidated together and which officers should be retained on that date. An order dated April 28 from General Braxton Bragg to Lieutenant Colonel Desha adopted Desha's recommendations and ordered the consolidation of Desha's Battalion with Fagan's 1st Arkansas Infantry Regiment. However Desha objected to the consolidation with Fagan's 1st Arkansas and instead asked for a consolidation with the 8th Arkansas due to the fact that the units had been recruited in the same area. An order was signed by Brigadier General William Hardee ordering the Desha's 7th Arkansas Battalion to consolidate with Colonel Kelly's 8th Arkansas Infantry Regiment. Some sources indicate the men of the 7th Battalion were very upset with the consolidation and at least one company threatened to mutiny.

In May 1862 the Confederate Army underwent an army-wide reorganization due to the passage of the Conscription Act by the Confederate Congress in April 1862. All twelve-month regiments had to re-muster and enlist for two years or the duration of the war; a new election of officers was ordered; and men who were exempted from service by age or other reasons under the Conscription Act were allowed to take a discharge and go home. Officers who did not choose to stand for re-election were also offered a discharge. The reorganization was accomplished among all the Arkansas regiments in and around Corinth, Mississippi, following the Battle of Shiloh.

On May 7, 1862, the original members of the 8th Arkansas Infantry Regiment were consolidated into five companies and united with the 7th and 9th Arkansas Infantry Battalions. The reorganized regiment was composed of the following companies:

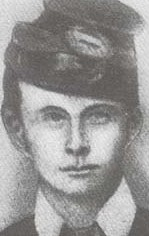
Colonel John H. Kelly, became the youngest General Officer in the Confederate Army.

- Company A — Originally Companies B & K of the 8th Arkansas Infantry Regiment from Jackson county.
- Company B — Originally Companies D & I of the 8th Arkansas Infantry Regiment from Jackson county.
- Company C — Originally Companies E & H of the 8th Arkansas Infantry Regiment from Independence county.
- Company D — Originally Companies C & F of the 8th Arkansas Infantry Regiment, from Independence and White counties.
- Company E — Originally Companies A & G of the 8th Arkansas Infantry Regiment from Independence county.
- Company F — Originally Companies B & C of the 9th Arkansas Infantry Battalion, which were also (originally Companies B & E, of the (McCarver's) 14th Arkansas Infantry Regiment).
- Company G — Originally Companies A & D. of the 9th Arkansas Infantry Battalion, Izard and Jackson county (originally Companies A & H, of the (McCarver's) 14th Arkansas Infantry Regiment)
- Company H — Originally Companies B & C, of the 7th Arkansas Infantry Battalion, from Independence county.
- Company I — Originally Companies D & F, of the 7th Arkansas Infantry Battalion, from Jackson county.
- Company K — Originally Companies A & E, of the 7th Arkansas Infantry Battalion, from White county.

Upon reorganization, John H. Kelly was elected colonel; Wilson, lieutenant colonel, and Capt. G. F. Baucum, major. Lieutenant-Colonel Wilson resigned, and Anderson Watkins was elected major. Upon the promotion of Colonel Kelly to brigadier-general, Baucum became colonel, and Anderson Watkins, lieutenant colonel.

== Final consolidation and surrender ==
The 8th Arkansas Infantry Regiment served in the Army of the Tennessee throughout the war, seeing action in the Kentucky, Tennessee and Georgia campaigns. The 8th Arkansas was assigned to Major General Patrick Cleburne's division. As of result of heavy casualties the regiment was eventually consolidated with the 19th Arkansas before finally being merged into the 1st Arkansas Consolidated Infantry Regiment, just before the surrender in April 1865.

== See also ==
- List of Confederate units from Arkansas
- Confederate Units by State
