= 1918 Alabama House of Representatives election =

- November 5, 1918

All 106 seats in the Alabama House of Representatives 54 seats needed for a majority
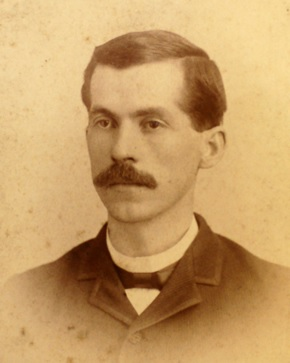

	Majority party	Minority party	Third party
Leader	Archibald H. Carmichael	Chester Tubb (lost re-election)	W. E. Thomas (did not stand)
Party	Democratic	Republican	Progressive
Leader since	January 12, 1915	November 3, 1914	November 3, 1914
Leader's seat	Colbert Co.	—	—
Last election	104 seats	1 seat	1 seat
Seats won	102	4	0
Seat change	▼2	▲3	▼1
- Results: Democratic hold Republican gain Republican hold
Speaker before election
Archibald H. Carmichael
Democratic
Elected Speaker
Henry P. Merritt
Democratic

The 1918 Alabama House of Representatives election took place on Tuesday, November 5, 1918, to elect 106 representatives to serve four-year terms in the Alabama House of Representatives. 102 Democrats and 4 Republicans were elected to the 1919 House.

On January 14, 1919, Henry P. Merritt of Macon County was unanimously elected speaker. After the adjournment of the 1919 Legislature, Merritt was appointed to the Alabama Court of Appeals on October 23, 1919. On September 14, 1920, Seybourn A. Lynne of Morgan County was unanimously elected to take his place.

== General election results ==
Counties not listed were won by Democrats in both the 1914 and 1918 elections:

- Chilton: Republican William A. Reynolds was elected. "Bull Moose" Progressive W. E. Thomas won this seat in 1914.
- Cullman: Republican T. H. Robertson was elected. Democrat R. E. Ryan won this seat in 1914.
- Shelby: Republican A. P. Longshore was elected. Democrat H. M. Judge won this seat in 1914.
- Winston: Republican Jeremiah Burns defeated incumbent Republican representative Chester Tubb in the primary.

== See also ==
- Category:1918 elections in Alabama
  - 1918 United States House of Representatives elections in Alabama
  - 1918 Alabama gubernatorial election
- 1918 United States elections
