= 9th Arkansas Infantry Battalion =

9th Arkansas Infantry Battalion (Confederate)
- Active: 1861–1862
- Country: Confederate States of America
- Allegiance: CSA
- Branch: Infantry
- Engagements: American Civil War: Battle of Shiloh

The 9th Arkansas Infantry Battalion (1861–1862) was a Confederate Army infantry battalion during the American Civil War. The battalion was formed from four companies of McCarver's 14th Arkansas Infantry Regiment. After the Battle of Shiloh, the battalion was consolidated with the 8th Arkansas Infantry Regiment.

== Organization ==
McCarver's 14th Arkansas Regiment was organized on October 22, 1861, at Pocahontas, Arkansas, with nine companies (a tenth company was added in December) from Izard, Lawrence, and Randolph counties. The unit was composed of volunteer companies from the following counties:

- Company A, The "Izard Volunteers", Commanded by Captain Lindsey S. Williams, organized at Pocahontas, Arkansas on September 1, 1861.
- Company B, Commanded by Captain Thomas N. Smith, organized at Pocahontas, Arkansas on September 24, 1861.
- Company C, Commanded by Captain Enoch O. Wolf.
- Company D, Commanded by Captain Christopher C. Elkins, organized in Izard Co, Arkansas on August 27, 1861.
- Company E, Commanded by Captain Hugh A. Barnett, organized at Pocahontas, Arkansas on September 23, 1861.
- Company F, Commanded by Captain William G. Matheney, organized at Pocahontas, Arkansas on September 23, 1861.
- Company G, Commanded by Captain Samuel J. Herndon, organized at Pocahontas, Arkansas on August 31, 1861.
- Company H, Commanded by Captain, organized at Pocahontas, Arkansas on September 23, 1861.
- Company I, Commanded by Captain Adison H. Nunn, organized at Pocahontas, Arkansas on October 24, 1861.
- Company K, Commanded by Captain Thomas G. Shinpock, organized at Pitman's Ferry, Arkansas on December 18, 1861. This unit had originally served as Company D, 2nd Arkansas 30 Day Volunteer Regiment. The company was organized at Augusta, Jackson (now Woodruff) County, Arkansas; enlisted for thirty days at Camp Borland, near Pocahontas, Arkansas, on November 24, 1861; and was discharged on December 18, 1861. Endorsement on muster roll—“Muster Roll of Capt. Shinpock’s Co. of Vol. Inf., raised in response to Col. Borland’s call of Nov. 5; mustered into the Confederate service Nov. 24 for 30 days; and discharged Dec. 18, 1861; entitled to pay from date of muster to the time set opposite their respective names, and to transportation and subsistence from Pocahontas to Augusta, Arks, — miles. Camp Borland, Ark., Decr 18, 1861.”

In January 1862 Brigadier General William J. Hardee made a decision to detach four of the regiment's best armed and equipped companies (Companies A, B, E & H) and designate them as the 9th Battalion Arkansas Infantry, and place them under the command of Major John H. Kelly. The companies which became the 9th Arkansas Infantry Battalion were armed with weapons which the state confiscated when the Federal Arsenal at Little Rock was seized by Arkansas State Militia troops in February 1861. Disposition of the weapons found in the Arsenal is somewhat sketchy, but from various records it can be surmised that the 9th and 10th Arkansas, Kelly's 9th Arkansas Battalion, and the 3rd Arkansas Cavalry were issued flintlock Hall's Rifles from the Arsenal.

== Battles ==
General Hardee took the 9th Arkansas Battalion with him when he transferred his command to Kentucky and organized the Confederate Army of Central Kentucky. After the losses of Fort Henry and Fort Donelson in February 1862, Confederate General Albert Sidney Johnston withdrew his forces into western Tennessee, northern Mississippi, and Alabama to reorganize. and then retreated through western Tennessee to northern Mississippi. On March 29, 1862, the Army of Central Kentucky was merged into the Army of Mississippi in preparation for the Battle of Shiloh.<refBoatner, Mark M. III (1988). The Civil War Dictionary (Revised ed.). New York: David McKay. p. 445. ISBN 978-0-8129-1726-0.</ref> The 9th Arkansas Infantry Battalion, under the command of Major Kelly was assigned to Brigadier General S.A.M. Wood's brigade of Hardee's Corps, of the Army of Mississippi and participated in the Battle of Shiloh, Tennessee on April 6, 1862

== Consolidation with the 8th Arkansas ==
In May 1862 the Confederate Army underwent an army-wide reorganization due to the passage of the Conscription Act by the Confederate Congress in April 1862. All twelve-month regiments had to re-muster and enlist for two years or the duration of the war; a new election of officers was ordered; and men who were exempted from service by age or other reasons under the Conscription Act were allowed to take a discharge and go home. Officers who did not choose to stand for re-election were also offered a discharge. The reorganization was accomplished among all the Arkansas regiments in and around Corinth, Mississippi, following the Battle of Shiloh.

On May 7, 1862, the original members of the 8th Arkansas Infantry Regiment were consolidated into five companies and united with the 7th and 9th Arkansas Infantry Battalions.

The reorganized regiment was composed of the following companies:

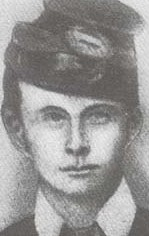
Colonel John H. Kelly, became the youngest General Officer in the Confederate Army.

- Company A — Originally Companies B & K of the 8th Arkansas Infantry Regiment from Jackson county.
- Company B — Originally Companies D & I of the 8th Arkansas Infantry Regiment from Jackson county.
- Company C — Originally Companies E & H of the 8th Arkansas Infantry Regiment from Independence county.
- Company D — Originally Companies C & F of the 8th Arkansas Infantry Regiment, from Independence and White counties.
- Company E — Originally Companies A & G of the 8th Arkansas Infantry Regiment from Independence county.
- Company F — Originally Companies B & C of the 9th Arkansas Infantry Battalion, which were also (originally Companies B & E, of the (McCarver's) 14th Arkansas Infantry Regiment).
- Company G — Originally Companies A & D. of the 9th Arkansas Infantry Battalion, Izard and Jackson county (originally Companies A & H, of the (McCarver's) 14th Arkansas Infantry Regiment)
- Company H — Originally Companies B & C, of the 7th Arkansas Infantry Battalion, from Independence county.
- Company I — Originally Companies D & F, of the 7th Arkansas Infantry Battalion, from Jackson county.
- Company K — Originally Companies A & E, of the 7th Arkansas Infantry Battalion.

Upon reorganization, John H. Kelly was elected colonel; Wilson, lieutenant colonel, and Capt. G. F. Baucum, major. Lieutenant-Colonel Wilson resigned, and Anderson Watkins was elected major. Upon the promotion of Colonel Kelly to brigadier-general, Baucum became colonel, and Anderson Watkins, lieutenant colonel. The unit participated in the following engagements as a separate command:

Battle of Shiloh, Tennessee, April 6–7, 1862.
Siege of Corinth, April to June 1862.

== Final consolidation and Surrender ==
The 8th Arkansas Infantry Regiment served in the Army of the Tennessee throughout the war, seeing action in the Kentucky, Tennessee and Georgia campaigns. The 8th Arkansas was assigned to Major General Patrick Cleburne's division. As of result of heavy casualties the regiment was eventually consolidated with the 19th Arkansas before finally being merged into the 1st Arkansas Consolidated Infantry Regiment, just before the surrender in April 1865.

== See also ==
- List of Confederate units from Arkansas
- Confederate Units by State
