= 1930 Alabama House of Representatives election =

- November 4, 1930

All 106 seats in the Alabama House of Representatives 54 seats needed for a majority
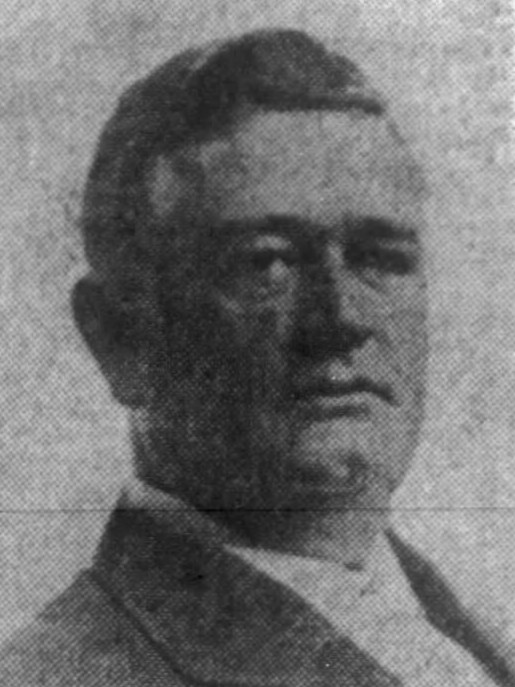

	Majority party	Minority party
Leader	J. Lee Long	—
Party	Democratic	Republican
Leader since	January 9, 1923	—
Leader's seat	Calhoun Co.	—
Last election	103 seats	2 seats
Seats won	100	3
Seat change	▼3	▲1
	Third party
Party	Jeffersonian "Independent Body"
Last election	New
Seats won	3
Seat change	▲3
- Results: Democratic hold Republican gain Republican hold Independent Body gain Multi-member districts: Democratic majority Independent Body majority
Speaker before election
J. Lee Long
Democratic
Elected Speaker
Alfred M. Tunstall
Democratic

The 1930 Alabama House of Representatives election took place on Tuesday, November 4, 1930, to elect 106 representatives to serve four-year terms in the Alabama House of Representatives. 100 Democrats, 3 Republicans, and 3 "pollywogs" or "Jeffersonians," independent Democrats who were associated with J. Thomas Heflin's U.S. Senate re-election bid, were elected to the 1931 House.

Representative Alfred M. Tunstall of Hale County was unanimously elected for a second stint as Speaker of the House on January 13, 1931.

== General election results ==
Counties not listed were won by Democrats in both the 1922 and 1926 elections:

- Chambers (2-seat): Jeffersonians Y. L. Burton and J. W. Hollingsworth were elected. Democrats R. C. Wallace and J. O. Webb won these seats in 1926. Independent Body gain.
- Chilton: Republican Percy M. Pitts was re-elected, first elected in 1926. Republican hold.
- Clay: Jeffersonian J. W. Jordan was elected. Democrat J. J. Cockrell won this seat in 1926. Independent Body gain.
- DeKalb: J. W. Loyd was elected. Democrat John T. Bartlett won this seat in 1926. Republican gain.
- Winston: J. A. Posey was elected. Republican R. M. Rivers won this seat in 1926. Republican hold.

== See also ==
- Category:1930 elections in Alabama
  - 1930 United States Senate election in Alabama
  - 1930 United States House of Representatives elections in Alabama
  - 1930 Alabama gubernatorial election
- 1930 United States elections
