= Thomas B. Cooper =

Thomas B. Cooper is the name of:

- Thomas Buchecker Cooper (1823–1862), Democratic member of the U.S. House of Representatives from Pennsylvania
- Thomas Butler Cooper (fl. from 1842), Alabama teacher, merchant, lawyer, and politician, and Speaker of the Alabama House of Representatives
