= Lewis M. Stone =

Alabama politician

Lewis M. Stone (died 1890) was a lawyer and politician in Alabama. He served in the Alabama House of Representatives including as Speaker of the Alabama House of Representatives and in the Alabama Senate. He was also a delegate at two of the state's constitutional conventions. He lived in Carrollton, Alabama. His former home a 201 Phoenix is listed on the National Register of Historic Places. A historical marker commemorates the history of his home which was also home to John Herbert Kelly.

He graduated from the University of Alabama in 1834. Afterwards he studied at Harvard, graduating in 1841. He married Eliza Kelly.

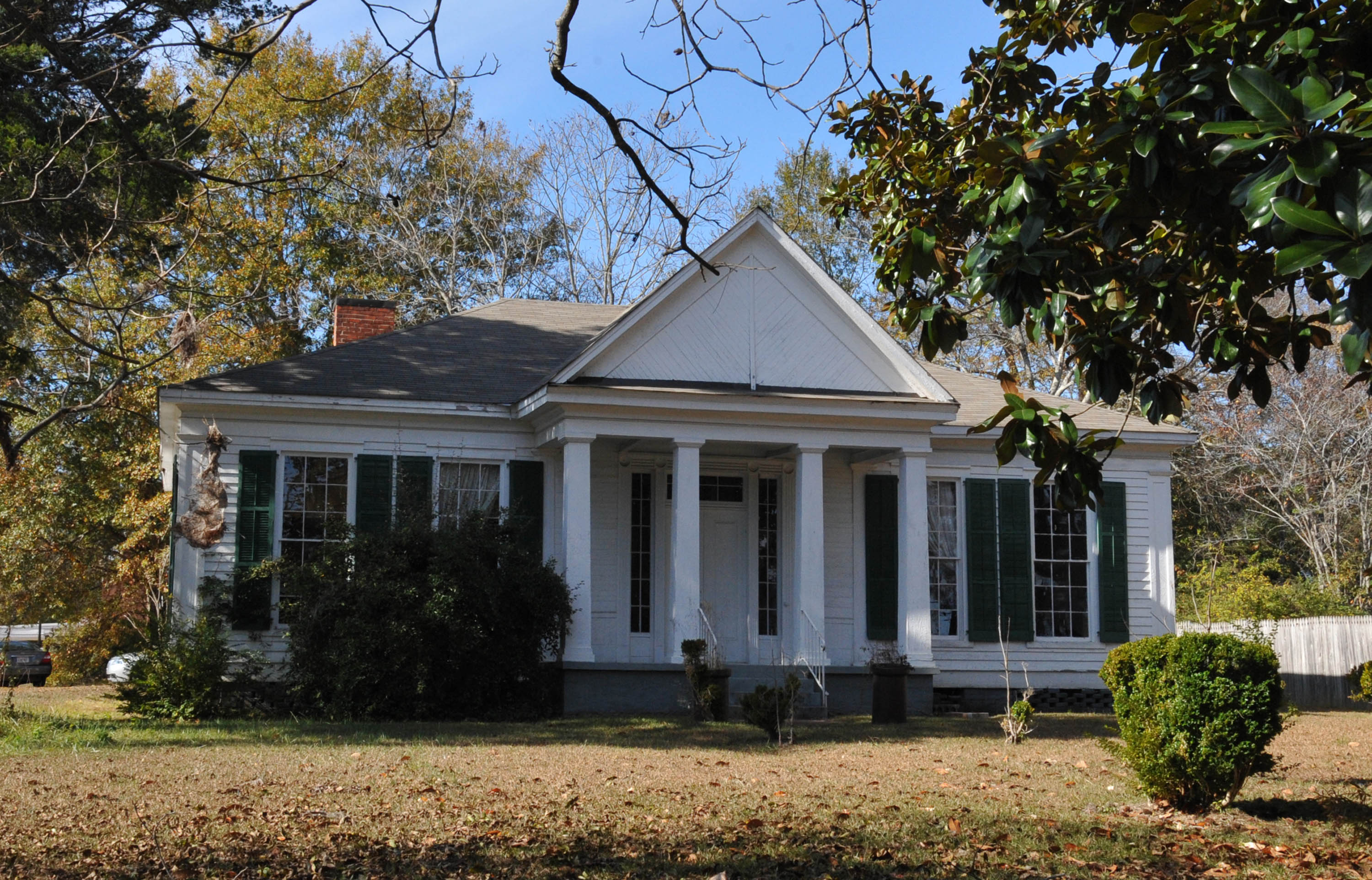
His home in Carrollton

January 9, 1861, he delivered a speech on secession. In 1864 he wrote a letter to governor Thomas Hill Watts.
