= Henry P. Merritt =

American politician (1873–1923)

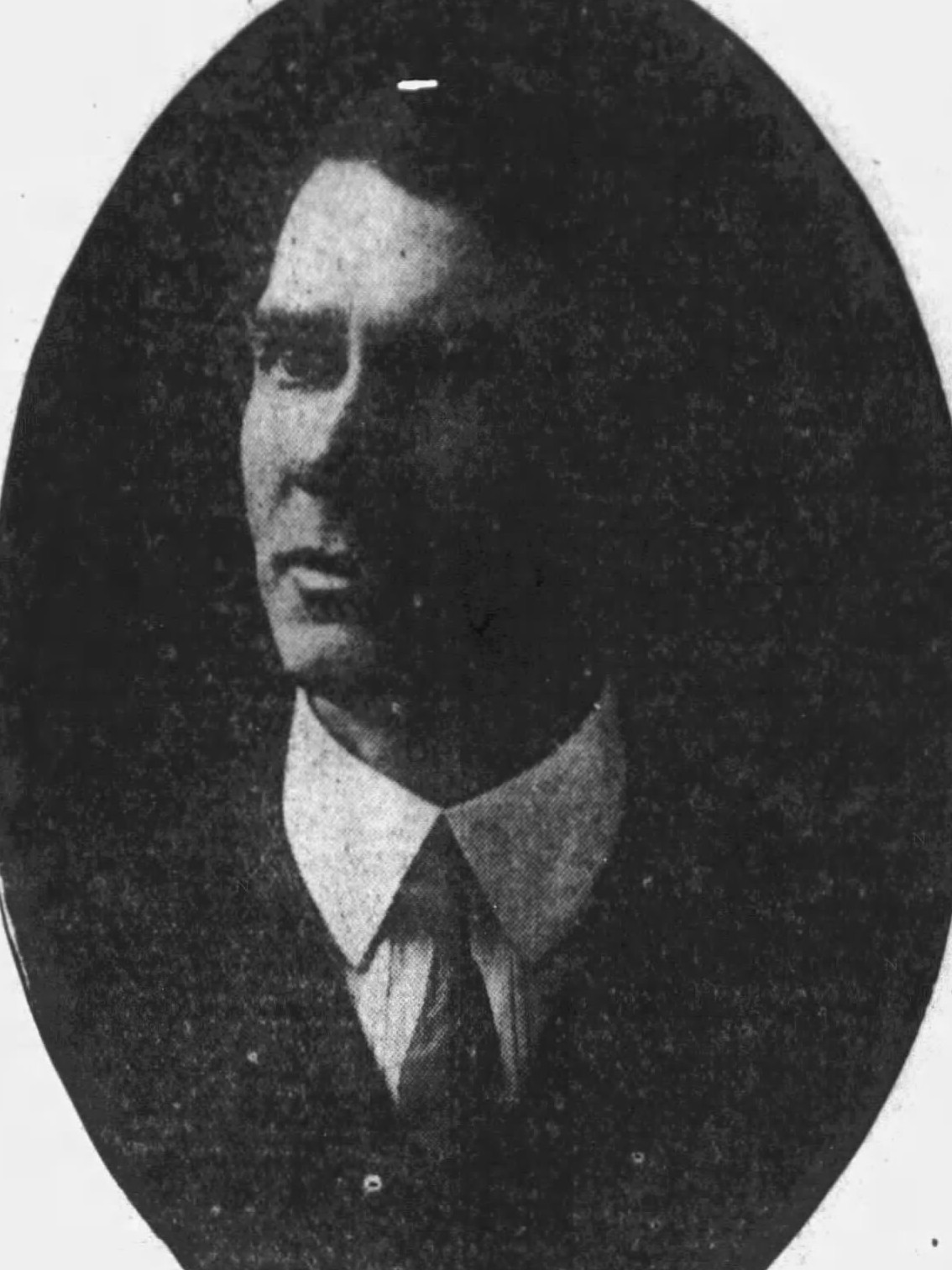

Henry Paul Merritt (June 7, 1873 – March 26, 1923) was a politician and judge in Alabama. In 1906 he was elected state senator of Alabama. In 1910 he was elected to the first of three terms as state represented, and in 1919 he was elected to serve as Speaker of the Alabama House of Representatives. A Democrat, he was a member of the mason organization and Knights of Pythias. He served on the Alabama Court of Appeals starting in 1919.

Merritt died on March 26, 1923, in Birmingham, Alabama, at the age of 49.

== See also ==
- 1918 Alabama House of Representatives election
