= Hugh Wilson Hill House =

Historic house in Alabama, United States

- U.S. National Register of Historic Places
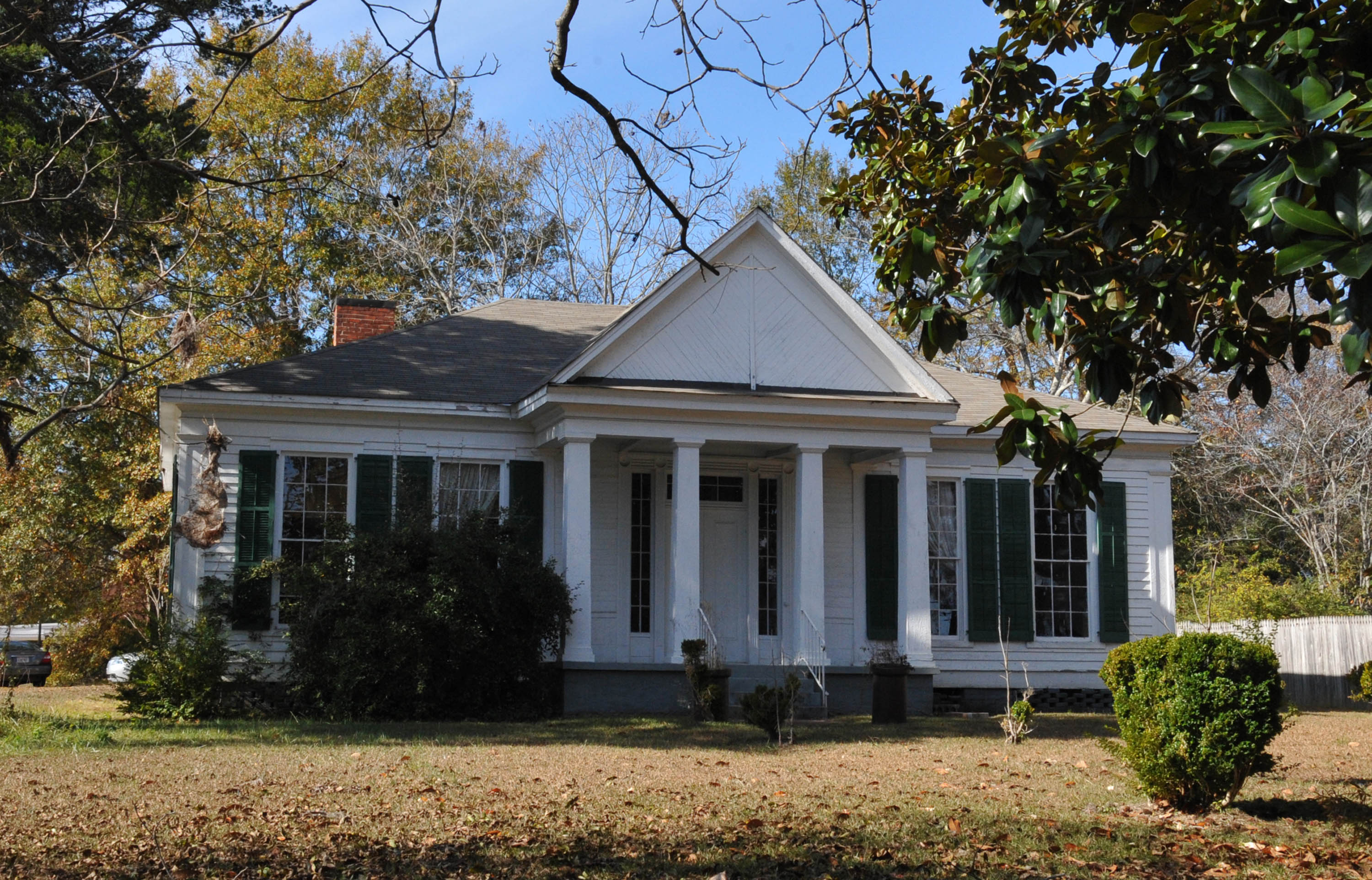
- The house in May 2008

- Location within Alabama Location within the United States
- Location: 201 Phoenix, Carrollton, Alabama
- Coordinates: 33°15′46″N 88°5′45″W
- Area: 0.5 acres (0.20 ha)
- Architectural style: Greek Revival
- NRHP reference No.: 89000292
- Added to NRHP: April 13, 1989

The Hugh Wilson Hill House, also known as the Kelly-Stone-Hill House, is a historic house in Carrollton, Alabama. It is one of only a few surviving antebellum structures remaining in the town. Architectural historians believe that the one-story Greek Revival-style house was built for Isham and Elizabeth Kelly during the late 1830s or 1840s. Confederate general John Herbert Kelly grew up in the house. It was added to the National Register of Historic Places on April 13, 1989. It was listed as one of Alabama's "Places in Peril" for 2010 by the Alabama Historical Commission and Alabama Trust for Historic Preservation.
