= Crawford M. Jackson =

Alabama politician (1820–1860)

Crawford Motley Jackson (1820 – February 26, 1860) was a state legislator in Alabama who served in the Alabama House of Representatives before the American Civil War including a term as Speaker of the Alabama House of Representatives He was a Democrat.

Jackson was born Autauga County to James Crawford Jackson, a delegate to Alabama's constitutional convention of 1819. Temperance née Motley Jackson was his mother. He attended the University of Alabama and studied law. He served in the Creek War of 1836. He inherited his father's plantation. He served in the Alabama House from 1843 to 1849 and from 1853 to 1859. He was a delegate to the Alabama convention of 1860.

He enslaved 136 people. He died at his residence in Coosada.

The Smithsonian has an oil painting of him.

His brother Absalom Jackson was a lawyer and plantation owner who built The Elms where he lived with his wife Emma Hall Jackson. They had a son Crawford Motley Jackson II, (July 19, 1840 – August 11, 1897).
