= Harrison House (Franklin, Tennessee) =

Historic house in Tennessee, United States

- U.S. National Register of Historic Places
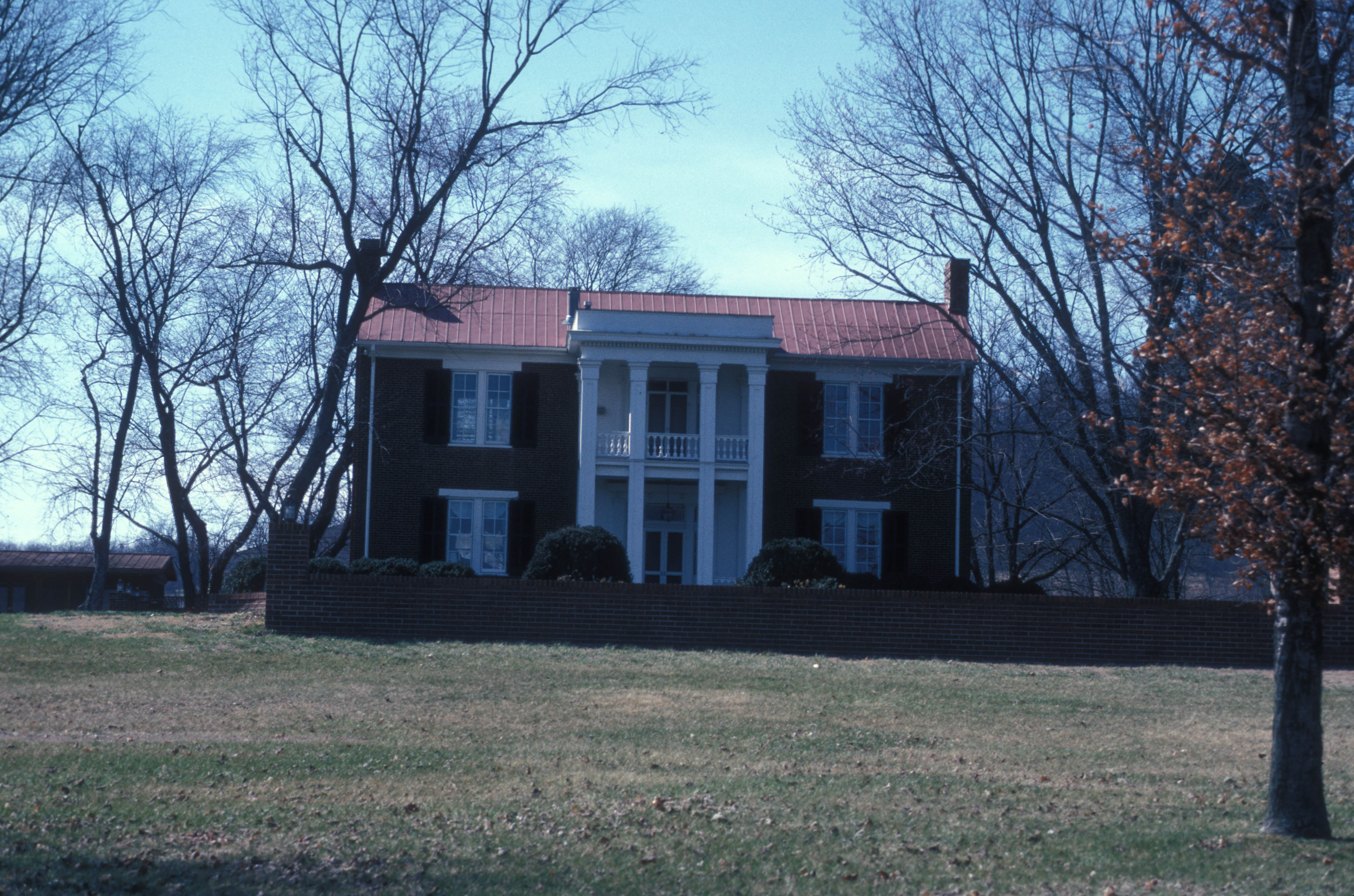

- Location within Tennessee Location within the United States
- Location: S of Franklin on Columbia Pike, Franklin, Tennessee
- Coordinates: 35°52′56″N 86°52′51″W
- Area: 9 acres (3.6 ha)
- Built: 1810 and 1848
- Built by: William Harrison
- NRHP reference No.: 75001799
- Added to NRHP: June 18, 1975

The Harrison House is historic slave plantation home property in Franklin, Tennessee that was listed on the United States National Register of Historic Places (NRHP) in 1975. It was built perhaps in 1810 and was extended and remodelled in 1848 by William Harrison. The remodelling added a "two-story entrance portico and second-story gallery porch typical of many antebellum homes."

It was the site of the last staff meeting of Confederate General John Bell Hood with his staff before the 1864 Battle of Franklin, on battlefield 3 miles (4.8 km) north.

Confederate Brig. Gen. John H. Kelly died and was buried here, after a smaller, earlier battle.

After the Battle of Franklin, Confederate Brig. Gen. John C. Carter was brought here and died on Dec. 10, 1864.

The NRHP listing includes an area of 9 acres (3.6 ha).
