= Carrollton, Alabama =

City in and county seat of Pickens County, Alabama

- Town
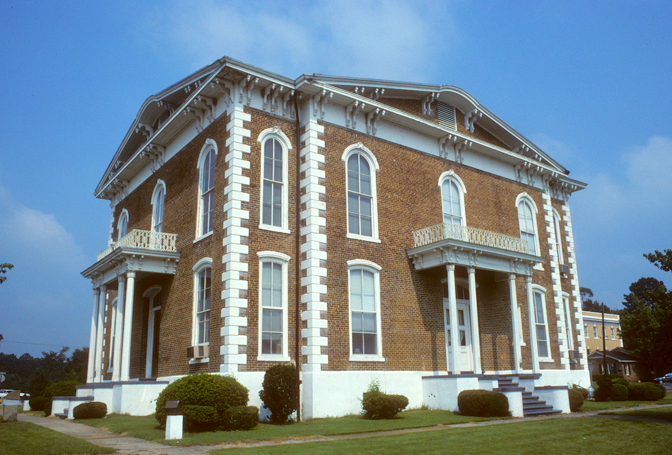
- Pickens County Courthouse in Carrollton

- Location of Carrollton in Pickens County, Alabama.
- Coordinates: 33°15′20″N 88°05′41″W
- Country: United States
- State: Alabama
- County: Pickens

Area
  - Total: 2.08 sq mi (5.39 km^{2})
  - Land: 2.06 sq mi (5.33 km^{2})
  - Water: 0.023 sq mi (0.06 km^{2})
- Elevation: 249 ft (76 m)

Population (2020)
  - Total: 1,023
  - Density: 497.0/sq mi (191.88/km^{2})
- Time zone: UTC-6 (Central (CST))
  - Summer (DST): UTC-5 (CDT)
- ZIP code: 35447
- Area codes: 205, 659
- FIPS code: 01-12304
- GNIS feature ID: 2405384

Carrollton is a city in and the county seat of Pickens County, Alabama, United States. As of the 2020 census, Carrollton had a population of 1,023. The Hugh Wilson Hill House / Kelly - Stone - Hill Place is a historic residence listed on the National Register of Historic Places.

The Pickens County Courthouse in the center of Carrollton was erected in 1877. The first courthouse in Carrollton was burned on April 5, 1865, by troops of Union General John T. Croxton. A second courthouse was destroyed by a fire on November 16, 1876.

== History ==
Incorporated in 1831, the town was named after Charles Carroll of Carrollton, Maryland, the only Roman Catholic and longest-living signer of the Declaration of Independence. A post office has been in operation at Carrollton since 1831.

The county jail was located at the courthouse. The courthouse square was used frequently as a site for public lynchings by whites of African Americans, part of numerous efforts to suppress them during a time of high tensions as whites struggled for dominance. It was part of a program of intimidation and racial terrorism, with these murders frequent in the decades on either side of the turn of the 20th century. Among the numerous African Americans lynched in Carrollton was John Gibson, hanged on August 28, 1907. Pickens County had the fifth highest total of lynchings in Alabama, according to Lynching in America (2015, 3rd edition), published by the Equal Justice Initiative.

== Geography ==
According to the U.S. Census Bureau, the town has a total area of 2.1 square miles (5.4 km^{2}), of which 2.1 square miles (5.4 km^{2}) is land and 0.04 square miles (0.10 km^{2}) (0.96%) is water.

== Demographics ==
Historical population
Census	Pop.	Note	%±
1850	394		—
1880	349		—
1900	278		—
1910	444		59.7%
1920	564		27.0%
1930	569		0.9%
1940	626		10.0%
1950	710		13.4%
1960	894		25.9%
1970	923		3.2%
1980	1,104		19.6%
1990	1,170		6.0%
2000	987		−15.6%
2010	1,019		3.2%
2020	1,023		0.4%
U.S. Decennial Census; 2013 Estimate

=== Racial and ethnic composition ===
Carrollton town, Alabama – Racial and ethnic composition Note: the US Census treats Hispanic/Latino as an ethnic category. This table excludes Latinos from the racial categories and assigns them to a separate category. Hispanics/Latinos may be of any race. Race and ethnicity were not surveyed for populations under 2,500 in 1980 and under 1,000 in 1990.
Race / Ethnicity (NH = Non-Hispanic)	Pop 1990	Pop 2000	Pop 2010	Pop 2020	% 1990	% 2000	% 2010	% 2020
White alone (NH)	662	527	462	479	56.58%	53.39%	45.34%	46.82%
Black or African American alone (NH)	501	439	437	398	42.82%	44.48%	42.89%	38.91%
Native American or Alaska Native alone (NH)	2	0	1	1	0.17%	0.00%	0.10%	0.10%
Asian alone (NH)	3	1	0	2	0.26%	0.10%	0.00%	0.20%
Native Hawaiian or Pacific Islander alone (NH)	x	0	0	0	x	0.00%	0.00%	0.00%
Other race alone (NH)	0	0	1	1	0.00%	0.00%	0.10%	0.10%
Mixed race or Multiracial (NH)	x	16	12	40	x	1.62%	1.18%	3.91%
Hispanic or Latino (any race)	2	4	106	102	0.17%	0.41%	10.40%	9.97%
Total	1,170	987	1,019	1,023	100.00%	100.00%	100.00%	100.00%

=== 2020 census ===
As of the 2020 census, Carrollton had a population of 1,023. The median age was 34.1 years. 24.3% of residents were under the age of 18 and 13.6% were 65 years of age or older. For every 100 females, there were 110.9 males, and for every 100 females age 18 and over, there were 118.0 males.

0.0% of residents lived in urban areas, while 100.0% lived in rural areas.

There were 355 households, including 218 family households. Of all households, 39.4% had children under the age of 18 living in them. 36.3% were married-couple households, 17.5% were households with a male householder and no spouse or partner present, and 41.7% were households with a female householder and no spouse or partner present. About 30.7% of households were made up of individuals, and 11.9% had someone living alone who was 65 years of age or older.

There were 399 housing units, of which 11.0% were vacant. The homeowner vacancy rate was 1.0%, and the rental vacancy rate was 10.0%.

=== 2010 census ===
As of the 2010 United States census, there were 1,019 people living in the town. 49.0% were White, 43.1% African American, 0.1% Native American, 3.6% from some other race and 4.2% of two or more races. 10.4% were Hispanic or Latino of any race.

=== 2000 census ===
As of the census of 2000, there were 987 people, 384 households, and 279 families living in the town. The population density was 479.1 inhabitants per square mile (185.0/km^{2}). There were 437 housing units at an average density of 212.1 per square mile (81.9/km^{2}). The racial makeup of the town was 53.39% White, 44.58% Black or African American, 0.10% Asian, and 1.93% from two or more races. 0.41% of the population were Hispanic or Latino of any race.

There were 384 households, out of which 35.2% had children under the age of 18 living with them, 40.1% were married couples living together, 28.9% had a female householder with no husband present, and 27.3% were non-families. 25.5% of all households were made up of individuals, and 14.8% had someone living alone who was 65 years of age or older. The average household size was 2.57 and the average family size was 3.07.

In the town, the population was spread out, with 29.4% under the age of 18, 10.5% from 18 to 24, 23.7% from 25 to 44, 20.5% from 45 to 64, and 15.9% who were 65 years of age or older. The median age was 34 years. For every 100 females, there were 77.8 males. For every 100 females age 18 and over, there were 65.2 males.

The median income for a household in the town was $24,318, and the median income for a family was $29,612. Males had a median income of $30,833 versus $18,333 for females. The per capita income for the town was $12,153. About 31.4% of families and 38.5% of the population were below the poverty line, including 56.9% of those under age 18 and 26.1% of those age 65 or over.

== Education ==
The Pickens County Board of Education is located in Carrollton. Carrollton Unit School faced closure around 2006 and was formerly known as the Indians (mascot) Carrollton is also the home of the Pickens County Educational Center, a branch of Bevill State Community College.

== Notable people ==
- Hanley Funderburk, president of Auburn University from 1980 to 1983
- Walter Jones, NFL All Pro football player and part of the NFL Hall of Fame
- John H. Kelly, one of the youngest generals to die during the American Civil War at the age of 24
- Homer H. Norton, head coach for Texas A&M from 1934 to 1947
- Lewis M. Stone, lawyer and politician
- Courtney Taylor, Auburn University and Seattle Seahawks wide receiver

== Gallery ==
Below are photographs taken in Carrollton as part of the Historic American Buildings Survey conducted during the Great Depression to document the buildings across the US:

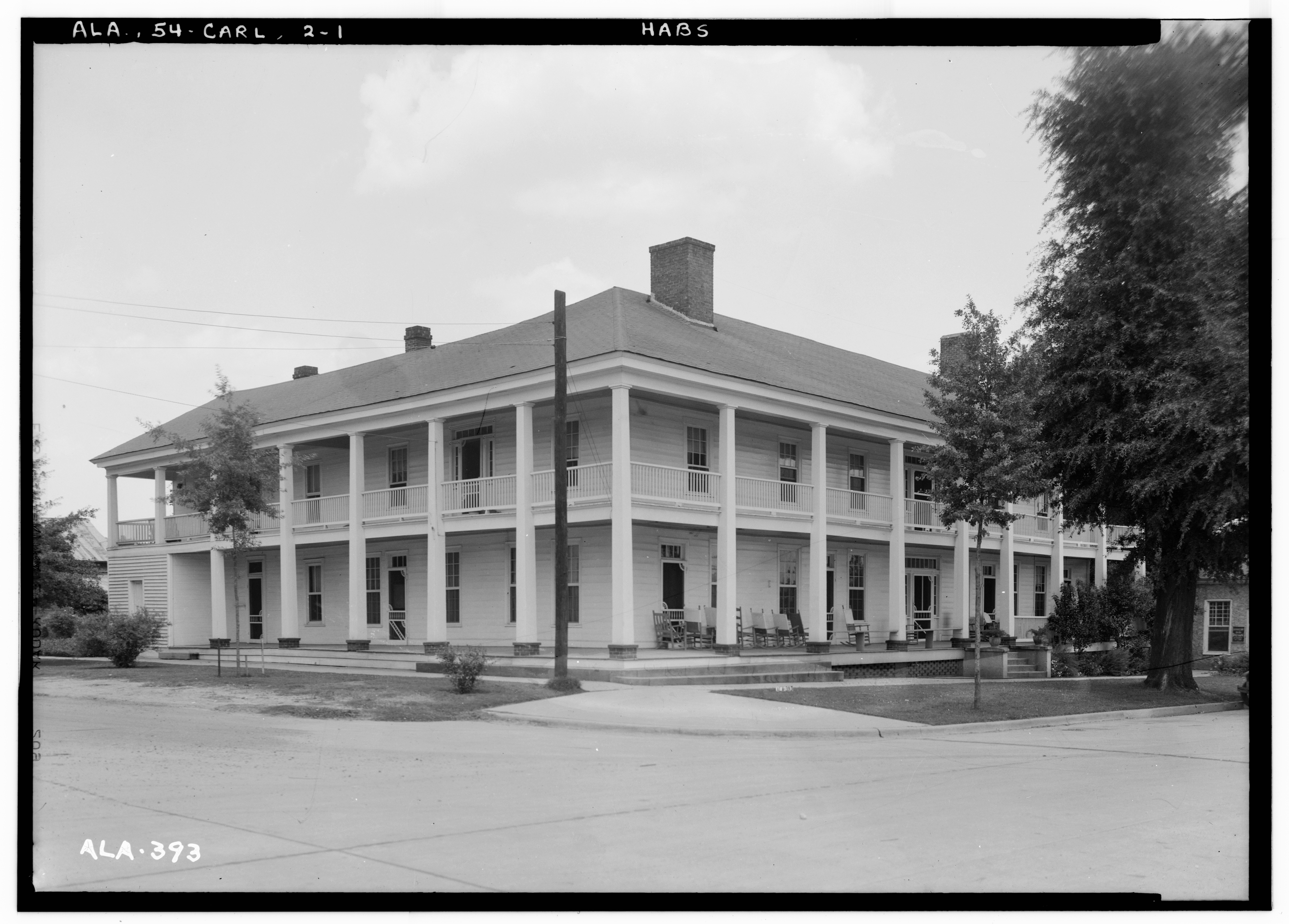
Phoenix Hotel

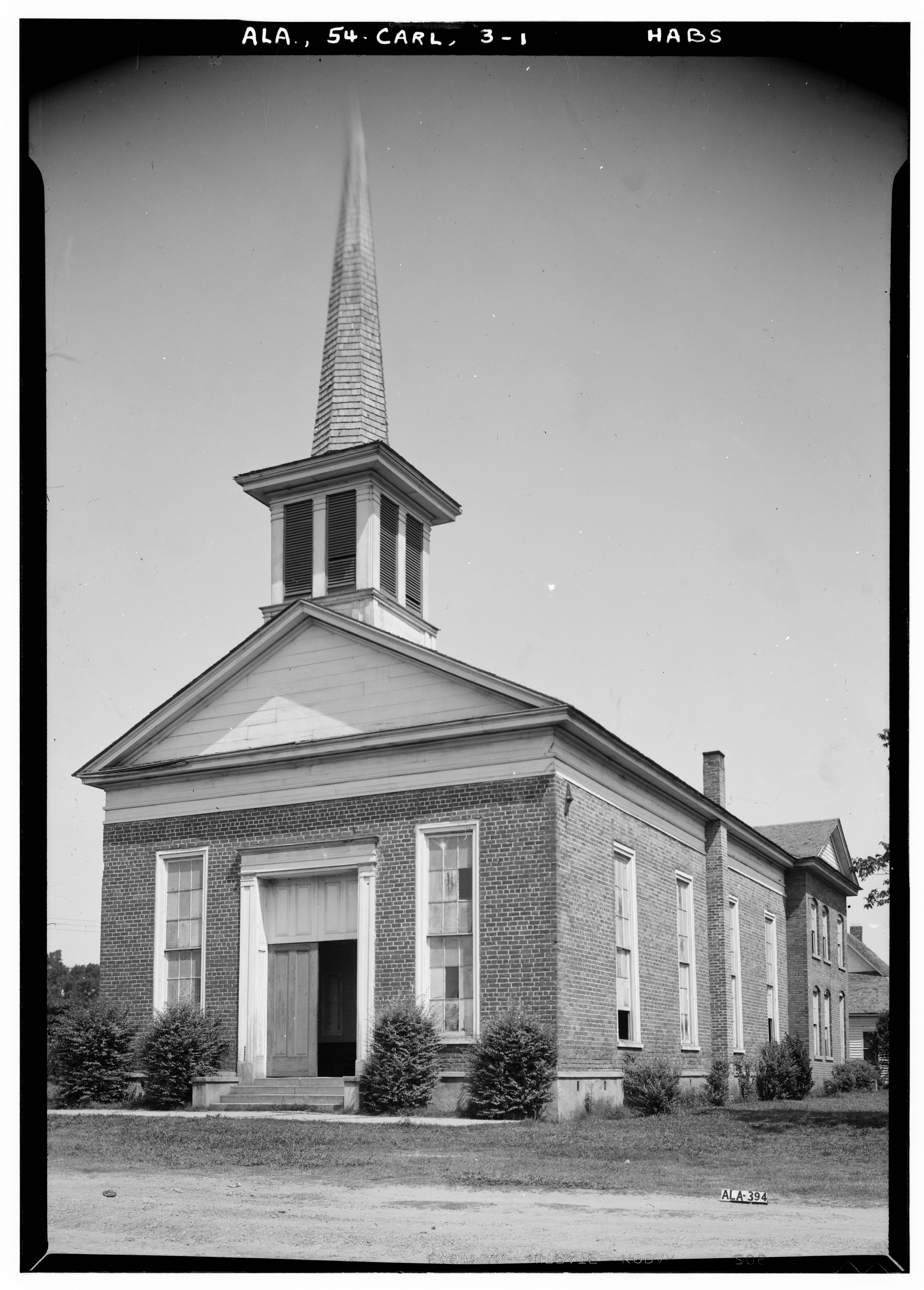
Methodist Episcopal Church
