= John C. Carter =

American lawyer and Confederate States Army civil war general

John Carpenter Carter
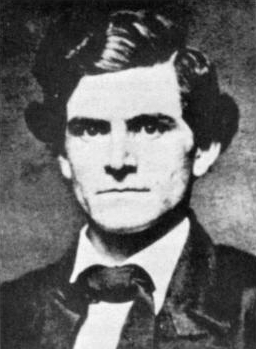
- Born: December 19, 1837; Waynesboro, Georgia, U.S.
- Died: December 10, 1864 (aged 26); Franklin, Tennessee, C.S.
- Burial place: Rose Hill Cemetery, Columbia, Tennessee, US
- Spouse: Elizabeth Jane Lowell
- Military career
- Allegiance: Confederate States of America
- Branch: Confederate States Army
- Service years: 1861–1864 (CSA)
- Rank: Brigadier General
- Conflicts: American Civil War: Battle of Shiloh; Battle of Perryville; Battle of Stones River; Battle of Chickamauga; Atlanta campaign; Second Battle of Franklin †

John Carpenter Carter (December 19, 1837 – December 10, 1864) was an American lawyer who became brigadier general of the Confederate States Army during the American Civil War, and died of wounds received at the Battle of Franklin, Tennessee.

== Early life, education and legal career ==
Carter was born in Waynesboro, Georgia, on December 19, 1837, to Angelina Carter and her husband, Dr. Edward J. Carter (1814–1869). By 1850, his elder brother Isiah had died, so John was the family's eldest son, with three younger sisters, although another brother Alexander would survive his parents. His father owned 52 slaves in 1850: 25 males and 27 females.

Carter attended the University of Virginia from 1854 to 1856, then studied law under Judge Abram Carruthers at Cumberland University in Lebanon, Tennessee. He became an instructor at the school after graduating, and married the judge's daughter. He was practicing law in Memphis, Tennessee, when the Civil War began.

== Civil War service ==
Carter entered the war as a captain in the 38th Tennessee Infantry Regiment and quickly became its colonel. He commanded the regiment during the Battle of Shiloh, Battle of Perryville, Battle of Stones River, Battle of Chickamauga and Atlanta campaign. Carter was promoted to brigadier general to rank from July 7, 1864. He temporarily commanded a division at the Battle of Jonesboro. Carter was mortally wounded during the Battle of Franklin on November 30, 1864, and died December 10 in the Harrison home, 3 miles (4.8 km) south of the battlefield.

== Aftermath ==
Carter was buried at Rose Hill Cemetery, Columbia, Tennessee. The Brigadier General John Carpenter Carter Camp 207, Sons of Confederate Veterans in Waynesboro, Georgia, is named for Carter.

== See also ==
- List of American Civil War generals (Confederate)
