= Samuel W. Oliver =

American politician (1796–1838)

Samuel White Oliver

Speaker of the Alabama House of Representatives
- In office 1832–1835
- Preceded by: Arthur P. Bagby
- Succeeded by: William I. Adair

Personal details
- Born: June 8, 1796 Charlotte County, Virginia
- Died: January 17, 1838 (aged 41) Pine Barren Creek, Dallas County, Alabama

Samuel White Oliver (June 8, 1796 – January 1838), was an American lawyer and Alabama state legislator who represented Conecuh County in the Alabama House of Representatives from 1822 to 1834 and served as Speaker of the Alabama House of Representatives for three consecutive sessions (1832–33, 1833–34, 1834–35). He was an unsuccessful candidate for governor in 1837 (1837 Alabama gubernatorial election), losing to Arthur P. Bagby.

Oliver was born in Charlotte County, Virginia and spent part of his early life in Clarke County, Georgia. He graduated from Franklin College (now the University of Georgia) in 1816 and attended the Litchfield Law School in 1820, reading law in the office of Augustin Smith Clayton.

In 1819 he moved to Conecuh County, Alabama and practiced law near the county seat at Sparta. He entered public office in 1822. Contemporary county histories and legislative journals note that he served continuously in the House through 1834, was elected Speaker during the 1832–33, 1833–34, and 1834–35 sessions, and won a seat in the state senate for Conecuh and Butler counties in 1836.

Oliver relocated to Dallas County in 1837 and died at his residence on Pine Barren Creek in January 1838.
