= Clement Clay Shorter =

American politician

Clement Clay Shorter (February 1, 1856-June 16,1890) was a politician in Alabama who served as Speaker of the Alabama House of Representatives.

Named after his father's close friend Clement Claiborne Clay Jr., he was born in Eufaula to a family that was prominent in the politics of Alabama and Georgia. His uncle was Alabama governor John Gill Shorter and his father, Eli Sims Shorter, was a U.S. congressman and colonel in the Confederate Army during the American Civil War.

Shorter graduated from the University of Alabama and became a lawyer.

He represented Barbour County for three terms in the Alabama House. He served as Speaker of the Alabama House of Representatives in 1888. In December 9, 1890 he was memorialized in the Alabama House after his death in 1890. The University of Alabama Libraries have an April 23, 1880 letter he wrote to Mrs. H. D. Clayton (Victoria Virginia Clayton).
