= Wilbur F. Foster =

American politician (1841–1900)

Speaker of the Alabama House of Representatives, Macon County
- In office 1882–1883

Alabama House of Representatives
- In office 1882–1883

Alabama House of Representatives
- In office 1880–1881

Personal details
- Born: Wilbur Fisk Foster; September 13, 1841 Louisburg, North Carolina, U.S.
- Died: February 11, 1900 (aged 58) Tuskegee, Alabama, U.S.
- Resting place: Tuskegee City Cemetery, Tuskegee, Alabama, U.S.
- Party: Democratic Party
- Occupation: Politician, lawyer, military soldier

Military service
- Branch/service: Confederate States Army
- Rank: Private
- Unit: 3rd Alabama Infantry Regiment
- Battles/wars: American Civil War

Wilbur Fisk Foster, also known as W. F. Foster (1841–1900) was an American politician, lawyer and military soldier in Tuskegee, Alabama. He served in the Confederate States Army, was a member of the Alabama House of Representatives for three terms, and was the Speaker of the Alabama House of Representatives. Foster helped finance the Tuskegee Normal School for Colored Teachers (later Tuskegee University), in exchange for Black votes.

== Life and career ==
Wilbur F. Foster was in a private in company C of the 3rd Alabama Infantry Regiment of the Confederate States Army. He was wounded in his lung at the 1862 Battle of Malvern Hill in Henrico County, Virginia.

Foster served as a member of the Alabama House of Representatives for three term from 1878–1879, 1880–1881, and 1882–1883. In his last term, 1882 to 1883, Foster served as the Speaker of the Alabama House of Representatives. He was a member of the Alabama Legislature, but is sometimes incorrectly referred to as a senator.

Foster pledged to help establish a Black normal school to train teachers, in exchange for Black support for his 1880 Alabama re-election campaign. He followed through and gave USD $2,000 to help establish Tuskegee Normal School for Colored Teachers, the school that preceded Tuskegee University, a historically black university.

Foster served as the temporary chairman of the Democratic Convention in 1886; and he was president of the Alabama State Bar in 1887 to 1888.

Foster died on February 11, 1900, in Tuskegee, Alabama, and is buried in the Tuskegee City Cemetery.
