= Walter H. Crenshaw =

American politician

Walter H. Crenshaw was the Speaker of the Alabama House of Representatives during the American Civil War. He also served as President of the Alabama Senate.

A Democrat, he represented Butler County, Alabama.
