= Pickens County Courthouse (Alabama) =

- U.S. National Register of Historic Places
- Alabama Register of Landmarks and Heritage
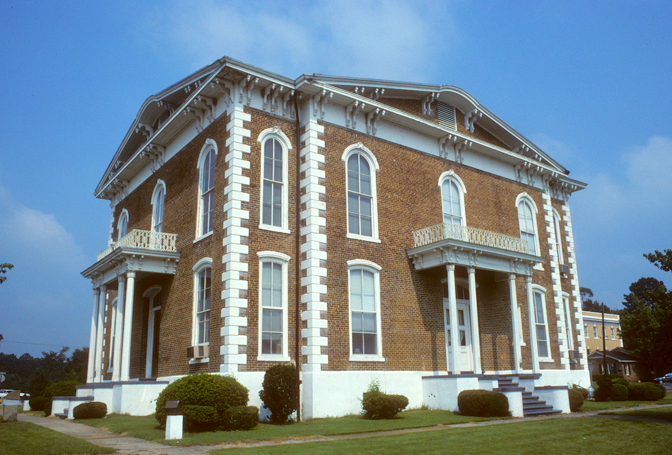

- Location within Alabama
- Interactive map showing the location for Pickens County Courthouse
- Location: Carrollton, Alabama
- Coordinates: 33°15′42.37″N 88°5′42.31″W
- Built: 1877
- Architectural style: Italianate
- NRHP reference No.: 94000441

Significant dates
- Added to NRHP: May 19, 1994
- Designated ARLH: July 23, 1976

The Pickens County Courthouse in the county seat of Carrollton, Alabama is the courthouse for Pickens County, Alabama. Built in 1877–1878 as the third courthouse in the city, it is noted for a ghostly image that can be seen in one of its garret windows. This is claimed to be the face of freedman Henry Wells from 1878.

According to a common version of the myth, Wells was arrested in January 1878 on suspicion of burglary and arson, and lynched by a white mob soon after his arrest. He was alleged to have burned down the second courthouse in 1876 (built to replace one destroyed in 1865 by Union forces during the Civil War). Accounts in the story do not conform to historic facts; for instance, the windows were not installed until February through March 1878, so they could not contain his image.

This period was one of the continuing social and racial tensions. In 1877, the federal government ended Reconstruction and withdrew its troops from the South. White Democrats had regained control of state legislatures and passed measures to impose white supremacy. Wells was arrested in January 1878 and charged with the courthouse burning two years before. A local newspaper reported that Wells died of wounds after being shot while fleeing arrest for robbery in January 1878; he reportedly confessed to burning the courthouse before dying.

A total of 15 African Americans were lynched in Pickens County, many in the courthouse square, from 1877 to 1917. This was the fifth-highest total of any county in the state. A mass lynching was committed by a white crowd who fatally shot four black men and a black woman in their cells in September 1893. They were suspects in the burning of a cotton gin owned by a white man.

== Origins of the Wells story ==
The story of Wells' face in the courthouse window seems to have been a conflation through the myth of two historic events, that of the lynching of a white man named Nathaniel Pierce, and that of the arrest and shooting of an African American man named Henry Wells. He later confessed to burning down the courthouse, likely under coercion, and died of his wounds. White guilt may have contributed to the account of Wells cursing the town and threatening they would be haunted by him.

This period was one of turmoil, as the federal government was withdrawing the last of its troops from the South, formally ending Reconstruction. White Democrats had already regained control of the state legislature and on the local level, white minorities used racial violence to impose and maintain white supremacy. As the 19th century progressed, the rate of lynchings rose, mostly directed at black men.

According to the West Alabamian, which was Carrollton's only newspaper at the time of the events, Nathaniel Pierce was being held on charges of murder when, on September 26, 1877, an armed mob forced their way into the jail where he was being held, took him outside the city, and lynched him. Pierce's lynching was not reported as having anything to do with the burning of the courthouse.

The whites in town already suspected Henry Wells and an accomplice, Bill Buckhalter, of the arson. A story in the West Alabamian on December 13, 1876, said that Wells and Buckhalter were also suspected of robbing a store on the night in 1876 when the courtroom was burned. The newspaper reported that stolen merchandise from the store was found in their homes. But that supports their part in the robbery, not arson.

Buckhalter was arrested in January 1878. He confessed to the burglary and blamed Wells for the burning of the courthouse. Wells was caught a few days later. When confronted by the police, he tried to flee and was shot twice. He confessed to burning the courthouse, likely under coercion, including beatings. He died from his wounds five days later.

These two events appeared to have been combined into the commonly told myth of how a face appeared in the courthouse window, but neither Pierce nor Wells could have been the "face in the window." Both Pierce and Wells died before the windows were installed in the new courthouse. The West Alabamian reported that windows were being installed in the courthouse on February 20, 1878. These windows were the windows in the main courtroom, which were the first windows installed to prepare for a court session scheduled in the middle of March. The garret windows, including the one with the ghostly face, were not installed until weeks after Wells' death.

== The image on the window ==
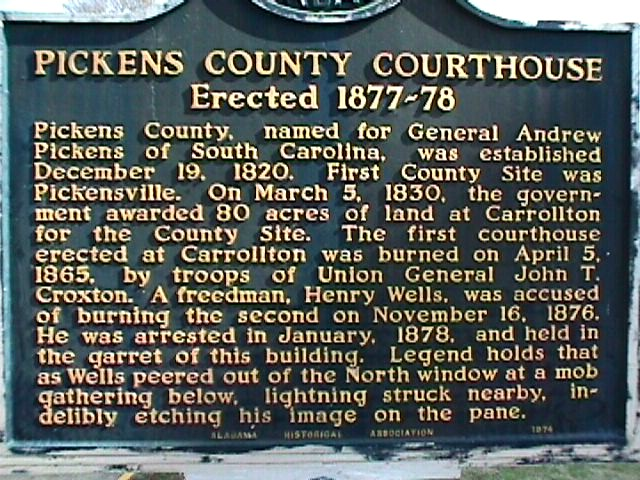
A historical sign erected in 1974 near the courthouse tells the story of the image in the window.

The Alabama Historical Association erected a historic marker in 1974 telling the role of the courthouse and the myth of Henry Wells' face in the window.

The image on the window is easily seen, although it appears to be more a face from some angles than from others. It is said that the image is only visible from outside the courthouse; from inside the pane appears to be a normal pane of glass.

Since the photo was taken, the city of Carrollton has installed a reflective highway sign with an arrow pointing to the pane where the image appears. There are permanent binoculars installed across the street from the window for those who wish to get a closer look.

In 2001, the courthouse was threatened with demolition, to be replaced with a contemporary facility. The window with the face image was covered with a piece of plywood spray-painted with a smiley face. Due to a public campaign to save the image, the courthouse is being renovated as funds become available.

== Racial aspects of the story ==
The legend is related to the racism and white racial terrorism in Alabama during and especially after the Reconstruction Era, including numerous lynchings through the early 20th century. According to a 2015 study, Pickens County had 15 lynchings after Reconstruction; the last was committed before 1917; this is the fifth-highest total of any county in the state.

Among these terrorist events was a mass lynching of five African Americans on September 14, 1893. A white mob stormed the county jail in Carrollton and shot to death in their cells Paul Archer, Will Archer, Emma Fair, Ed Guyton, and Paul Hill, freedmen (and one freedwoman) who had been arrested on charges of burning down the mill and gin house of a white man. No trial had been held. Two weeks before that Joe Floyd had also been lynched in Carrollton, without trial.

John Harding Curry, who worked as a probate judge in the courthouse, recalls being concerned during the 20th-century civil rights demonstrations in Alabama of the late 1960s and early 1970s that someone might damage the courthouse window, as it could be seen to symbolize an era of terrible racism. However, although the town had some instances of race-related vandalism, the window was never touched.

As Alan N. Brown has recounted it, another probate judge agreed to tell folktales to the 5th-grade class from a black school in Birmingham. Although he had never recounted the Wells story to a black audience, he told the students the story about the face in the courthouse window, ending his tale with a moral; "You might ask what that face in the courthouse is saying," he told the students. "It says to me, 'Don't ever let this happen again!'" He asked the students if they had any questions. One little boy raised his hand and asked, "How do you know that's a black man up there?"

== Representation in other media ==
Some version of this story was formed in the years after installation of the courthouse windows, and repeated in oral histories. In the later 20th century, the mythic account was included in compilations of ghost stories and folk tales published by whites. In this period of more than 80 years after events, separate events had repeatedly been combined into one myth: Henry Wells' story was included in Kathryn Tucker Windham's book of Alabama ghost stories, 13 Alabama Ghosts and Jeffrey (1969); Ghost Stories from the American South (1985), edited by W.K. McNeil; and Phantom Army of the Civil War and Other Southern Ghost Stories (1997), edited by Frank Spaeth and selected from FATE magazine.

In Patricia McKissack's The Dark-Thirty: Southern Tales of the Supernatural, the story "Justice" features similar indelible images appearing on windows and features a lynching in its plot (although the motive and the details of the crime are very different from the Wells myth).

In 2009 First National Bank of Central Alabama commissioned a play about the myth related to Henry Wells, the burning of the second courthouse, and the window image in the new courthouse from playwright Barry Bradford. Beginning in April 2010, his play The Face in the Courthouse Window has been produced each spring in the courtroom of the Courthouse. All proceeds from the play go toward the preservation of the Courthouse.
