= Alabama Court of Appeals =

Former appellate court of Alabama

- Established: 1911
- Dissolved: 1969
- Judge term length: 6 years
- Number of positions: 3

The Alabama Court of Appeals was the intermediate appellate court in the U.S. state of Alabama, and was founded in 1911. It ran until it was split in 1969, into the Alabama Court of Criminal Appeals and the Alabama Court of Civil Appeals. The court had three justices.

== Elections ==
Judicial elections were held to elect justices to six year terms.
