= William I. Adair =

American lawyer, judge, and politician (c. 1796–1835)

William Irvin Adair

Speaker of the Alabama House of Representatives
- In office 1823–1823
- Preceded by: Arthur P. Bagby
- Succeeded by: Samuel Walker

Judge of the Alabama Circuit Court
- In office November 1832 – December 9, 1835

Personal details
- Born: c. 1796 Kentucky, U.S.
- Died: December 9, 1835 Madison County, Alabama, U.S.

William Irvin Adair (c. 1796 – December 9, 1835), was an American lawyer and judge who served as Speaker of the Alabama House of Representatives during the 1823 session. A representative from Madison County, he was again elected to public office as a judge of the Alabama circuit court in November 1832 and served until his death in 1835.

== Biography ==
Adair was born in Kentucky, the son of William and Mary (Irvin) Adair and a nephew of Kentucky governor John Adair. He served as a captain during the War of 1812, moved to Alabama in 1818, read law, and practiced at Huntsville. He represented Madison County in the Alabama House in 1822 and 1823.

At the organizational meeting of the fifth General Assembly on November 17, 1823, the House elected Adair Speaker. The following year, the sixth General Assembly chose Samuel Walker of Madison County as Speaker.

Adair was elected to the state circuit bench in November 1832 and held that office until his death on December 9, 1835, in Madison County. Additional contemporary notices appear in Willis Brewer's compendium of Alabama public officials.
