= George F. Harrington =

American politician

George F. Harrington was a lawyer and politician on Alabama. A Republican, he served as Speaker of the Alabama House of Representatives in 1868.

He "commanded a negro regiment" and served with African Americans in the Alabama House.

He voted in favor of the 15th Amendment to the United States Constitution.

He served two terms in the Alabama House of Representatives serving from 1868 to 1870.

== See also ==
- Reconstruction era
