= Thomas Butler Cooper =

Alabama politician

Thomas Butler Cooper was a teacher, merchant, lawyer, and politician in Alabama. He served in the Alabama House of Representatives after the Civil War including as Speaker of the Alabama House of Representatives.

He was born in South Carolina. His father was from Philadelphia. He married Nancy P. Powell of Georgia in 1832.

First elected to the Alabama House in 1842, he served six terms in the Alabama legislature. He succeeded W. R. W. Cobb of Jackson in the Confederate congress after Cobb's expulsion. He was a delegate at Alabama's 1865 constitutional convention. The U.S. congress removed Confederate officers from offices in the south during the Reconstruction era. He was described as shrewd, stout, and corpulent.

An 1863 letter to Alabama governor John Gill Shorter that Cooper and others signed survives. A letter he wrote to Alabama governor Thomas Hill Watts in 1864 survives.

He helped name short-lived Baine County in honor of a Confederate civil war officer. It was succeeded by Etowah County.

James Cooper was his brother.
