= 1837 Alabama gubernatorial election =

- August 7, 1837
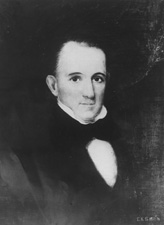

| Nominee | Arthur P. Bagby | Samuel W. Oliver |
| Party | Democratic | Anti-Van Buren Democrat |
| Popular vote | 24,419 | 20,152 |
| Percentage | 54.79% | 45.21% |
- County results Bagby: 50–60% 60–70% 70–80% 80–90% >90% Oliver: 50–60% 60–70% 70–80% 80–90% Unknown/No Vote
Governor before election
Hugh McVay
Democratic
Elected Governor
Arthur P. Bagby
Democratic

The 1837 Alabama gubernatorial election was an election held on August 7, 1837, to elect the governor of Alabama. Democratic candidate Arthur P. Bagby beat Anti-Van Buren candidate Samuel W. Oliver with 54.79% of the vote.

== General election ==
=== Candidates ===
- Arthur P. Bagby, Member of the Alabama House of Representatives 1834–1836.
- Samuel W. Oliver, Member of the Alabama House of Representatives, Speaker of the House 1832–1835.

=== Results ===
1837 Alabama gubernatorial election
| Party | Candidate | Votes | % | ±% |
|---|---|---|---|---|
| Democratic | Arthur P. Bagby | 24,419 | 54.79% | −10.65% |
| Anti-Van Buren Democrat | Samuel W. Oliver | 20,152 | 45.21% | +45.21% |
| Total votes | | 44,571 | 100% | N/A |
| Democratic hold | | | | |
