= A. N. Worthy =

Alabama politician

A. N. Worthy was a lawyer, medical doctor, Baptist preacher, and politician in Alabama. He served in the Alabama Senate representing Pike County. He was the only Alabama Senate member to vote against the 15th Amendment to the United States Constitution on November 16, 1869.

He was one of the early settlers of Troy, Alabama. He was a Democrat. He wrote about medicine and the history of the Baptist Church in Troy. He was the only Democrat in the Alabama Senate.

He supported the expansion of slavery to Kansas. In 1854 he was an incorporator of the Troy Fire Company.

He had three children. He died in 1873.
