= J. Lee Long =

American politician from Alabama (1868–1929)

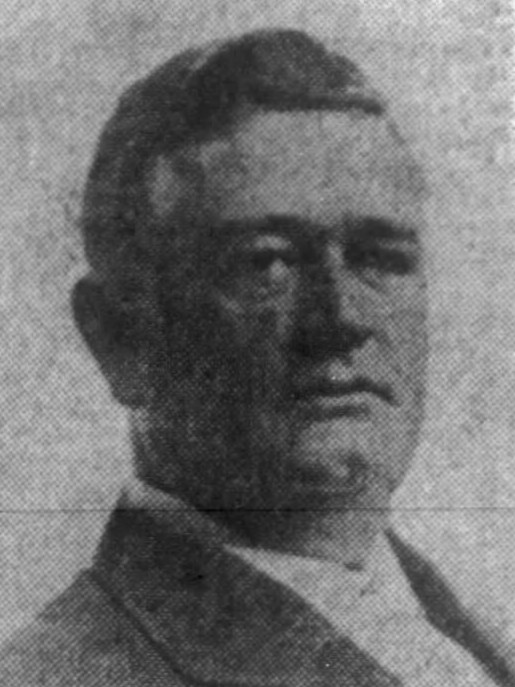

John Lee Long (January 12, 1868-1929) was a businessman and state legislator in Alabama. The J. Lee Long Bridge is named for him. He was a Democrat. He served as Speaker of the Alabama House of Representatives in 1927.

He was born in Greenville in 1868. He served on Greenville's city council, as city treasurer and on the local school board. He served on the staff of Alabama governor Joseph F. Johnston before being elected to the Alabama House of Representatives in 1906. He served several terms and held the office of State Tax staff. He represented Butler County, Alabama.

He was a delegate to Alabama's 1901 constitutional convention.

He was involved in mercantile, farming, and lumbering. He married Sallie Dickerson of Greenville. He died in the same house in which he was born.

== See also ==
- 1930 Alabama House of Representatives election
