= Hugh Davis Merrill =

American politician (1877–1954)

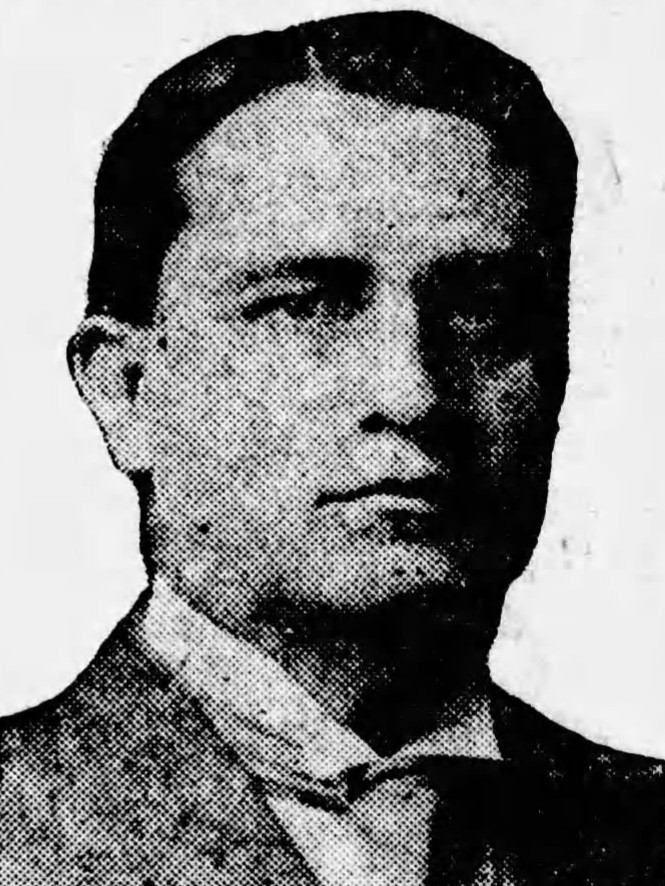

Speaker of the Alabama House of Representatives
- In office 1939–1939
- Preceded by: Maurice L. Robertson
- Succeeded by: George O. Miller
- In office 1923–1927
- Preceded by: Seybourn A. Lynne
- Succeeded by: J. Lee Long

12th Lieutenant Governor of Alabama
- In office January 19, 1931 – January 14, 1935
- Governor: Benjamin M. Miller
- Preceded by: William C. Davis
- Succeeded by: Thomas E. Knight

Personal details
- Born: December 20, 1877 Franklin, Georgia, US
- Died: January 5, 1954 (aged 76) Anniston, Alabama, US
- Party: Democratic
- Spouse: Martha Chitwood (m. 1906)
- Education: University of Alabama School of Law
- Occupation: Lawyer

Hugh Davis Merrill (December 20, 1877 – January 5, 1954) was an American lawyer and politician who served as the 12th lieutenant governor of Alabama from 1931 to 1935.

== Biography ==
Hugh Davis Merrill was born in Franklin, Georgia on December 20, 1877. He graduated from Oxford College in Oxford, Alabama in 1896, and earned a law degree at the University of Alabama in 1897.

He married Martha Chitwood on December 27, 1906, and they had four children.

Merrill died in Anniston, Alabama on January 5, 1954.

John Merrill, who serves as Secretary of State of Alabama, is a relative.

Political offices
Preceded by William C. Davis	Lieutenant Governor of Alabama; 1931–1935	Succeeded by Thomas E. Knight
