= John H. Kelly =

John Herbert Kelly
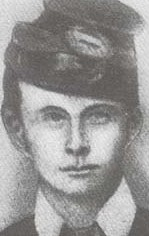
- John H. Kelly, Brigadier General in the Confederate Army
- Born: March 31, 1840; Carrollton, Alabama
- Died: September 4, 1864 (aged 24); Franklin, Tennessee
- Burial place: Magnolia Cemetery, Mobile, Alabama
- Military career
- Allegiance: Confederate States of America
- Branch: Confederate States Army
- Service years: 1861–1864 (CSA)
- Rank: Brigadier General (CSA)
- Nickname: The Boy General of the Confederacy
- Commands: 8th Arkansas Infantry Regiment; Kelly's Brigade
- Conflicts: American Civil War; Battle of Shiloh; Battle of Murfreesboro; Battle of Perryville; Battle of Chickamauga; Battle of Pickett's Mill; Franklin-Nashville Campaign †

John Herbert Kelly (March 31, 1840 – September 4, 1864) was, at the time of his promotion, the youngest brigadier general in the Confederate States Army. He became one of the youngest generals to die during the American Civil War, at the age of 24. His death occurred during an engagement at Franklin, Tennessee, on September 2, 1864, during Major General Joseph Wheeler's raid into Tennessee in August and early September 1864 in an attempt to destroy the railroad that Union Army Major General William Tecumseh Sherman was using to supply his force from Chattanooga, Tennessee, during the Atlanta campaign.

== Early life and career ==
John Herbert Kelly was born in 1840 to Isham Kelly and Elizabeth Herbert at their home in Carrollton, Alabama. Kelly's father died while in Cuba when John was four, and his mother died three years later. His grandmother Harriet Herbert Hawthorne took responsibility of the young orphan. When John was about seventeen he received an appointment to West Point through the help of his uncle, Congressman Philemon T. Herbert and another relative Congressman William W. Boyce. A few months before his graduation in 1861 his home state of Alabama seceded from the Union. Hearing the news Kelly left West Point and headed to Montgomery.

== Civil War service ==
After arriving in Montgomery Kelly joined the Confederate Army with the rank of second lieutenant. He then was assigned to Fort Morgan where he would stay until the fall of 1861. During that time Kelly left Fort Morgan with Brig. Gen. William J. Hardee to Missouri. It was here that he was appointed captain and assistant adjutant general on Hardee's staff. In 1862 Kelly was appointed major of the 9th Arkansas Infantry Battalion, which he led into battle at Shiloh. One month later Kelly became colonel of the 8th Arkansas Infantry Regiment.

In October of that year he fought at the Battle of Perryville. Later in 1862 he fought at the Battle of Murfreesboro where he was wounded. Kelly commanded a large brigade of men at Chickamauga consisting of the 5th Kentucky, 58th North Carolina, 63rd Virginia, and the 65th Georgia Infantry Regiments. He lost 300 men at Chickamauga within the one hour. Also during the battle while leading his troops Kelly had a horse shot out from under him. Because of his bravery at the Battle of Chickamauga generals Cleburne, Liddell, and Preston asked for a promotion for Kelly. General Cleburne told Confederate Secretary of War James Seddon of Kelly, "I know no better officer of his grade in the service." On November 16, 1863, John Kelly was promoted to a brigadier general at age 23. Kelly's brigade was one of the key factors at the Battle of Pickett's Mill that lead to the Confederate victory.

== Capture and death ==
In August and September 1864 Kelly's Brigade fought at Franklin, Tennessee, during Wheeler's raid on Sherman's railroad supply line. While leading a charge at a skirmish near Franklin on September 2, Kelly was shot in the chest by a Union sharpshooter. Kelly was immediately taken to the Harrison House to be seen by doctors. At the Confederate retreat, he was too badly hurt to be moved and was forced to be left and captured by Union forces on September 3. Kelly died the following day in his bed at the Harrison House.

John Herbert Kelly was one of the youngest generals to die during the Civil War at age 24.

He was buried in the gardens of the Harrison House just south of Franklin on the day of his death. Local residents bought him a coffin and the new clothing he was buried in, except for the uniform coat which he was wearing when he died. Later in 1866 his body was moved and reburied in the Magnolia Cemetery of Mobile, Alabama. Sons Of Confederate Veterans Camp 1980 Gordo, Alabama Named In His Honor.

== See also ==
- List of American Civil War generals (Confederate)
- William Kelly
