= Speaker of the Alabama House of Representatives =

Presiding officer of the Alabama House of Representatives

The Speaker of the Alabama House of Representatives is the presiding officer of the Alabama House of Representatives, elected by House members at the Legislature’s organizational session held after each general election. The Speaker recognizes members to speak, refers bills to committees, and appoints members to House standing committees under chamber rules adopted for each four-year term.

Following Reconstruction, Democrats held the speakership continuously until 2010, when Republicans won control of the House and elected Mike Hubbard, the first Republican Speaker since Reconstruction. As of 2023, the Speaker is Nathaniel Ledbetter.

== List of speakers ==
Speaker	Terms of office	County	Party
Gabriel Moore	1818	Madison	Democratic-Republican
John W. Walker	1818	Madison	Democratic-Republican
James Dellet	1819	Monroe	Whig
George W. Owen	1820–1821	Monroe	
James Dellett	1821	Monroe	
Arthur P. Bagby	1822–1823	Monroe	
Samuel W. Oliver	1823	Conecuh	
William I. Adair	1824	Madison	
Samuel Walker	1824	Madison	
William Kelly	1825–1826	Madison	
Samuel W. Oliver	1826–1828	Conecuh	
Clement C. Clay	1828–1829	Madison	Democratic
John Gayle	1829–1830	Greene	
James Penn	1830–1832	Madison	
Samuel Walker	1832–1835	Conecuh	
James W. McClung	1835–1836	Madison	
Arthur P. Bagby	1836–1837	Monroe	
James W. McClung	1837–1839	Madison	
John Dennis Phelan	1839–1840	Tuscaloosa	
Samuel Walker	1840	Conecuh	
Robert A. Baker	1841		
David Moore	1841	Madison	
John Erwin	1842–1843	Greene	
Andrew B. Moore	1843–1845		
LeRoy Pope Walker	1847–1850	Lauderdale	
John D. Rather	1851–1853	Morgan	
William Garrett	1853–1854	Coosa	
Richard W. Walker	1855–1856	Lauderdale	
Crawford M. Jackson	1857–1858	Autauga	
Alexander B. Meek	1859–1860	Mobile	
Walter H. Crenshaw	1861–1865	Mobile	
Thomas Butler Cooper	1865–1867	Cherokee	
B. B. McCraw	1867–1868	Chambers	Republican
George F. Harrington	1868–1870	Mobile	Republican
John P. Hubbard	1870–1872	Pike	Democratic
Lewis M. Stone	1872–1873	Pickens	Democratic
Lewis E. Parsons	1872–1873	Coosa	Republican
Decatur C. Anderson	1874–1876	Mobile	Democratic
Newton Clements	1876–1877	Tuscaloosa	Democratic
David Clopton	1878–1879	Montgomery	Democratic
Nathaniel H. R. Dawson	1880–1881	Dallas	Democratic
Wilbur F. Foster	1882–1883	Macon	Democratic
Henry Clay Armstrong	1884–1885	Lee	Democratic
Thomas G. Jones	1886–1887	Montgomery	Democratic
Clement Clay Shorter	1888–1889	Barbour	Democratic
Newton Clements	1890–1891	Tuscaloosa	Democratic
Francis L. Pettus	1892–1893	Dallas	
Thomas H. Clark	1894–1895	Montgomery	
Newton Clements	1896–1897	Tuscaloosa	Democratic
Charles E. Waller	1898–1899	Hale	Democratic
Francis L. Pettus	1901	Dallas	
Alfred M. Tunstall	1903	Hale	Democratic
Charles C. Adams	1907	Tallapoosa	Democratic
Roberts H. Brown	1909	Lee	Democratic
William L. Martin	1911		
Archibald H. Carmichael	1907–1911		
Edward B. Almon	1911	Colbert	Democratic
Archibald H. Carmichael	1915–1919	Colbert	Democratic
Henry P. Merritt	1919	Macon	Democratic
Seybourn A. Lynne	1920–1921	Morgan	Democratic
Hugh D. Merrill	1923–1927	Calhoun	Democratic
J. Lee Long	1927	Butler	Democratic
Alfred M. Tunstall	1931–1935	Hale	Democratic
Robert H. Walker	1935–1937	Limestone	
Hugh Davis Merrill	1939	Calhoun	Democratic
George O. Miller	1942–1943	Sumter	Democratic
Charles D. Norman	1945	Bullock	Democratic
William M. Beck	1947–1949	DeKalb	Democratic
Roberts H. Brown	1951–1953	Lee	Democratic
Rankin Fite	1955–1957	Marion	Democratic
Charles C. Adams	1959	Tallapoosa	Democratic
Virgis M. Ashworth	1961	Bibb	Democratic
Albert Brewer	1963–1967	Morgan	Democratic
Rankin Fite	1967–1971	Marion	Democratic
G. Sage Lyons	1971–1975	Mobile	Democratic
Joe McCorquodale	1975–1983	Clarke	Democratic
Tom Drake	1983–1987	Cullman	Democratic
James S. Clark	1987–1999	Barbour	Democratic
Seth Hammett	1999–2010	Covington	Democratic
Mike Hubbard	2010–2016	Lee	Republican
Victor Gaston (acting)	2016	Mobile	Republican
Mac McCutcheon	2016–2022	Madison	Republican
Nathaniel Ledbetter	2023–present	DeKalb	Republican

== Notes ==
- Contemporary House journals document key 1830s–1840s speakerships: Samuel W. Oliver (1832–33), John Dennis Phelan (1839–40), and Robert A. Baker (1841 called session).
- McClung’s repeated speakerships (1835–36; 1837–39) are also noted in archival descriptions of his papers.
- Bagby’s early and later turns as Speaker are summarized by reference works on Alabama political history.
