= 1942 Alabama Senate election =

- November 3, 1942

All 35 seats in the Alabama State Senate 18 seats needed for a majority
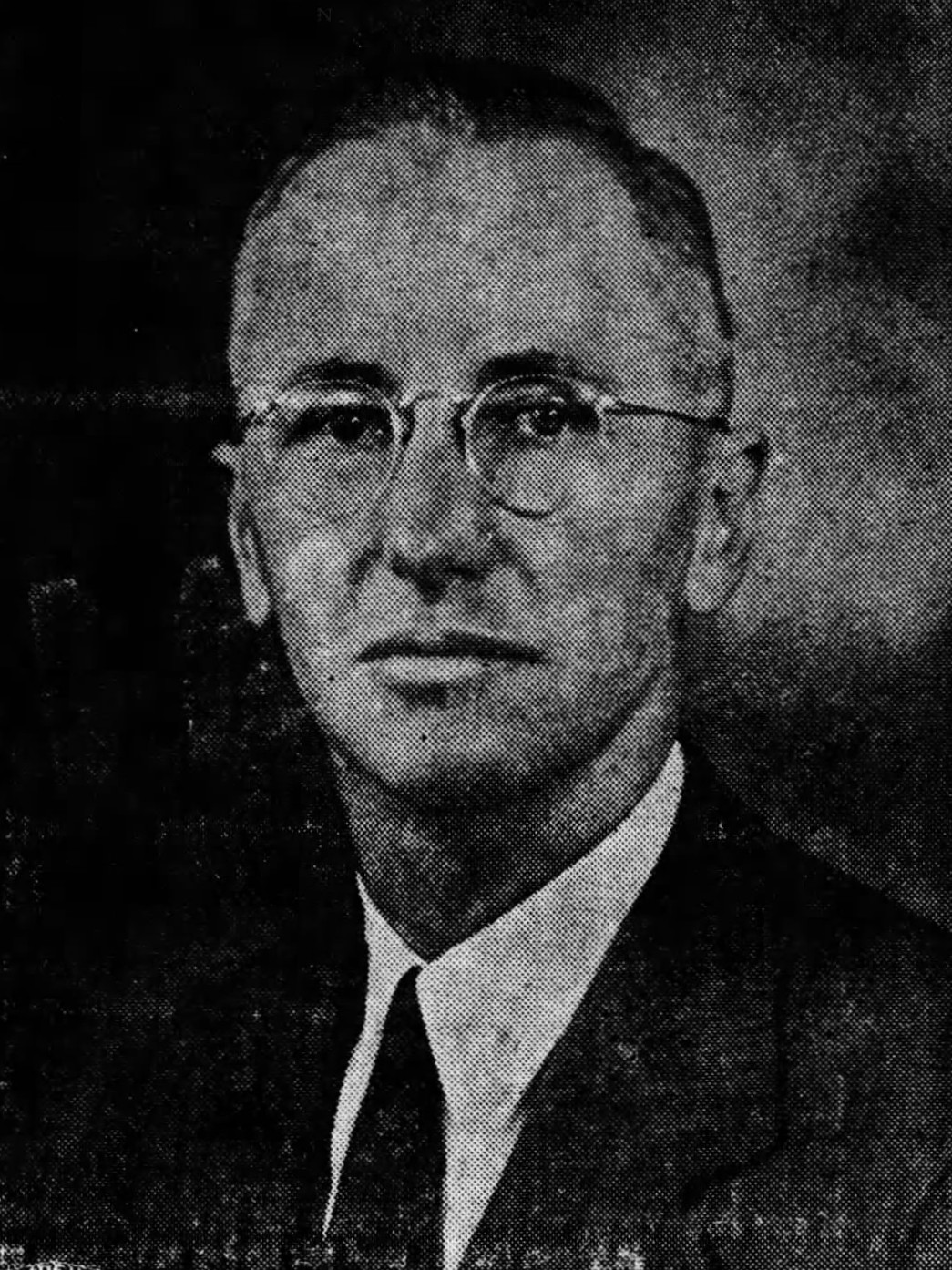

	Majority party	Minority party
Leader	Joseph N. Poole (did not stand)	—
Party	Democratic	Republican
Leader since	January 10, 1939	—
Leader's seat	17th–Butler Co.	—
Last election	35 seats, 93.50%	0 seats, 6.47%
Seats won	35	0
Popular vote	67,792	380
Percentage	99.41%	0.56%
- Winners by vote share Democratic: 90–100% Unopposed
President pro tempore before election
Joseph N. Poole
Democratic
Elected President pro tempore
James A. Simpson
Democratic

The 1942 Alabama Senate election took place on Tuesday, November 3, 1942, to elect 35 representatives to serve four-year terms in the Alabama Senate. The election used the same districts first drawn by the Alabama Constitution of 1901.

As the Democratic Party was dominant in the state, state legislative seats were generally decided at the Democratic primary election. The first round of the Democratic primary was held on May 7 with runoff elections on June 4. Only one Democratic nominee, incumbent senator James A. Simpson in Jefferson County's District 13, faced opposition in the general election, receiving 95.59% of the vote against a Republican and a Communist. Simpson was unanimously elected President pro tempore at the November 1942 opening session.

The election took place concurrently with elections for U.S. Senate, U.S. House, governor, state house, and numerous other state and local offices.

== Summary ==
Party	Candidates			Seats		
Party	Num.	Vote	%	Before	Won	+/–
Democratic	35	67,792	99.41%	35	35	Steady
Republican	1	380	0.56%	0	0	Steady
Communist	1	20	0.028%	0	0	Steady
Write-in	1	1	0.001%	—	0	Steady
Total	38	68,192	100%	35	35	Steady

== Incumbents ==
=== Won re-election ===
- District 3: Finis E. St. John Jr. won re-election.
- District 4: Charles E. Shaver won re-election.
- District 13: James A. Simpson won re-election.
- District 20: O. D. Carlton won re-election.
- District 22: J. Bruce Henderson won re-election.
- District 24: Preston C. Clayton won re-election.
- District 28: Charles A. Stakely won re-election.

=== Eliminated in primary ===
- District 7: Henry H. Booth lost renomination to Elvin McCary.
- District 33: Daniel T. McCall lost renomination to Vincent F. Kilborne.

=== Did not seek re-election ===
- District 1: William W. Malone did not seek re-election.
- District 2: Norman W. Harris was elected to Morgan County's first state house seat.
- District 5: Herbert H. Conway unsuccessfully ran for circuit solicitor from the 9th Judicial Circuit.
- District 6: John A. Lusk did not seek re-election.
- District 8: W. L. Howard did not seek re-election.
- District 9: Dan Boyd unsuccessfully ran for circuit solicitor from the 5th Judicial Circuit.
- District 10: T. H. Street sought election to Tallapoosa County's first state house seat, but withdrew before the Democratic primary.
- District 11: Hayse Tucker unsuccessfully ran for U.S. Representative from Alabama's 6th congressional district.
- District 12: Oliver E. Young did not seek re-election.
- District 14: R. B. Doughty did not seek re-election. Doughty succeeded Sen. Verdo Elmore after a March 1940 special election.
- District 15: Karl C. Harrison unsuccessfully ran for U.S. Representative from Alabama's 6th congressional district.
- District 16: Renzo Guy unsuccessfully ran for agriculture commissioner.
- District 17: Joseph N. Poole was elected agriculture commissioner.
- District 18: Howard Cooper did not seek re-election.
- District 19: P. F. DeVane was elected member of the State Democratic Executive Committee from Alabama's 1st congressional district.
- District 21: W. C. Holmes did not seek re-election.
- District 23: Clyde M. Segrest was elected to Geneva County's first county commission district. Segrest succeeded Sen. Tim Faulk after a September 1939 special election.
- District 25: J. M. Rowe unsuccessfully ran for Coffee County's sole state house seat.
- District 26: Watkins C. Johnston resigned to serve in the Navy.
- District 27: W. A. Dozier did not seek re-election.
- District 29: E. M. Baker did not seek re-election.
- District 30: C. C. Thomas did not seek re-election.
- District 31: Z. L. Weatherford did not seek re-election.
- District 32: E. F. Hildreth did not seek re-election.
- District 34: A. L. Crumpton did not seek re-election.
- District 35: W. Perry Calhoun was elected to Houston County's third county commission district.

== General election results ==
=== District 13 (Jefferson) ===
District 13 election
Party	Candidate	Votes	%
Democratic	James A. Simpson (inc.)	8,639	95.59%
Republican	Frank Snedeker	380	4.20%
Communist	Mary B. Southard	19	0.21%
Total votes		9,038	100.00%

=== Elected without opposition ===
Every candidate elected with no opponents was a Democrat.

- District 1: Orlan B. Hill received 1,568 votes.
- District 2: Vernon L. St. John received 1,805 votes.
- District 3: Finis E. St. John Jr. (inc.) received 3,796 votes. Homer Mitchell received 1 write-in vote.
- District 4: Charles E. Shaver (inc.) received 999 votes.
- District 5: J. B. Benson received 2,185 votes.
- District 6: Sam High received 3,895 votes.
- District 7: Elvin McCary received 971 votes.
- District 8: Kenneth A. Roberts received 928 votes.
- District 9: Will O. Watson received 1,426 votes.
- District 10: Lee Hornsby received 3,367 votes.
- District 11: Gordon Madison received 1,355 votes.
- District 12: Reuben L. Newton received 3,234 votes.
- District 14: John H. Pinson received 550 votes.
- District 15: George M. Taylor received 4,375 votes.
- District 16: J. Monroe Black received 403 votes.
- District 17: Tully A. Goodwin received 1,870 votes.
- District 18: T. J. Jones received 881 votes.
- District 19: Gerald Bradford received 1,968 votes.
- District 20: O. D. Carlton (inc.) received 590 votes.
- District 21: W. W. Garrett received 2,315 votes.
- District 22: J. Bruce Henderson (inc.) received 508 votes.
- District 23: Douglas Brown received 1,178 votes.
- District 24: Preston C. Clayton (inc.) received 684 votes.
- District 25: M. N. Dodson received 2,145 votes.
- District 26: Lawrence K. Andrews received 646 votes.
- District 27: S. L. Toomer received 880 votes.
- District 28: Charles A. Stakely (inc.) received 1,448 votes.
- District 29: Lem J. Cobb received 4,216 votes.
- District 30: E. P. Russell received 776 votes.
- District 31: Jim Smith Jr. received 2,905 votes.
- District 32: L. J. Lawson received 798 votes.
- District 33: Vincent F. Kilborn received 1,721 votes.
- District 34: Charles S. Bentley received 1,821 votes.
- District 35: M. W. Espy received 946 votes.

== Democratic primary results ==
=== Runoff results by district ===
Candidates in boldface advanced to the general election. An asterisk (*) denotes a runoff winner who trailed in the first round.

District	Winner			Loser			Total		
District	Candidate	Votes	%	Candidate	Votes	%	Votes	Maj.	Mrg.
7th	**Elvin McCary**	2,610	55.12%	H. E. Killiam	2,125	44.88%	4,735	+485	+10.24%
8th	**Kenneth A. Roberts**	2,259	51.22%	Jeff Clay III	2,151	48.78%	4,410	+108	+2.45%
10th	**Lee Hornsby**	3,172	54.32%	W. Carvell Woodall	2,668	45.68%	5,840	+504	+8.63%
13th	**James A. Simpson**	15,831	52.54%	Noble B. Hendrix	14,298	47.46%	30,129	+1,533	+5.09%
14th	**John H. Pinson***	1,803	54.37%	John A. Rogers	1,513	45.63%	3,316	+290	+8.75%
23rd	**Douglas Brown**	2,397	64.89%	Walter J. Brackin	1,297	35.11%	3,694	+1,100	+29.78%
Sources: Alabama Official and Statistical Register, 1951 (p. 590), The Piedmont Journal

=== First round results by district ===
Candidates in boldface advanced to either the general election or a runoff, first-place winners with an asterisk (*) did not face a runoff.

District	First place			Runners-up			Others			Total		
District	Candidate	Votes	%	Candidate	Votes	%	Candidate	Votes	%	Votes	Maj.	Mrg.
2nd	**Vernon L. St. John***	5,116	57.12%	Charles E. Bragg	3,840	42.88%	—	—	—	8,956	+1,276	+14.25%
3rd	**Finis E. St. John Jr. (inc.)***	5,070	56.10%	Ray Mayhall	1,832	20.27%	2 others (Note: Bart J. Cowart: 1,213 votes, 13.42%; Whitfield Lamberth: 922 votes, 10.20%)	2,135	23.63%	9,037	+3,238	+35.83%
6th	**Sam High***	5,570	51.55%	E. L. Roberts	5,234	48.45%	—	—	—	10,804	+336	+3.11%
7th	**Elvin McCary**	1,988	33.48%	**H. E. Killiam**	**1,487**	**25.05%**	2 others (Note: Henry H. Booth (inc.): 1,365 votes, 22.99%, Rutherford Lapsley: 1,097 votes, 18.48%)	2,462	41.47%	5,937	+501	+8.44%
8th	**Kenneth A. Roberts**	2,242	46.89%	**Jeff Clay III**	**1,489**	**31.14%**	Richard B. Kelly Jr.	1,050	21.96%	4,781	+753	+15.75%
10th	**Lee Hornsby**	3,969	42.44%	**W. Carvel Woodall**	**3,405**	**36.41%**	G. Adolph Hornsby	1,977	21.14%	9,351	+564	+6.03%
11th	**Gordan Madison***	5,727	76.30%	Testus F. Windham	1,106	14.73%	Lon Smith Jr.	673	8.97%	7,506	+4,621	+61.56%
12th	**Reuben L. Newton**	5,863	44.92%	**P. P. Evans**	**2,854**	**21.87%**	2 others (Note: W. T. Kelley: 2,416 votes, 18.51%, Edward Morton: 1,918 votes, 14.70%)	4,334	33.21%	13,051	+3,009	+23.06%
13th	**James A. Simpson (inc.)**	15,992	46.90%	**Noble B. Hendrix**	**11,286**	**33.10%**	George Fry	6,822	20.01%	34,100	+4,706	+13.80%
14th	**John A. Rogers**	1,642	43.36%	**John H. Pinson**	**1,384**	**36.55%**	S. M. Blan	761	20.10%	3,787	+258	+6.81%
16th	**J. Monroe Black***	722	56.63%	Cruser M. Graves	553	43.37%	—	—	—	1,275	+169	+13.25%
19th	**Gerald Bradford***	4,595	54.86%	J. R. Wallace	3,781	45.14%	—	—	—	8,376	+814	+9.72%
20th	**O. D. Carlton (inc.)**	1,560	54.97%	W. B. Phillips	1,278	45.03%	—	—	—	2,838	+282	+9.94%
22nd	**J. Bruce Henderson (inc.)***	1,070	58.41%	S. P. Dale	762	41.59%	—	—	—	1,832	+308	+16.81%
23rd	**Douglas Brown**	2,725	48.38%	**Walter J. Brackin**	**2,519**	**44.73%**	George S. Barnard	388	6.89%	5,632	+206	+3.66%
25th	**M. N. Dodson***	4,174	51.82%	J. Roy Crow	3,881	48.18%	—	—	—	8,055	+293	+3.64%
29th	**Lem L. Cobb***	4,154	50.30%	E. A. Van Pelt	4,105	49.70%	—	—	—	8,259	+49	+0.59%
30th	**E. P. Russell**	1,975	54.47%	John L. Sherrer	1,651	45.53%	—	—	—	3,626	+324	+8.94%
31st	**Jim Smith Jr.***	7,308	73.70%	T. E. Throckmorton	1,593	16.06%	Edward A. Staley	1,015	10.24%	9,916	+5,715	+57.63%
32nd	**L. T. Lawson***	1,757	60.40%	Cullen Morgan	1,152	39.60%	—	—	—	2,909	+605	+20.80%
33rd	**Vincent F. Kilborne***	5,514	58.10%	Daniel T. McCall (inc.)	3,977	41.90%	—	—	—	9,491	+1,537	+16.19%
34th	**Charles S. Bentley**	3,227	53.23%	John C. Darden	2,835	46.77%	—	—	—	6,062	+392	+6.47%

=== Nominated without opposition ===
The following candidates automatically won the Democratic nomination, as no opponent filed to run against them:

- District 1: Orlan B. Hill received 5,586 votes.
- District 4: Charles E. Shaver (inc.) received 3,285 votes.
- District 5: J. B. Benson received 5,460 votes.
- District 9: Will O. Walton received 5,365 votes.
- District 15: George M. Taylor Jr. received 5,507 votes.
- District 17: Tully A. Goodwin received 5,339 votes.
- District 18: T. J. Jones received 3,291 votes.
- District 21: W. W. Garrett received 6,090 votes.
- District 24: Preston C. Clayton (inc.) received 3,138 votes.
- District 26: Lawrence K. Andres received 2,375 votes.
- District 27: S. L. Toomer received 3,340 votes.
- District 28: Charles A. Stakeley (inc.) received 7,453 votes.
- District 35: M. W. Espy received 3,588 votes.

== Republican candidate ==
Only one Republican ran for a state senate seat, Frank Snedeker in District 13 (Jefferson County). He was nominated along with other statewide candidates at the state Republican convention held at the Redmont Hotel in Birmingham on September 18, 1942. He won 380 votes, or 4.20 percent.

== Communist candidate ==
One candidate ran as a Communist Party USA candidate, Mary B. Southard in District 13 (Jefferson County). She was nominated at a party caucus in Birmingham that she chaired. She won 19 votes, or 0.21 percent.

== 1939–1942 special elections ==
=== District 23 (Dale–Geneva) ===
A special election in Senate District 23 (Dale–Geneva) was made necessary by the death of four-term incumbent senator Tim Faulk in July 1939. Banker and farmer Clyde M. Segrest of Slocomb unanimously received the Democratic nomination, and subsequently won the general election unopposed.

1939 Alabama Senate District 23 special general election September 5, 1939
Party	Candidate	Votes	%
Democratic	Clyde M. Segrest	983	100.00%
Total votes		983	100.00%

=== District 14 (Pickens–Sumter) ===
A special election in Senate District 14 (Pickens–Sumter) was made necessary by the resignation of incumbent senator Verdo Elmore after he was appointed the judge of the 24th Judicial Circuit. R. B. Doughty of Reform won the Democratic nomination and the general election unopposed.

1940 Alabama Senate District 14 special general election March 26, 1940
Party	Candidate	Votes	%
Democratic	R. B. Doughty	900	100.00%
Total votes		900	100.00%

== See also ==
- Category:1942 elections in Alabama
  - 1942 United States Senate election in Alabama
  - 1942 United States House of Representatives elections in Alabama
  - 1942 Alabama gubernatorial election
- 1942 United States elections
