= 1938 Alabama Senate election =

- November 8, 1938

All 35 seats in the Alabama State Senate 18 seats needed for a majority
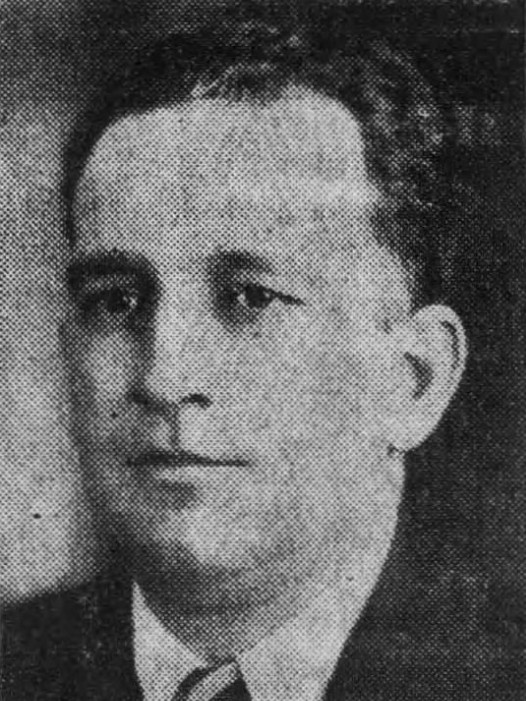

| | Majority party | Minority party |
|---|---|---|
| Leader | D. Hardy Riddle (did not stand) | — |
| Party | Democratic | Republican |
| Leader since | January 8, 1935 | — |
| Leader's seat | 8th–Talladega Co. | — |
| Last election | 35 seats, 96.54% | 0 seats, 3.46% |
| Seats won | 35 | 0 |
| Popular vote | 114,029 | 7,887 |
| Percentage | 93.50% | 6.47% |
- Winners by vote share Democratic: 60–70% 70–80% 90–100% Unopposed
President pro tempore before election
D. Hardy Riddle
Democratic
Elected President pro tempore
Joseph N. Poole
Democratic

The 1938 Alabama Senate election took place on Tuesday, November 8, 1938, to elect 35 representatives to serve four-year terms in the Alabama Senate. The election used the same districts first drawn by the Alabama Constitution of 1901.

As the Democratic Party was dominant in the state, state legislative seats were generally decided at the Democratic primary election. The first round of the Democratic primary was held on May 3 with runoff elections on June 14. Four Democratic nominees faced opposition in the general election, with all four facing a Republican and James A. Simpson additionally facing a Communist in Jefferson County's District 13. Joseph N. Poole was unanimously elected President pro tempore at the chamber's opening session on January 10, 1939.

The election took place concurrently with elections for U.S. Senate, U.S. House, governor, state house, and numerous other state and local offices.

== Summary ==
| Party | Candidates | | | Seats | | |
| Party | Num. | Vote | % | Before | Won | +/– |
|---|---|---|---|---|---|---|
| Democratic | 35 | 114,029 | 93.50% | 35 | 35 | Steady |
| Republican | 4 | 7,887 | 6.47% | 0 | 0 | Steady |
| Communist | 1 | 36 | 0.03% | 0 | 0 | Steady |
| Total | 40 | 121,952 | 100% | 35 | 35 | Steady |

== Incumbents ==
Every incumbent senator in a multi-county district did not seek re-election, as a gentlemen's agreement compelled state senators to give up their seats to allow a candidate from another county to serve. Four senators sought re-election, and four senators sought seats in the Alabama House of Representatives.

=== Won re-election ===
- District 11: Hayse Tucker won re-election.
- District 13: James A. Simpson won re-election.
- District 20: O. D. Carlton won re-election.
- District 22: J. M. Bonner won re-election.

=== Did not seek re-election ===
- District 1: L. A. Weaver did not seek re-election.
- District 2: Vernon L. St. John did not seek re-election.
- District 3: F. G. Stephens did not seek re-election.
- District 4: Schuyler H. Richardson was appointed judge of the 23rd Judicial Circuit on December 10, 1937. Richardson succeeded Shelby S. Fletcher, who died on July 1, 1936.
- District 5: I. J. Browder did not seek re-election.
- District 6: W. T. Starnes did not seek re-election.
- District 7: Max Wellborn did not seek re-election.
- District 8: D. Hardy Riddle unsuccessfully ran for governor.
- District 9: Will O. Walton was appointed judge of the 5th Judicial Circuit on February 16, 1938.
- District 10: W. Carvel Woodall did not seek re-election.
- District 12: John A. Kuykendall did not seek re-election.
- District 14: A. M. McConnell did not seek re-election. McConnell succeeded John A. Rogers, who died on September 22, 1936.
- District 15: Earle Thomas
- District 16: R. L. Goldsmith
- District 17: J. L. Kelly
- District 18: Judson C. Locke was elected to Perry County's first state house seat.
- District 19: H. L. Glover died November 29, 1936.
- District 21: G. R. Swift did not seek re-election.
- District 23: W. A. Parrish did not seek re-election.
- District 24: A. M. McDowell did not seek re-election.
- District 25: W. H. Stoddard did not seek re-election. Stoddard succeeded Thomas J. Thrower, who died July 12, 1935.
- District 26: Thomas S. Frazer did not seek re-election.
- District 27: Isham J. Dorsey did not seek re-election.
- District 28: Floyd Mooneyham did not seek re-election.
- District 29: Webb Chestnut did not seek re-election.
- District 30: Edgar P. Russell did not seek re-election.
- District 31: W. B. Mixon did not seek re-election.
- District 32: H. A. Taylor unsuccessfully ran for Hale County's first state house seat.
- District 33: C. M. A. Rogers did not seek re-election.
- District 34: Grady W. Cook was elected to Cleburne County's sole state house seat.
- District 35: D. A. Walden was elected to Henry County's first state house seat.

== General election results ==
=== By district ===
| District | Democratic | | | Republican | | | Communist | | | Total | | |
| District | Candidate | Votes | % | Candidate | Votes | % | Candidate | Votes | % | Votes | Maj. | Mrg. |
|---|---|---|---|---|---|---|---|---|---|---|---|---|
| 13th | James A. Simpson | 12,668 | 94.48% | Frank L. Snedeker | 704 | 5.25% | Robert F. Hall | 36 | 0.27% | 13,408 | +11,964 | +89.23% |
| 15th | Karl C. Harrison | 5,232 | 64.68% | Fred Allen | 2,857 | 35.32% | — | — | — | 8,089 | +2,375 | +29.36% |
| 29th | E. M. Baker | 6,227 | 69.20% | J. A. Downer | 2,772 | 30.80% | — | — | — | 8,999 | +3,455 | +38.39% |
| 31st | Zadoc L. Weatherford | 4,924 | 76.01% | Walter Denson | 1,554 | 23.99% | — | — | — | 6,478 | +3,370 | +52.02% |
Source: Alabama Official and Statistical Register, 1939 (p. 714–716)

=== Elected without opposition ===
Every candidate elected without an opponent was a Democrat.

- District 1: William M. Malone received 3,108 votes.
- District 2: Norman W. Harris received 2,715 votes.
- District 3: Finis E. St. John Jr. received 6,338 votes.
- District 4: Charles E. Shaver received 1,818 votes.
- District 5: Herbert H. Conway received 3,170 votes.
- District 6: John A. Lusk Jr. received 5,742 votes.
- District 7: Henry H. Booth received 1,670 votes.
- District 8: W. L. Howard received 1,468 votes.
- District 9: Daniel R. Boyd received 2,265 votes.
- District 10: T. H. Street received 2,975 votes.
- District 11: Hayse Tucker received 2,130 votes.
- District 12: Oliver E. Young received 6,862 votes.
- District 14: Verdo Elmore received 1,545 votes.
- District 16: Renzo Guy received 565 votes.
- District 17: Joseph N. Poole received 4,603 votes.
- District 18: Howard Cooper received 1,517 votes.
- District 19: P. F. DeVane received 4,255 votes.
- District 20: O. D. Carlton received 1,096 votes.
- District 21: W. C. Holmes received 3,801 votes.
- District 22: J. Bruce Henderson received 668 votes.
- District 23: T. S. Faulk received 2,272 votes.
- District 24: Preston C. Clayton received 1,096 votes.
- District 25: J. M. Rowe received 3,932 votes.
- District 26: Watkins C. Johnston received 1,076 votes.
- District 27: W. A. Dozier received 1,748 votes.
- District 28: Charles A. Stakely Jr. received 4,950 votes.
- District 30: C. C. Thomas received 1,156 votes.
- District 32: E. F. Hildreth received 1,253 votes.
- District 33: Daniel T. McCall received 2,762 votes.
- District 34: A. L. Crumpton received 3,749 votes.
- District 35: W. Perry Calhoun received 2,673 votes.

== Democratic primary results ==
=== Runoff results by district ===
Democratic runoffs were held on June 14. Candidates in boldface advanced to the general election. An asterisk (*) denotes a runoff winner who trailed in the first round.

| District | Winner | | | Loser | | | Total | | |
| District | Candidate | Votes | % | Candidate | Votes | % | Votes | Maj. | Mrg. |
|---|---|---|---|---|---|---|---|---|---|
| 5th | **Herbert H. Conway*** | 6,233 | 59.38% | J. J. Benford | 4,263 | 40.62% | 10,496 | +1,970 | +18.77% |
| 7th | **Frank Glenn Propst*** | 2,863 | 50.34% | Henry H. Booth | 2,824 | 49.66% | 5,687 | +39 | +0.69% |
| 9th | **Daniel R. Boyd** | 4,928 | 60.10% | J. F. Jackson | 3,272 | 39.90% | 8,200 | +1,656 | +20.20% |
| 14th | **Verdo Elmore** | 1,953 | 52.83% | L. W. Wooten | 1,744 | 47.17% | 3,697 | +209 | +5.65% |
| 15th | **Karl C. Harrison** | 3,132 | 55.01% | J. A. Hines | 2,561 | 44.99% | 5,693 | +571 | +10.03% |
| 21st | **W. C. Holmes** | 5,304 | 53.90% | W. C. Mason | 4,537 | 46.10% | 9,841 | +767 | +7.79% |
Source: Alabama Official and Statistical Register, 1939 (p. 683–685)

Additionally, runoffs in District 3, District 6, and District 29 were planned, but were canceled after candidates withdrew from their races. All three withdrawals were from candidates who placed second in the first round.

- District 3: Finis E. St. John Jr. won the Democratic nomination after W. E. James withdrew by May 22.
- District 6: John A. Lusk Jr. won the Democratic nomination after Bob Leath withdrew by May 13.
- District 29: E. M. Baker won the Democratic nomination after Lewis W. Fowler withdrew on May 20.

=== First round results by district ===
The first round of the Democratic primary was held on May 3. Candidates in boldface advanced to either the general election or a runoff, first-place winners with an asterisk (*) did not face a runoff.

| District | First place | | | Runners-up | | | Others | | | Total | | |
| District | Candidate | Votes | % | Candidate | Votes | % | Candidate | Votes | % | Votes | Maj. | Mrg. |
|---|---|---|---|---|---|---|---|---|---|---|---|---|
| 1st | **William W. Malone*** | 4,418 | 57.58% | R. H. Walker | 3,255 | 42.42% | — | — | — | 7,673 | +1,163 | +15.16% |
| 3rd | **Finis E. St. John Jr.*** | 4,116 | 48.36% | **W. E. James** (Note: Withdrew before the runoff) | **3,189** | **37.47%** | Bart J. Cowart | 1,206 | 14.17% | 8,511 | +927 | +10.89% |
| 4th | **Charles E. Shaver*** | 4,217 | 64.14% | H. M. Robertson | 2,358 | 35.86% | — | — | — | 6,575 | +1,859 | +28.27% |
| 5th | **J. J. Benford** | 3,607 | 37.39% | **Herbert H. Conway** | **3,039** | **31.51%** | Joe Johnson | 3,000 | 31.10% | 9,646 | +568 | +5.89% |
| 6th | **John A. Lusk Jr.*** | 5,613 | 48.16% | **Bob Leath** (Note: Withdrew before the runoff) | **2,386** | **20.47%** | 2 others (Note: Evan J. Owen: 2,109 votes, 18.10%; Dozier Thornton: 1,546 votes, 13.27%) | 3,655 | 31.37% | 11,654 | +3,227 | +27.69% |
| 7th | **Henry H. Booth** | 2,160 | 35.92% | **Frank Glenn Propst** | **1,711** | **28.46%** | 2 others (Note: Rutherford Lapsley: 1,534 votes, 25.51%: Farmer M. Nixon: 608 votes, 10.11%) | 2,142 | 35.61% | 6,013 | +449 | +7.47% |
| 8th | **W. L. Howard*** | 3,009 | 58.03% | W. M. Rozelle | 2,176 | 41.97% | — | — | — | 5,185 | +833 | +16.07% |
| 9th | **Daniel R. Boyd** | 3,467 | 41.88% | **J. F. Jackson** | **2,746** | **33.17%** | D. T. Ware | 2,065 | 24.95% | 8,278 | +721 | +8.71% |
| 10th | **T. H. Street*** | 5,634 | 54.65% | R. W. Stuckey | 2,685 | 26.04% | Mike J. Bulger | 1,991 | 19.31% | 10,310 | +2,949 | +28.60% |
| 11th | **Hayse Tucker*** | 4,450 | 56.88% | Luther Hearn | 2,096 | 26.79% | Ed Long | 1,277 | 16.32% | 7,823 | +2,354 | +30.09% |
| 12th | **Oliver E. Young*** | 9,039 | 62.92% | A. U. Hollis | 5,327 | 37.08% | — | — | — | 14,366 | +3,712 | +25.84% |
| 13th | **James A. Simpson*** | 24,460 | 61.90% | Ben F. Ray | 15,058 | 38.10% | — | — | — | 39,518 | +9,402 | +23.79% |
| 14th | **Verdo Elmore** | 1,657 | 41.08% | **L. W. Wooten** | **1,443** | **35.77%** | E. P. Windham | 934 | 23.15% | 4,034 | +214 | +5.30% |
| 15th | **Karl C. Harrison** | 3,059 | 39.83% | **J. F. McGraw** | **2,171** | **28.26%** | J. A. Hines | 2,451 | 31.91% | 7,681 | +888 | +11.56% |
| 17th | **Joe N. Poole*** | 6,342 | 70.22% | J. W. Joyner | 2,690 | 29.78% | — | — | — | 9,032 | +3,652 | +40.43% |
| 18th | **Howard Cooper*** | 2,690 | 55.65% | John S. Ward | 2,144 | 44.35% | — | — | — | 4,834 | +546 | +11.29% |
| 19th | **P. F. DeVane*** | 5,104 | 54.23% | O. B. Christopher | 4,307 | 45.77% | — | — | — | 9,411 | +797 | +8.47% |
| 20th | **O. D. Carlton*** | 1,820 | 56.89% | S. W. Compton | 1,379 | 43.11% | — | — | — | 3,199 | +441 | +13.79% |
| 21st | **W. C. Holmes** | 4,455 | 45.18% | **W. C. Mason** | **3,301** | **33.48%** | A. B. McPhaul | 2,105 | 21.35% | 9,861 | +1,154 | +11.70% |
| 23rd | **T. S. Faulk*** | 3,872 | 51.05% | Joel E. Johnson | 3,713 | 48.95% | — | — | — | 7,585 | +159 | +2.10% |
| 24th | **Preston C. Clayton*** | 1,962 | 59.91% | Millard I. Jackson | 1,313 | 40.09% | — | — | — | 3,275 | +649 | +19.82% |
| 26th | **Watkins C. Johnston*** | 1,643 | 51.85% | R. H. Powell | 1,526 | 48.15% | — | — | — | 3,169 | +117 | +3.69% |
| 27th | **W. A. Dozier*** | 3,305 | 58.10% | T. W. Britton | 2,383 | 41.90% | — | — | — | 5,688 | +922 | +16.21% |
| 28th | **Charles A. Stakely*** | 10,154 | 78.02% | Charles B. Teasley | 2,860 | 21.98% | — | — | — | 13,014 | +7,294 | +56.05% |
| 29th | **E. M. Baker** | 4,062 | 49.28% | **Lewis W. Fowler** | **2,556** | **31.01%** | W. B. Thompson | 1,624 | 19.70% | 8,242 | +1,506 | +18.27% |
| 31st | **Zadoc L. Weatherford*** | 5,717 | 55.22% | M. D. Hansbrough | 2,563 | 24.75% | Charles G. Richeson | 2,074 | 20.03% | 10,354 | +3,154 | +30.46% |
| 32nd | **E. F. Hildreth*** | 1,623 | 50.37% | D. G. Mayes | 1,599 | 49.63% | — | — | — | 3,222 | +24 | +0.74% |
| 33rd | **Daniel T. McCall*** | 9,167 | 65.97% | Alfred L. Staples | 4,728 | 34.03% | — | — | — | 13,895 | +4,439 | +31.95% |
| 34th | **A. L. Crumpton*** | 3,329 | 50.45% | O. O. Mitchell | 3,269 | 49.55% | — | — | — | 6,598 | +60 | +0.91% |
| 35th | **W. Perry Calhoun*** | 4,804 | 62.69% | N. Frank Pridgen | 2,859 | 37.31% | — | — | — | 7,663 | +1,945 | +25.38% |
Source: Alabama Official and Statistical Register, 1939 (p. 650–655)

=== Nominated unopposed ===
The following candidates won the Democratic nomination by default as they were the only to run in their respective district:

- District 2: Norman W. Harris received 6,776 votes.
- District 16: Renzo Guy received 1,287 votes.
- District 22: J. M. Bonner received 1,657 votes.
- District 25: J. M. Rowe received 7,783 votes.
- District 30: C. C. Thomas received 3,383 votes.

== 1935–1938 special elections ==
=== District 25 (Coffee–Crenshaw–Pike) ===
A special election in Senate District 25 (Coffee–Crenshaw–Pike) was made necessary by the death of incumbent senator Thomas J. Thrower on July 12, 1935. W. H. Stoddard of Crenshaw County won the Democratic nomination unopposed, and did not face opposition at the September 11, 1935 general special election.

=== District 14 (Pickens–Sumter) ===
A special election in Senate District 4 (Madison County) was made necessary by the death of incumbent senator John A. Rogers on September 22, 1936. Marcus E. McConnell won the Democratic nomination unanimously and did not face opposition at the November 3, 1936 general special election.

=== District 4 (Madison County) ===
A special election in Senate District 4 (Madison County) was made necessary by the death of incumbent senator Shelby S. Fletcher on July 1, 1936. Attorney Schuyler H. Richardson won the Democratic nomination unanimously and did not face opposition at the November 3, 1936 general special election. Richardson was later appointed judge of the 23rd Judicial Circuit on December 10, 1937.

1936 Alabama Senate District 4 special general election November 3, 1936
| Party | Candidate | Votes | % |
|---|---|---|---|
| Democratic | Schuyler H. Richardson | 4,542 | 99.28% |
| Write-in | Charles D. Lane | 33 | 0.72% |
| Total votes | | 4,575 | 100.00% |

== See also ==
- Category:1938 elections in Alabama
  - 1938 Alabama's 2nd congressional district special election
  - 1938 United States House of Representatives elections in Alabama
  - 1938 Alabama gubernatorial election
- 1938 United States elections
