= 1942 Alabama House of Representatives election =

- November 3, 1942

All 106 seats in the Alabama House of Representatives 54 seats needed for a majority
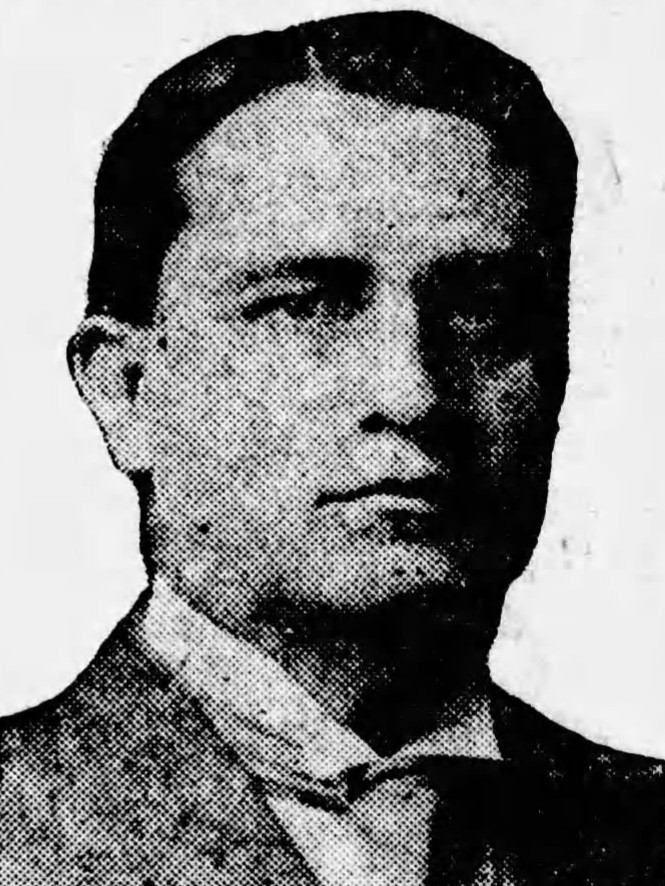

	Majority party	Minority party
Leader	Hugh D. Merrill	Percy M. Pitts (did not stand)
Party	Democratic	Republican
Leader since	January 10, 1939	January 10, 1939
Leader's seat	Calhoun Co.	Chilton Co.
Last election	105 seats, 92.85%	1 seat, 7.14%
Seats won	105	1
Seat change	Steady	Steady
Popular vote	160,400	4,114
Percentage	97.50%	2.50%
- Democratic gain Democratic hold Republican gain Democratic: 60–70% 70–80% 80–90% Unopposed; Republican: 60–70%
Speaker before election
Hugh D. Merrill
Democratic
Elected Speaker
George O. Miller
Democratic

The 1942 Alabama House of Representatives election took place on Tuesday, November 3, 1942, to elect 106 representatives to serve four-year terms in the Alabama House of Representatives. 105 of 106 candidates elected were members of the Democratic Party, with one Republican (Frank Minis Johnson) elected. The election used nearly the same seat apportionment first established by the Alabama Constitution of 1901.

As the Democratic Party was dominant in the state, state legislative seats were generally decided at the Democratic primary election. The first round of the Democratic primary was held on May 7 with runoff elections on June 4. On November 16, 1942, representative George O. Miller of Sumter County was unanimously elected Speaker of the House.

The election took place concurrently with elections for U.S. Senate, U.S. House, governor, state senate, and numerous other state and local offices.

== General election results ==
=== Party gains ===
Source for 1938 election winners: Alabama Official and Statistical Register, 1939.

- Chilton: Democrat G. C. Walker was elected. Republican Percy M. Pitts won this seat in 1938. Democratic gain.
- Winston: Republican Frank Minis Johnson was elected. Democrat Roy Mayhall won this seat in 1938. Republican gain.

=== By district ===
District	Democratic			Republican			Total		
District	Candidate	Votes	%	Candidate	Votes	%	Votes	Maj.	Mrg.
Chilton	G. C. Walker	2,532	65.04%	T. E. Wyatt	1,361	34.96%	3,893	+1,171	+30.08%
Franklin	William Still	1,599	80.64%	T. L. Pounders	384	19.36%	1,983	+1,215	+61.27%
Shelby	Frank Head	1,430	84.62%	S. M. Harney	260	15.38%	1,690	+1,170	+69.23%
St. Clair	W. J. Hodges	1,810	75.57%	C. R. Robinson	585	24.43%	2,395	+1,225	+51.15%
Winston	James M. Howell	760	33.27%	Frank Minis Johnson	1,524	66.73%	2,284	−764	−33.45%
Source: Alabama Official and Statistical Register, 1943. (p. 802–805)

== See also ==
- Category:1942 elections in Alabama
  - 1942 United States Senate election in Alabama
  - 1942 United States House of Representatives elections in Alabama
  - 1942 Alabama gubernatorial election
  - 1942 Alabama Senate election
- 1942 United States elections
