= Governor Dixon =

Governor Dixon may refer to:

- Frank M. Dixon (1892–1965), 40th Governor of Alabama
- Joseph M. Dixon (1867–1934), 7th Governor of Montana
