= 1938 Alabama House of Representatives election =

- November 8, 1938

All 106 seats in the Alabama House of Representatives 54 seats needed for a majority
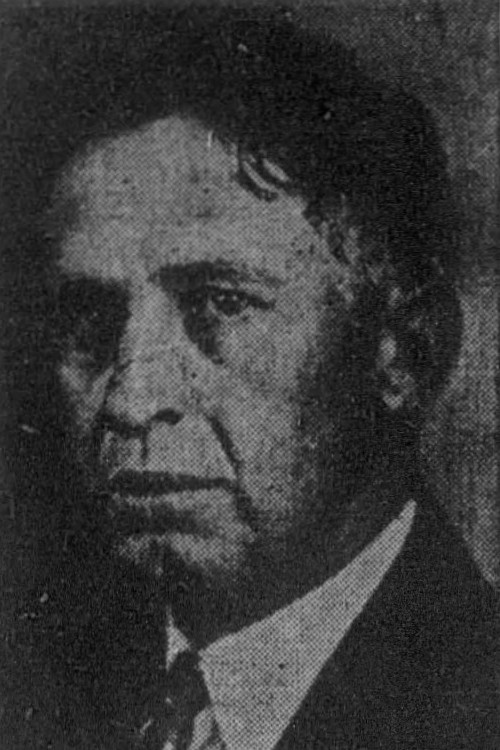

	Majority party	Minority party
Leader	Robert H. Walker	—
Party	Democratic	Republican
Leader since	January 13, 1931	—
Leader's seat	Limestone Co.	—
Last election	104 seats, 93.98%	1 seats, 6.02%
Seats won	105	1
Seat change	▲1	▼1
Popular vote	250,084	19,241
Percentage	92.85%	7.14%
- Democratic gain Democratic hold Republican gain Democratic: 50–60% 60–70% 70–80% 80–90% 90–100% Unopposed; Republican: 50–60%
Speaker before election
Robert H. Walker
Democratic
Elected Speaker
Hugh D. Merrill
Democratic

The 1938 Alabama House of Representatives election took place on Tuesday, November 8, 1938, to elect 106 representatives to serve four-year terms in the Alabama House of Representatives. 105 Democrats and one Republican, Percy M. Pitts of Chilton County, were elected to the 1939 House.

Representative Hugh D. Merrill of Calhoun County was unanimously elected for a second stint as Speaker of the House on January 10, 1939.

== General election results ==
=== Party gains ===
Source for 1934 election winners: Alabama Official and Statistical Register, 1935.

- Chilton: Republican Percy M. Pitts was elected. Democrat C. B. Cox won this seat in 1934. Republican gain.
- Winston: Democrat Roy Mayhall was elected. He defeated incumbent Republican J. A. Posey, first elected in 1934. Democratic gain.

=== By district ===
District	Democratic			Republican			Total		
District	Candidate	Votes	%	Candidate	Votes	%	Votes	Maj.	Mrg.
Chilton	G. C. Walker	2,152	49.34%	Percy M. Pitts	2,210	50.66%	4,362	−58	−1.33%
Cleburne	Grady W. Cook	1,393	58.75%	Lee Haywood	978	41.25%	2,371	+415	+17.50%
Cullman	M. L. Robertson (inc.)	3,307	56.55%	Henry F. Arnold	2,541	43.45%	5,848	+766	+13.10%
DeKalb	W. M. Beck	5,256	65.76%	Frank Hixon	2,737	34.24%	7,993	+2,519	+31.52%
Etowah p. 1	James B. Allen	3,637	86.16%	Bernard Thompson	584	13.84%	4,221	+3,053	+72.33%
Etowah p. 2	Roy D. McCord	3,656	85.80%	Charles M. Williams	605	14.20%	4,261	+3,051	+71.60%
Franklin	Frank L. Haynes	2,604	62.58%	W. H. Hudson	1,557	37.42%	4,161	+1,047	+25.16%
Shelby	L. H. Ellis	2,258	72.44%	Mark Sims	859	27.56%	3,117	+1,399	+44.88%
St. Clair	John R. Robinson	2,147	71.83%	Mack Davis	842	28.17%	2,989	+1,305	+43.66%
Winston	Roy Mayhall	1,793	55.91%	J. A. Posey (inc.)	1,414	44.09%	3,207	+379	+11.82%
Source: Alabama Official and Statistical Register, 1939. (p. 708–710)

=== Jefferson County (at-large) ===
Unlike other multi-seat counties, candidates in Jefferson County ran an at-large basis rather than for designated places.

Jefferson County election (7 to be elected)
Party	Candidate	Votes	%
Democratic	Sidney W. Smyer	12,747	94.91%
Democratic	Mark Hodo	12,735	94.83%
Democratic	W. S. Welch	12,729	94.78%
Democratic	Hugh Kaul	12,732	94.80%
Democratic	Roger Snyder	12,719	94.71%
Democratic	Ivy J. Gwin	12,717	94.69%
Democratic	Tram Sessions	12,717	94.69%
Republican	A. P. Longshore Jr.	711	5.29%
Republican	U. S. Holliman	708	5.27%
Republican	C. O. Vardaman	704	5.24%
Republican	Frank Hurst	700	5.21%
Republican	H. H. Grooms	698	5.20%
Republican	Grady Miller	697	5.19%
Republican	C. A. Wiegand	696	5.18%
Total votes		94,010	100.00%

== See also ==
- Category:1938 elections in Alabama
  - 1938 United States House of Representatives elections in Alabama
  - 1938 Alabama gubernatorial election
  - 1938 Alabama Senate election
- 1938 United States elections
