= Dennis Powell =

American baseball player (born 1963)

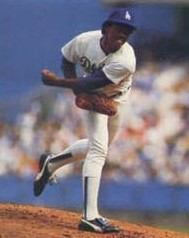
- Powell in 1986
- Pitcher
- Born: August 13, 1963 (age 62); Moultrie, Georgia, U.S.
- Batted: Right Threw: Left

Professional debut
- MLB: July 7, 1985, for the Los Angeles Dodgers
- NPB: April 2, 1995, for the Kintetsu Buffaloes

Last appearance
- MLB: August 11, 1993, for the Seattle Mariners
- NPB: October 6, 1995, for the Kintetsu Buffaloes

MLB statistics
- Win–loss record: 11–22
- Earned run average: 4.95
- Strikeouts: 199

NPB statistics
- Win–loss record: 2–7
- Earned run average: 3.67
- Strikeouts: 54
- Stats at Baseball Reference

Teams
- Los Angeles Dodgers (1985–1986); Seattle Mariners (1987–1990); Milwaukee Brewers (1990); Seattle Mariners (1992–1993); Kintetsu Buffaloes (1995)

Dennis Clay Powell (born August 13, 1963) is an American former professional baseball pitcher who played in Major League Baseball for the Los Angeles Dodgers, Seattle Mariners, and Milwaukee Brewers, in all or parts of eight seasons (1985–1993). Powell also pitched for the Kintetsu Buffaloes of Nippon Professional Baseball in 1995.

Powell was undrafted and unrecruited out of Colquitt County High School and, after graduating, got a job on an ice truck to help support his mother and three brothers while playing semi-pro baseball in Albany, Georgia, where he won 20 consecutive games. It was not until his second season that he attracted the attention of scouts and was given a signing bonus of $3,000 to join the Los Angeles Dodgers (equivalent to $9,700 in 2025); he had been making $150 per week on the ice truck (equivalent to $485 in 2025). He led the Gulf Coast League in strikeouts and shutouts in 1983.

Powell made his MLB debut in 1985. He had surgery to remove bone chips from his elbow in May 1986. The Dodgers traded him and Mike Watters to Seattle for pitcher Matt Young after the season. In his first stint with the Mariners, he split time between the majors and minors and was released in May 1990, quickly signing a minor league contract with the Brewers. He signed with the Baltimore Orioles before the 1991 season but was released after spring training and returned to the Mariners organization, though he did not return to the majors until 1992.

As a big league hitter, Powell had three hits, all doubles, in 17 at bats (since he played mostly in the American League, during the designated hitter era), for a .176 batting average. Powell’s three doubles ties him with Earl Hersh and Verdo Elmore for the most hits in a major league career in which all the player’s hits were doubles.

== Personal life ==
One of Powell's brothers and a nephew died in a car accident in April 1989 in Georgia. Two other brothers died in a car accident only a few months later in January 1990 on U.S. Route 319 in Georgia.

Powell is married and has a child.
