= Earl Hersh =

American baseball player (1932-2013)

- Left fielder
- Born: May 21, 1932; Ebbvale, Maryland, U.S.
- Died: March 18, 2013 (aged 80); Hanover, Pennsylvania, U.S.
- Batted: Left Threw: Left

MLB debut
- September 4, 1956, for the Milwaukee Braves

Last MLB appearance
- September 22, 1956, for the Milwaukee Braves

MLB statistics
- At bats: 13
- Runs batted in: 0
- Home runs: 0
- Batting average: .231
- Stats at Baseball Reference

Teams
- Milwaukee Braves (1956)

Earl Walter Hersh (May 21, 1932 – March 18, 2013), was an American professional baseball outfielder, who played seven games in Major League Baseball (MLB), for the Milwaukee Braves, during the 1956 season. He was originally signed by the Braves, as an amateur free agent, prior to the 1953 season. Hersh also played in the Puerto Rico Baseball League.

Hersh graduated from West Chester Teachers College in 1953. He was inducted into that institution's Athletic Hall of Fame. A two-sport athlete, Hersh was recognized separately, in both football (1982), and baseball (1992). An end, he was also drafted by the National Football League (NFL) Philadelphia Eagles, in the 27th round of the 1953 NFL draft, but elected to play baseball professionally.

In 1958, Hersh won the American Association RBI title, while playing for the Wichita Braves. On May 28, 1959, he was traded to the Detroit Tigers as part of a four-player deal, but was returned to the Braves system when another player involved in the trade refused to report to his new team.

A curious fact is that all three of Hersh's big league hits were doubles, which ties him with Verdo Elmore and Dennis Powell for the most hits in an MLB career, where all of the player's hits were two-baggers.

Hersh was born in Ebbvale, Maryland. He spent most of his adult life in the field of education, serving as an educator, administrator, and coach, retiring in 1992. Hersh died in Hanover, Pennsylvania, on March 18, 2013.
