= 1942 Alabama gubernatorial election =

- November 3, 1942
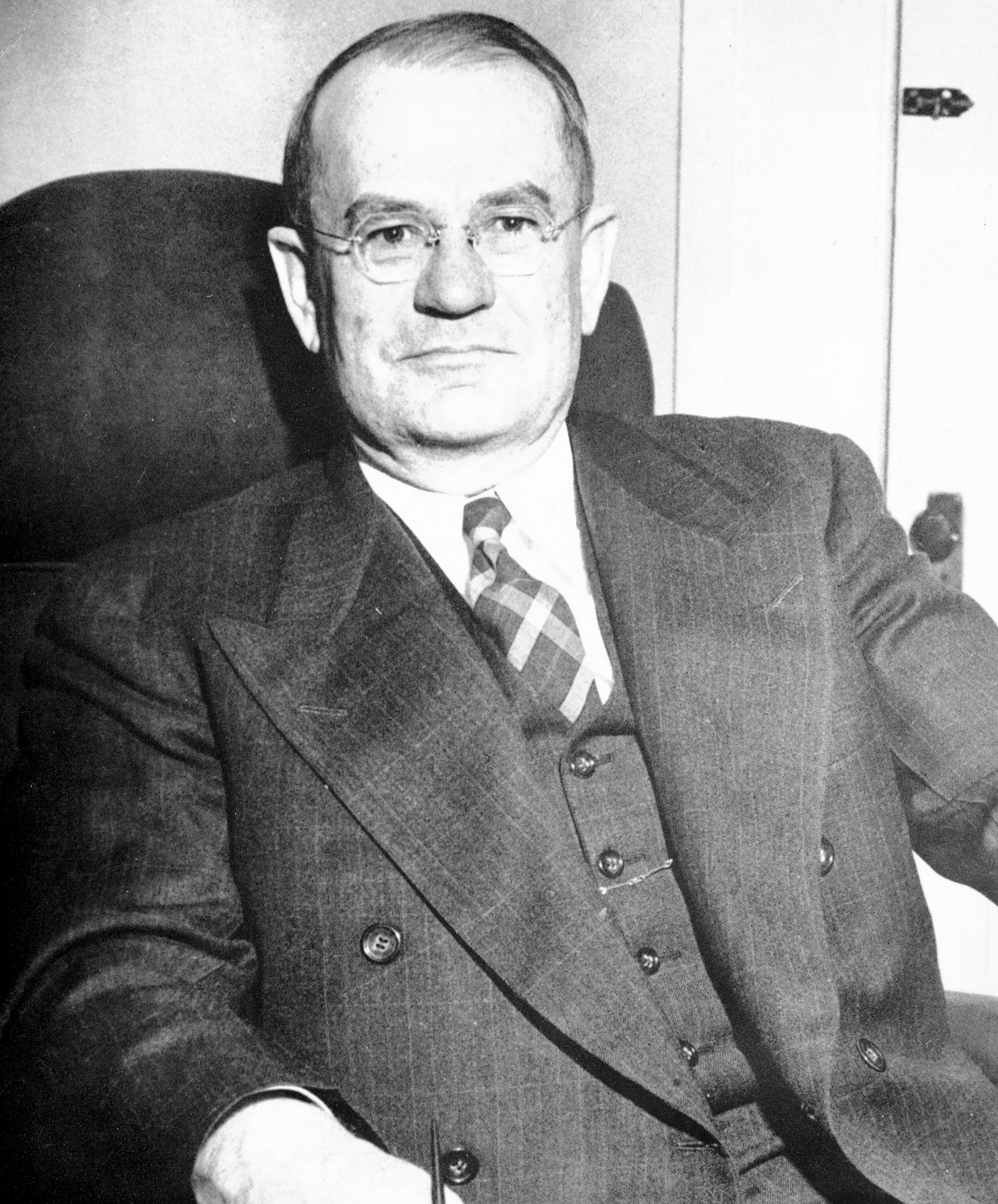

Nominee	Chauncey Sparks	Hugh McEniry
Party	Democratic	Republican
Popular vote	69,048	8,167
Percentage	88.96%	10.52%
- County results Sparks: 60–70% 70–80% 80–90% >90% McEniry: 50–60%
Governor before election
Frank M. Dixon
Democratic
Elected Governor
Chauncey Sparks
Democratic

The 1942 Alabama gubernatorial election took place on November 3, 1942, to elect the governor of Alabama. Incumbent Democrat Frank M. Dixon was term limited, and could not seek a second consecutive term.

== Democratic primary ==
At the time this election took place, Alabama, as with most other southern states, was solidly Democratic, and the Republican Party had such diminished influence that the Democratic primary was the de facto contest for state offices.

=== Candidates ===
- W. O. Broyle
- H. J. Carwile
- Jim Folsom, businessman
- Christopher J. Sherlock
- Chauncey Sparks, former State Representative and candidate for governor in 1938

=== Results ===
1942 Alabama Democratic gubernatorial primary
Party	Candidate	Votes	%
Democratic	Chauncey Sparks	145,798	52.17
Democratic	Jim Folsom	73,306	26.23
Democratic	Christopher J. Sherlock	53,448	19.13
Democratic	H. J. Carwile	4,745	1.70
Democratic	W. O. Broyle	2,157	0.77
Total votes		279,454	100.00

== Results ==
1942 Alabama gubernatorial election
Party	Candidate	Votes	%
Democratic	Chauncey Sparks	69,048	88.96
Republican	Hugh McEniry	8,167	10.52
Communist	Ordway Southard	402	0.52
Total votes		77,617	100.00
Democratic hold			
