= Verdo Elmore =

American baseball player

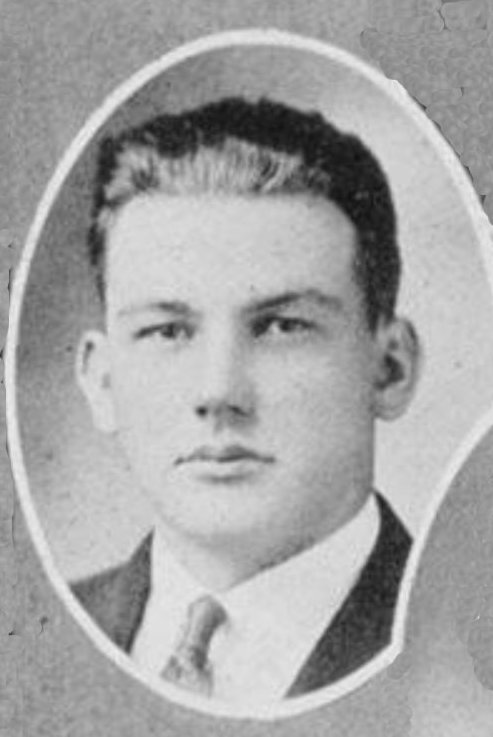
- Outfielder
- Born: December 10, 1899; Gordo, Alabama, U.S.
- Died: August 5, 1969 (aged 69); Birmingham, Alabama, U.S.
- Batted: Left Threw: Right

MLB debut
- September 11, 1924, for the St. Louis Browns

Last MLB appearance
- September 24, 1924, for the St. Louis Browns

MLB statistics
- Batting average: .176
- Home runs: 0
- Runs batted in: 0
- Stats at Baseball Reference

Teams
- St. Louis Browns (1924)

Verdo Wilson "Ellie" Elmore (December 10, 1899 – August 5, 1969) was an American professional baseball outfielder, who played in Major League Baseball (MLB). Elmore played for the St. Louis Browns, in 1924.

All three of Elmore’s big league hits were doubles, which ties him with Earl Hersh and Dennis Powell for the most hits in an MLB career, where all of the player’s hits were two-baggers.
