= 1938 Alabama gubernatorial election =

- November 8, 1938
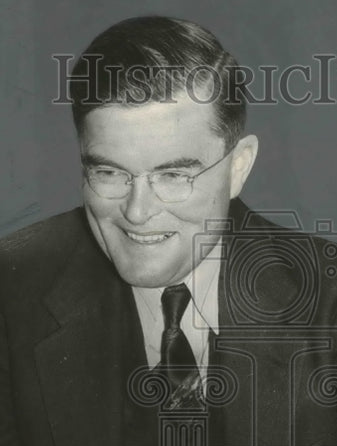

Nominee	Frank M. Dixon	W. A. Clardy
Party	Democratic	Republican
Popular vote	115,761	16,513
Percentage	87.52%	12.48%
- County results Dixon: 50–60% 60–70% 70–80% 80–90% >90%
Governor before election
Bibb Graves
Democratic
Elected Governor
Frank M. Dixon
Democratic

The 1938 Alabama gubernatorial election took place on November 8, 1938, to elect the governor of Alabama. Democratic incumbent Bibb Graves was term-limited, and could not seek a second consecutive term.

== Democratic primary ==
At the time this election took place, Alabama, as with most other southern states, was solidly Democratic, and the Republican Party had such diminished influence that the Democratic primary was the de facto contest for state offices; after winning the Democratic primary it was a given you would win the general election.

=== Candidates ===
- James H. Arnold
- Frank M. Dixon, attorney and candidate for governor in 1934
- R. J. Goode, Commissioner of Agriculture and Industries
- D. Hardy Riddle
- Chauncey Sparks, State Representative

=== Results ===
1938 Alabama Democratic gubernatorial primary
Party	Candidate	Votes	%
Democratic	Frank M. Dixon	152,860	48.62
Democratic	Chauncey Sparks	74,544	23.71
Democratic	R. J. Goode	70,287	22.36
Democratic	D. Hardy Riddle	15,478	4.92
Democratic	James H. Arnold	1,201	0.38
Total votes		314,370	100

== Results ==
1938 Alabama gubernatorial election
Party	Candidate	Votes	%
Democratic	Frank M. Dixon	115,761	87.52
Republican	W. A. Clardy	16,513	12.48
Total votes		132,274	100.00
Democratic hold			
