= Frank M. Dixon =

American politician (1892–1965)

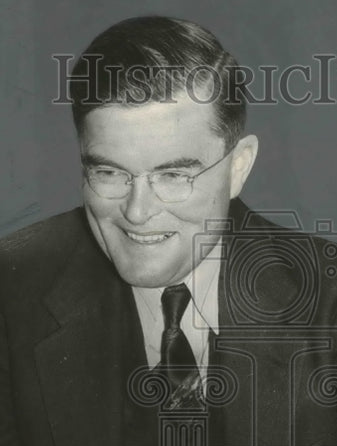
- Official portrait, 1939

40th Governor of Alabama
- In office January 17, 1939 – January 19, 1943
- Lieutenant: Albert A. Carmichael
- Preceded by: Bibb Graves
- Succeeded by: Chauncey Sparks

Personal details
- Born: Frank Murray Dixon; July 25, 1892 Oakland, California, U.S.
- Died: October 11, 1965 (aged 73) Birmingham, Alabama, U.S.
- Resting place: Oak Hill Cemetery
- Party: Democratic
- Spouse: Juliet Perry
- Occupation: Lawyer

Military service
- Allegiance: Canada
- Branch/service: Royal Canadian Air Force
- Rank: Major
- Battles/wars: World War I

Frank Murray Dixon (July 25, 1892 – October 11, 1965) was an American politician. A member of the Democratic Party, he served as the 40th governor of Alabama from 1939 to 1943 and is most known for reorganizing the state government and reforming the way property taxes were assessed.

== Early life ==
Dixon was born in Oakland, California to Reverend Frank Dixon and Laura Dixon. Dixon spent the majority of his youth in Virginia and attended public schools in both Virginia and Washington, DC. He graduated from Phillips Exeter Preparatory School (Phillips Exeter Academy) and then went on to graduate from Columbia University. In 1916 he obtained his law degree from the University of Virginia. He began his law career in Birmingham, Alabama in the law firm of Captain Francis S. White. Soon after, he married Juliet Perry, with whom he had a son and a daughter.

His law practice was interrupted by World War I. Dixon enlisted in the Coast Artillery Corps as a volunteer. As a second lieutenant, Dixon was assigned to the French escadrille as an aerial observer and machine gunner. In July 1918, he was wounded when his plane was shot down over Soissons, France, which in turn required his leg to be amputated. Dixon was awarded the Croix de Guerre with Palm by the French government; the French government also named him chevalier of the French Legion of Honor and promoted him to major.

When he returned to Birmingham, he founded a law partnership, Bowers and Dixon, and became a successful corporate lawyer. At that point, he became a commander of the American Legion and was active in veterans' causes. In 1934 Dixon made his first attempt at the governorship of Alabama but lost the Democratic primary to Bibb Graves. However, in 1938 he easily defeated his opponent and succeeded Graves as the Governor of Alabama.

== Governor of Alabama ==
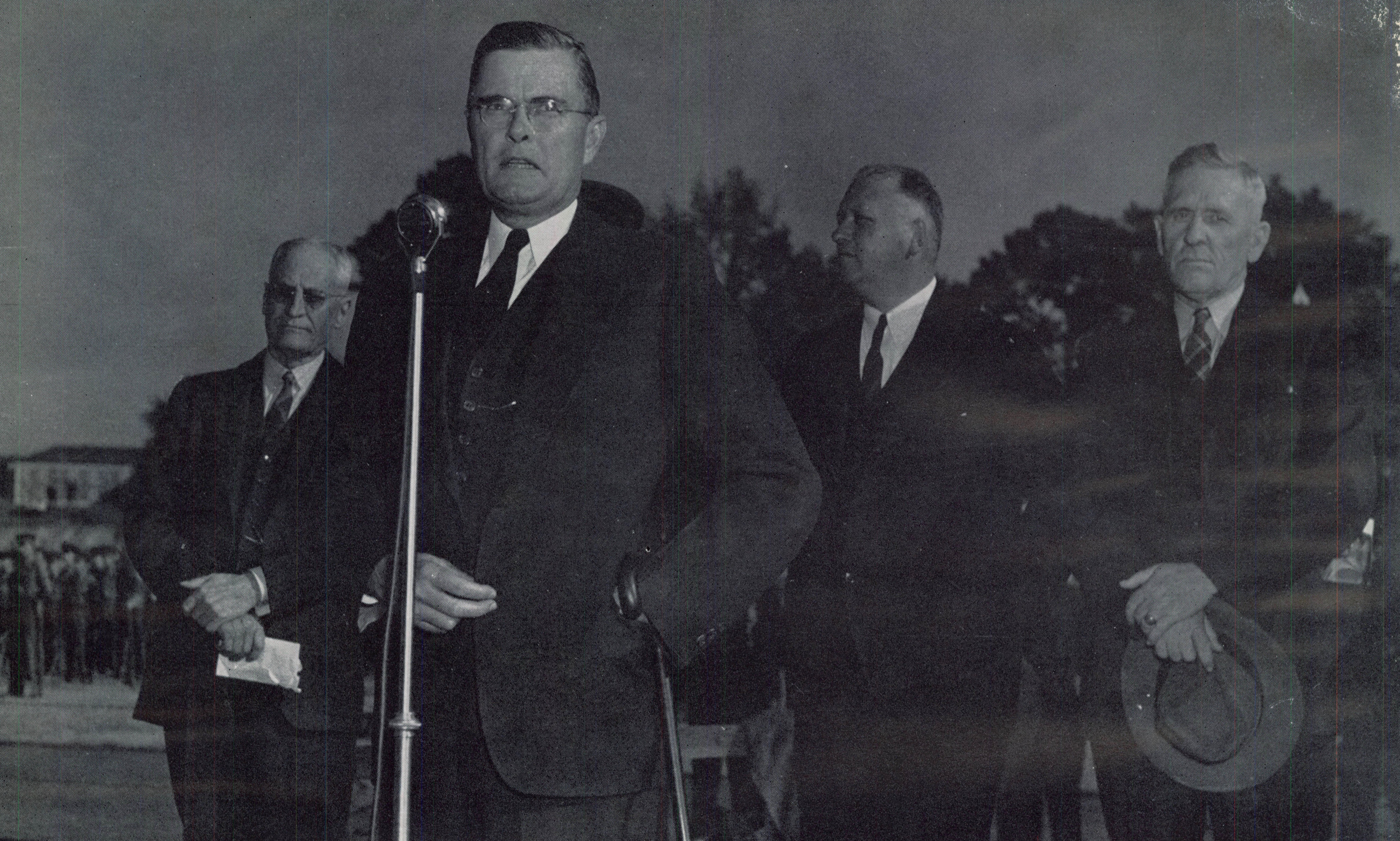
Dixon (center) speaking at Auburn University in 1942

Before his inauguration, Dixon spent extensive time preparing for his term. He met with Bibb Graves, public administration experts, and Franklin Roosevelt to get advice and expertise on his plans for changing Alabama's government. As governor, Dixon strove to streamline the state government. He eliminated twenty-seven government agencies in the state by consolidating duties within the departments. The agencies that initially were under the leadership of committees were placed under the authority of one individual who reported directly to the governor. He, therefore, also centralized power in the office of the governor. He terminated the employment of every state employee added to the payroll after the date of his inauguration. He ordered every employee that did not have specific duties to be terminated as well. He pushed through a teachers' retirement system and a teacher tenure law. He also established a state civil service system that required hiring state employees based on a merit system.

Dixon spent much time reforming the property tax assessment method in the state. Dixon believed that the property tax review boards assigned by the county deliberately under-assessed property taxes. This, in turn, led to inadequately supported school districts and municipal services. He pushed through his reform bill that required local assessment boards to be replaced by a three-person board appointed by the governor.

As World War II began at the end of his term, Dixon's accomplishments only increased. He oversaw a wartime reorganization of the docks in Mobile, Alabama, resulting in a four-hundred percent increase in barge traffic. Alabama's economy flourished with the shipbuilding and repairing industry brought about by the war. During World War II, Dixon oversaw some war-related events as governor. British soldiers trained in the United States as part of lend-lease; sometimes, those soldiers died in Alabama. Due to the British Army's policy of British soldiers being buried in the land where they died, Maddox set up special areas for British pilots who died in Alabama at The Oakwood Cemetery Annex; they were "given a place of their own over which flew the Union Jack." The graves were maintained by Montgomery women who were members of the Federated Garden Clubs. Dixon organized a very large Armistice Day parade on November 11, 1941. Seven thousand people marched in the parade, with members from every branch of the American armed forces, including Lanier Band, Alabama State band, and the Maxwell band, as well as 3,000 U.S. Army Air Corps flying cadets and several hundred British RAF cadets. The Montgomery Advertiser commented that even though thousands lined the parade route, most people did not cheer but rather were calm, respectful, and quiet observers until the British cadets came by. At that point, the crowd did cheer, "...the British cadets alone waking applause from the onlookers." Governor Dixon also organized and oversaw a "massive" USO show in Montgomery that featured Erle Danley, a music professor from Huntingdon, a choir from Alabama State sang carols, British cadets singing "God Rest Ye Merry, Gentlemen" as well as other events.

== Post gubernatorial years ==
After Dixon left office in 1943, he returned to his corporate law practice and began a private firm called Bowers, Dixon, Dunn, and McDowell in Birmingham. He was a lobbyist for conservative causes in the state legislature. He spent much of his time lobbying for the right-to-work law. In 1948, former governor Dixon was temporary chairman and keynote speaker at the Birmingham convention of the States' Rights Democratic Party that nominated Strom Thurmond and Fielding Wright as their presidential ticket. In the 1960 United States presidential election, Dixon was the highest vote-getter for a slate of unpledged Democratic electors that chose Harry F. Byrd and Strom Thurmond over John F. Kennedy and Lyndon B. Johnson. Dixon died in Birmingham on October 11, 1965.

Party political offices
Preceded by Bibb Graves	Democratic nominee for Governor of Alabama; 1938	Succeeded by Chauncey Sparks
Political offices
Preceded by Bibb Graves	Governor of Alabama; 1939–1943	Succeeded by Chauncey Sparks
