= Alabama Constitution of 1901 =

Principles, institutions and law of political governance in the U.S. state of Alabama

Constitution of the State of Alabama
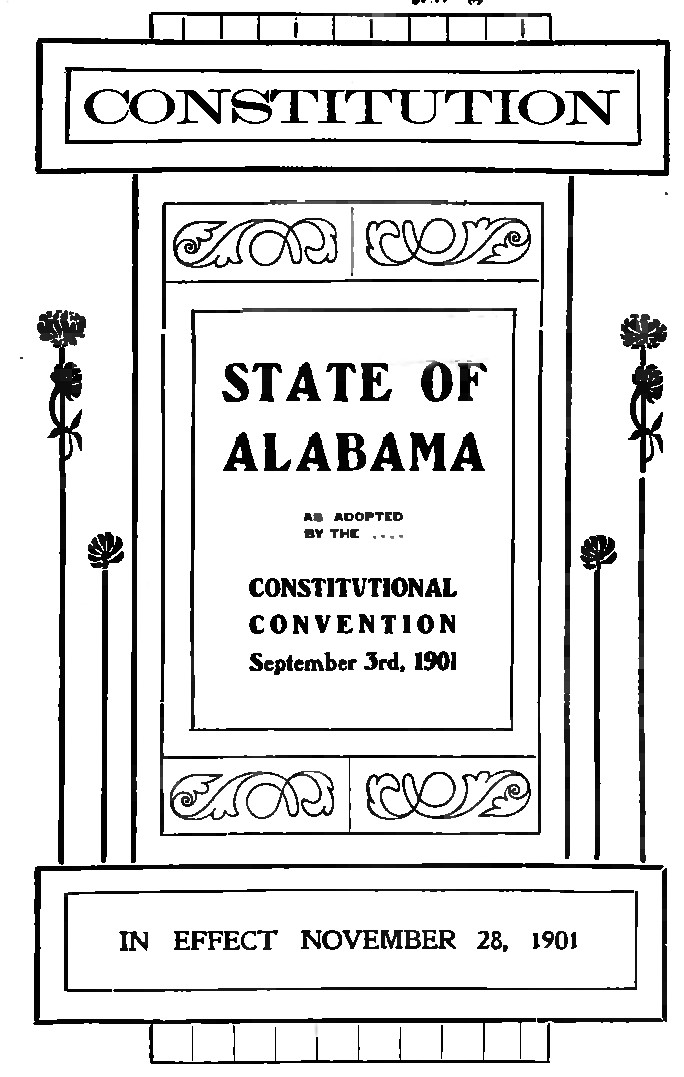

Overview
- Jurisdiction: Alabama, United States
- Ratified: 21 November 1901; 124 years ago
- Date effective: 28 November 1901; 124 years ago

History
- Repealed: 28 November 2022; 3 years ago
- Amendments: 977
- Signatories: see Constitution, source pages 61-62

Full text
- Alabama State Constitution of 1901 at Wikisource

The Constitution of the State of Alabama of 1901 was the basic governing document of the U.S. state of Alabama. Adopted in 1901, it was Alabama's sixth constitution.

At 388,882 words, the document was 12 times longer than the average state constitution, 51 times longer than the U.S. Constitution, and, at the time of its repeal, the longest and most amended constitution operative anywhere in the world. The English version of the Constitution of India, the longest national constitution in the world, is about 145,000 words long, less than 40% of the length of Alabama's (was formerly about one-third, with both expanding over time).

By the time of its renaming, about 90 percent of the document's length was made up of 977 separate amendments (for comparison, the 106 amendments to the Constitution of India form none of the latter's text, as they modify the main body's wording directly rather than being appended to it). About 75 percent of the amendments covered individual counties or cities, and some were so detailed as to deal with salaries of specific officials (e.g. Amendment 480 pertaining to the Greene County probate judge). As a result, Alabama had a very high number of constitutional officers. The constitution made it very difficult for residents of most counties to solve their own problems as the limited home rule required them to ask the state legislature to make amendments to the constitution or pass special legislation in order to carry out desired activities.

The Constitutional Convention was called with the intention by southern Democrats of the state "within the limits imposed by the Federal Constitution, to establish white supremacy in this State". Its provisions essentially disenfranchised most African Americans and thousands of poor White Americans, who were excluded from voting until the Voting Rights Act of 1965. The constitution also gave the Alabama Legislature the power to administer most counties directly, with only a few counties having even limited home rule, further entrenching disfranchisement by limiting local autonomy.

The Preamble says:

We the people of the State of Alabama, in order to establish justice, insure domestic tranquility, and secure the blessings of liberty to ourselves and our posterity, invoking the favor and guidance of Almighty God, do ordain and establish the following Constitution and form of government for the State of Alabama.

== History ==
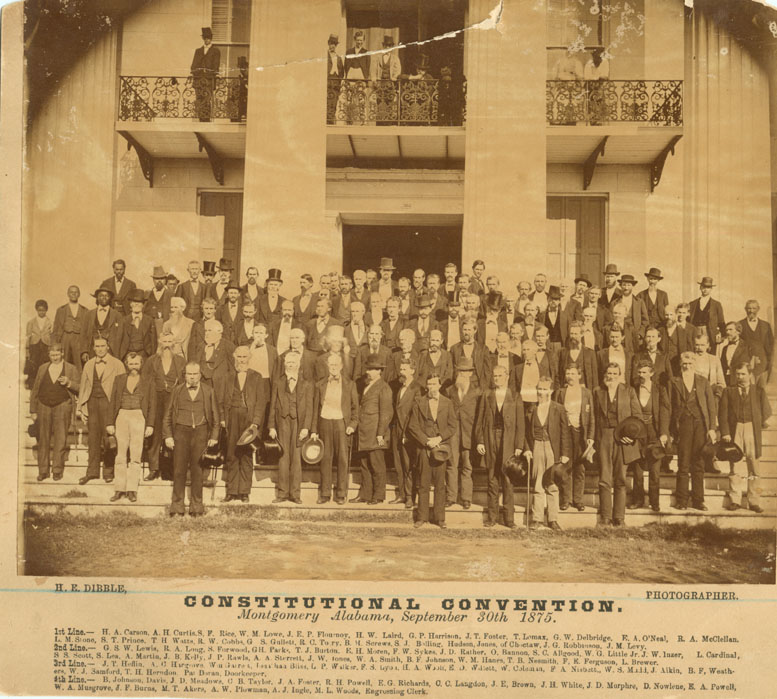
Delegates at the 1875 Alabama Constitutional Convention

Prior to the 2022 constitution, Alabama has had six constitutions, all established via State Conventions: 1819 (converting Alabama Territory into a State), 1861 (Secession), 1865 (Reconstruction), 1868 (Reconstruction), 1875 (ending Reconstruction), and the 1901 document.

The referendum calling for the constitutional convention passed with the aid of widespread electoral fraud in the Black Belt. In 2020, columnist Bill Ivey called the result "one of the most consequential voter fraud incidents in U.S. history" due to the substantial long-term impact the Constitution has had.

=== Vote on ratifying the Constitution ===
November 11, 1901 vote on ratification by county
County	For Constitution		Against Constitution		Margin		Total
County	#	%	#	%	#	%	Total
Autauga	905	49.59%	920	50.41%	−15	−0.82%	1,825
Baldwin	508	55.10%	414	44.90%	94	10.20%	922
Barbour	2,905	72.16%	1,121	27.84%	1,784	44.31%	4,026
Bibb	1,210	53.68%	1,044	46.32%	166	7.36%	2,254
Blount	795	31.97%	1,692	68.03%	−897	−36.07%	2,487
Bullock	962	63.21%	560	36.79%	402	26.41%	1,522
Butler	1,058	38.29%	1,705	61.71%	−647	−23.42%	2,763
Calhoun	2,546	56.89%	1,929	43.11%	617	13.79%	4,475
Chambers	4,604	89.28%	553	10.72%	4,051	78.55%	5,157
Cherokee	508	26.05%	1,442	73.95%	−934	−47.90%	1,950
Chilton	394	19.14%	1,664	80.86%	−1,270	−61.71%	2,058
Choctaw	862	46.72%	983	53.28%	−121	−6.56%	1,845
Clarke	1,448	76.53%	444	23.47%	1,004	53.07%	1,892
Clay	683	28.55%	1,709	71.45%	−1,026	−42.89%	2,392
Cleburne	1,459	66.35%	740	33.65%	719	32.70%	2,199
Coffee	778	48.29%	833	51.71%	−55	−3.41%	1,611
Colbert	2,011	72.89%	748	27.11%	1,263	45.78%	2,579
Conecuh	834	41.53%	1,174	58.47%	−340	−16.93%	2,008
Coosa	948	41.16%	1,355	58.84%	−407	−17.67%	2,303
Covington	698	40.56%	1,023	59.44%	−325	−18.88%	1,721
Crenshaw	1,249	59.93%	835	40.07%	414	19.87%	2,084
Cullman	544	23.57%	1,764	76.43%	−1,220	−52.86%	2,308
Dale	753	30.57%	1,710	69.43%	−957	−38.86%	2,463
Dallas	8,125	97.19%	235	2.81%	7,890	94.38%	8,360
DeKalb	812	34.06%	1,572	65.94%	−760	−31.88%	2,384
Elmore	1,757	76.39%	543	23.61%	1,214	52.78%	2,300
Escambia	703	60.97%	450	39.03%	253	21.94%	1,153
Etowah	1,189	35.71%	2,141	64.29%	−952	−28.59%	3,330
Fayette	542	34.46%	1,031	65.54%	−489	−31.09%	1,573
Franklin	528	29.78%	1,245	70.22%	−717	−40.44%	1,773
Geneva	527	33.76%	1,034	66.24%	−507	−32.48%	1,561
Greene	1,077	91.43%	101	8.57%	976	82.85%	1,178
Hale	4,698	98.02%	95	1.98%	4,603	96.04%	4,793
Henry	1,882	54.21%	1,590	45.79%	292	8.41%	3,472
Jackson	633	17.95%	2,893	82.05%	−2,260	−64.10%	3,526
Jefferson	8,088	56.77%	6,160	43.23%	1,928	13.53%	14,248
Lamar	677	49.96%	678	50.04%	−1	−0.07%	1,355
Lauderdale	1,125	35.48%	2,046	64.52%	−921	−29.04%	3,171
Lawrence	1,229	58.50%	872	41.50%	357	16.99%	2,101
Lee	1,174	33.12%	2,371	66.88%	−1,197	−33.77%	3,545
Limestone	2,243	79.34%	584	20.66%	1,659	58.68%	2,827
Lowndes	1,390	45.84%	1,642	54.16%	−252	−8.31%	3,032
Macon	1,073	84.96%	190	15.04%	883	69.91%	1,263
Madison	4,255	65.47%	2,244	34.53%	2,011	30.94%	6,499
Marengo	1,958	85.17%	341	14.83%	1,617	70.33%	2,299
Marion	515	26.74%	1,411	73.26%	−896	−46.52%	1,926
Marshall	401	15.32%	2,217	84.68%	−1,816	−69.37%	2,618
Mobile	1,862	49.93%	1,867	50.07%	−5	−0.13%	3,729
Monroe	1,039	70.16%	442	29.84%	597	40.31%	1,481
Montgomery	4,285	77.78%	1,224	22.22%	3,061	55.56%	5,509
Morgan	1,066	30.50%	2,429	69.50%	−1,363	−39.00%	3,495
Perry	3,209	97.33%	88	2.67%	3,121	94.66%	3,297
Pickens	869	67.57%	417	32.43%	452	35.15%	1,286
Pike	1,627	57.86%	1,185	42.14%	442	15.72%	2,812
Randolph	1,365	51.14%	1,304	48.86%	61	2.29%	2,669
Russell	1,865	74.18%	649	25.82%	1,216	48.37%	2,514
Shelby	587	20.38%	2,293	79.62%	−1,706	−59.24%	2,880
St. Clair	387	19.75%	1,572	80.25%	−1,185	−60.49%	1,959
Sumter	2,930	94.58%	168	5.42%	2,762	89.15%	3,098
Talladega	2,693	66.26%	1,371	33.74%	1,322	32.53%	4,064
Tallapoosa	1,308	32.76%	2,685	67.24%	−1,377	−34.49%	3,993
Tuscaloosa	1,354	54.68%	1,122	45.32%	232	9.37%	2,476
Walker	1,426	50.69%	1,387	49.31%	39	1.39%	2,813
Washington	480	48.39%	512	51.61%	−32	−3.23%	992
Wilcox	4,652	96.31%	178	3.69%	4,474	92.63%	4,830
Winston	346	30.38%	793	69.62%	−447	−39.24%	1,139

1901 Alabama Constitution ratification vote by county: For (108,613 votes, 57.06%): 50–60%; 60–70%; 70–80%; 80–90%; 90–100%; Against (81,734 votes, 42.94%): 50–60%; 60–70%; 70–80%; 80–90%

== General overview ==
The Alabama Constitution, in common with all other state constitutions, defines a tripartite government organized under a presidential system. Executive power is vested in the Governor of Alabama, legislative power in the Alabama State Legislature (bicameral, composed of the Alabama House of Representatives and Alabama Senate), and judicial power in the Judiciary of Alabama. Direct, partisan, secret, free elections are provided for filling all branches.

== Notable features ==
The length and chaotic nature of the constitution was the result of an attempt at centralization of power in the state government dating from the late 19th century, when white Democrats dominated state government.

In addition, because of challenges from Populists in 1892 and 1894 elections, the Democratic Party intended to reduce suffrage in order to secure its own dominance. This appealed to yeomen farmers of North Alabama, who had supported Populists, on the grounds of white supremacy.

The Democrats raised "the Negro issue" and promised that "no white man would lose the franchise". But Alabama's new constitution also "would remove [from voter registration rolls] the less educated, less organized, more impoverished whites as well — and that would ensure one-party Democratic rule through most of the 20th century in the South". Glenn Feldman documented that, by 1941, more whites than blacks had been disenfranchised under this constitution.

The 1901 constitution was intended to curb executive power and to make it difficult to raise taxes, but in practice, it has resulted in the state legislature having extensive authority over counties, cities, and towns. The counties have to go to the legislature, and ipso facto representatives of uninvolved parts of the state, to get the most basic policy and financial laws passed, which often fail to get the support of the full legislature.

As a result, the state legislature devotes considerable time to local matters, and county legislative delegations handle many issues that are normally handled at the county level in most of the rest of the country.

The legislature's power was especially strong during the first half of the 20th century, and it was heavily biased in favor of rural interests. Originally, the state's 67 counties were the building blocks of legislative districts: Senate districts could only cover counties in their entirety, while House districts had to be self-contained within a county. The county's senator was in an especially powerful position, since the county legislative delegation decided nearly all local matters.

Although the both houses were to be apportioned based on each county's population, the legislature did not reapportion its districts for more than 60 years, despite the state constitution calling for reapportionment each decade after the national census. The fact counties could not be divided into several Senate districts also prevented the creation of senatorial districts with equal population. The vast differences in population between urban and rural counties through those decades resulted in rural areas being grossly over-represented in the legislature, giving them outsized influence over state affairs. Developing urban areas were underserved for decades and ill represented.

As a result of several federal court decisions in 1960-1967 that mandated the principle of "one man, one vote", members of both houses of the legislature are now elected from districts of roughly equal population, and the legislature is required to reapportion itself every decade.

Even with these changes, the legislature still has great power over local government, and devotes considerable time to local issues. With the buildup of the defense industry and regional needs during World War II in Birmingham and its area, Jefferson County was finally afforded limited home rule in 1944. Limited home rule has since been granted to six other counties: Lee, Mobile, Madison, Montgomery, Shelby, and Tuscaloosa.

All the other counties must lobby the local legislation committees of the state House and Senate to pass local ordinances, making passing even the simplest local laws a tedious process. Most county councils or commissions elect their members by at-large voting without proportional representation, which dilutes the political power of significant minorities and generally limits their ability to elect candidates of their choice.

The constitution addresses many issues that are dealt with by statute in most other states, most notably taxation. Unlike most states, a large portion of Alabama's tax code is written into the constitution, necessitating its amendment over even minor tax issues, which prevents most local governments from passing any ordinances on taxation. Although the home rule counties can pass ordinances on tax issues, even that authority is limited. For instance, Jefferson County cannot pass ordinances related to property taxes. According to The New York Times, Alabama's tax code is one of the most regressive in the nation.

Adding to the problem is the requirement that any constitutional amendment must be submitted for a statewide vote if it is not unanimously approved by the legislature. This has resulted in amendments relating to local counties and municipalities being overwhelmingly approved in the affected areas, but rejected statewide.

=== Racial discrimination ===
In the 21st century, the document has been criticized for discriminatory elements, though many of these have been made moot by amendments to the federal constitution, passage of federal laws, or United States Supreme Court decisions. As a result, they are not enforced because they are known to be unconstitutional, or would almost certainly be deemed so in court.

At the beginning of the 20th century, the President of the Alabama Constitutional Convention, John B. Knox, stated in his inaugural address that the intention of the convention was "to establish white supremacy in this State", "within the limits imposed by the Federal Constitution". The convention was following a model established by Mississippi, whose 1890 constitution with similar provisions had already survived federal court challenges, with the United States Supreme Court permitting literacy tests and poll taxes despite a challenge based on the 15th Amendment to the U.S. Constitution in Williams v. Mississippi (1898).

Section 181 required voters to pass literacy tests in order to register, which were administered subjectively by white administrators to ensure most blacks were rejected. Section 180 was a grandfather clause, creating an exemption from the literacy test for anyone who had served in the military, or was descended from a veteran. As most slaves had been prevented from serving in the military, freedmen and their descendants could not take advantage of this clause, but many illiterate whites could. Section 194 required the payment of US$1.50 poll tax (Worth approximately US$47.10 by CPI). According to historian Glenn Feldman, by 1940 the cumulative poll tax had disenfranchised more poor white voters than blacks, but this was due to a larger white population; the black population was still disenfranchised at much higher rates than whites. These provisions were invalidated by the Voting Rights Act of 1965, which provided for federal oversight and enforcement of constitutional rights to suffrage.

The state constitution outlawed interracial marriage (Section 102). While this provision was rendered inoperative by the US Supreme Court decision in Loving v. Virginia (1967), it was not removed until 2000 by Amendment 667 approved by voters.

The constitution contains its original requirement for public education to be racially segregated in the state. Section 256 states that "separate schools shall be provided for white and colored children, and no child of either race shall be permitted to attend a school of the other race". This provision was struck down by the United States Supreme Court ruling in Brown v. Board of Education in 1954 that segregation of public schools was unconstitutional, and this clause has not been enforced since the 1960s.

In 1956, following the Supreme Court decision, the legislature passed a constitutional amendment stating that the state did not guarantee a public education for the state's children, and also supported the formation of private schools to evade desegregation. In 1991, a state district judge ruled that this amendment ran counter to the federal Constitution. The state supreme court threw out the underlying case in 2002, but did so in a manner that left the status unclear of the 1956 amendment.

Critics say that the continued existence of segregationist language is an embarrassment to the state in the 21st century.

==== Attempts to remove ====
In 2004 and 2012, ballot measures were put before the electorate to remove the segregationist language from the constitution. The 2004 proposal was defeated by less than 2,000 votes; conservatives objected to the proposal because it would have retained a 1901 clause mandating "a liberal system of public schools", and feared it could be interpreted to require expanded financing for public education.

A Constitutional Revision Commission was organized and issued a proposal in 2012 for a vote on an amendment related to education issues. It was intended to delete the original text that mandated segregated schools. However, due to the manner in which the amendment was worded, it would have definitively reinstated the 1956 amendment that ended the guarantee of a public education to children of the state. As a result, it was opposed by both the Alabama Education Association and many black leaders. Both claimed the 1956 amendment could endanger future "legal challenges to the state’s school financing structure, substantially worsening inequality while cosmetically addressing it" by deleting racist language about segregation. Observers believed the bipartisan commission had some chance of success because it was "specifically barred from changing the tax code", but Amendment 4 was narrowly defeated.

In 2020, ballot measure Amendment 4 was put to the electorate, authorizing the State Legislature to recompile the Constitution during its 2022 session: this includes deleting all racist language, along with numerous duplicative and repealed provisions. This measure passed with an overwhelming majority of 66.82% of the electorate voting yes.

The State Legislature met for a session in 2022 to formally revise the document, where voters were required to approve the new constitution by a simple majority. The House of Representatives unanimously approved the proposed revision on February 24 and the Senate followed suit on March 3. The revision was voted on and passed by the voters in 2022.

Governor of Alabama Kay Ivey formally proclaimed the new constitution to be in effect on Monday, November 28, 2022, shortly after the state's election results were certified.

=== Voting restrictions ===
Section 177 denied women the right to vote by confining voting rights to "male citizens". This was rendered unenforceable by the 19th Amendment to the U.S. Constitution, which provided suffrage to women effective in 1920; nevertheless, the section remained as part of the state constitution until Amendment 579 was substituted, which contained no reference to gender.

Section 182 had disqualified from registering or voting all "idiots and insane persons", and persons who married interracially, or were convicted of "crime against nature" (homosexuality) or vagrancy. This section has also been struck down as unconstitutional.

=== Size and local relevance ===
The state legislature has passed numerous amendments to legislate issues that apply only to one or a few counties, as can be seen from the following examples:

- Bingo (Amendments 386 and 387 in Jefferson, further amended by Amendment 413 in Montgomery County, Amendment 440 in Mobile County, Amendment 506 in Etowah County, Amendment 508 in Calhoun County, Amendment 600 in Madison County, Amendment 612 in Russell County, Amendment 674 in Lowndes County, Amendment 692 in Limestone County, and Amendment 699 in Morgan County, the text of which are exactly or almost exactly the same)
- Mosquito control taxes in Mobile County (Amendment 351), which was later amended by Amendment 361 to remove a single word (tangible), then further amended by Amendment 393 to expand it to "other general health purposes" so long as these purposes do not take more than 50% of the collected money.
- Boll weevil taxes on cotton growers (Amendment 449)
- Promotion of catfish (Amendment 492), soybeans (Twice, Amendment 315 and Amendment 401), cattle (Twice, Amendment 201 and Amendment 452), poultry (Twice, Amendment 214 and amended by Amendment 428), swine (Twice, Amendment 327 and Amendment 400), an omnibus amendment for peanuts, milk, and cotton (Amendment 388), grain (Amendment 453), sheep and goats (Amendment 715), and shrimp and seafood generally (Amendment 766).
- Dead farm animals (Amendment 482) in Limestone County, to be administered by the County Commission
- Prostitution in Jefferson County (Amendment 688).
- Exhumation in Madison County (Amendment 520 by the County Commission), see also the above entry for Dead farm animals in Limestone County
- Forest fire tax levies in Marshall County (Amendment 439)
- Nuisance (Amendment 497 in Jefferson County)

The Legislature has amended amendments to correct language and legislate special taxation (See other sections for more examples):

- Public debt over Mobile County (Amendments 152 and 363 over Amendment 18)
- Promotion of Madison County and Huntsville (Amendment 254 over Amendment 191)
- Special taxation for public healthcare in Mobile County (Amendment 248 over Amendment 195)
- Taxation for "Furtherance of Education" in Jefferson County (Amendments 248, 260, and 298 over Amendment 175)
- Civic center bonds (Amendment 280 over Amendment 238)
- Fire protection and waste collection in Jefferson County (Amendments 314 and 369 over Amendment 239)
- Use of gas taxes (Amendment 354 over Amendment 93)
- Mosquito control taxes (See above)
- The State Judiciary (Amendments) 328, 364, and 426 over the original Article VI, later amendments 580 and 581 were made directly to the article and not previous amendments.
- School taxes in Huntsville (Amendment 407 over Amendment 218)
- Fire department districts in Etowah County (Amendment 445 over Amendment 432)
- The Jackson City Port Authority (Amendment 477 over Amendment 465)
- Constitutional amendments that deal with one county (Amendment 555 over Amendment 425)
- The Madison County Judiciary (Amendment 607 over Amendment 334)
- Corporation taxation (Amendment 662 over Amendment 212)
- Fire/Emergency services taxes in Montgomery County (Amendment 711 over Amendment 551)
- Calhoun County school district taxes (Amendment 720 over 291)
- More fire protection taxes, this time in DeKalb County (Amendment 728 over Amendment 637)
- Court costs for a new Russell County Jail (Amendment 736 over 507)
- Some reservoir Authority in Fayette County, Alabama (751 over Amendment 538)
- Even more fire protection taxes, now in Pickens County (Amendment 765 over Amendment 649)
- Section 97 prohibits deceased officials from receiving a salary.

=== Legality ===
The Alabama Constitution of 1901, Article 1, Section 2 states that "That all political power is inherent in the people, and all free governments are founded on their authority, and instituted for their benefit; and that, therefore, they have at all times an inalienable and indefeasible right to change their form of government in such manner as they may deem expedient." Article 1 Section 36 states: "That this enumeration of certain rights shall not impair or deny others retained by the people; and, to guard against any encroachments on the rights herein retained, we declare that everything in this Declaration of Rights is excepted out of the general powers of government, and shall forever remain inviolate." As a result, Article 1 of the Alabama Constitution of 1901 cannot be edited or altered by the legislature, as the abilities of the legislature are based on the general powers delegated in the document and do not include the ability to change Article 1. In order to alter Article 1 of the state constitution, it is necessary to convene a constitutional convention and after the proposed constitution is published, to call an election where the voters of the state can vote to accept the proposed constitution as written.

Note that the 2022 recompilation act is essentially identical to the delegated authority exercised by the state Secretary of State where the Secretary takes the text of an Act as passed by the legislature and signed into law by the governor and reformats the text into a hierarchical form recognized in The Code of Alabama of 1975. In jurisprudence, the Code citations are used to refer to the original Act to resolve questions before the court. This is because The Code of Alabama of 1975 is organized to be readable and indexable. The courts have held that when two sections of The Code of Alabama conflict, the more recently edited part takes precedence under the accepted assumption that the legislature is infallible. The basis for organizing the code thusly is written in Section 1-1-14 of The Code of Alabama of 1975:

SECTION 1-1-14 Classification and organization of Code; notes and catchlines of sections not part of law.

(a) The classification and organization of the titles, chapters, articles, divisions, subdivisions and sections of this Code, and the headings thereto, are made for the purpose of convenient reference and orderly arrangement, and no implication, inference or presumption of a legislative construction shall be drawn therefrom.

(b) Unless otherwise provided in this Code, the descriptive headings or catchlines immediately preceding or within the text of the individual sections of this Code, except the section numbers included in the headings or catchlines immediately preceding the text of such sections, do not constitute part of the law, and shall in no manner limit or expand the construction of any such section. All historical citations and notes set out in this Code are given for the purpose of convenient reference, and do not constitute part of the law.

== See also ==
- The Constitution of India, the world's longest national constitution
- The California Constitution, also known for its length
- The Texas Constitution, also known for its length
