= George Mason University =

Public university in Fairfax County, Virginia, US

- Former names: Northern Virginia University Center of the University of Virginia (1949–1956); University College of the University of Virginia (1956–1959); George Mason College of the University of Virginia (1959–1972)
- Motto: "Freedom and Learning"
- Type: Public research university
- Established: 1949; 77 years ago
- Founder: Virginia General Assembly
- Accreditation: SACS
- Academic affiliations: CUWMA; ORAU; SCHEV; Sea-grant
- Endowment: $257.6 million (2025)
- President: Gregory Washington
- Provost: Marion Underwood
- Rector: Michael J. Meese
- Academic staff: 2,128 (Fall 2025)
- Students: 39,638 (Fall 2025)
- Undergraduates: 28,364 (Fall 2025)
- Postgraduates: 10,742 (Fall 2025)
- Location: George Mason, Virginia, US; 38.831°N 77.308°W
- Campus: 953 acres (386 ha) (Fairfax / George Mason, Virginia), 1,148 acres (465 ha) total; Large suburb
- Location of campuses: Fairfax City/Fairfax County; Arlington; Front Royal; Prince William; Lorton; Incheon, South Korea
- Media: Fourth Estate (newspaper); WGMU Radio (radio station)
- Colors: Green; Gold
- Nickname: Patriots
- Sporting affiliations: NCAA Division I – A-10; ECAC; EIVA; IC4A; MAC–wrestling
- Mascot: The Patriot
- Website: gmu.edu

George Mason University (GMU) is a public research university in Fairfax County, Virginia, United States. Located in Northern Virginia near Washington, D.C., the university is named in honor of George Mason, a Founding Father of the United States.

The university was founded in 1949 as a northern branch of the University of Virginia. It became an independent university in 1972, and it has since grown into the largest public university in Virginia by student enrollment. It has expanded into a residential college for traditional students while maintaining its historic commuter student-inclusive environment at both undergraduate and post-graduate levels, with an emphasis on combining modern professional education with a traditional liberal arts curriculum.

The university operates four campuses; the flagship campus is in the Fairfax, Virginia, area. Its other three campuses are in Arlington, Front Royal, and Prince William County. It also operates a retreat and conference center in Lorton and an international campus in Incheon, South Korea. It is classified among "R1: Doctoral Universities – Very high research activity". Two of the university's professors have received the Nobel Memorial Prize in Economics: James M. Buchanan in 1986 and Vernon L. Smith in 2002.

== History ==
=== 20th century ===
In 1949, the University of Virginia created an extension center to serve mid-career working professionals and non-traditional students near urban centers in the Northern Virginia suburbs of Washington, D.C. The extension center offered both for credit and non-credit informal classes in the evenings at various pre-existing venues. The first for credit classes offered were: "Government in the Far East, Introduction to International Politics, English Composition, Principles of Economics, Mathematical Analysis, Introduction to Mathematical Statistics, and Principles of Lip Reading." By the end of 1952, enrollment was 1,192 students.

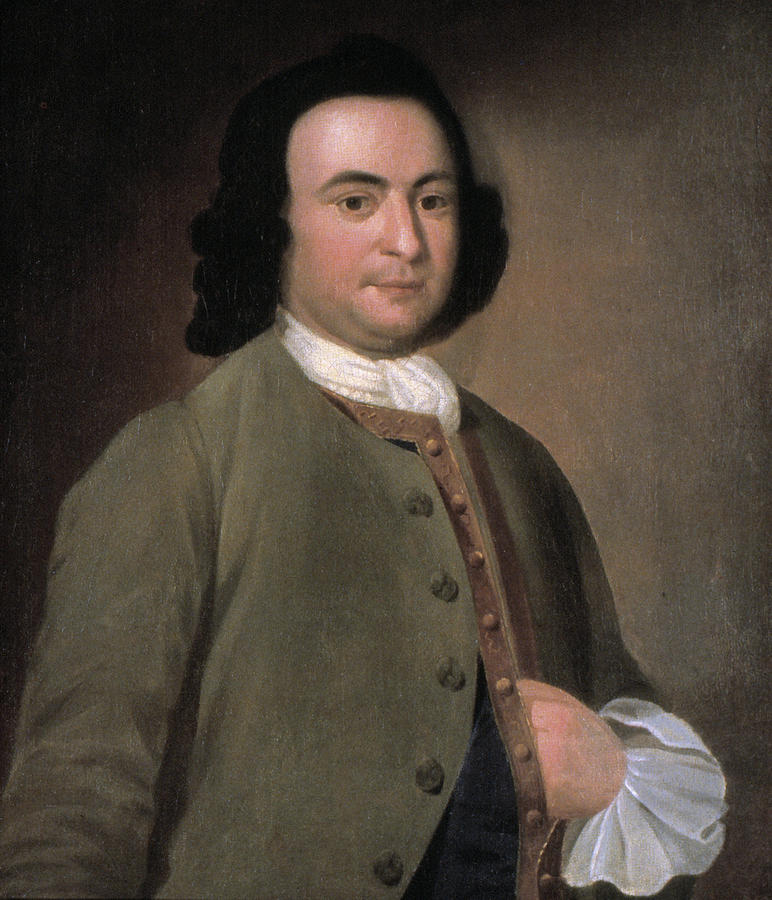
George Mason, a Founding Father of the United States and the university's namesake

A resolution of the Virginia General Assembly in January 1956 changed the extension center into University College, the Northern Virginia branch of the University of Virginia. John Norville Gibson Finley served as director. Seventeen freshmen students attended classes at University College in a small renovated elementary school building in Bailey's Crossroads starting in September 1957. In 1958 University College became George Mason College.

The City of Fairfax purchased and donated 150 acres (60 hectares) of land just south of the city limits to the University of Virginia for the college's new site, which is now referred to as the Fairfax Campus. In 1959, the Board of Visitors of the University of Virginia selected a permanent name for the college: George Mason College of the University of Virginia. The Fairfax campus construction planning that began in early 1960 showed visible results when the development of the first 40 acres (16 hectares) of Fairfax Campus began in 1962. In the Fall of 1964 the new campus welcomed 356 students.

In 1966, in the Virginia General Assembly, Alexandria delegate James M. Thomson, with the backing of the University of Virginia, introduced a bill in the General Assembly to make George Mason College a four-year institution under the University of Virginia's direction. The measure, known as H 33, passed the Assembly easily and was approved on March 1, 1966, making George Mason College a degree-granting institution. During that same year, the local jurisdictions of Fairfax County, Arlington County, and the cities of Alexandria and Falls Church agreed to appropriate $3 million to purchase land adjacent to Mason to provide for a 600-acre (240-hectare) Fairfax Campus with the intention that the institution would expand into a regional university of major proportions, including the granting of graduate degrees.

In 1972, Virginia separated George Mason College from the University of Virginia in Charlottesville and renamed it George Mason University.

In 1978, George W. Johnson was appointed to serve as the fourth president. Under his eighteen-year tenure, the university expanded both its physical size and program offerings at a tremendous rate. Shortly before Johnson's inauguration in April 1979, Mason acquired the School of Law and the new Arlington Campus. The university also became a doctoral institution. Toward the end of Johnson's term, Mason would be deep in planning for a third campus in Prince William County at Manassas. Major campus facilities, such as Student Union Building II, EagleBank Arena, Center for the Arts, and the Johnson Learning Center, were all constructed over the course of Johnson's eighteen years as University President. Enrollment once again more than doubled from 10,767 during the fall of 1978 to 24,368 in the spring of 1996.

In 1996, Alan Merten, dean of the Samuel Curtis Johnson Graduate School of Management at Cornell University was appointed the university's president. He believed that the university's location made it responsible for both contributing to and drawing from its surrounding communities—local, national, and global. George Mason was becoming recognized and acclaimed in all of these spheres. During Merten's tenure, the university hosted the World Congress of Information Technology in 1998, celebrated a second Nobel Memorial Prize-winning faculty member in 2002, and cheered the Men's basketball team in their NCAA Final Four appearance in 2006. Enrollment increased from just over 24,000 students in 1996 to approximately 33,000 during the spring semester of 2012, making Mason Virginia's largest public university.

=== 21st century ===
Following Merten's retirement in 2012, Ángel Cabrera was appointed the university's sixth president on July 1, 2012.

In a resolution on August 17, 2012, the board asked Cabrera to create a new strategic vision that would help Mason remain relevant and competitive in the future. The drafting of the Vision for Mason, from conception to official outline, created a new mission statement that defines the university.

On March 25, 2013, Cabrera held a press conference to announce the university's decision to leave the Colonial Athletic Association to join the Atlantic 10 Conference (A-10). The announcement came just days after the Board of Visitors' approval of the university's vision document that Cabrera had overseen. Mason began competition in the A-10 during the 2013–2014 academic year. The Chronicle of Higher Education listed Mason as one of the "Great Colleges to Work For" from 2010 to 2014. The Washington Post listed Mason as one of the "Top Workplaces" in 2014.

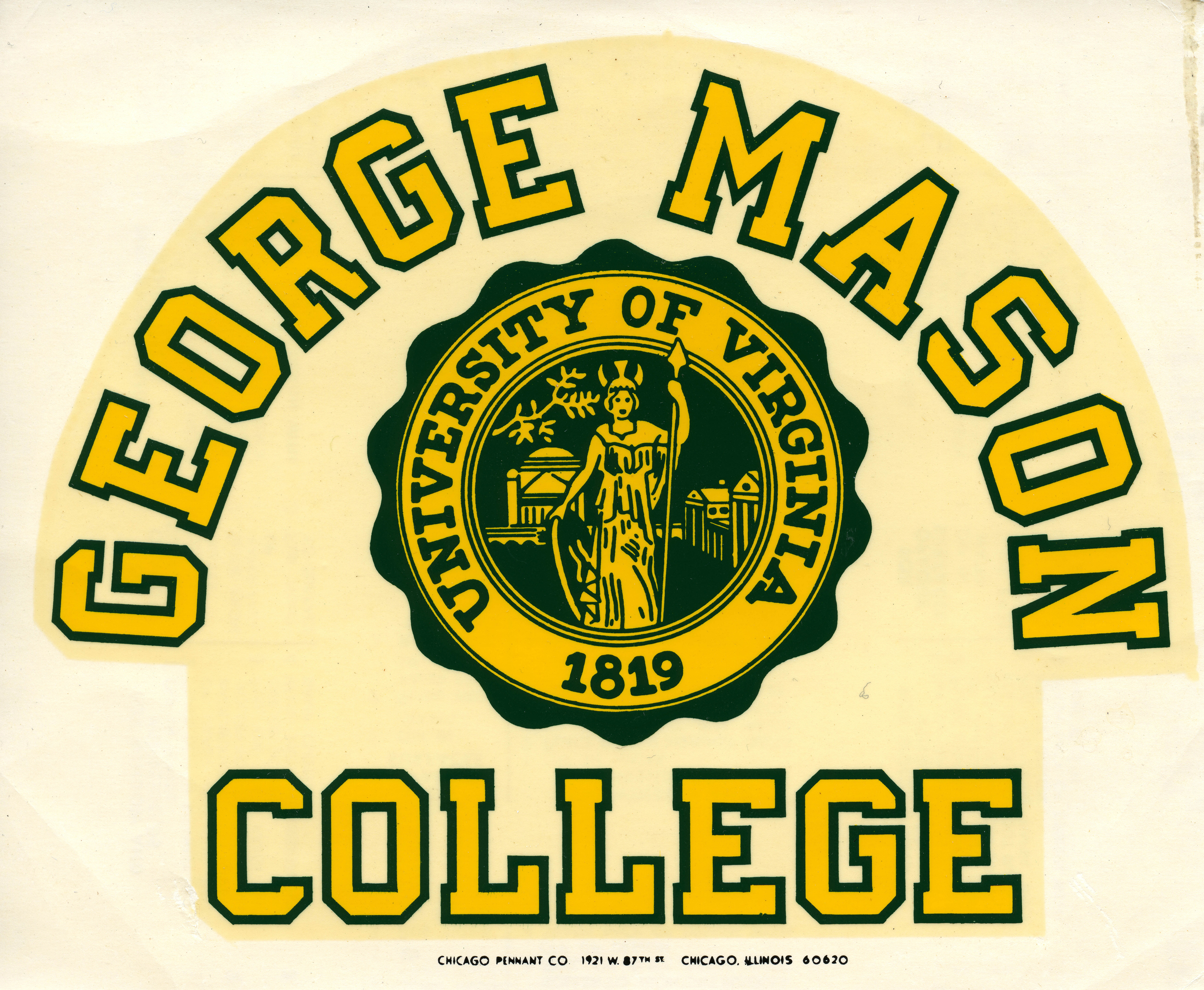
Decal of George Mason College

The WorldatWork Alliance for Work-Life Progress awarded Mason the Seal of Distinction in 2015. The AARP listed Mason as one of the Best Employers for Workers Over 50 in 2013. Phi Beta Kappa established a chapter at the university in 2013.

In 2018, a Freedom of Information Act lawsuit revealed that conservative donors, including the Charles Koch Foundation and Federalist Society, were given direct influence over faculty hiring decisions at the university's law and economics schools. GMU President Ángel Cabrera acknowledged that the revelations raised questions about the university's academic integrity and pledged to prohibit donors from sitting on faculty selection committees in the future.

Cabrera resigned his position on July 31, 2019, to become president of Georgia Tech. Following Cabrera's resignation, Anne B. Holton served as interim president until June 30, 2020.

On February 24, 2020, the Board of Visitors appointed Gregory Washington as the university's eighth president, and he assumed that role on July 1, 2020. Washington is the university's first African-American president.

On March 23, 2020, George Mason shifted to exclusively online instruction during the COVID-19 pandemic. Hybrid instruction occurred during the Fall 2020, Spring 2021, and Fall 2021 semesters during which the university offered a combination of online and in-person instruction.

Mild unrest occurred on George Mason's campus in the aftermath of the October 7, 2023 attack of Hamas on Israel and the resulting war. Statements denouncing antisemitism and Islamophobia were made by the Office of the President. An encampment on nearby George Washington University's campus was organized in part by George Mason students.

In August 2025, the Department of Education issued a press release claiming that the university had "violated Title VI by illegally using race and other immutable characteristics in university practices and policies, including hiring and promotion" in the name of "diversity, equity and inclusion."

== Campuses ==

George Mason University has four campuses in the United States, each of which is located in Virginia. Three are in the Northern Virginia suburbs of the Washington metropolitan area, and one is in Virginia's Blue Ridge Mountains. The university also has one campus in South Korea, in the Songdo International Business District of Incheon. Between 2005 and 2009 the university had a campus at Ras al-Khaimah, United Arab Emirates. The Blue Ridge campus, just outside Front Royal, is run in cooperation with the Smithsonian Institution.

=== Fairfax ===
The university's primary Fairfax Campus is situated on 677 acres (274 hectares) in central Fairfax County. The campus lies just south of the City of Fairfax, and approximately 20 miles (32 km) from Washington, D.C.. The City of Fairfax covers a small piece of the university grounds. The Fairfax Campus opened in 1964 with four buildings.

Notable buildings include the 320,000-square-foot (30,000 m^{2}) student union building, the Johnson Center; the Center for the Arts, a 2,000-seat concert hall; the 180,000-square-foot (17,000 m^{2}) Long and Kimmy Nguyen Engineering Building; Exploratory Hall for science, new in 2013; an astronomy observatory and telescope; the 88,900-square-foot (8,260 m^{2}) Art and Design Building; the newly expanded Fenwick Library, the Krasnow Institute; and three fully appointed gyms and an aquatic center for student use. The stadiums for indoor and outdoor track and field, baseball, softball, tennis, soccer and lacrosse are also on the Fairfax campus, as is Masonvale, a housing community for faculty, staff and graduate students.

==== George Mason statue and Enslaved People of George Mason Memorial ====
The bronze statue of George Mason on campus (Note: another bronze statue of George Mason can be found at the George Mason Memorial in Washington, D.C.) was created by Wendy M. Ross and dedicated on April 12, 1996. The 7 1/2 foot statue shows George Mason presenting his first draft of the Virginia Declaration of Rights which was later the basis for the U.S. Constitution's Bill of Rights. Beside Mason is a model of a writing table that is still in the study of Gunston Hall, Mason's Virginia estate. The books on the table, volumes of Hume, Locke, and Rousseau, represent influences in his thought.

In 2021, an Enslaved People of George Mason Monument designed by Perkins & Will was installed near the George Mason Statue. The memorial includes panels describing the lives of two of the enslaved at Gunston Hall: Penny, who was gifted by Mason to his daughter, and James, Mason's personal attendant.

=== Arlington ===
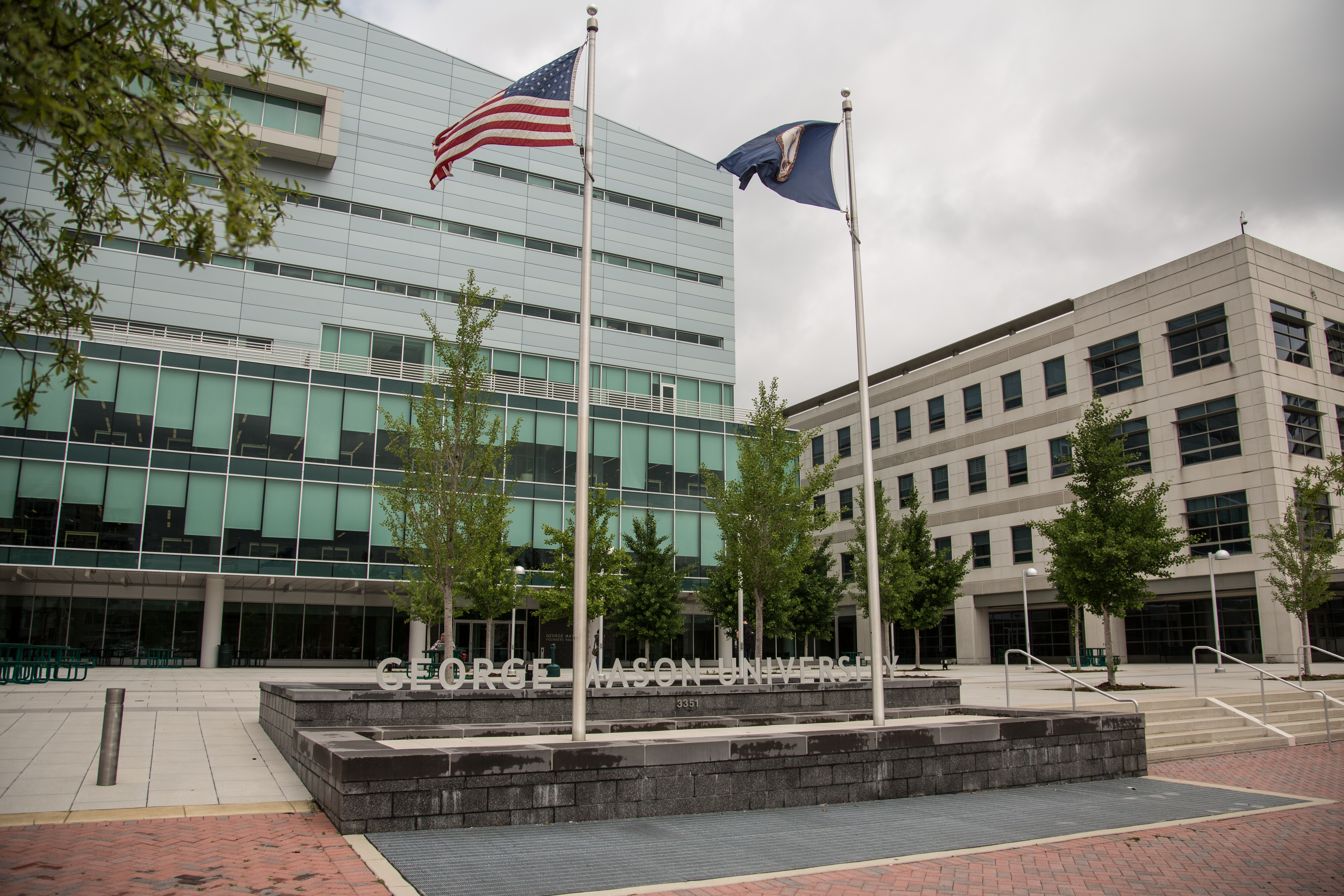
George Mason's Arlington Campus

The Arlington Campus, named Mason Square in 2022, is situated on 5.2 acres (2.1 hectares) in Virginia Square, an urban environment on the edge of Arlington County, Virginia's Clarendon business district and four miles (6.4 km) from downtown Washington, D.C. The campus was founded in 1979 with the acquisition of a law school. In 1998, Hazel Hall opened to house the Antonin Scalia Law School; subsequent development created Van Metre Hall (formerly Founders Hall), home of the Schar School of Policy and Government, the Center for Regional Analysis, and the graduate-level administrative offices for the School of Business. Vernon Smith Hall houses the Jimmy and Rosalynn Carter School for Peace and Conflict Resolution, the Mercatus Center, and the Institute for Humane Studies. The campus also houses the 300-seat Van Metre Hall Auditorium. A new building, Fuse at Mason Square, was completed in 2025.

==== Transportation ====
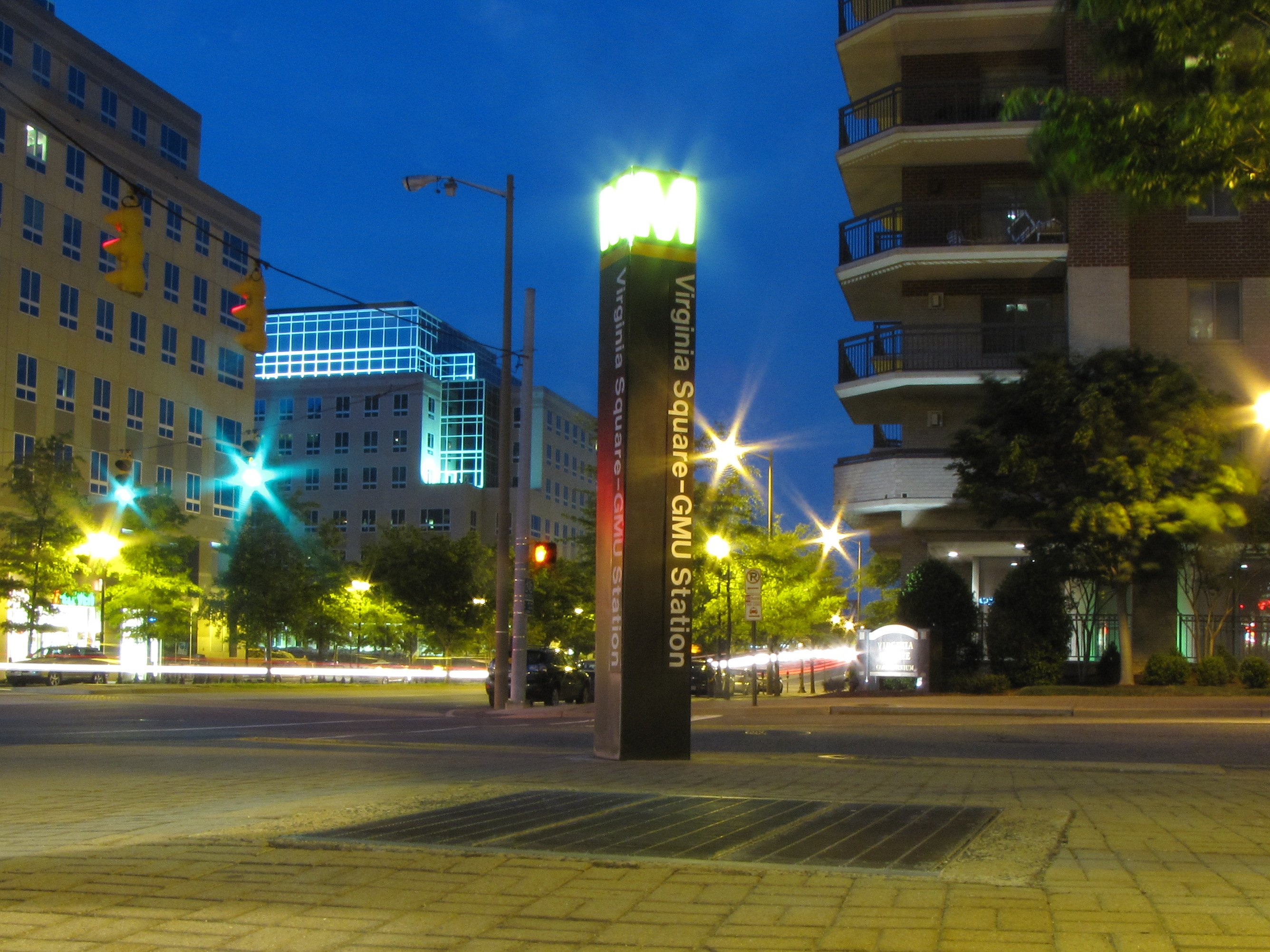
Washington Metro's Virginia Square-GMU campus stop

The campus is served by the Washington Metro's Orange and Silver lines at the Virginia Square–GMU station, a campus shuttle service, and Metrobus, Arlington Transit (ART), and OmniRide buses.

=== Science and Technology campus ===
The Science and Technology campus opened on August 25, 1997, as the Prince William campus in Manassas, Virginia, on 134 acres (54 hectares) of land, some still currently undeveloped. More than 4,000 students are enrolled in classes in bioinformatics, biotechnology, information technology, and forensic biosciences educational and research programs. There are undergraduate programs in health, fitness and recreation. There are graduate programs in exercise, fitness, health, geographic information systems, and facility management. Much of the research takes place in the high-security Biomedical Research Laboratory. The 1,123-seat Merchant Hall and the 300-seat Verizon Auditorium in the Hylton Performing Arts Center opened in 2010.

The 110,000-square-foot Freedom Aquatic and Fitness Center is operated by the Mason Enterprise Center. The Mason Center for Team and Organizational Learning stylized as EDGE is an experiential education facility open to the public. The Sports Medicine Assessment Research and Testing lab stylized as SMART Lab is located within the Freedom center. The SMART Lab is most known for its concussion research. On April 23, 2015, the campus was renamed to the Science and Technology Campus.

In 2019, the university engaged in a feasibility study of creating a medical school at the Prince William Campus.

=== Smithsonian-Mason School of Conservation ===
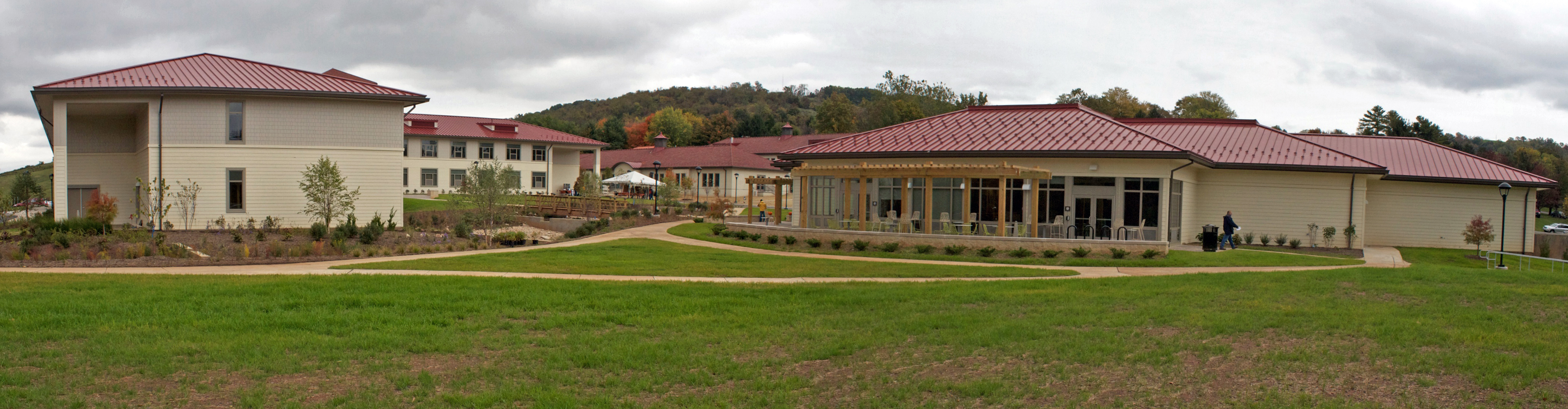
Smithsonian-Mason School of Conservation

The campus in Front Royal, Virginia, is a collaboration between the Smithsonian Institution and the university. Open to students in August 2012 after breaking ground on the project on June 29, 2011, the primary focus of the campus is global conservation training. The Volgenau Academic Center includes three teaching laboratories, four classrooms, and 18 offices. Shenandoah National Park is visible from the dining facility's indoor and outdoor seating. Living quarters include 60 double occupancy rooms, an exercise facility, and study space.

=== Mason Korea ===
Mason Korea Korea Campus
- University Campus
- Songdo Campus; Korean: 송도 캠퍼스
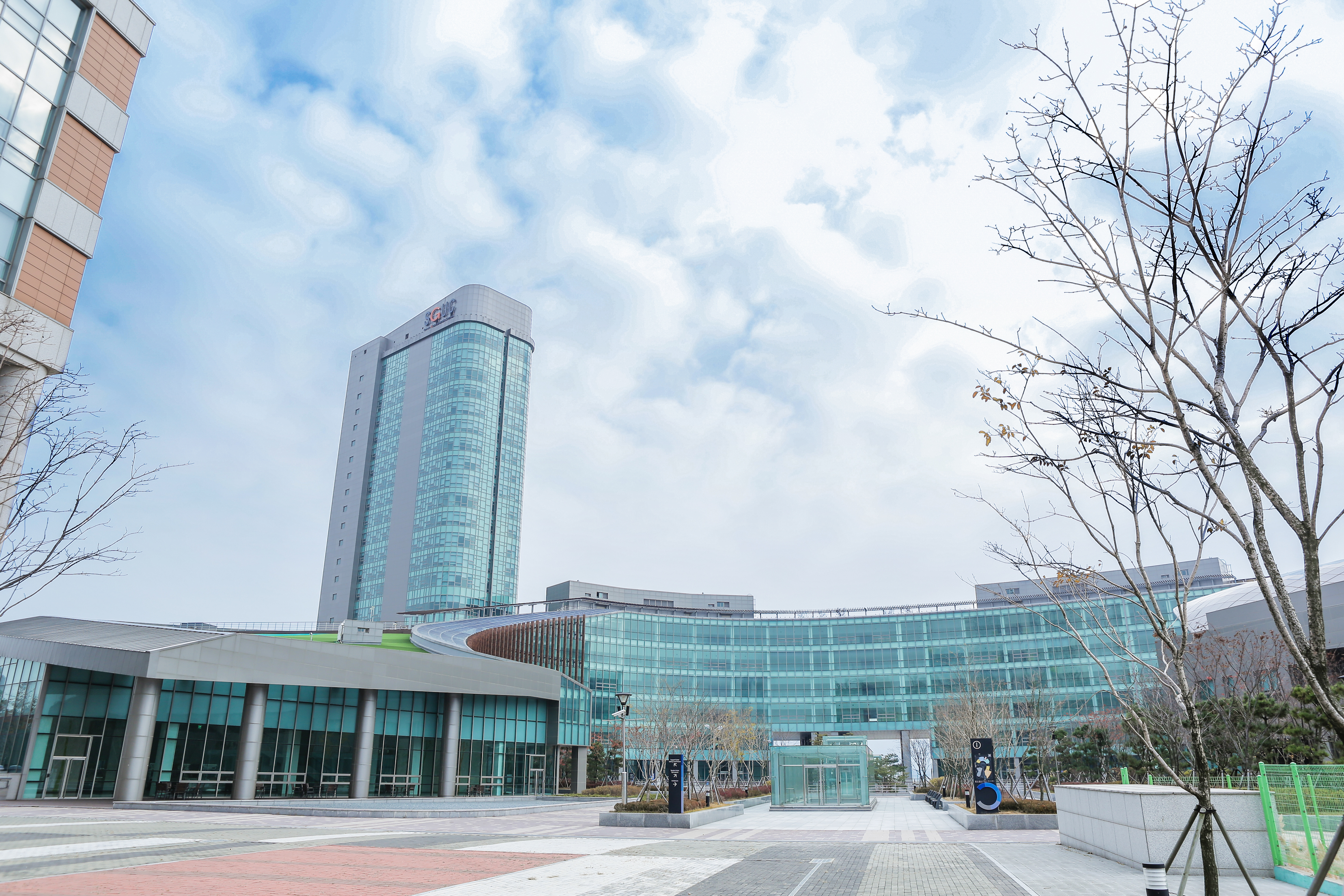
- Data Center, Library, Guest House, Student's Hall (Note: from left to right)
- Interactive map of Mason Korea
- Country: South Korea
- Region: Seoul Capital Area (Sudogwon)
- Metropolitan City: Incheon
- District: Yeonsu-gu
- International Business District: Songdo
- Postal Code: 21985
- Website: Official website

Opened in March 2014, Mason Korea is located in the Songdo International Business District in South Korea, a 42,000-acre (17,000-hectare) site designed for 850,000 people. It is located 25 miles (40 km) from Seoul and a two-hour flight from China and Japan, and is connected to the Seoul Metropolitan Subway.

The Commonwealth of Virginia considers the Songdo campus legally no different from any other Mason campus:

"... board of visitors shall have the same powers with respect to operation and governance of its branch campus in Korea as are vested in the board by the Code of Virginia with respect to George Mason University in Virginia ..."

Mason Korea's first commencement class graduated in December 2017.

Students can take seven bachelor's degree courses in Mason Korea.

Students from Mason Korea earn the same diploma as home campus students, with English as the language of instruction.

== Academics ==
Academic rankings

National
- Forbes: 91
- U.S. News & World Report: 109
- Washington Monthly: 61
- WSJ/College Pulse: 71

Global
- ARWU: 201–300
- QS: 951–1000
- THE: 401–500
- U.S. News & World Report: 503 (tie)

Mason offers undergraduate, graduate master's, law, and doctoral degrees with an emphasis on combining modern practice-based professional education with a comprehensive traditional liberal arts curriculum. The student-faculty ratio is 17:1; 58 percent of undergraduate classes have fewer than 30 students and 30 percent of undergraduate classes have fewer than 20 students.

=== Rankings ===
In 2024, U.S. News & World Report ranked George Mason tied at #109 out of 436 National Universities, tied at #52 in Top Public Schools, #156 in Best Value Schools, tied at #98 in Best Undergraduate Engineering Programs at schools where doctorate not offered, tied at #114 in Nursing, tied at #93 in Economics, tied at #20 in Co-ops/Internships, tied at #70 in Best Colleges for Veterans, #25 in Most Innovative Schools, and tied at #82 in Top Performers on Social Mobility.

=== Undergraduate admissions ===
In 2024, the university accepted 90% of its undergraduate applicants, and did not consider high school class rank or require standardized test scores for admission. Those admitted had an average 3.68 high school GPA. For those submitting scores the average student had an SAT score of 1250 (38% submitting scores) or an average ACT score of 28 (3% submitting scores).

=== Student statistics ===
Between 2009 and 2013, George Mason saw a 21% increase in the number of applications, has enrolled 4% more new degree-seeking students, and has seen the percentage of undergraduate and graduate applications accepted each decrease by 4%. Law applications accepted increased by 10%. Mason enrolled 33,917 students for fall 2013, up 956 (+3%) from fall 2012. Undergraduate students made up 65% (21,990) of the fall enrollment, graduate students 34% (11,399), and law students 2% (528). Undergraduate headcount was 1,337 higher than fall 2012 (+7%); graduate headcount was 262 lower (−2%); and law student headcount was 119 lower (−18%). Matriculated students come from all 50 states and 122 foreign countries. As of fall 2014, the university had 33,791 students enrolled, including 21,672 undergraduates, 7,022 seeking master's degrees, 2,264 seeking doctoral degrees and 493 seeking law degrees. As of 2023, the university enrolled 40,185 students, making it the largest university by head count in Virginia.

=== Academic affiliations ===
- Consortium of Universities of the Washington Metropolitan Area (CUWMA)
- National Sea Grant College Program (Sea-grant)
- Oak Ridge Associated Universities (ORAU)
- Smithsonian Institution (SI) – Smithsonian Conservation Biology Institute (SCBI)
- State Council of Higher Education for Virginia (SCHEV)
- Transatlantic Policy Consortium (TPC)
- Washington Research Library Consortium (WRLC)

== Research ==
George Mason University hosts $149 million in sponsored research projects annually, as of 2019. In 2016, Mason was classified among "R1: Doctoral Universities – Very high research activity". Mason moved into this classification based on a review of its 2013–2014 data that was performed by the Center for Postsecondary Research at Indiana University.

The research is focused on health, sustainability and security. In health, researchers focus is on wellness, disease prevention, advanced diagnostics and biomedical analytics. Sustainability research examines climate change, natural disaster forecasting, and risk assessment. Mason's security experts study domestic and international security as well as cyber security.

=== Centers and institutes ===
The Mercatus Center, a free-market oriented think tank.

The university is home to numerous research centers and institutes.

- Center for Applied Proteomics and Molecular Medicine
- Center for Clean Water and Sustainable Technologies (CCWST)
- Center for Climate Change Communication (4C)
- Center for Collision Safety and Analysis
- Center for Excellence in Command, Control, Communications, Computing and Intelligence (C4I)
- Center for Infrastructure Security in the Era of AI (ISEAI)
- Center for Humanities Research
- Center for Location Science
- Center for Neural Informatics
- Center for Peacemaking Practice
- Center for Real Estate Entrepreneurship
- Center for Regional Analysis
- Center for Social Complexity
- Center for Study of Public Choice
- Center for Neural Informatics, Structures, and Plasticity (CN3)
- Center for Well-Being
- Forensic Science Research and Training Laboratory
- Institute for Advanced Biomedical Research
- Institute for Digital Innovation (IDIA)
- Interdisciplinary Center for Economic Science
- Krasnow Institute for Advanced Study
- Mercatus Center
- National Center for Biodefense and Infectious Diseases
- Roy Rosenzweig Center for History and New Media
- SMART Lab (Sports Medicine Assessment, Research & Testing)
- Stephen S. Fuller Institute
- Michael V. Hayden Center for Intelligence, Policy, and International Security
- Center for Security Policy Studies
- Center for Transportation Public-Private Partnership Policy
- Center on Nonprofits, Philanthropy, and Social Enterprise
- Terrorism, Transnational Crime and Corruption Center (TraCCC)
- Center for Energy Science and Policy
- National Security Institute
- Center for Government Contracting
- Global Antitrust Institute
- Center for World Religions, Diplomacy and Conflict Resolution
- Center for the Study of Gender and Conflict Resolution
- Peace and Conflict Studies Center Asia (PACSC Asia)
- Center for the Study of Narrative and Conflict Resolution
- Mary Hoch Center for Reconciliation

== Student life and community relations ==
Undergraduate demographics as of Fall 2023
Race and ethnicity	Total
White	33%
Asian	24%
Hispanic	17%
Black	12%
Two or more races	6%
International student	5%
Unknown	3%
Economic diversity
Low-income (Note: The percentage of students who received an income-based federal Pell grant intended for low-income students.)	30%
Affluent (Note: The percentage of students who are a part of the American middle class at the bare minimum.)	70%

=== Traditions ===
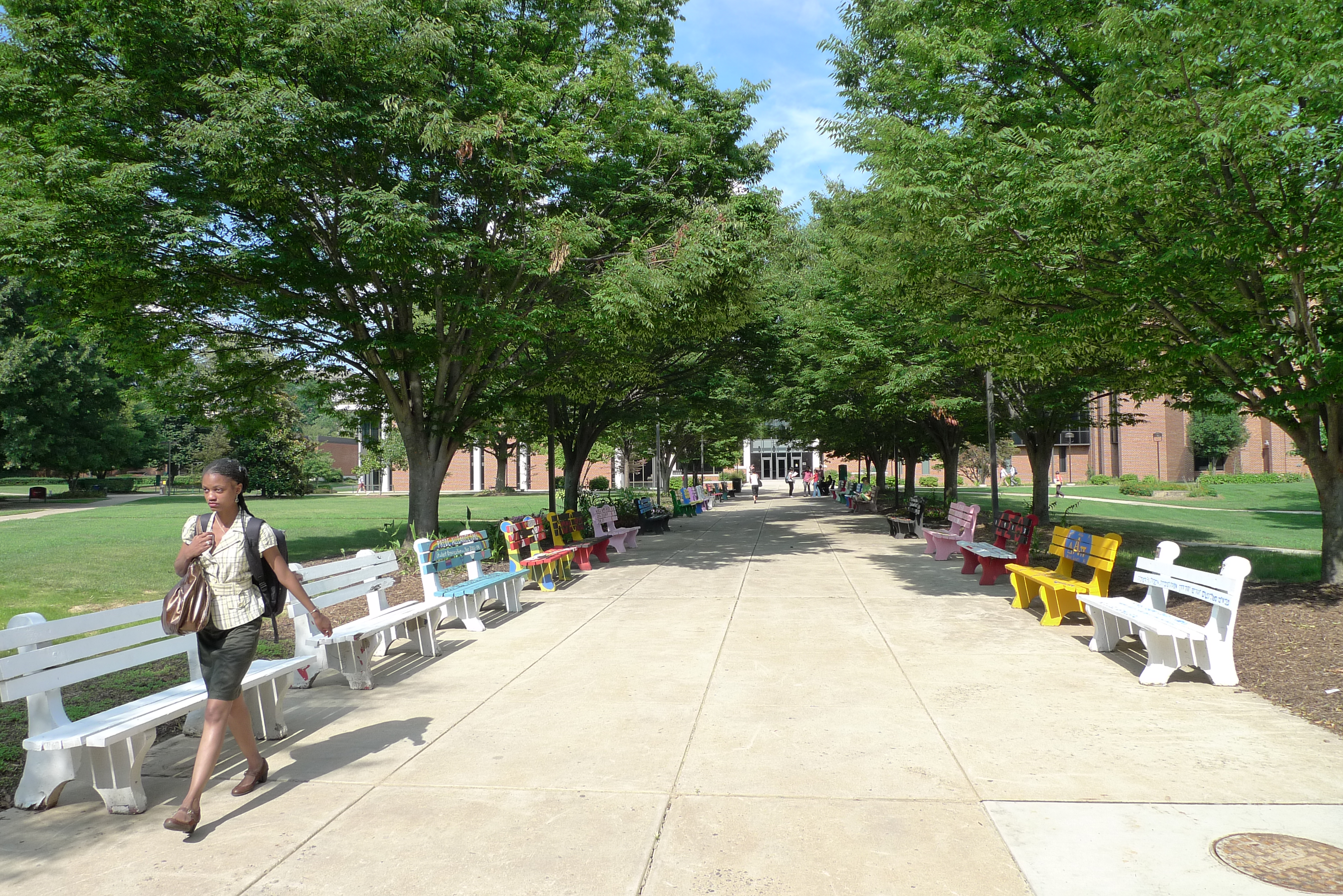
Benches painted by students outside the Fenwick Library

Students have often decorated the George Mason statue on the Fairfax campus for events. Some have rubbed the statue toe to bring good luck. Many pose with the statue for graduation photographs. Between 1988 and 1990 Anthony Maiello wrote the original George Mason Fight Song, which was edited by Michael Nickens in 2009.

Each spring, student organizations at Mason compete to paint one of the 38 benches located on the Quad in front of Fenwick Library. For years, student organizations have painted those benches that line the walkway to gain recognition for their group. With more than 300 student organizations, there is much competition to paint the benches. Painting takes place in the spring.

=== Housing ===
George Mason University has around 40 residence halls in the Fairfax campus, 22 of which are used specifically for freshmen. Many halls are named after famous Virginia regions and terms.

==== Freshman housing ====
- Commonwealth Hall – A suite-style hall with a capacity of around 240 students
- Dominion Hall – A suite-style hall with a capacity of around 240 students
- Presidents Park – A traditional-style complex of twelve halls, with a total capacity of around 1000 students; the halls are Adams, Harrison, Jackson, Jefferson, Kennedy, Lincoln, Madison, Monroe, Roosevelt, Truman, Washington, and Wilson
- Taylor Hall – A traditional-style hall with a capacity of around 300 students
- The Commons – A traditional-style complex of seven halls, with a total capacity of around 500 students; the halls are Amherst, Brunswick, Carroll, Dickinson, Essex, Franklin, and Grayson

==== Upper-class housing ====
- Eastern Shore – A suite-style hall with a capacity of around 200 students
- Blue Ridge and Sandbridge – Two connected suite-style halls with a total capacity of around 400 students
- Piedmont and Tidewater – Two connected suite-style halls with a total capacity of around 350 students
- Whitetop – A suite-style hall with a capacity of around 300 students
- Hampton Roads Hall – A suite-style hall with a capacity of around 450 students
- Angel Cabrera Global Center – A suite-style hall with a capacity of around 300 students
- Liberty Square – An apartment-style hall with a capacity of around 500 students, split into five wings, lettered A-E
- Rogers Hall – An apartment-style hall with a capacity of slightly over 300 students
- Northern Neck – An apartment-style hall with a capacity of slightly over 300 students
- Potomac Heights – An apartment-style hall with a capacity of around 500 students
- The Townhouses – Apartments located 1/8 mile from the Fairfax campus, with a total capacity of around 100 students

==== Graduate housing ====
- Beacon Hall – An apartment-style hall with a capacity of around 200 students

=== Student organizations ===
Student organizations may have academic, social, athletic, religious/irreligious, career, or other focus. The university recognizes 500 such groups.

Mason sponsors several student-run media outlets through the Office of Student Media.

- Fourth Estate: Website and weekly student newspaper, available on Mondays
- Phoebe: A journal that annually publishes original works of literature and art
- WGMU Radio: Broadcasts a wide array of music, talk, sports, and news programming. WGMU is also the flagship station for George Mason's men's and women's basketball teams, part of the Go Mason Digital Network.

=== Greek life ===
Mason recognizes 42 fraternities and sororities, with a total Greek population of about 1,800. Mason does not have a traditional "Greek Row" of housing specifically for fraternities, although recruitment, charitable events—including a spring Greek Week—and other chapter activities take place on the Fairfax Campus.

=== Athletics ===
==== Division I teams ====
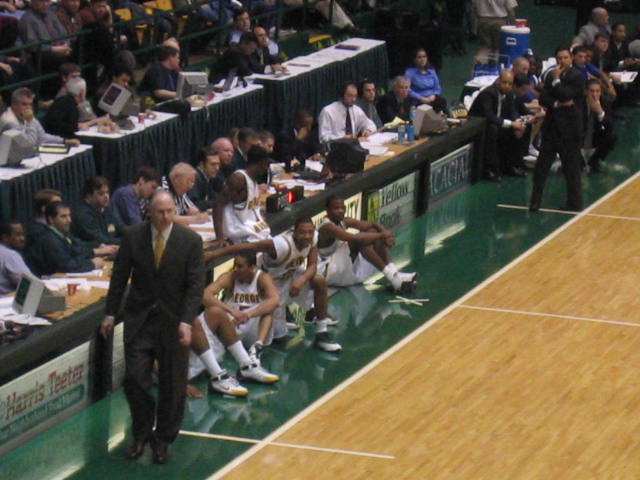
Hofstra visits the Patriot Center, now known as EagleBank Arena, in January 2005.

The George Mason Patriots are the athletic teams of George Mason University located in Fairfax, Virginia. The Patriots compete in Division I of the National Collegiate Athletic Association as members of the Atlantic 10 Conference for most sports. About 485 student-athletes compete in 22 men's and women's Division I sports – baseball, basketball, cross-country, golf, lacrosse, rowing, soccer, softball, swimming and diving, tennis, indoor and outdoor track and field, volleyball, and wrestling. Intercollegiate men's and women's teams are members of the National Athletic Association (NCAA) Division I, the Atlantic 10, the Eastern College Athletic Conference (ECAC), the Eastern Intercollegiate Volleyball Association (EIVA), the Eastern Wrestling League (EWL), and the Intercollegiate Association of Amateur Athletes of America (IC4A).

==== Intramural club sports ====
In addition to its NCAA Division I teams, George Mason University has several club sports.

==== Performing arts ====
The Mason Players is a faculty-led student organization that produces six productions per year.

=== Cultural capital, political influence, and controversy ===
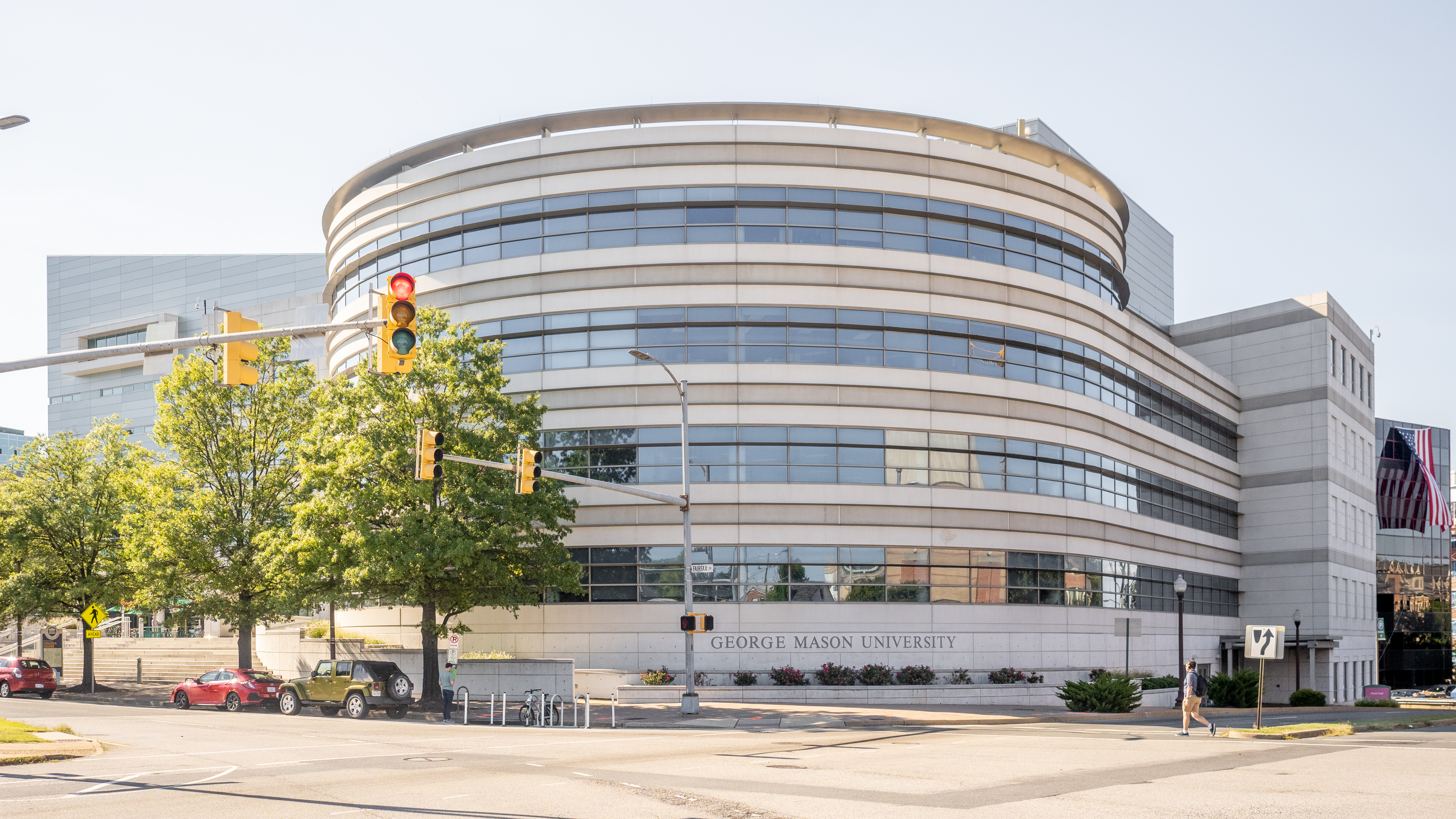
The Antonin Scalia Law School was called "a Yale or Harvard of conservative legal scholarship and influence" by The New York Times.

According to U.S. News & World Report University Rankings, George Mason University is ranked #1 in Social Mobility among universities in the Commonwealth of Virginia and nationally ranked #72 in Top Performers on Social Mobility. The New York Times Top U.S. Colleges with the Greatest Economic Diversity ranking ranks the university at #19 for advancing social mobility for its students and alumni and having socioeconomic status diversity through cultural capital. The university is also ranked No. 8 in the nation for Freedom of Speech and protecting rights enshrined in the First Amendment to the United States Constitution according to the Foundation for Individual Rights and Expression (FIRE), FIRE also posits that the majority viewpoint of the student body leans politically liberal in the sense of modern liberalism in the United States, although the political ideologies of libertarianism in the United States and conservatism in the United States are also visible on campus with the university stating that it strives for "comprehensive ideological balance," evidence including but not limited to the university being "home to both the Antonin Scalia Law School and the Jimmy and Rosalynn Carter School for Peace and Conflict Resolution," named after conservative U.S. Supreme Court Justice Antonin Scalia, and liberal Democratic U.S. President Jimmy Carter and First Lady Rosalynn Carter, respectively.

==== Demographics ====
According to the U.S. Department of Education College Scorecard, 44% of students have taken on federal student loans, and in terms of socioeconomic diversity, 28% of students have received Pell grants reserved for low-income students. Among undergraduate students, 80% of students are enrolled full-time while 20% are enrolled part-time

In terms of ethnic and racial demographics: American Indian/Alaska Native people make up 0% of the student body and 0% of the full-time staff; Asian people make up 22% of the student body and 14% of the full-time staff; Black people make up 11% of the student body and 5% of the full-time staff; Hispanic and Latino people make up 17% of the student population and 3% of the full-time staff; Native Hawaiian/Pacific Islander people make up 0% of the student body and 0% of the full-time staff; non-resident alien people make up 5% of the student body and 8% of the full-time staff; people of two or more races/multiracial people make up 5% of the student body and 2% of the full-time staff; people of an Unknown ethno-racial demographic make up 3% of the student body and 3% of the full-time staff; and White people make up 36% of the student body and 65% of the full-time staff.

==== Koch Foundation funding and Economics Department ====
George Mason University has been subject to controversy surrounding donations from the Charles Koch Foundation, in particular to the College of Humanities and Social Sciences' Department of Economics, which was seen as being allegedly influenced by libertarian political thought, evidenced by the political activities of the Koch brothers. University documents revealed that the Koch brothers were given the ability to pick candidates as a condition of monetary donations. George Mason University altered its donor rules following the controversy.

==== Public policy school ====
George Mason University's public policy school and political science department, the Schar School of Policy and Government, was the subject of some controversy over its relationship with former US intelligence agency personnel. In particular, the 2009 hiring of General Michael Hayden, former director of the Central Intelligence Agency and the National Security Agency (NSA), and of Robert Deitz, former general counsel of the NSA, were controversial due to Hayden's and Deitz's intelligence careers which involved lawful but unpopular use of mass surveillance.

==== Historical hoaxes ====
The George Mason University's historical hoaxes were a group of internet hoaxes and disinformation campaigns created by students as part of a class project for a course on "Lying about the Past" taught by history professor T. Mills Kelly, with the goal of creating an Internet deception that affected news media platforms.

=== Sexual misconduct ===
In 2016 a male student won an appeal overturning his suspension for sexual assault.

The Title IX process (which investigates sex discrimination) at George Mason University has continued to be subject to controversy. Following the hiring of Brett Kavanaugh as a visiting professor in the law school in 2019, students circulated a petition demanding not only the removal of Kavanaugh, but to increase the number of Title IX Coordinators on campus. The petition received 10,000 signatures and resulted in approval for funding for two more Title IX Coordinator positions.

In 2018, Peter Pober was alleged to have committed sexual misconduct during his tenure as a competitive speech coach. He retired while being investigated for misconduct.

=== Department of Education and Department of Justice investigations ===
In July 2025, the US Department of Education announced two investigations of the university, one concerning "allegations that it failed to respond effectively to a pervasively hostile environment for Jewish students and faculty from October 2023 through the 2024–2025 academic year," and another "based on a complaint filed with OCR by multiple professors at GMU who allege that the university illegally uses race and other immutable characteristics in university policies, including hiring and promotion."

On July 17, 2025, the US Department of Justice (DOJ) announced an investigation into possible discriminatory hiring and promotion practices at GMU. In their letter to the university, the DOJ made several claims regarding racial or gender-oriented hiring preferences. GMU's president, Gregory Washington, responded to the announcement the following day with a public statement providing context on some of the accusations and a statement that they intend to cooperate fully and had already removed some of the policies in question. They also state that they had been obeying the current state laws on the matter at the time the messages and posts in the DOJ letter were made.

On July 21, 2025, the DOJ announced a second investigation, this time into admissions procedures and awarding of student benefits and scholarships and their compliance with federal non-discrimination laws. The second investigation's letter to the University makes no specific accusations about admissions practices or student treatment, instead listing this investigation as a compliance check, but GMU's public response mentions allegations of non-compliance with these policies and DOJ concerns over the university response to anti-semitism on campus.

On July 25, 2025, the Department of Justice stated its plans to review a resolution by the Faculty Senate which had quoted from the university's 2023 strategic plan.

== Notable faculty and alumni ==
=== Faculty ===
Notable George Mason University faculty include:

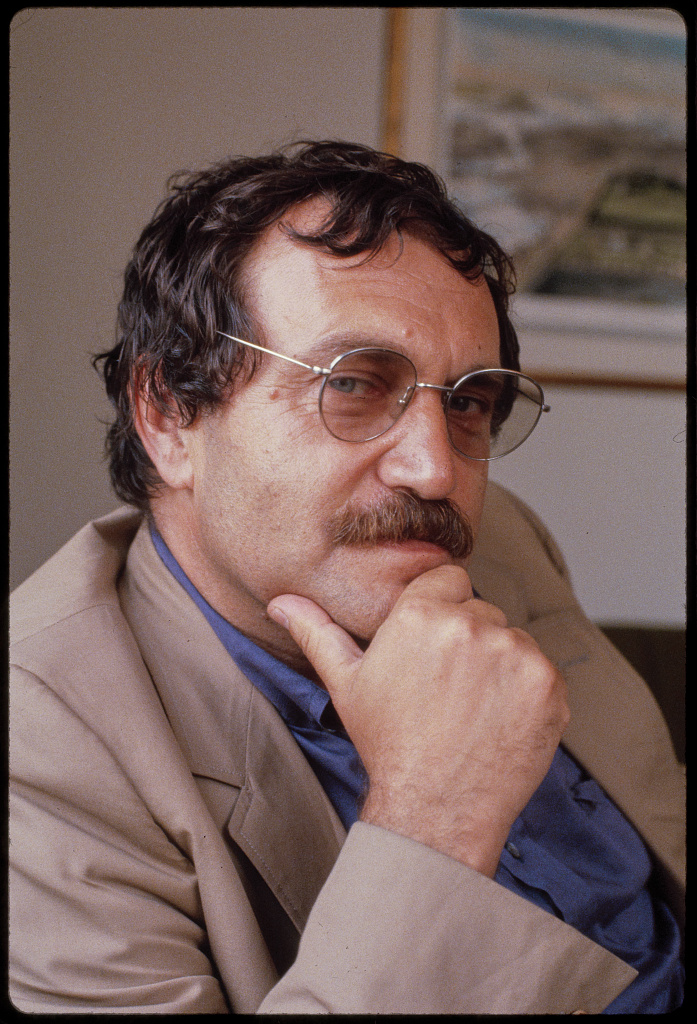
Vasily Aksyonov, Russian novelist, poet, and anti-totalitarian dissident

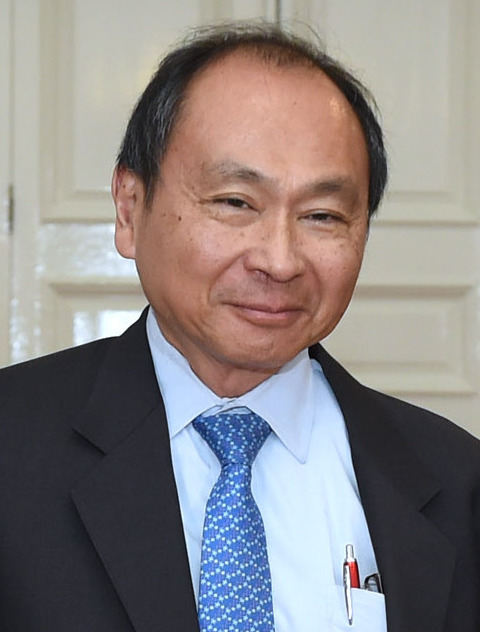
Francis Fukuyama, political scientist, political economist, and international relations scholar

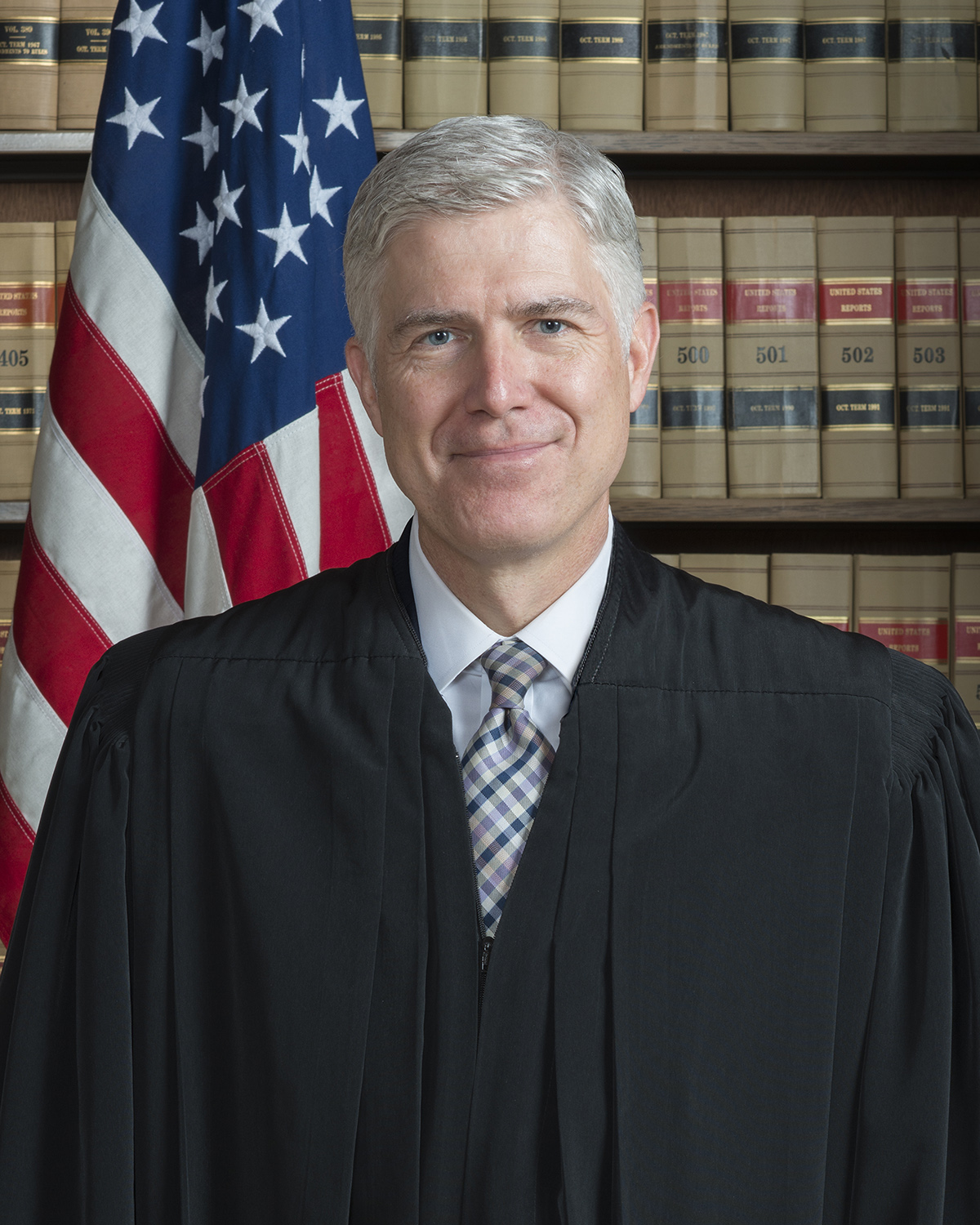
Neil Gorsuch, U.S. Supreme Court associate justice

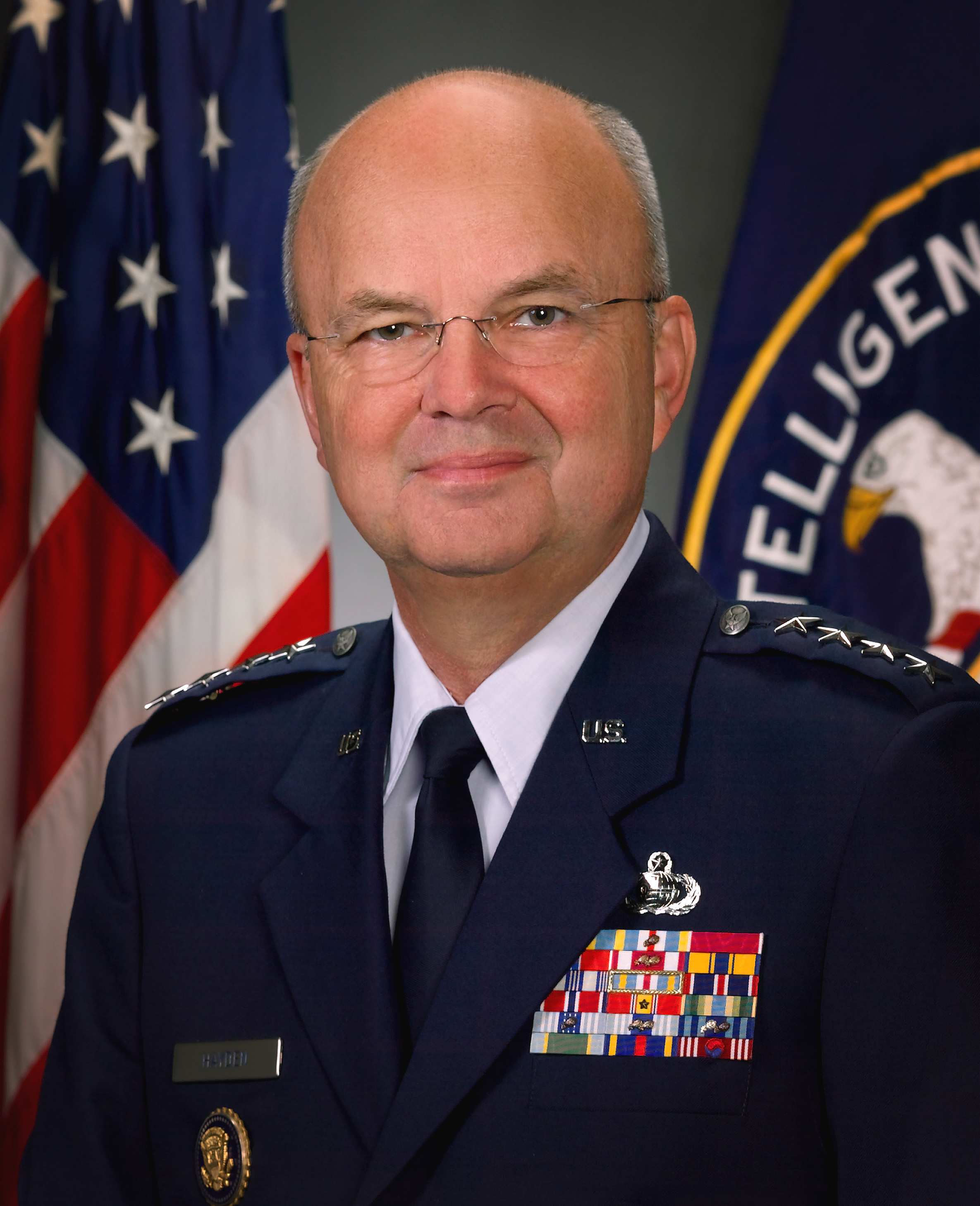
Michael Hayden, former director, Central Intelligence Agency and National Security Agency

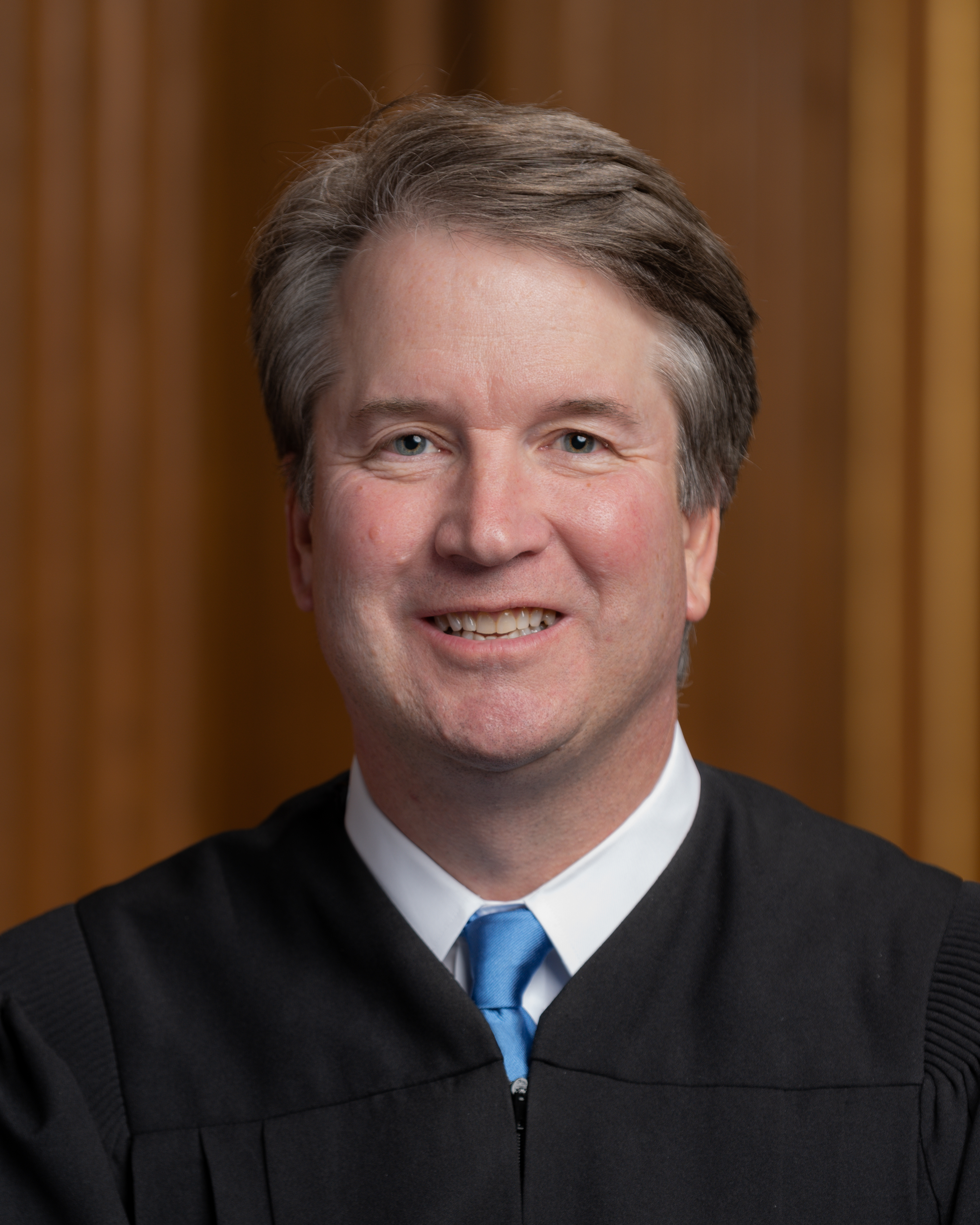
Brett Kavanaugh, U.S. Supreme Court associate justice

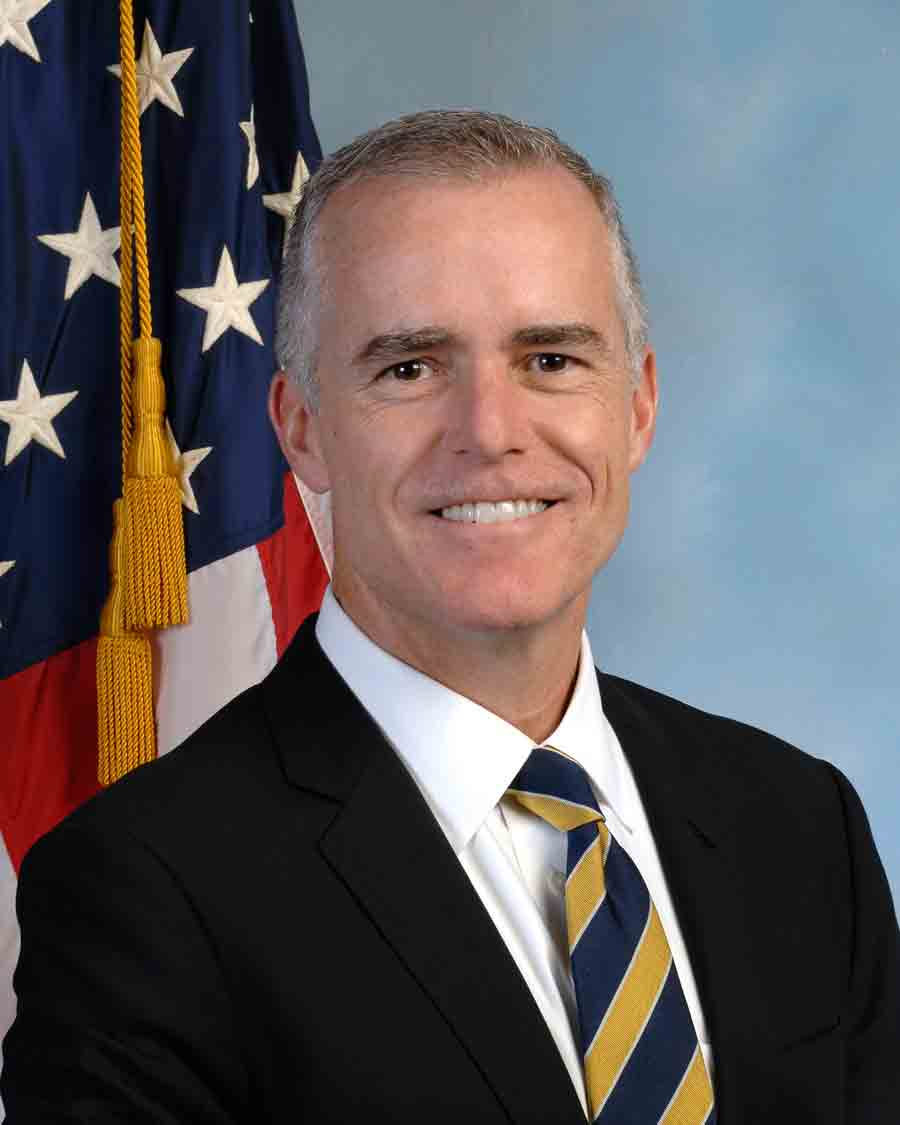
Andrew McCabe, former acting director, Federal Bureau of Investigation

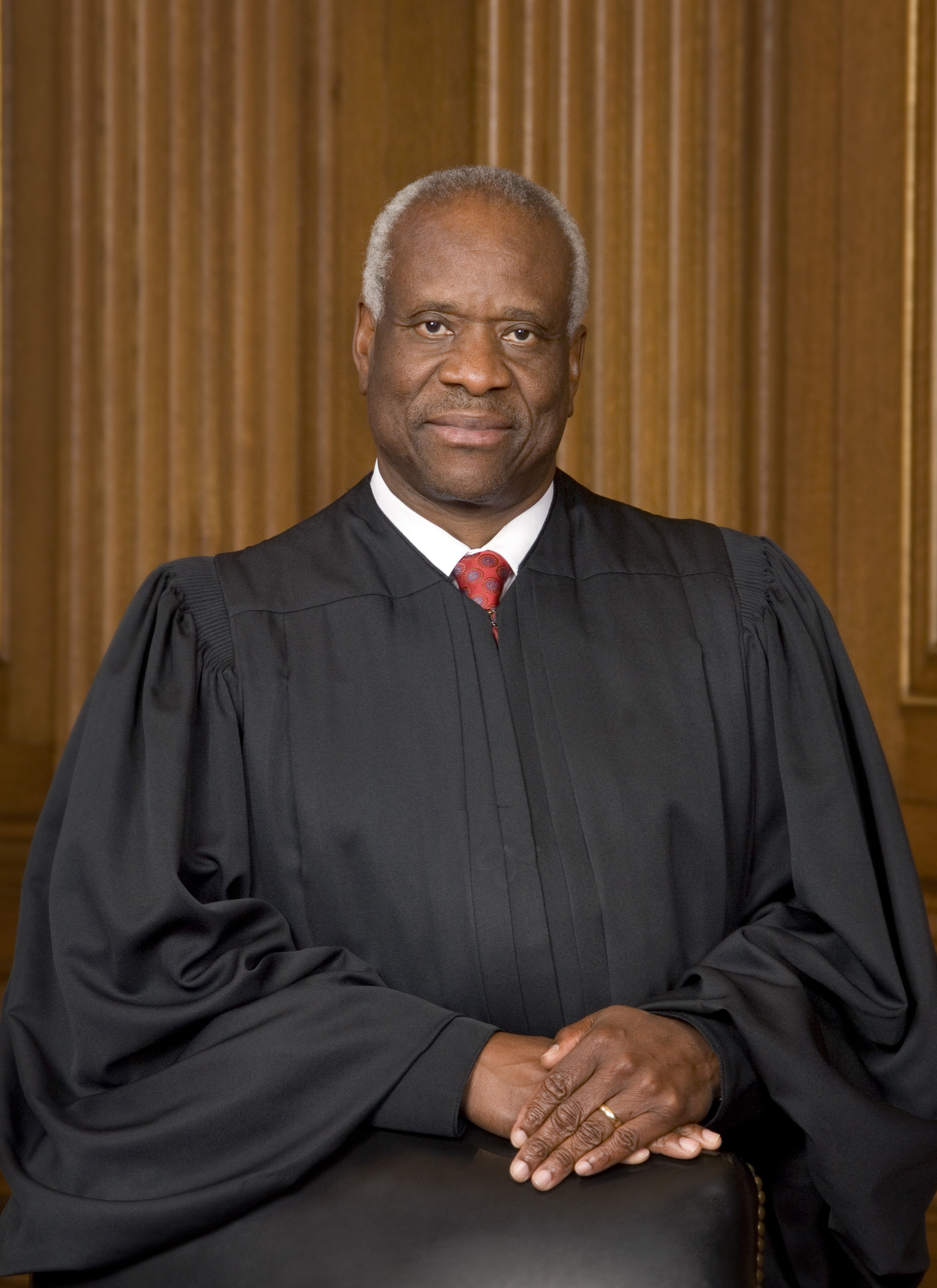
Clarence Thomas, U.S. Supreme Court associate justice

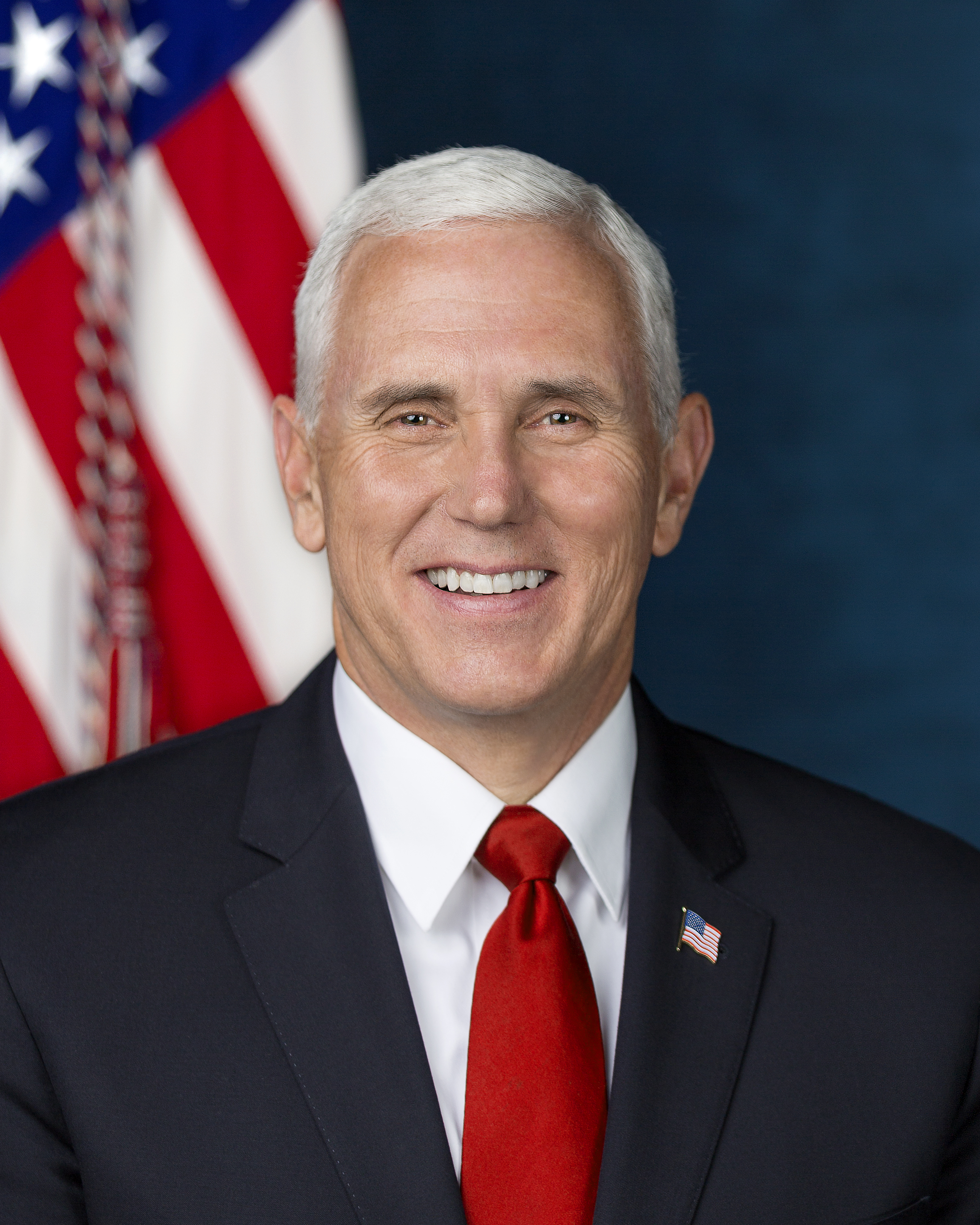
Mike Pence, former Vice President of the United States

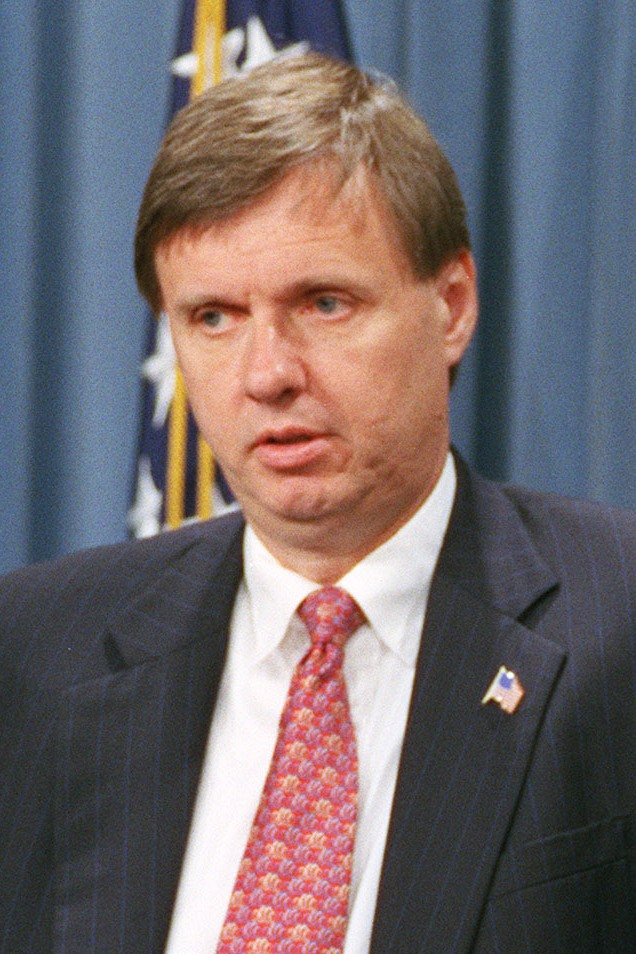
Timothy Muris, former chairman, Federal Trade Commission

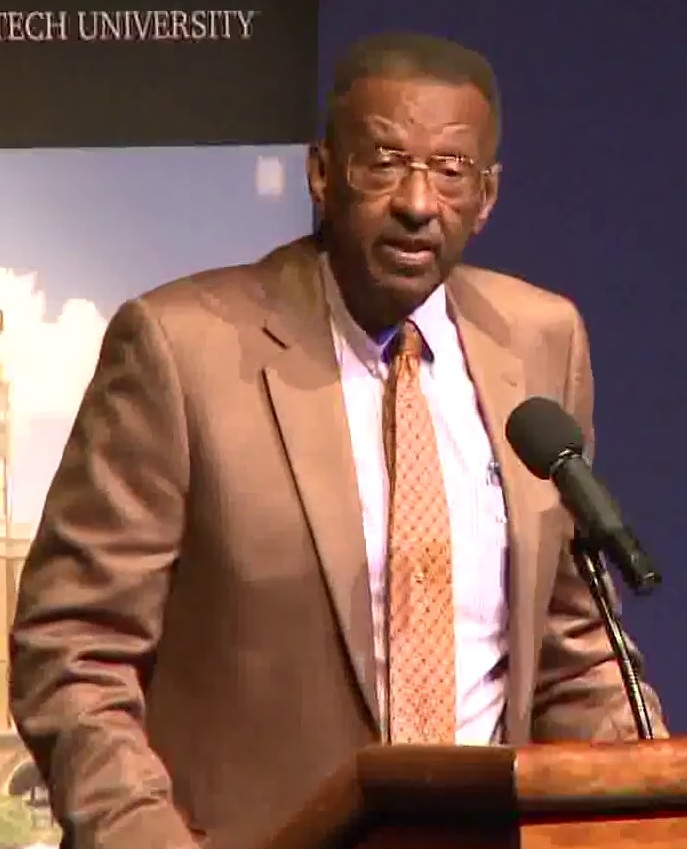
Walter E. Williams, John M. Olin Distinguished Professor of Economics and author

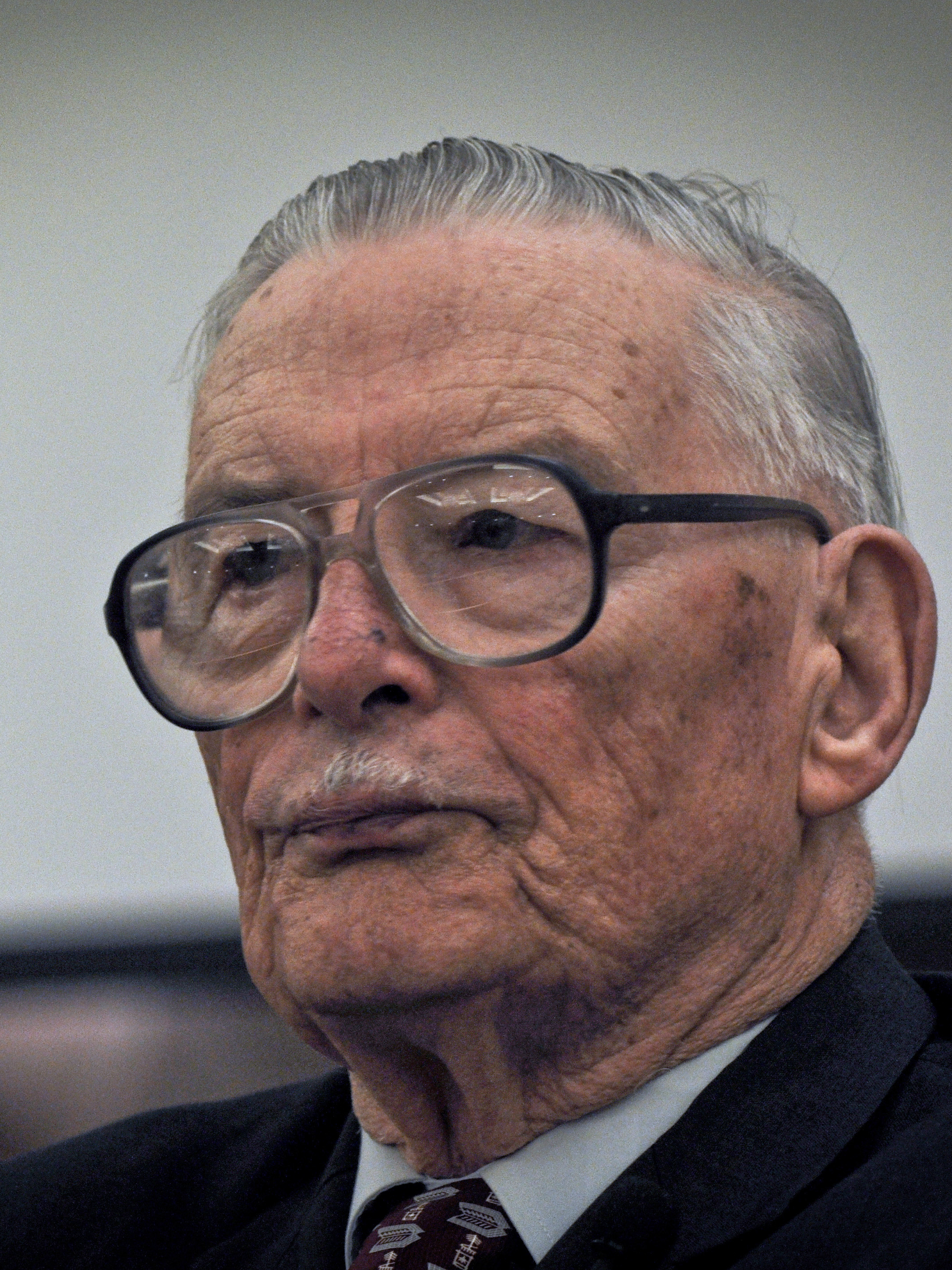
James M. Buchanan, former Nobel Prize-winning economist

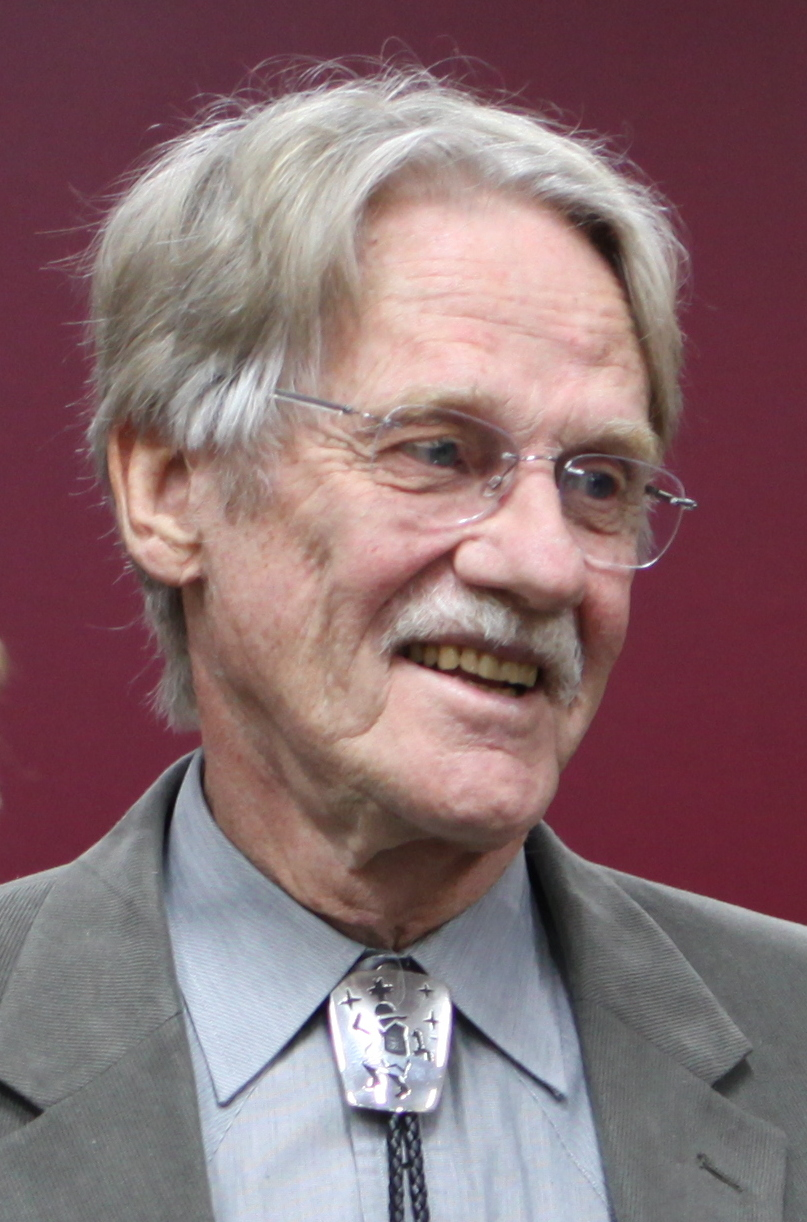
Vernon L. Smith, Nobel Prize-winning economist

=== Alumni ===
Notable George Mason University alumni Include:

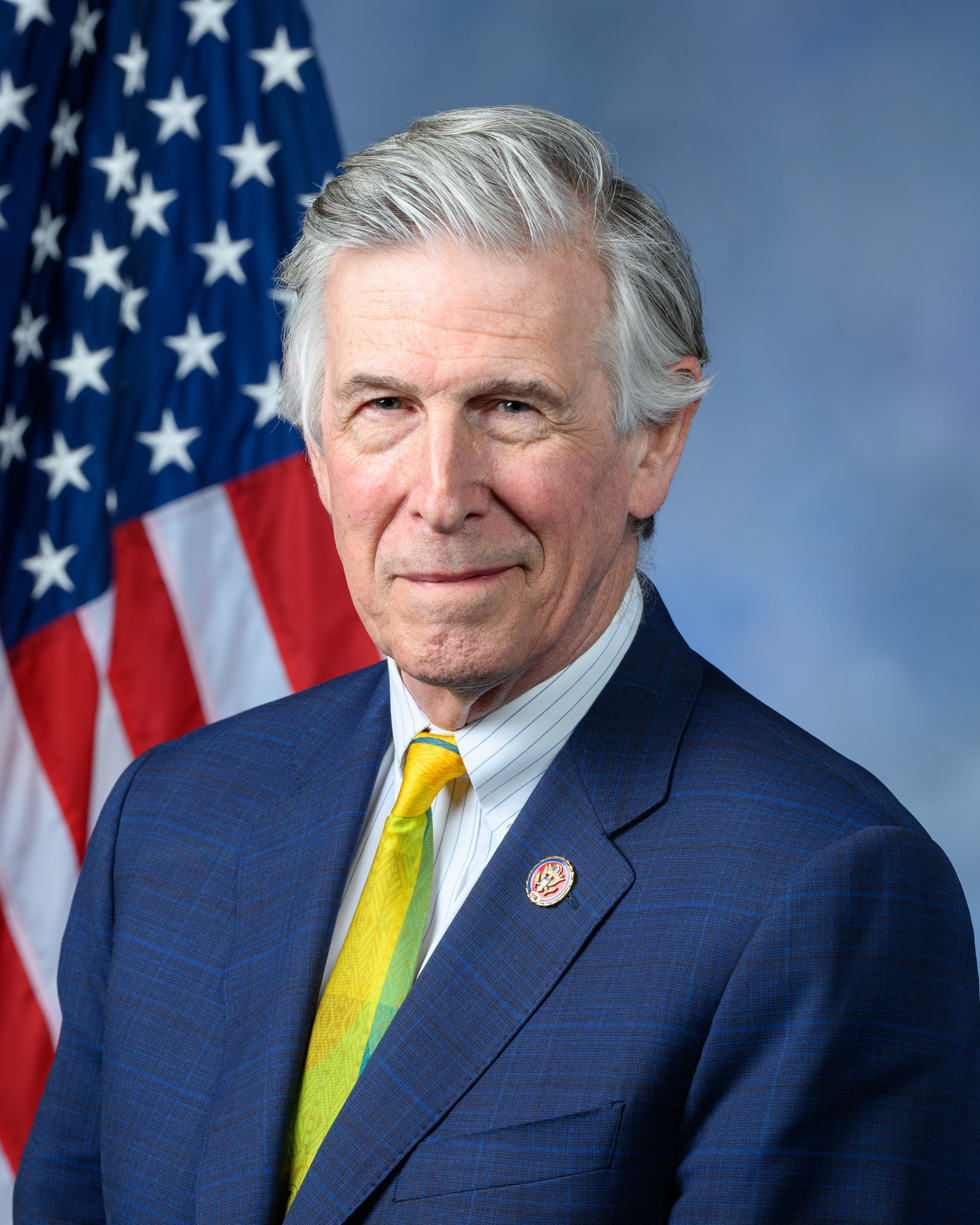
Don Beyer, Member of the U.S. House of Representatives from Virginia's 8th district.

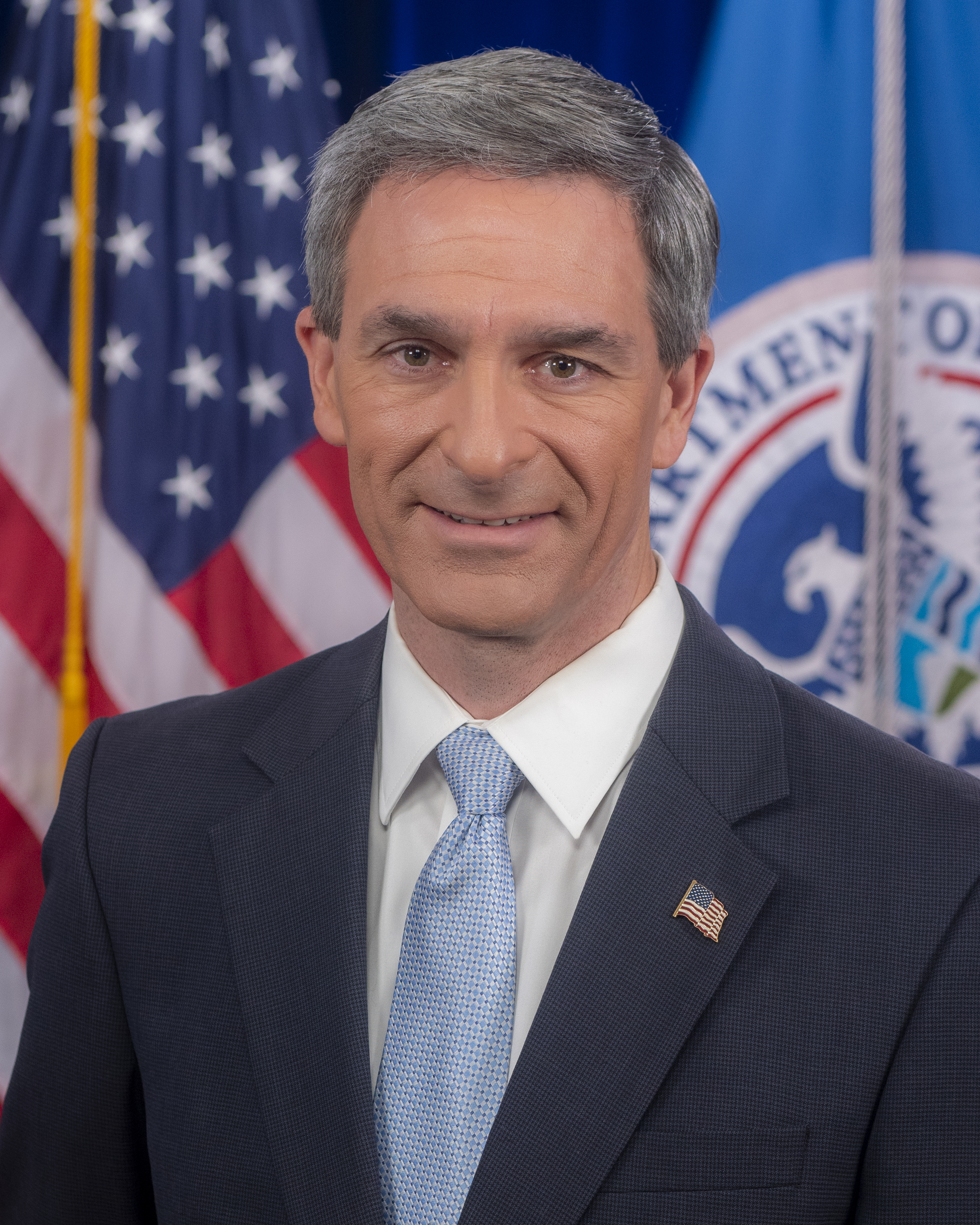
Ken Cuccinelli, former attorney general of Virginia and deputy secretary of Homeland Security

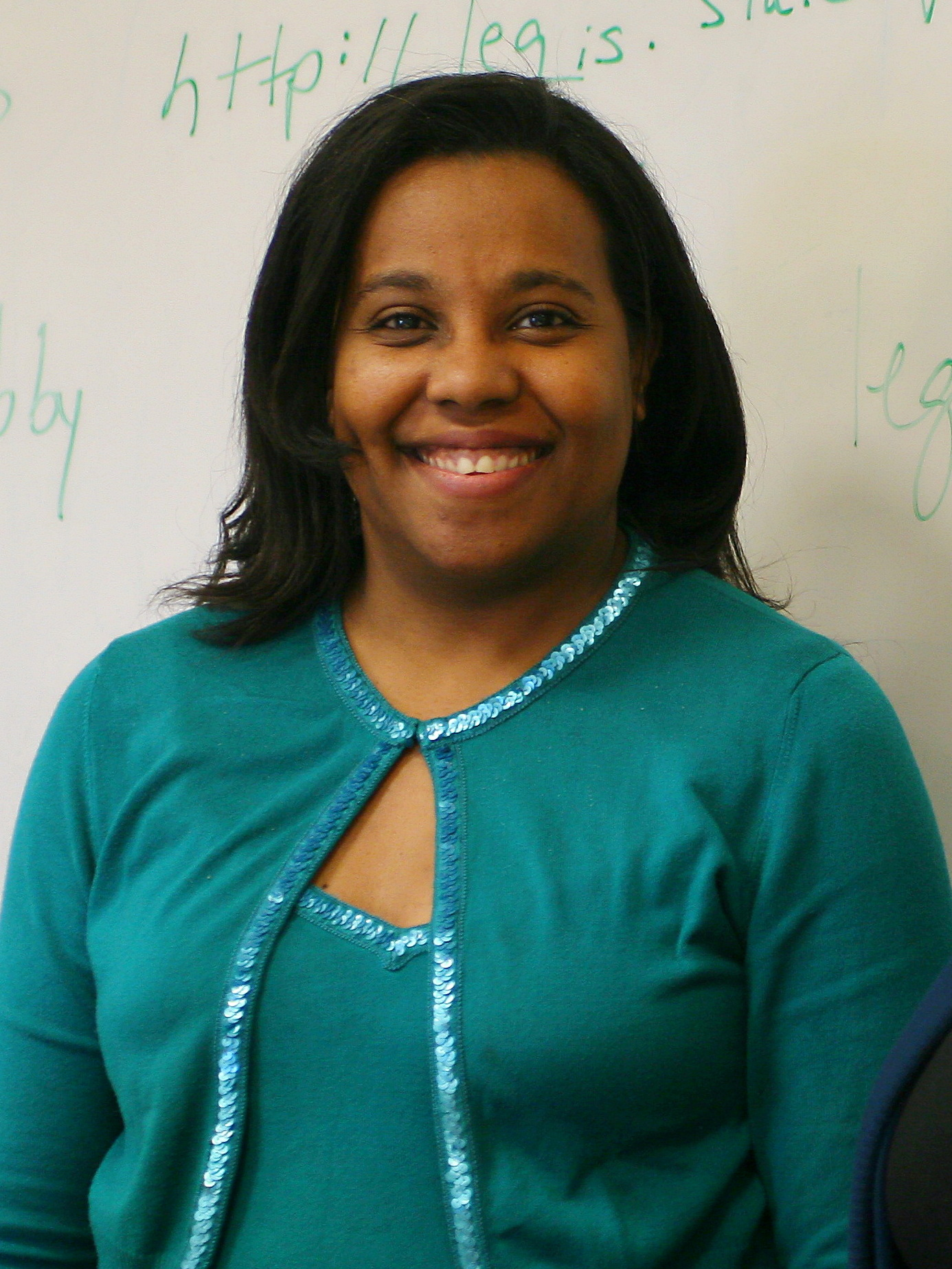
Charniele Herring, Majority Leader of the Virginia House of Delegates

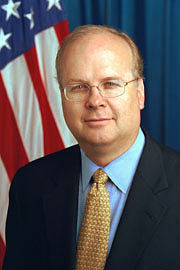
Karl Rove, senior advisor, President George W. Bush

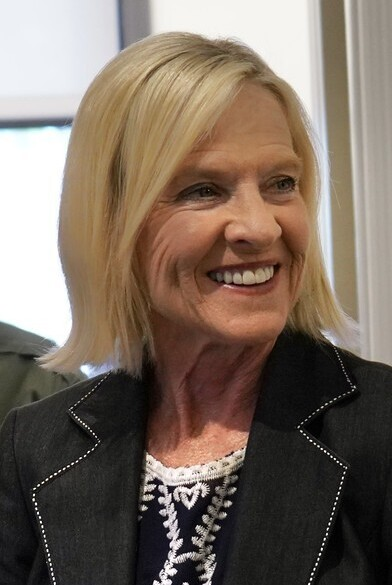
Bethany Hall-Long, former Governor of Delaware

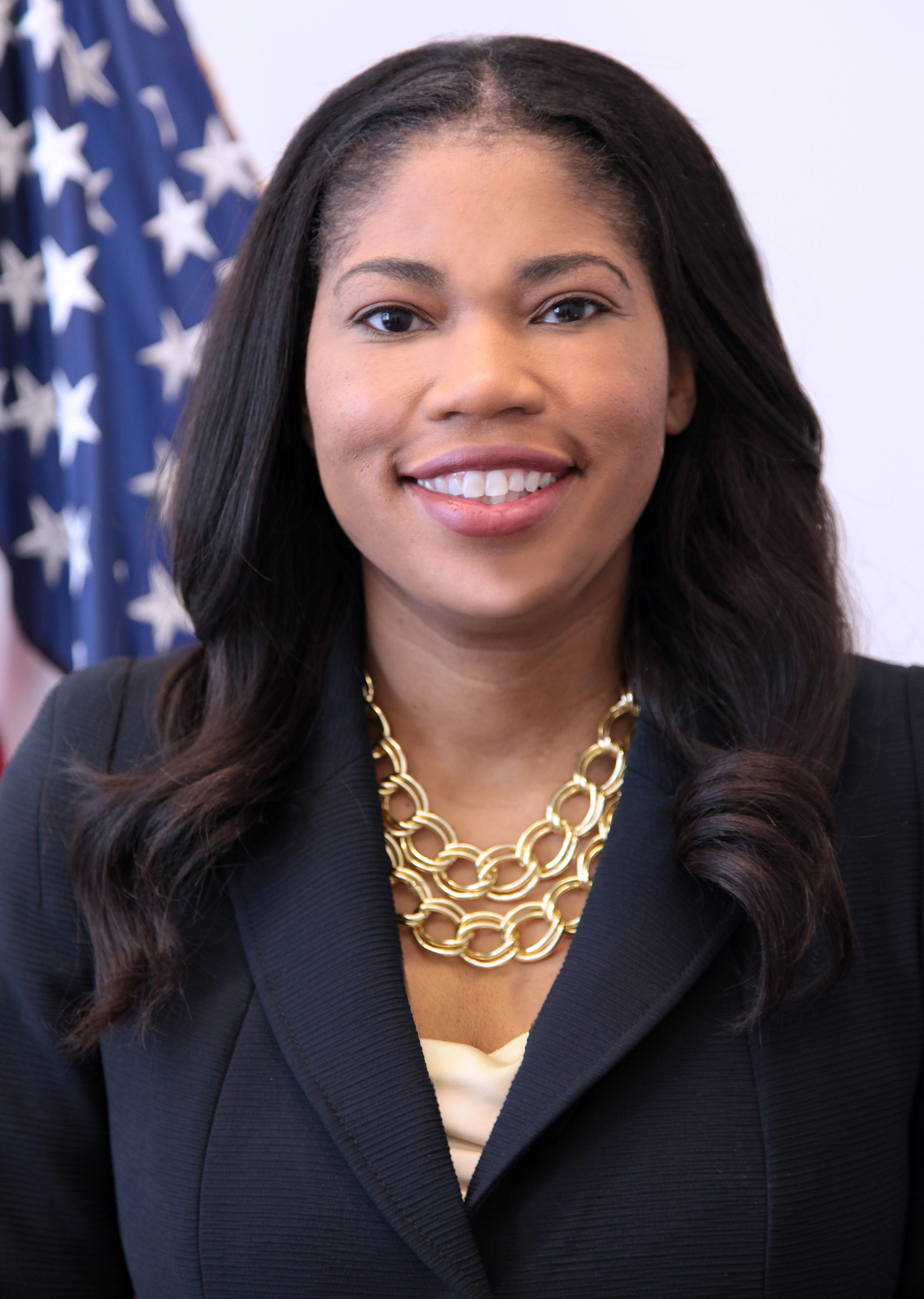
Denise Turner Roth, former administrator, General Services Administration

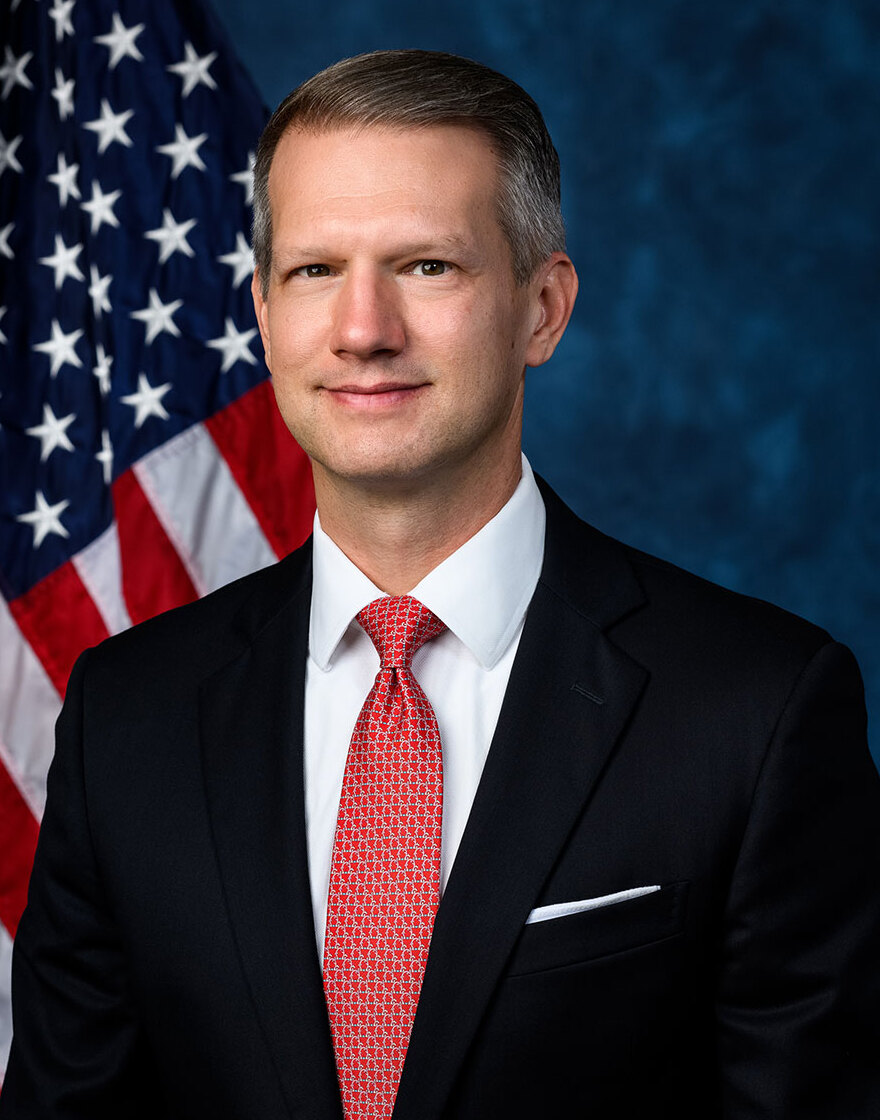
Riley Moore, Member of the U.S. House of Representatives from West Virginia's 2nd district

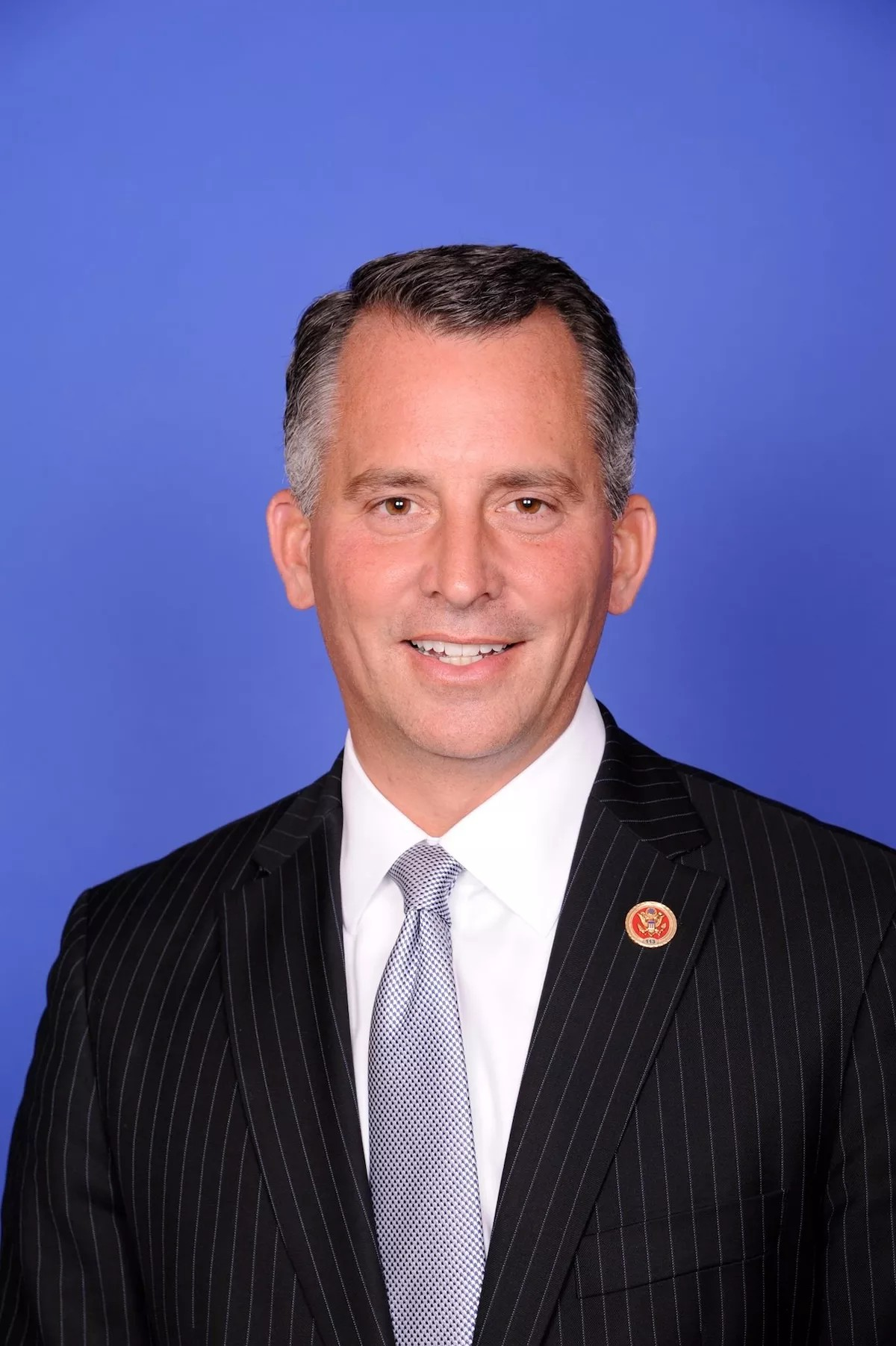
David Jolly, Member of the U.S. House of Representatives from Florida's 13th district

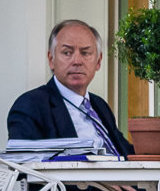
Steve Ricchetti, former Counselor to the President under President Joe Biden

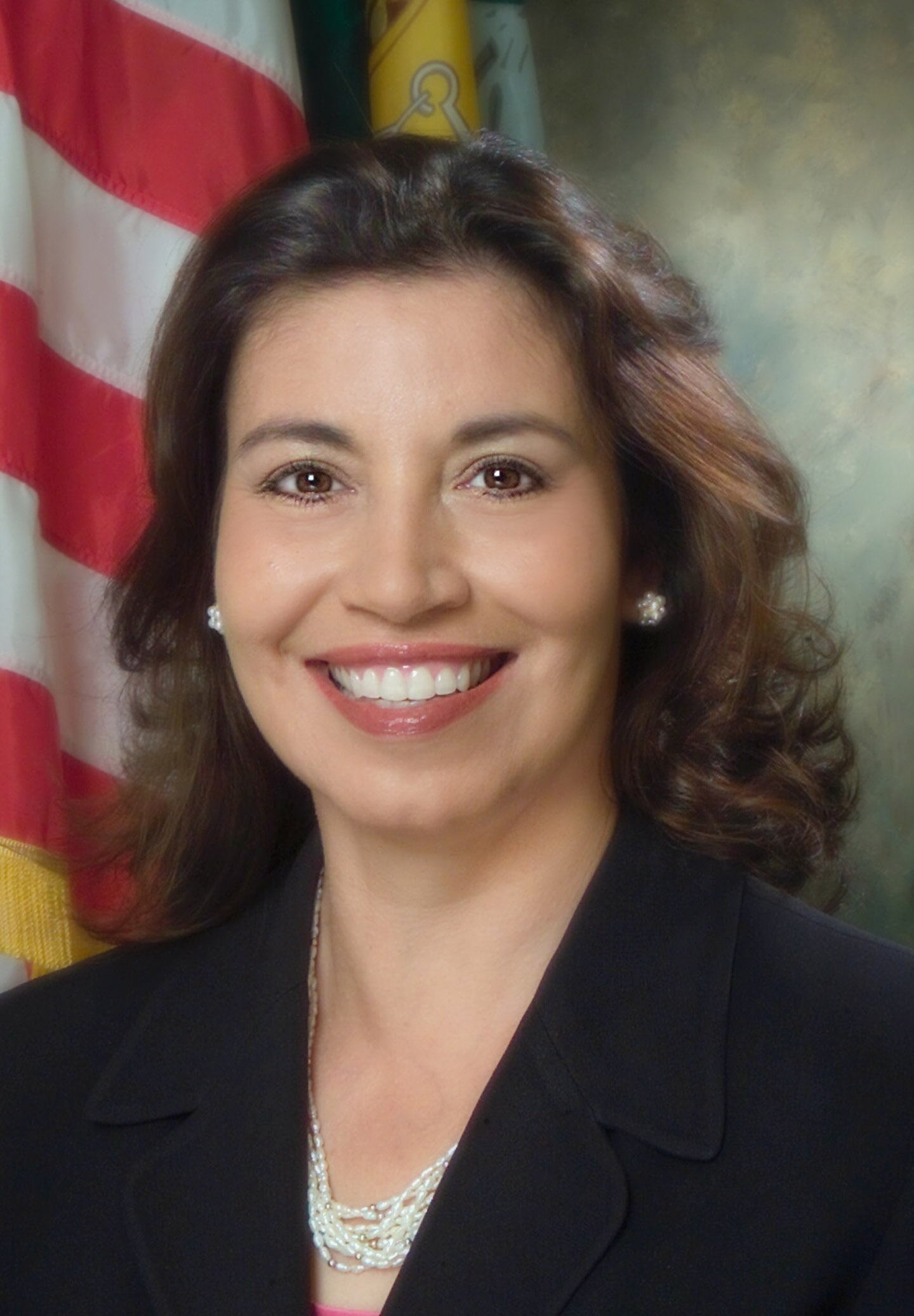
Anna Escobedo Cabral, former Treasurer of the United States

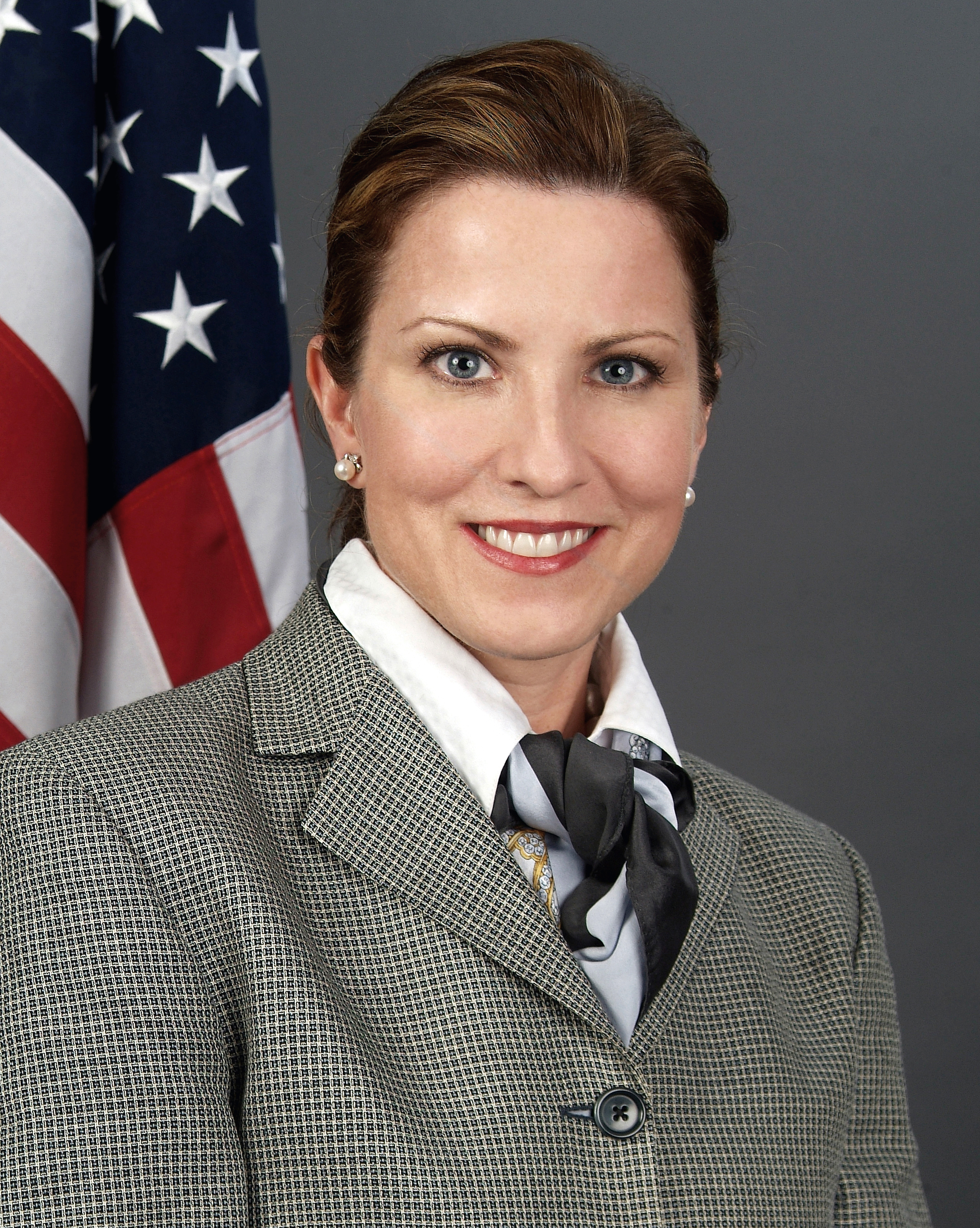
Kathleen L. Casey, former commissioner, U.S. Securities and Exchange Commission

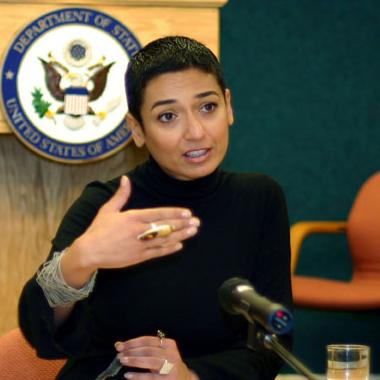
Zainab Salbi, former president of Women for Women International

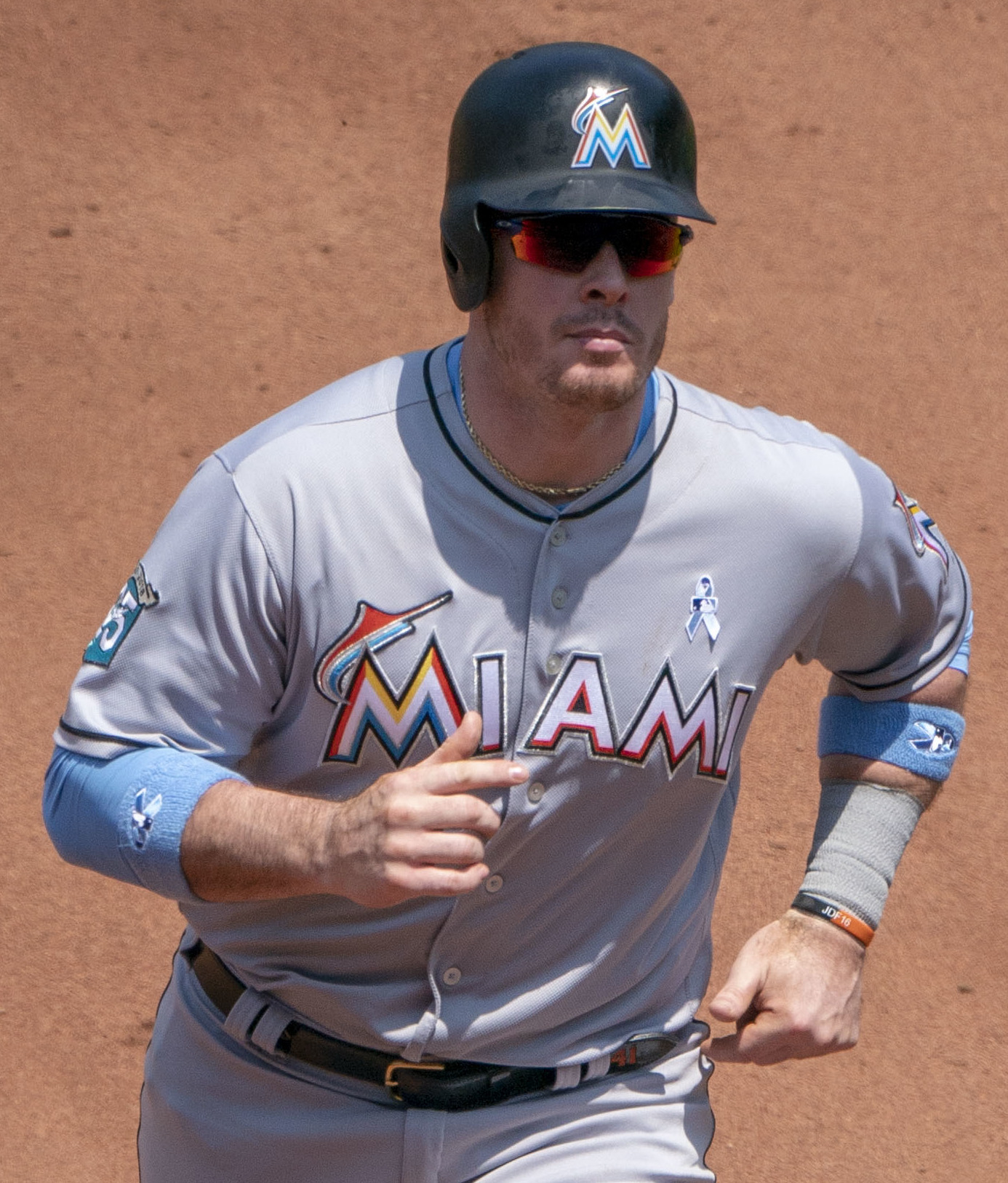
Justin Bour, former professional baseball player, Los Angeles Angels, Miami Marlins, and Philadelphia Phillies]

Carolyn Kreiter-Foronda, former poet laureate of Virginia

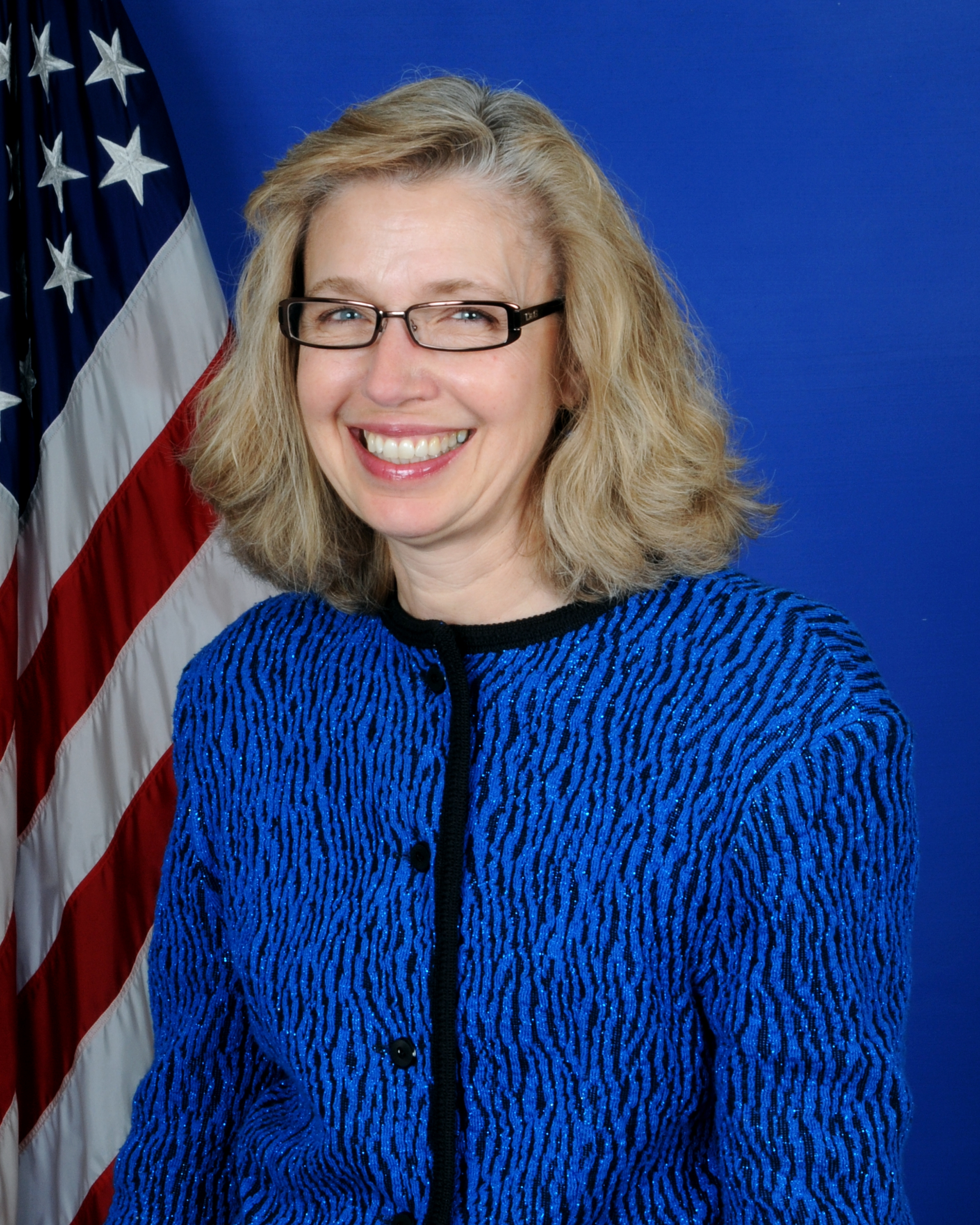
Christine Fox, former acting U.S. Deputy Secretary of Defense

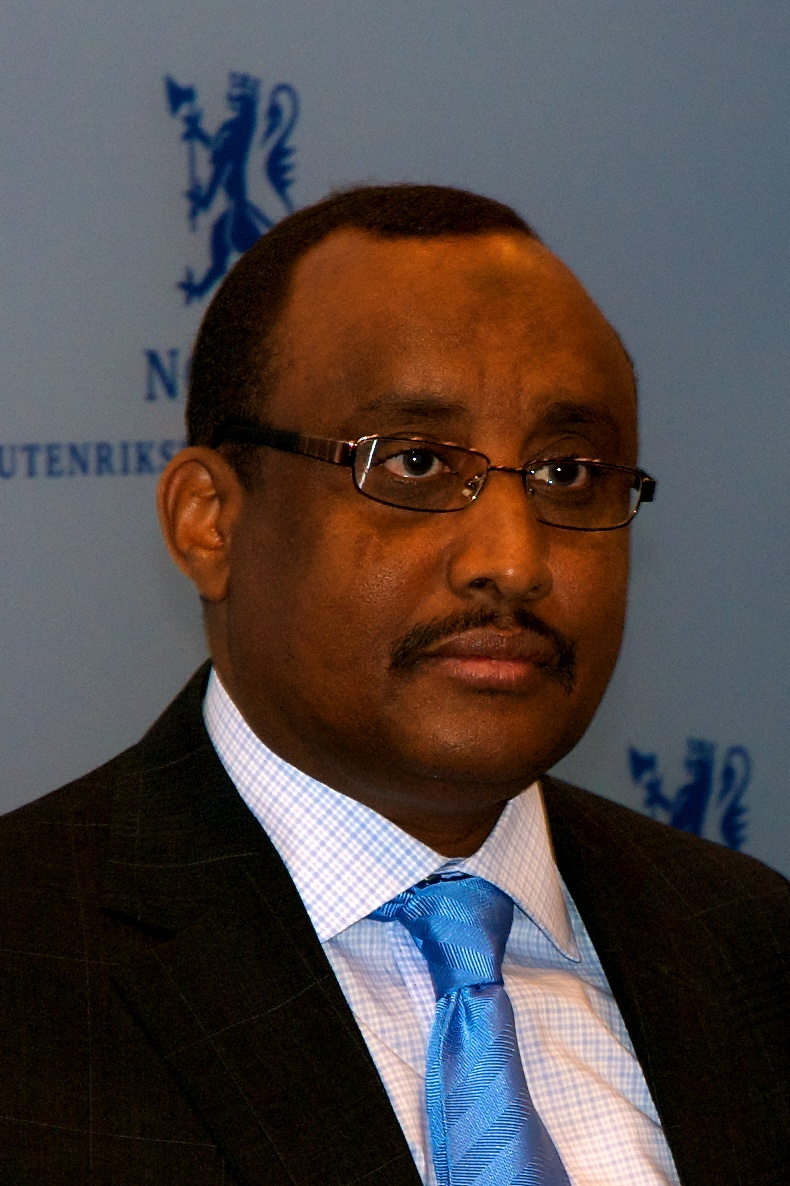
Abdiweli Gaas, former Prime Minister of Somalia

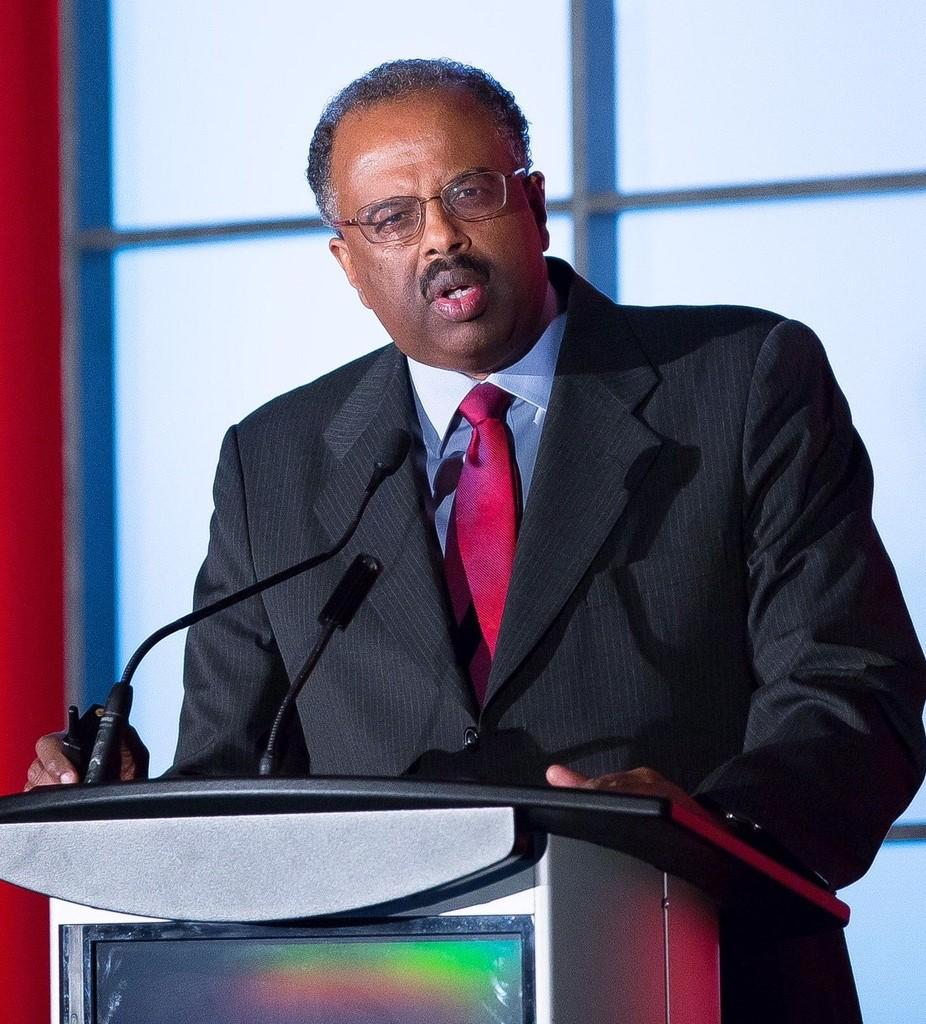
Abdirahman Mohamed Abdi Hashi, former Minister of Fisheries and Blue Economy in the Federal Government of Somalia.

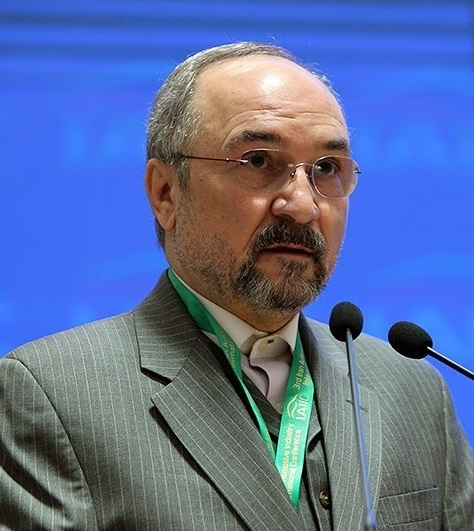
Mohammad Khazaee, former representative, Islamic Republic of Iran to the United Nations

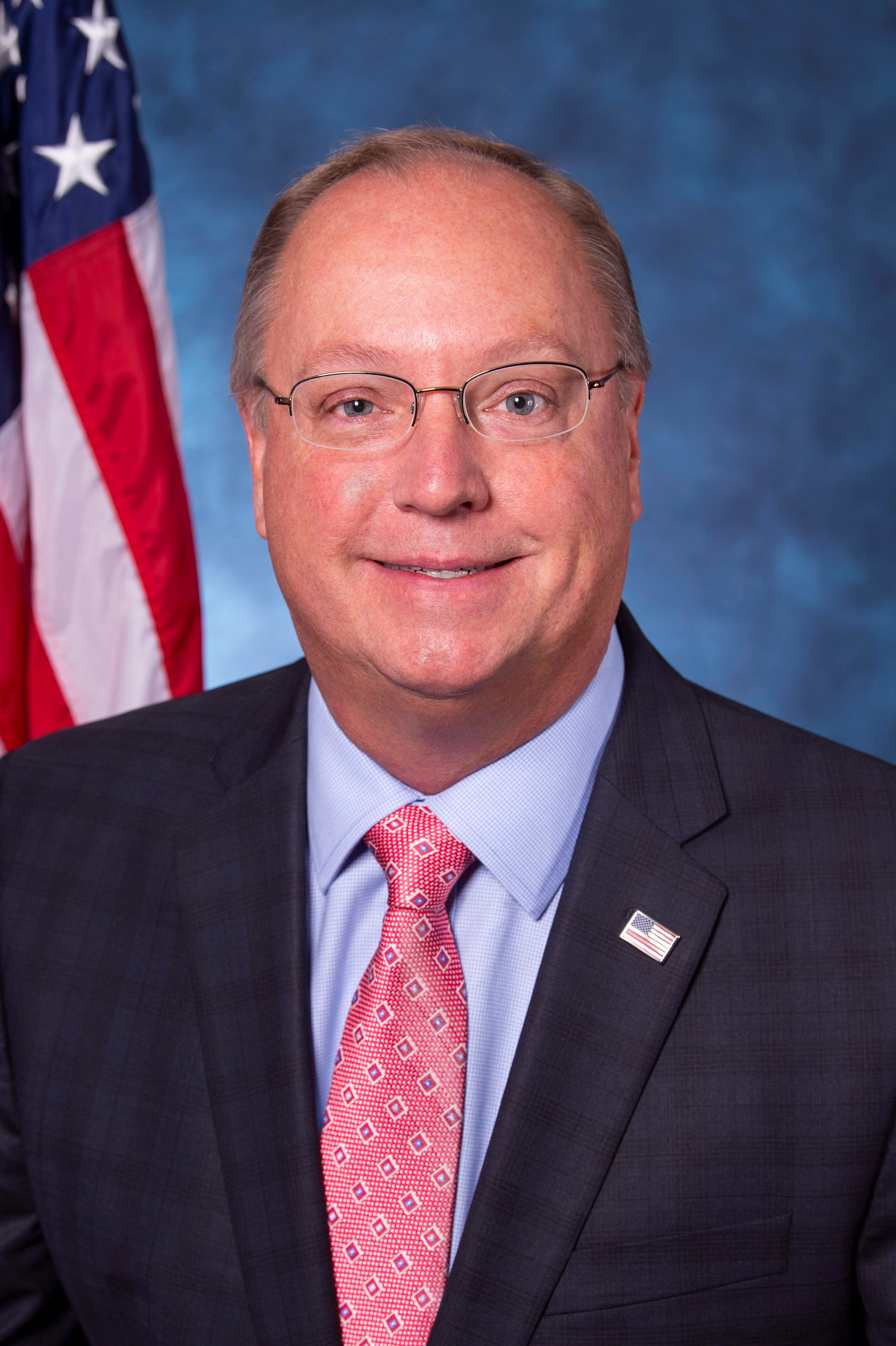
Jim Hagedorn, Member of the U.S. House of Representatives from Minnesota's 1st district

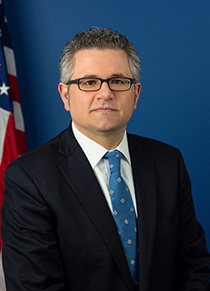
Mark A. Calabria, former Chief Statistician of the United States at the Office of Management and Budget (OMB), and former Director of the Federal Housing Finance Agency (FHFA)

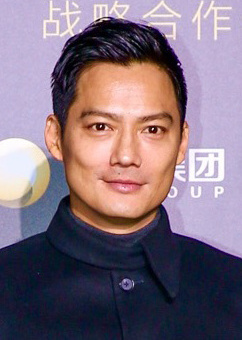
Archie Kao, actor

== See also ==
- George Mason University's historical hoaxes
- Northern Virginia Community College
