= George Mason University's historical hoaxes =

Hoaxes instigated by T. Mills Kelly

Students of George Mason University, as part of T. Mills Kelly's course, "Lying About the Past", created two popular Internet hoaxes: the "Edward Owens hoax", and the "Reddit serial killer hoax". The goal of the course was the creation of a widespread Internet deception. As Kelly stated in the course's syllabus:

What's our goal? Buzz, of course! Viral! We want our hoax to be picked up and spread around the Internet like wildfire!

== Edward Owens hoax ==
The Edward Owens hoax was a historical hoax created by students at George Mason University in 2008 as a class project for "Lying About the Past". The students created a website and a fictitious entry on English Wikipedia about Edward Owens, purportedly a Virginia oyster fisherman born in 1853 who became a pirate.

=== Hoax description ===
Students published a blog and videos about the fictional Owens, created by the fictional student "Jane Browning". The blog asserted that Owens fell on hard times during the Long Depression of the 1870s and took up piracy in Chesapeake Bay to survive. The students wrote that he robbed smaller commercial vessels and wealthy pleasure boaters from Maryland, threatening his victims with a punt gun. The class created a fake will, stating that Owens and his crew eventually went back to oyster fishing. The students later created a hoax biography of Owens on Wikipedia.

After some media outlets and academics reported the hoax as factual, the class divulged the hoax.

== Reddit serial killer hoax ==
The Reddit serial killer hoax was a second historical hoax perpetrated by "Lying about the past" class members. Unlike the Owens hoax, this one quickly failed. In 2012, Kelly taught the course for a second time in a similar format. The Reddit hoax, about an alleged serial killer named Joseph Scafe, was launched on the Reddit site on 28 April, and was first debunked in just over an hour.

=== Hoax description ===
The participating students created a sock puppet named Lisa Quinn, and under her name opened a Wordpress.com blog entitled: "I think my uncle was a serial killer." In her blog, Lisa wrote that she found some odd items in a Saratoga steamer trunk that she received upon the death of her grandparents. Lisa posted pictures of the trunk; ladies' shoes she presumably found inside the trunk; and newspaper clippings from 1895; one of which was about the murder of Alice Walsh—later identified as having been taken from the April 22, 1895, edition of The Evening World. According to Lisa's post, the trunk belonged to a relative, Joseph Scafe, (also called 'Uncle Joe'), and that it contained—in a false panel—ladies' jewelry and a "disturbing" journal. Lisa supposedly wanted to know if—in the opinion of her readers—her uncle was a serial killer.

With a new sock puppet, DisturbedThrowaway, the students attempted to start the spread of the hoax with a posting of a question on AskReddit: "Do you think my uncle Joe was just weird or possibly a serial killer?". Through Reddit, the hoax was expected to spread. At first, the hoax aroused interest. Many posters requested more photos (which DisturbedThrowaway declined) and alluded to the commercial success the case could lead to. The name of Jack the Ripper was mentioned as well. Yet, within 26 minutes, suspicions were rising. DisturbedThrowaway, the poster of the question, claimed to have found the names of two victims, Alice Walsh and Diamond Flossie, in the documents she retrieved. She asked the redditors for assistance in research; however, a quick Wikipedia search brought forth information connected with the two names, and posters at the site wondered why DisturbedThrowaway had not performed such a simple search herself.

=== Discovery ===
Just over an hour after the initial posting, user HatesRedditors suggested that the post was viral marketing. He noted that the Wikipedia entries for the victims had been created within two weeks of the posting and the pictures in the articles looked faked. The students tried to keep the deception going for several weeks, but the story was exposed. On May 14, Kelly revealed the serial killer hoax on his blog.

== Aftermath ==
With the latest hoax exposed, Wikipedia deleted the two entries about Alice Walsh and Diamond Flossie which had been written by the students' sock puppets. The professor and students claimed that the subjects were factual, but Wikipedia found them to be of insufficient notability. Wikipedia administrators did raise questions about the course's situational ethics, as Kelly's class committed Wikipedia vandalism, possibly legitimizing actions of a similar nature.

Kelly did not express regret in this matter; "I don't think there were any real victims here", he blogged:

I will also continue to teach Lying About the Past. Given the ubiquitous nature of Wikipedia in the information landscape, I think it's fair to say that whenever I teach the course again, Wikipedia will be a part of it some way, some how.

== Results ==
Yoni Appelbaum wrote in The Atlantic an article, "How the Professor Who Fooled Wikipedia Got Caught by Reddit", in which he compared the serial killer hoax and the last pirate hoax. In his article, he hypothesized why the 2008 hoax was successful, while this hoax failed in minutes. One answer he suggested was that Wikipedia has a trusting community, while Reddit has a more critical and skeptical community.

In March 2013, Kelly announced that he would no longer be teaching the course, after the university did not make it a part of the regular curriculum of his department. However, as of February 2015, Kelly continues to delve into topics dealing with editing and/or manipulating Wikipedia in his digital history class at George Mason University.

== See also ==
- List of hoaxes
