= WGMU Radio =

College radio station at George Mason University

Coordinates: 38°39′47.6″N 77°18′27″W

- United States
- Broadcast area: Washington, D.C.

Programming
- Format: Alternative Rock, College, Talk

Ownership
- Owner: George Mason University

Links
- Webcast: WGMU Webstream
- Website: WGMU Online

WGMU Radio is a college radio station located on the Fairfax campus of George Mason University in Virginia, United States. It broadcasts a range of music, sports, news and talk.

== Location ==
The office is located at The HUB, and the studios and broadcasting facilities are located in the George W. Johnson Center on the bottom floor.

== History ==
WGMU was founded in 1981, at which point it had an AM signal. In 1999 WGMU applied with the FCC to get an FM licence but was unable to obtain it. At some point, the station stopped broadcasting over AM; WGMU is currently broadcast exclusively through the internet.

== Output ==
The station broadcasts live 24/7 featuring a wide range of programming, including local music, mainstream music, news, sports and talk programming. Interviews and in-studio sessions are done regularly with local bands. Due to its close proximity to Washington DC, political figures have appeared on the station.

WGMU streams on its website, on iTunes, on-campus television channel 8.2, TuneIn and RadioFlag through their iPhone/Android applications and websites.

=== Sport ===
Amongst its roles at the university, WGMU functions as the home station for the George Mason Patriots athletics team, who achieved international fame in the 2005-2006 season. The station broadcasts every home game for both the women's and men's teams as part of the Athletic Department's Go Mason Digital Network. Broadcasts begin 30 minutes before tip-off with Pride of the Patriots for the women's games and 45 minutes beforehand for the men's games with WGMU's own pre-game show.

=== Music ===
WGMU is also home to a wide variety of musical shows. In 2006, WGMU aired live call-ins with such artists such as Thomas Dolby, Necro, New Riders of the Purple Sage's Ronnie Penque, Giddle Partridge, and Deep Red. In 2007, WGMU invited Virginia-based artists and bands such as Dermaptera, guitarist Phil Venable (The Venables, Crankcase), ukulele player/singer Mike Ratel, guitarist Wes Howard, and Sansyou up for on air concerts. In 2010-2011 they interviewed notable people such as Jimmy Fallon, Russell Brand, Keith Morrison, Presidential Candidate and former Governor of New Mexico Gary Johnson and original MTV VJ and current Sirius XM Radio 80s on 8 host Nina Blackwood. In 2013, WGMU interviewed Workaholics actor Erik Griffin, former pop star Aaron Carter, musician Claude Von Stroke, Former Washington Commanders defensive end Renaldo Wynn and personalities from USA Network and WWE. In 2017 the WGMU show Something Different interviewed Gwar member Sleazy P. Martini; in 2019 they interviewed Jodi Eichelberger of LazyTown fame for their puppetry special. In 2024, Amal Qazi interviewed the artist Oliver Tree.

== Management ==
The longtime faculty adviser is Professor Rodger Smith, who is an alum of the university.

WGMU contributes to listings published by the media company Spinitron.
