= Graves (surname) =

Graves is a surname of English origin. Its distribution within England is centered on Lincolnshire, followed in concentration by Lancashire, Yorkshire, Cumbria, and East Anglia. The surname is likely a variant of Grave with genitival or post-medieval excrescent -s. The surname Grave seems to have its possible origins in: 1. "Occupational name from Middle English greyve, grayve, greve 'steward bailif, manorial officer who managed the lord's demesne farm, headman of a town or village', a borrowing from Old Scandinavian greifi 'earl, count". 2. "Locative name from Middle English grave "pit" (Old English graef)". 3. "Relationship name (in Norfolk), possibly from the rare Middle English personal name Gre(y)vy, Gre(i)ve, Old Scandinavian Greifi, *Grefe, originally a nickname meaning 'earl, count".

The name likely seems to be of Scandinavian origin within England, as suggested by its distribution which corresponds largely to counties of the former Danelaw. This suggests its most common origin being that of an occupational surname, as the Grave is the Norse derived Danelaw (from the Old Norse greifi) counterpart to the Old English Reeve (from the Old English ġerēfa).

Bearers of the surname Graves most commonly belong to haplogroups R1b-U106, R1b-P312, I1, and I2. Lines have also been identified as belonging to E, J, R1a, and Q.

== Notable bearers ==
- A. J. Graves (born 1985), American basketball player
- Aaron Graves (born 2003), American football player
- Adam Graves (born 1968), Canadian ice hockey player
- Adelia Cleopatra Graves (1821–1895), American educator and author
- Albinus Peter Graves (1887–1964) American Christian Brother and missionary
- Alfred Perceval Graves (1846–1931), Anglo-Irish poet
- Algernon Graves (1845–1922), British art historian and art dealer
- Allen Graves (born 2006), American basketball player
- Alvin C. Graves (1909–1965), American nuclear physicist
- Amy Graves, American physics educator
- Bau Graves, American musician and musicologist
- Bibb Graves (1873–1942), American politician
- Bill Graves (born 1953), American politician
- Bob Graves (footballer) (1942–2021), English footballer
- Carie Graves (1953–2021), American rower
- Cecil Graves (1892–1957), Joint Director-General of the BBC
- Charles Graves (disambiguation), several people
- Clare W. Graves (1914–1986), American psychologist
- Clotilde Graves (1863–1932), Irish and play writer author
- Corey Graves (born 1984), American professional wrestling commentator
- D. V. Graves (Dorsett Vandeventer Graves, 1886–1960), American sports coach
- Danny Graves (born 1973), American baseball player
- Danny Graves (racing driver) (1924–1965), American racing driver.
- David Graves, Israeli senior Lecturer in Art and Philosophy
- Denyce Graves (born 1964), American mezzo-soprano opera singer
- Dick Graves (1912–1990), American businessperson
- Dixie Bibb Graves (1882–1965), American politician
- Don Graves, American lawyer
- Donald Graves (disambiguation), several people
- Earl G. Graves Jr. (born 1962), American basketball player
- Earl G. Graves Sr. (1935–2020), American businessman
- Ed Graves (1917–1980), American art director
- Edward O. Graves (1843–1909), American banker
- Ernest Graves (actor) (1919–1983), American actor
- Ernest Graves Jr. (1924–2019), United States Army general
- Ernest Graves, Sr. (1880–1953), United States Army general
- Evelyn Graves, 9th Baron Graves (1926–2002), Irish noble
- Ezra Graves (1809–1883), New York judge and politician
- Frank Graves (disambiguation), several people
- Frederick Graves (1858–1940), American missionary and bishop
- Garret Graves (born 1972), American politician
- George Graves (actor) (1876–1949), English comic actor
- George Graves (biologist) (1784–1839), English naturalist
- George S. Graves (1820–1902), American politician
- Harmon S. Graves (1870–1940), American football player, coach, and lawyer
- Henry Graves (disambiguation), several people
- Howard D. Graves (1939–2003), United States Army general
- James Graves (disambiguation), several people
- Jason Graves, American composer
- Jerry Graves (1938–2021), American basketball player
- Jim Graves (born 1953), American hotelier and political candidate
- John Graves (disambiguation), several people
- Joseph L. Graves Jr. (born 1955), American scientist
- Josh Graves (1927–2006), American bluegrass musician
- Keara Graves (born 1999), Canadian YouTuber
- Kelly Graves (born 1963), American basketball coach
- Kersey Graves (1813–1883), American philosopher
- Kyle Graves (born 1989), Canadian gridiron football player and coach
- Leonard Graves (1927–2000), American actor and singer
- Leslie Graves (1959–1995), American actress
- Lucia Graves (born 1943), English writer and translato
- Lulu Grace Graves (1874–1949), American dietitian
- L. C. Graves (1918–1995), American police detective
- Marion Coats Graves (1885–1962), American educator
- Mary H. Graves (1839–1908), American minister, literary editor, writer
- Matthew Graves (born 1974), American basketball player and coach
- Michael Graves (disambiguation), several people
- Michale Graves (born 1975), American singer
- Milford Graves (1941–2021), American jazz drummer and percussionist
- Morris Graves (1910–2001), American painter
- Nancy Graves (1939–1995), American painter and sculptor
- Nell Cole Graves (1908–1997), American artist
- Nelson Graves (1880–1918), American cricketer
- Nelson Z. Graves (1849–1930), American businessman
- Paul D. Graves (1907–1972), New York politician and judge
- Peter Graves (disambiguation), several people
- Philip Graves (1876–1953), Anglo-Irish journalist and writer
- Ralph Graves (1900–1977), American screenwriter, film director and actor
- Ralph Graves (writer) (1924–2013), American writer
- Randall Graves (1792–1831), American politician
- Ray Graves (1918–2015), American football player and coach
- Richard Graves (disambiguation), several people
- Robert Graves (disambiguation), including "Rob", several people
- Roosevelt Graves, American blues guitarist and singer
- Ross Graves (1874–1940), New York politician
- Rupert Graves (born 1963), English actor
- Ryan Graves (disambiguation), several people
- Sam Graves (born 1963), American politician
- Samuel Graves (1713–1787), Royal Navy admiral
- Samuel Robert Graves (1818–1873), British politician
- Steve Graves (born 1964), Canadian ice hockey player
- Teresa Graves (1948–2002), American actress
- Terrence C. Graves, American marine
- Thomas Graves (disambiguation), including "Tom", several people
- Todd Graves (attorney), American lawyer
- Valerie Graves (1958–2013), English murder victim
- White Graves (born 1942), American football player
- William Graves (disambiguation), including "Bill", several people

== Fictional characters ==
- Agent Graves, fictional character from 100 Bullets
- David Graves (character), comics character
- Gustav Graves, villain in the James Bond film Die Another Day
- Mercy Graves, DC Comics character
- Nathan Graves, fictional character, Castlevania: Circle of the Moon
- Randal Graves, fictional character in Clerks
- Phillip Graves, a fictional character in the video game Call of Duty: Modern Warfare II
- Malcolm Graves, a playable character in the online arena game League of Legends
- Lincoln Graves, a playable character in the video game Conflict: Denied Ops
- Percival Graves, fictional character in Fantastic Beasts and Where to Find Them
- Andrew and Ashley Graves, two playable characters in the video game The Coffin of Andy and Leyley
- Skully J. Graves, a Halloween event character from the video game Disney Twisted-Wonderland

== See also ==
- Baron Graves
- Graves Brothers, American gospel musicians
- Graves disease, named after Robert James Graves
- Ruth Graves Wakefield née Graves (1903–1977), American chef and inventor
- Shakey Graves aka Alejandro Rose-Garcia (1987–living), American Americana musician
