= The Golden Rooster (artwork) =

Sculpture of a solid gold rooster

- The Rooster on display at the Sparks Nugget casino
- Artist: Frank Polk (artist)
- Year: 1957
- Medium: 18-carat gold
- Movement: Realism
- Subject: Rooster
- Dimensions: 23 cm (9 in)
- Weight: 255 oz (15.9 lb)
- Designation: Art (declared in 1962)
- Condition: Mint
- Owner: Dick Graves; Currently Unknown

The Golden Rooster is a solid gold rooster, commissioned by Dick Graves for display in a restaurant at his casino. The statue attracted attention for the controversy over its status as an artwork.

== History ==
Richard L. Graves, known as the owner of the Nugget Casino Resort in Sparks, Nevada commissioned artist Frank Polk to create a solid gold statue of a rooster for display in a restaurant that he was having built, the Golden Rooster Room, featuring fried chicken supposedly made using Colonel Sanders' original recipe. It was cast by Shreve & Company. The final piece was 23 cm (9 in) tall and composed of 18-carat gold (then worth about $40,000 and equivalent to $447,820 in 2024). It was installed in May 1958.

In July 1960, the statue was confiscated by the federal government, who deemed it to be for the purpose of advertising, rather than an artwork, thus violating the Gold Reserve Act. Graves was sued by the Treasury Department over his perceived violation of the act. He applied for bail for the rooster, but it was denied.

Graves had a bronze replica of the rooster dressed in prison stripes made and displayed outside the casino restaurant.

In September 1960, Graves sold the casino to John Ascuaga, his General Manager.

On March 26, 1962, in Carson City, the case (United States of America v. One Solid Gold Object in Form of a Rooster) went to trial before Judge Sherrill Halbert. The trial had been previously set for October, 1961, but was delayed. He was represented by Paul Laxalt. The government’s attorney was Thomas Wilson. After listening to expert testimony, the jury found him not guilty after a days deliberations and that the statue was an artwork, making it exempt from the act. The statue was returned and placed on display again.

An appeal was filed, on the belief that the rooster would eventually be melted down and recast as bullion for sale abroad. It was ultimately dropped.

The statue was on display until 1986 when the Golden Rooster Room (under the name El Gallo de Oro) was closed for renovations to accommodate an expansion of Trader Dick's. It remained in a case in the casino until July 2014 when it was sold for $234,000 (equivalent to $310,805 in 2024) at the Coeur d'Alene Art Auction at the Peppermill Resort Spa Casino.
