= Bob Graves =

Bob Graves may refer to:

- Bob Graves (footballer) (1942–2021), English footballer for Lincoln City
- Bob Graves (rugby union) (1909–1990), Irish rugby union international

== See also ==
- Bob Greaves (1934–2011), English journalist and broadcaster
- Robert Graves (disambiguation)
