= Ernest Graves =

Ernest Graves may refer to:

- Ernest Graves (actor) (1919–1983), American actor
- Ernest Graves Jr. (1924–2019) United States military officer
- Ernest Graves Sr. (1880–1953), United States military officer and college football coach, father of previous
