= General Graves =

General Graves may refer to:

- Azariah Graves (1768–1850), North Carolina militia general in the War of 1812
- Ernest Graves Sr. (1880–1953), U.S. Army brigadier general
- Ernest Graves Jr. (1924–2019), U.S. Army lieutenant general
- William S. Graves (1865–1940), U.S. Army major general
- Howard D. Graves (1939–2003), U.S. Army lieutenant general
- Richard G. Graves (born 1933), U.S. Army lieutenant general

== See also ==
- Ivan Grave (1874–1960), Soviet Army major general
- General Graves B. Erskine (1897–1973)
