= Robert Graves (disambiguation) =

Robert Graves (1895–1985) was an English poet, translator and novelist.

Robert, Bob, or Rob Graves may also refer to:

- Robert Graves (engraver) (1798–1873), English engraver
- Robert Graves (rugby) (1883–1958), Australian rugby player
- Robert Edmund Graves (1835–1922), English librarian
- Robert James Graves (1796–1853), Irish surgeon
- Robert Muir Graves (1930–2003), American landscape architect
- Robert Perceval Graves (1810-1893), Irish biographer and Anglican priest
- Bob Graves (footballer) (Robert Edward Graves, 1942–2021), English football goalkeeper
- Rob Graves (guitarist) (1955–1990), American guitarist and bassist
- Rob Graves (Robert Douglas Graves, born 1973), American musician

== See also ==
- Robert Grave (died 1600), English priest
