= Peter Graves (disambiguation) =

Peter Graves (1926–2010) was an American actor.

Peter or Pete Graves may also refer to:

- Peter Graves, 8th Baron Graves (1911–1994), English actor and peer
- Peter Graves (announcer) (born 1952), American TV sportscaster and skiing coach
- Peter Graves (cricketer) (born 1946), English cricketer
- Peter Graves (motorcyclist) (born 1966), British motorcycle road racer
- Peter Graves (rower) (born 1984), American Olympic rower
- Peter D. Graves (living), American film producer
- Pete Graves (born 1982), British TV presenter

== See also ==
- Peter Graves Orchestra
- Writing career of William Pènedu Bois for the novel Peter Graves
