= Rogers Birnie =

United States Army officer and explorer

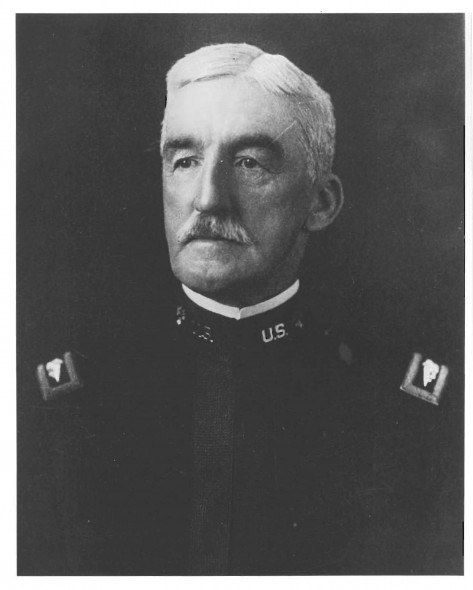
- Born: 5 April 1851; Taneytown, Maryland
- Died: 25 September 1939 (aged 88); Washington, D.C.
- Relatives: Ernest Graves Sr. (son-in-law); Ernest Graves Jr. (grandson)
- Military career
- Allegiance: United States
- Branch: United States Army
- Service years: 1872–1915
- Rank: Colonel
- Conflicts: Spanish–American War

Rogers Birnie (5 April 1851 – 25 September 1939) was a United States Army officer and explorer of Death Valley.

== Biography ==
Rogers Birnie was born in Taneytown, Maryland, on 5 April 1851. He grew up in Taneytown, and could hear the guns from his house during the Battle of Gettysburg during the American Civil War. He graduated first in the West Point class of 1872 and was commissioned in the Infantry. He immediately reported to the 13th Infantry at Fort Douglas near Salt Lake City. He joined the Wheeler Survey in 1874. During the survey that year, he found some Anasazi ruins which in the 20th century were made a UNESCO World Heritage Site. In 1875, he led an expedition from Los Angeles, over the San Gabriel Mountains, and through the Mojave Desert. During that same expedition, Birnie did the first scientific exploration of Death Valley before climbing Mount Whitney. Three subsequent years he led survey parties in Nevada, Idaho and New Mexico. He was one of the co-founders of the National Geographic Society in 1888, where he served as the first manager of the board of directors.

He transferred to the Ordnance Corps in 1878 and served at the West Point Foundry, Springfield Arsenal and Sandy Hook Proving Ground. He was instrumental in the introduction of steel-forged built-up guns for coastal artillery in the United States. He served as a Lieutenant Colonel of volunteers in Cuba during the Spanish–American War. As Chief Ordnance Officer of the Division of Cuba, he received transfer of armament and fortifications around Havana from the defeated Spanish. Birnie retired in 1915 and during World War I worked for the International Arms and Fuze Company. He died in Washington, D.C., on 25 September 1939.
