= Richard Graves (disambiguation) =

Richard Graves (1715–1804) was an English minister and writer.

Richard Graves may also refer to:

- Richard Graves (antiquary) (1677–1729), English antiquarian
- Richard Graves (theologian) (1763–1829), Irish theological scholar and priest
- Richard G. Graves (born 1933), American Army general
- Richard Harry Graves (1897–1971), Irish Australian writer
- Richard P. Graves (1906–1989), American businessman
- Richard Perceval Graves (born 1945), English biographer, poet and lecturer
- Dick Graves (Richard L. Graves, 1912-1990), American businessman
