= Henry Graves =

Henry Graves may refer to:

- Henry Graves (banker) (1868–1953), American banker and watch collector
- Henry Graves (printseller and publisher) (1806–1892), British printseller and publisher
- Henry Lee Graves (1813–1881), president of Baylor University
- Henry Richard Graves (1818–1882), English portrait painter
- Henry S. Graves (1871–1951), American conservationist and co-founder of the Yale School of Forestry

== See also ==
- Baron Graves for
  - Henry Cyril Percy Graves, 5th Baron Graves (1847–1914)
  - Henry Algernon Claude Graves, 7th Baron Graves (1877–1963)
