= United States v. One Solid Gold Object in Form of a Rooster =

1962 US federal civil forfeiture case

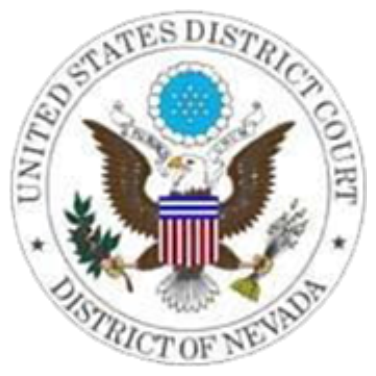
- Court: United States District Court for the District of Nevada
- Full case name: United States v. One Solid Gold Object in Form of a Rooster
- Argued: March 26, 1962
- Decided: June 28, 1962
- Citations: 208 F. Supp. 99 – Dist. Court, D. Nevada 1962

Court membership
- Judge sitting: Sherrill Halbert

United States v. One Solid Gold Object in Form of a Rooster (208 F. Supp. 99 – Dist. Court, D. Nevada 1962) is a United States District Court for the District of Nevada civil forfeiture case between the United States and The Golden Rooster, a solid gold statue of a rooster. As the rooster was made of solid gold, the United States Treasury seized it on the grounds that it was illegal under the Gold Reserve Act of 1934 which prohibited private ownership of more than 50 ozt (1.6 kg) of gold in the United States. The owner challenged the seizure in court and the jury found in favor of the owner.

The form of the styling of this case – the defendant being an object, rather than a legal person – is because this is a jurisdiction in rem (power over objects) case, rather than the more familiar in personam (over persons) case.

== Background ==
The gold rooster sculpture

Dick Graves, who ran the Sparks Nugget casino in Sparks, Nevada, came up with the idea for the statue. He thought that having a solid gold statue of a rooster on display would help to bring in people into a restaurant at his casino. He made a wooden model and telephoned the United States Mint in Washington, D.C., to ask them to make it in gold, but the Mint replied they could not manufacture it as they felt it was illegal for any individual to own sufficient gold to make it under the Gold Reserve Act. He eventually had it made in California with permission of the San Francisco Mint to melt down 300 ounces of 18-karat gold to make the statue.

The finished statue of 206.3 troy ounces (6,420 g) was installed in the casino in 1958. It was placed in the main dining room which became known as the "Golden Rooster Room". However, later in the year, the United States Secret Service told Graves the statue was illegal due to the gold in it. Graves hired Paul Laxalt, the future Governor of Nevada, as his attorney. Laxalt explained to the Treasury that they had been given permission to make the statue and the matter did not proceed. However, in 1960, United States Marshals raided the casino and seized the rooster statue.

== Case ==
Before the case went to court, there was a pre-trial hearing regarding points of law. Two points raised were; "Did the United States need to prove intent to violate the Gold Reserve Act to gain a warrant for seizure?", and "did the United States need to prove their case beyond reasonable doubt?". On both points, the judge ruled that intent was irrelevant in terms of getting a warrant, and because this was a civil case and not a criminal one, the government only needed to show a preponderance of evidence. The rooster was then held in a federal bank vault until the case was heard as the judge refused to grant bail to it. Whilst the golden rooster statue was in federal custody, Graves responded to the denial of release by placing a bronze copy of the rooster dressed in a striped prison uniform in his casino in the meantime.

The case was held in 1962 before a jury. Graves initially argued that the statue was art and was legal under the Gold Reserve Act. The government contested this, claiming that it was not a "customary use" for gold under Title 31 C.F.R. § 54.4(a)(9)(i) but eventually conceded it was art. However they argued because it was being used as an advertisement, it was actually a commercial instrument and made claims that, because it was more than 90 percent gold, it did not count as legally exempt "fabricated gold". Graves had art experts from New York and Denver testify to the artistic merits of the statue, with one saying that the rooster was "exquisite". The government argued that the rooster risked American economic security, citing the initial refusal of the mint to melt down the gold and Graves' evasive tactics in getting the authorization. They argued that if 1 in 180 Americans made similar gold objects, the United States would lose 25 percent of its gold reserves. Laxalt compared the case to a modern-day David and Goliath citing the government as Goliath making decisions without knowing what Nevadans experienced. He also stated that if the jury found against the statue, the rooster would have been melted down and placed in Fort Knox. The judge directed the jury to consider whether the creation of the statue was a customary artistic use for gold.

The jury found in favor of the rooster and its owner Graves. The judge summarized the jury's decision as the rooster having been made in good faith as a piece of art, rather than any attempt to hoard the gold. In response, the government petitioned the judge for a judgment notwithstanding verdict to overrule the jury's decision. The government lawyers also moved for a retrial on the grounds of misdirection of the jury and failure to allow witnesses, arguing that the ruling could result in people making 200 ounce golden steers. The judge denied both petitions, on the grounds that the regulations under Title 31 were referring to gold in general and that a large statue made of gold would negate the assumption of good faith that was presumed by the jury in this case. The government also argued that the court ruling was against the legislative intent of the Gold Reserve Act. The court replied that it was up to Congress to make their intent clear and that the enacted text was too vague to specifically target the statue just because it was made of gold.

== Aftermath ==
The statue was returned and remained at the casino until 2013 when the casino was sold. The statue was sold at an auction in 2014 for $234,000 ($318,239 in 2025).
