= James Graves =

James Graves may refer to:

- James Graves (antiquarian) (1815–1886), Irish antiquarian and archaeologist
- James Graves (New South Wales politician) (1882–1964), member of the New South Wales Legislative Council
- James Graves (sport shooter) (born 1963), American Olympic sport shooter
- James Graves (Victorian politician) (1827–1910), member of the Victorian Legislative Assembly for Delatite
- James E. Graves Jr. (born 1953), American judge
- James Robinson Graves (1820–1893), American Baptist preacher

== See also ==
- Jim Graves (born 1953), American hotel executive and political candidate
- Bau Graves aka James Graves (living), American musician, musicologist and arts activist
