= Charles Graves =

Charles Graves may refer to:

- Charles Graves (bishop) (1812–1899), Bishop of Limerick and mathematician
- Charles A. Graves (1850–1928), legal scholar and law professor
- Charles Burleigh Graves (1841–1912), Justice of the Kansas Supreme Court
- Charles E. Graves (1849–1928), American politician in the Virginia House of Delegates
- Charles H. Graves (Ohio politician) (1872–1940), Democratic politician in the U.S. state of Ohio
- Charles Hinman Graves (1839–1928), American politician
- Charles Patrick Graves (1899–1971), English writer, grandson of the bishop
