= John Graves =

John Graves may refer to:

- John Graves (American football) (born 1987), American football defensive tackle
- John Graves (author) (1920–2013), U.S. author
- John Graves (racing driver), American racing driver
- John Graves (rugby league) (1926–1983), Australian rugby league footballer
- John George Graves (1866–1945), English entrepreneur
- John T. Graves (1806–1870), Irish jurist and mathematician
- John Temple Graves (1856–1925), American politician
- John Thomas Graves (Confederate soldier) (1842–1950), last surviving Confederate soldier from the American Civil War
- John Woodcock Graves (1795–1886), Anglo-Australian composer and poet

Fictional characters

- John Graves, a fictional character in 15 Maiden Lane

== See also ==
- John Graves Simcoe (1752–1806), Canadian lieutenant governor
- Tom Graves aka John Thomas Graves Jr. (born 1970), American politician
- William Graves (judge) aka John William Graves (born 1935), American jurist from Kentucky
