= Vanessa Lee =

British singer and actress

- publicity shot
- Born: Winifred Ruby Moule; 18 June 1920; Streatham, London, UK
- Died: 15 March 1992 (aged 71); London, U.K.
- Occupations: Film actress, singer
- Spouse: Peter Graves, 8th Baron Graves (m. 1960–1992)

Vanessa Lee, Baroness Graves (18 June 1920 - 15 March 1992), born Winifred Ruby Moule, was a British actress and singer. She was known for her appearances in Ivor Novello's musicals, especially after the Second World War. She was the leading lady in Ivor Novello's smash hit 'The King's Rapsody' from 1949–51, when Ivor who basically 'discovered' her died soon after the performance in February 1951. It was Novello who suggested the stage name of 'Vanessa lee. The hit song from that show was 'Some day my heart will awake'.

== Life ==
Winifred Moule was born in Streatham in 1920. She married British actor Peter Graves in 1960. That same year she made her first recording, of the operetta Bitter Sweet, with Robert Cardinali. In 1958/59, she played the lead in a successful revival of Old Chelsea by Richard Tauber, along with Graves and Kenneth McKellar. A Radio Luxembourg series, which ran from 1956 to 1958 as part of the radio programme This I Believe, was based on her career.

== Filmography ==
- The Passing Show (1953)
- The Split (1968) as Little Girl
- Armchair Theatre (1969) (episode: The Frobisher Game)
- The Adventurers (1970) as Trustee Banker's Wife

== Discography ==
- Bitter Sweet (1960)
- After the Ball
- Those Dreaming Years
- Shine through my dreams
