= Louise Shelley =

Louise Isobel Shelley (born 1952) is a university professor and Omer L. and Nancy Hirst Endowed Chair at the Schar School of Policy and International Affairs at George Mason University in Virginia. She is also founder and executive director of the Terrorism, Transnational Crime and Corruption Center (TraCCC). Since 2023, Shelley has served as a Global Advisor for the ACE Global Leaders of Excellence Network.

Before joining the George Mason University in 2007, she was professor at the American University since 1986.

Shelley's most recent book, Dark Commerce: How a New Illicit Economy Is Threatening Our Future was published by Princeton University Press in 2018. She also published Dirty Entanglements: Crime, Corruption, and Terrorism (Cambridge University Press, 2014), Human Trafficking: A Global Perspective (Cambridge University Press, 2010), Policing Soviet Society (Routledge, 1996), Lawyers in Soviet Worklife and Crime and Modernization, as well as numerous articles and book chapters on all aspects of terrorism, transnational crime and corruption.

In 1975, she married the State Department analyst and Kremlinologist Donald E. Graves, with whom she had two children before the marriage was dissolved.

== Recent work ==
- (2018). "Dark Commerce: How a New Illicit Economy Is Threatening Our Future".
- (2014). "Dirty Entanglements: Crime, Corruption, and Terrorism".
- (2010). "Human Trafficking: A Global Perspective".
- (2009). "Crime and Non-Punishment". dispatches.
