= Terrorism, Transnational Crime and Corruption Center =

Terrorism, Transnational Crime and Corruption Center (TraCCC) is the first center in the United States devoted to understanding the links among terrorism, transnational crime and corruption, and to teach, research, train and help formulate policy on these cri tical issues. TraCCC is a research center within the School of Policy, Government, and International Affairs at George Mason University.

Founded by Dr. Louise Shelley, TraCCC accomplishes its mission through international research partnerships engaging in fundamental and applied research projects. Research addresses such diverse concerns as national security, economic development and human rights. TraCCC’s research is disseminated to the public through conferences, TraCCC’s book series, other publications, and TraCCC’s and its affiliated institutions’ websites. Workshops, public lectures, and scholarly exchanges and joint research partnerships are core TraCCC activities.

Research topics in which TraCCC and its overseas partners are actively engaged include human smuggling and trafficking; nuclear proliferation issues; the links between crime and terrorism; money laundering and other financial crimes; the impact of organized crime and terrorism on legitimate business; and environmental crimes. TraCCC hosts visiting scholars and international leaders on these issues through programs such as Fulbright, IREX and the Open World Leadership Program throughout the year.

TraCCC and its partners overseas impact legislation and policy by giving testimony on transnational crime, corruption and terrorism before Congress/Parliament, participating in multidisciplinary legislative working groups, attending congresses held by supranational groups, and advising multilateral governmental and non-governmental organizations.

In 2006, TraCCC published the first book in its series with Routledge, entitled Russian Business Power: The Role of Russian Business in Foreign and Security Relations. The second book, entitled Organized Crime and Corruption in Georgia, was published in August 2007. The most recent additions to the series are the 2008 publications Human Trafficking and Human Security and Russia's Battle with Crime, Corruption and Terrorism. Additionally, the results of TraCCC's NATO conference in 2006 were published as National Counter-Terrorism Strategies: Legal, Institutional, and Public Policy Dimensions in the US, UK, France, Turkey and Russia.

Since its establishment in 1998, TraCCC has undertaken much of its research, training and policy-building projects in the Soviet successor states and Turkey. TraCCC has hosted and worked with specialists from Western Europe, the Middle East, Africa, Latin America and Asia.
