= Robert Graves (engraver) =

British engraver (1798–1873)

Robert Graves ARA (1798–1873) was a British engraver.

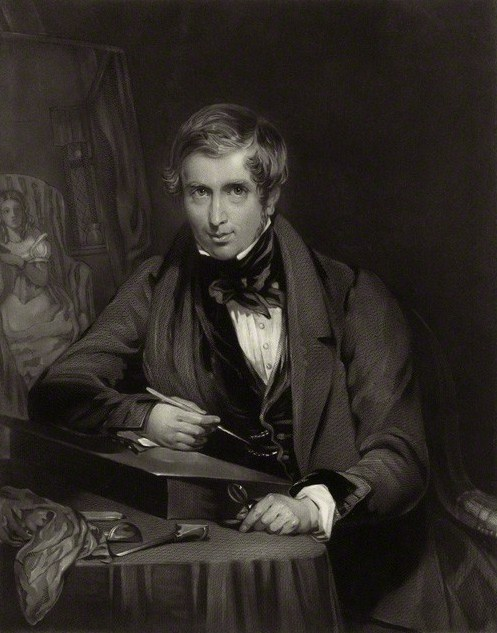
Robert Graves, 1835 mezzotint by John Richardson Jackson, his only pupil, after Robert William Buss

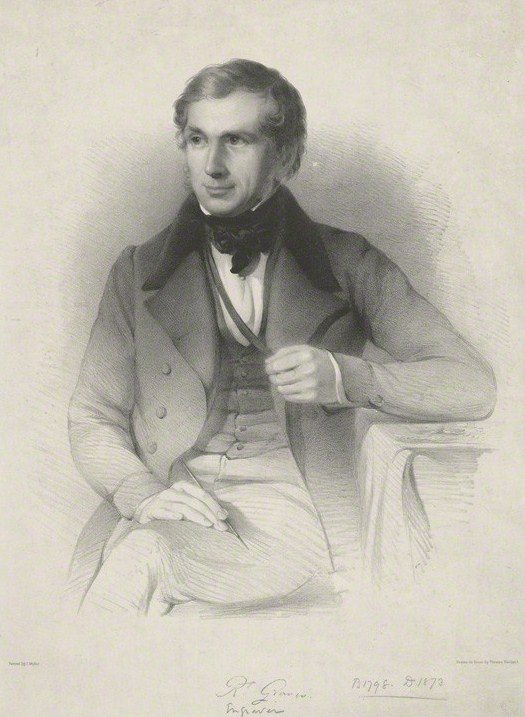
Robert Graves, lithograph by Thomas Fairland

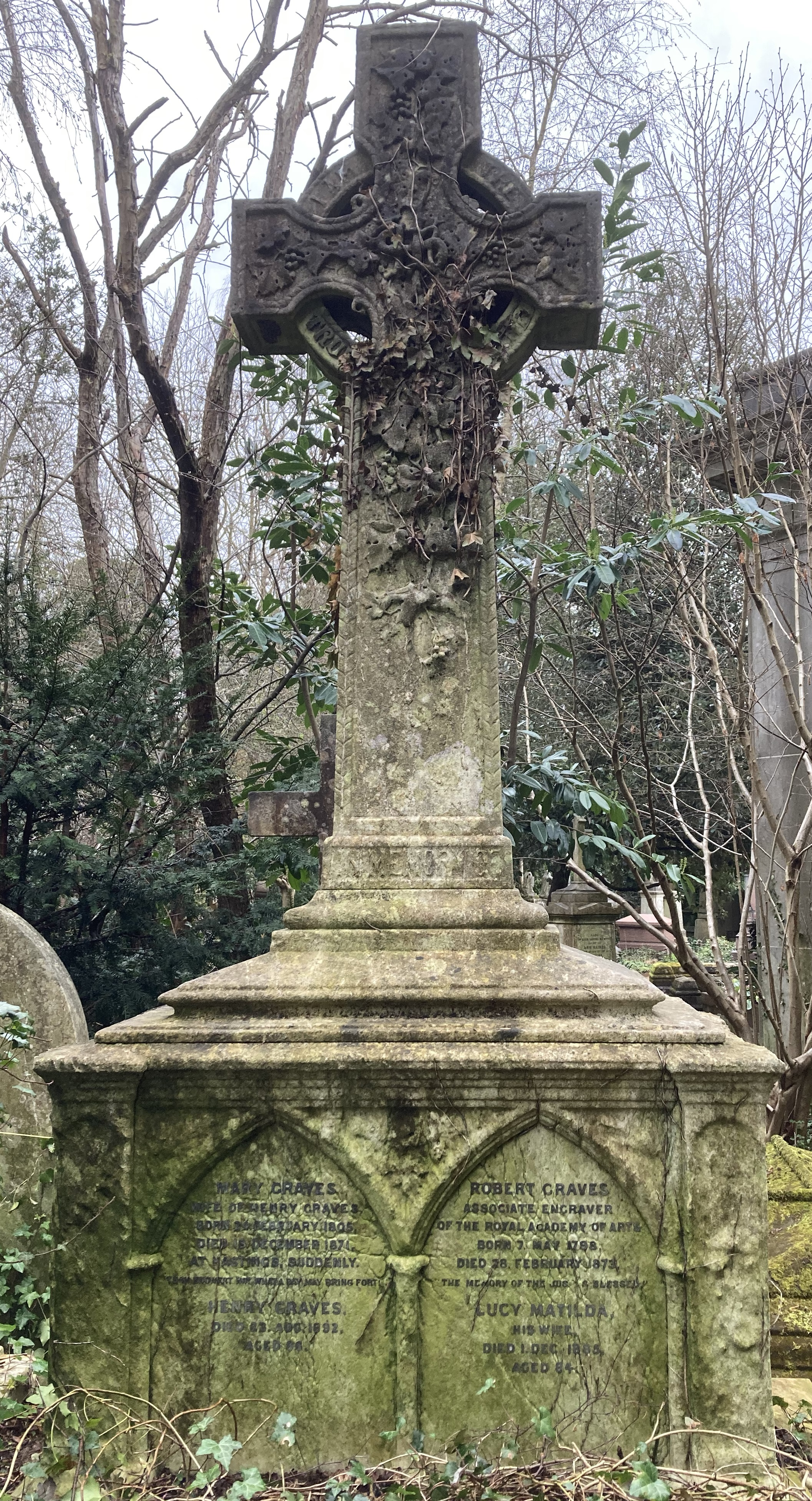
Graves family vault in Highgate Cemetery

== Life ==
He was born in Tottenham Court Road on 7 May 1798; his father and grandfather, both Robert Graves, were printsellers in London. He became in 1812 a pupil of John Romney, the line engraver, and at the same time studied in the life school in Ship Yard, Temple Bar. He executed in pen and ink facsimiles of rare prints on commissions from collectors. Before long he decided to concentrate on engraving.

In 1836 Graves was elected an associate engraver of the Royal Academy, in succession to James Fittler. He presented as his diploma work a portrait of Lord Byron, after Thomas Phillips.

Graves died of paralysis at 20 Grove Terrace, Highgate Road, London, on 28 February 1873, and was buried in Highgate cemetery.

== Works ==
Among Graves's earliest works were some of the plates in James Caulfield's Portraits, Memoirs, and Characters of Remarkable Persons from the Revolution in 1688 to the end of the Reign of George II, London, 1819–20. These were followed by portraits and vignettes for J. F. Dove's English Classics and other works. His first exhibited work, a medallion portrait of Sir Mark Masterman Sykes, after Peter Rouw, appeared in 1824 in the first exhibition of the Society of British Artists, where other small plates by him appeared until 1830. He engraved some of the portraits of the deans of Westminster for John Preston Neale's History and Antiquities of the Abbey Church of St. Peter, Westminster, 1818–23, and the portraits for Gilbert Burnet's History of the Reformation, 1838 edition.

Between 1831 and 1834 Graves executed the three plates of The Enthusiast and Mathematical Abstraction after Theodore Lane, and The Musical Bore, after Robert William Buss. For the author's edition of the Waverley Novels he engraved plates after David Wilkie, Edwin Landseer, William Mulready, and others. He also worked for the Literary Souvenir, Iris, Amulet, Forget-Me-Not, and Keepsake Français on plates, after Murillo, Wilkie, Sir Thomas Lawrence, Simon Jacques Rochard, and other painters.

After his election A.R.A., works which Graves sent to the exhibitions of the Royal Academy included:

- The Abbotsford Family, after David Wilkie, in 1837;
- The Examination of Shakespeare before Sir Thomas Lucy on a charge of Deer-stealing, and A Castaway, both after George Harvey, in 1839 and 1841;
- The Highland Whiskey Still, after Edwin Landseer, in 1842;
- The First Reading of the Bible in the Crypt of Old St. Paul's, after George Harvey, in 1846;
- Lord Nelson, after Lemuel Francis Abbott, in 1847;
- The Baron's Charger, after John Frederick Herring, and The Highland Cradle, after Edwin Landseer, in 1850;
- Cromwell resolving to refuse the Crown, after Charles Lucy, in 1858;
- The Slide, after Thomas Webster, in 1861;
- The Good Shepherd and The Immaculate Conception, both after Murillo, in 1863 and 1865;
- The Hon. Mrs. Graham, after Thomas Gainsborough, in 1866;
- The Blue Boy (Master Burrell), after Gainsborough, and Mrs. Lloyd, after Sir Joshua Reynolds, in 1868;
- Via Dolorosa, after Raphael (or Cima da Conegliano?), in 1869;
- Georgiana, Duchess of Devonshire, and Mrs. Beaufoy, both after Gainsborough, in 1870 and 1872.

Graves also exhibited plates engraved for the Art Journal, including:

- Haidee, a Greek Girl, and The Sisters, after Charles Eastlake;
- The Princess Amelia, after Sir Thomas Lawrence;
- The Princess Victoria Gouramma of Coorg, after Franz Xaver Winterhalter;
- The Princesses Mary, Sophia, and Amelia, daughters of George III, after John Singleton Copley;
- The Origin of the Harp, after Daniel Maclise; and
- Paolo and Francesca da Rimini, after Joseph Noel Paton.

His last finished plate was a portrait of Charles Dickens, after William Powell Frith, for John Forster's Life of the novelist. He left unfinished a plate after Gainsborough's portrait of Lady Bowater, which was completed by James Stephenson.

== Family ==
Graves's son Frederick Percy Graves was a landscape artist. Another son, Robert Edmund Graves, worked at the British Museum. The printseller Henry Graves was Robert Graves's brother, and Algernon Graves was son of Henry.

== Gallery ==
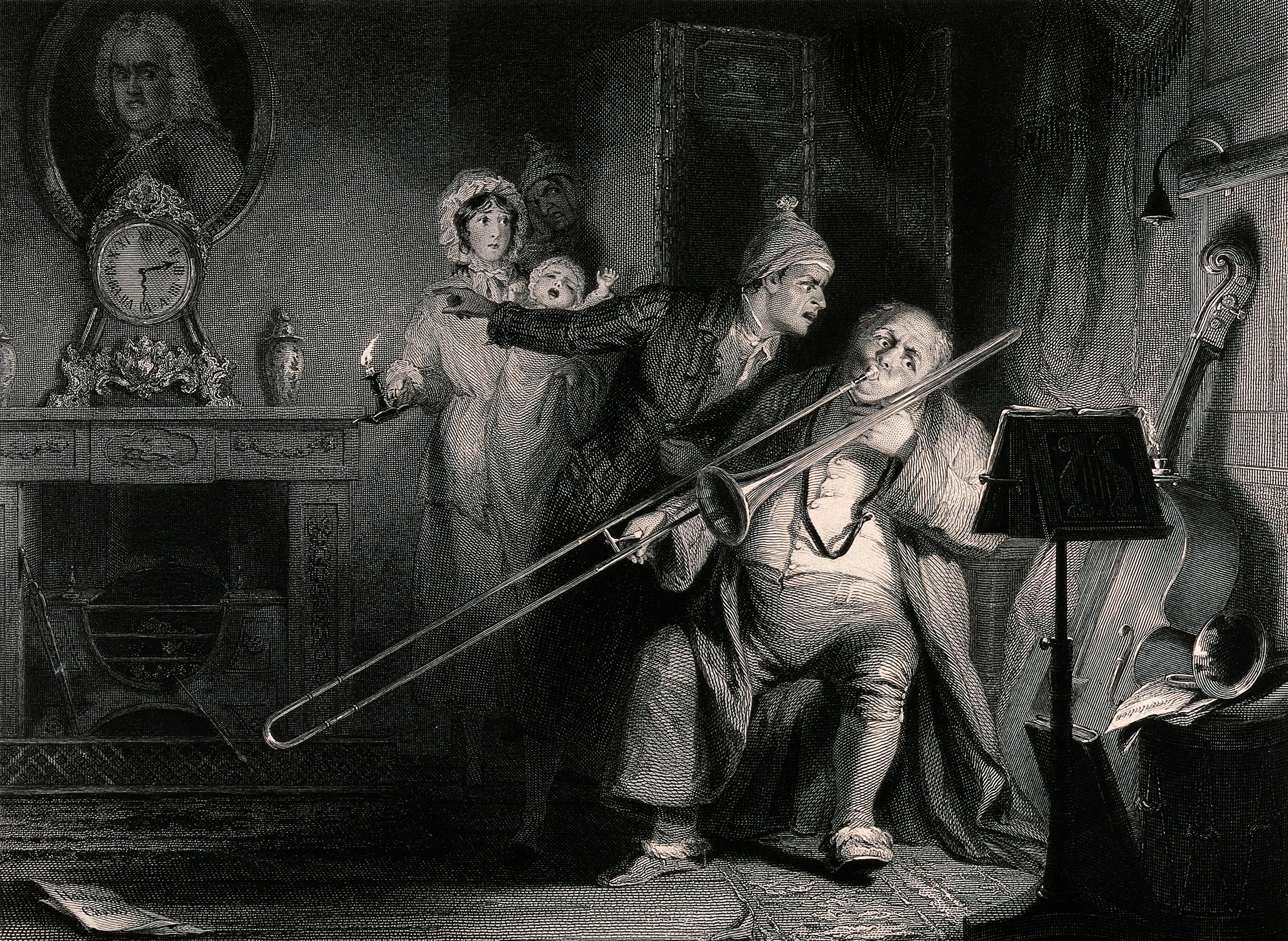
A young man is shouting at a man playing the trombone after Robert William Buss.

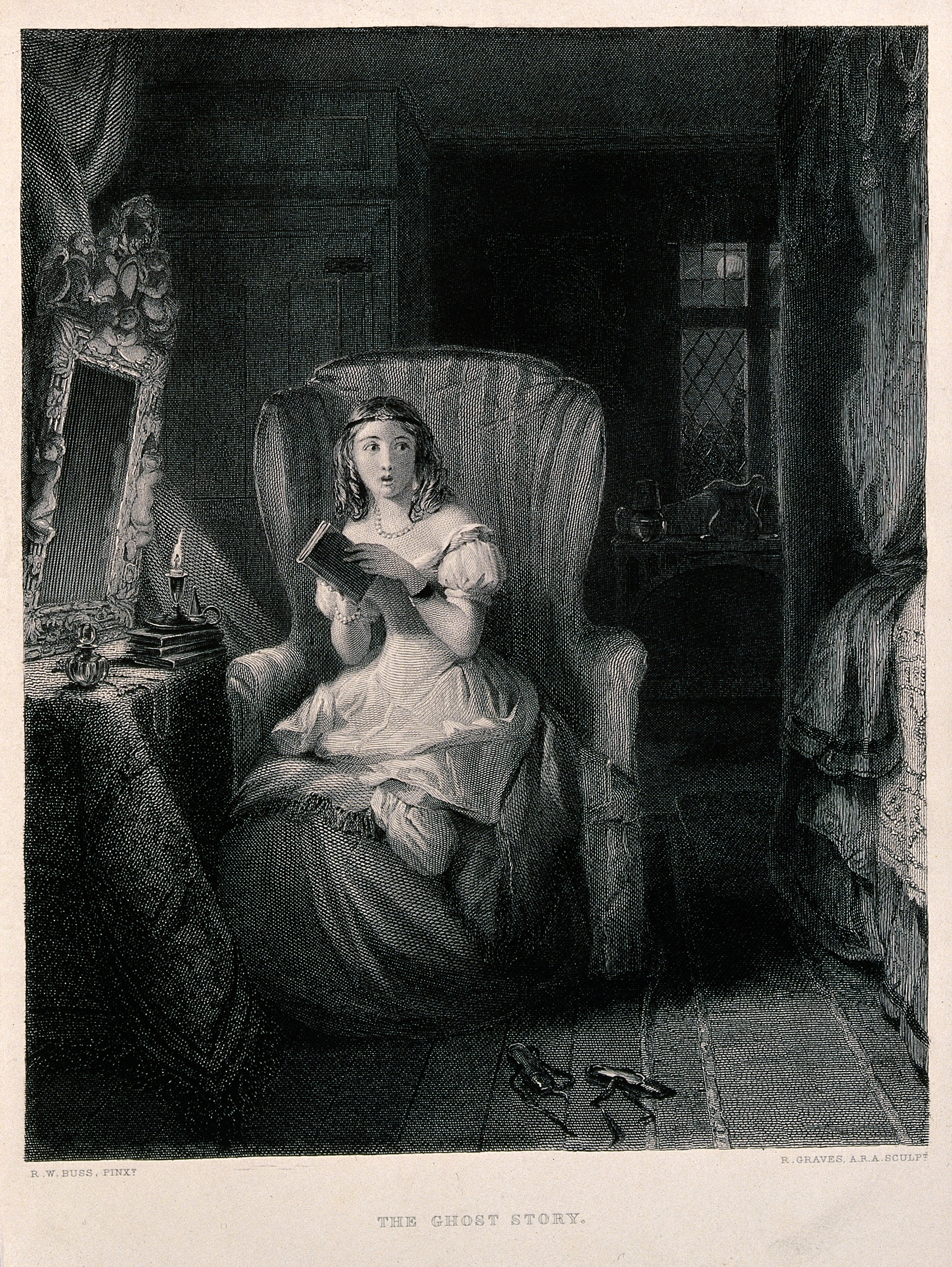
A young woman is sitting in a chair reading a story after Robert William Buss.

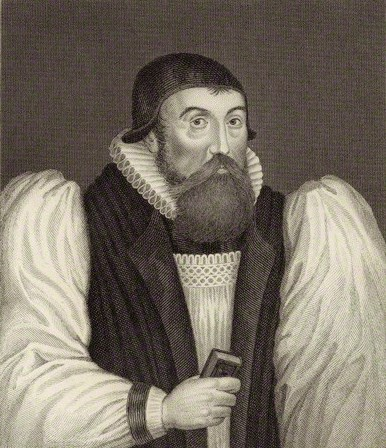
George Montaigne after a 17th Century source print by George Yeats.

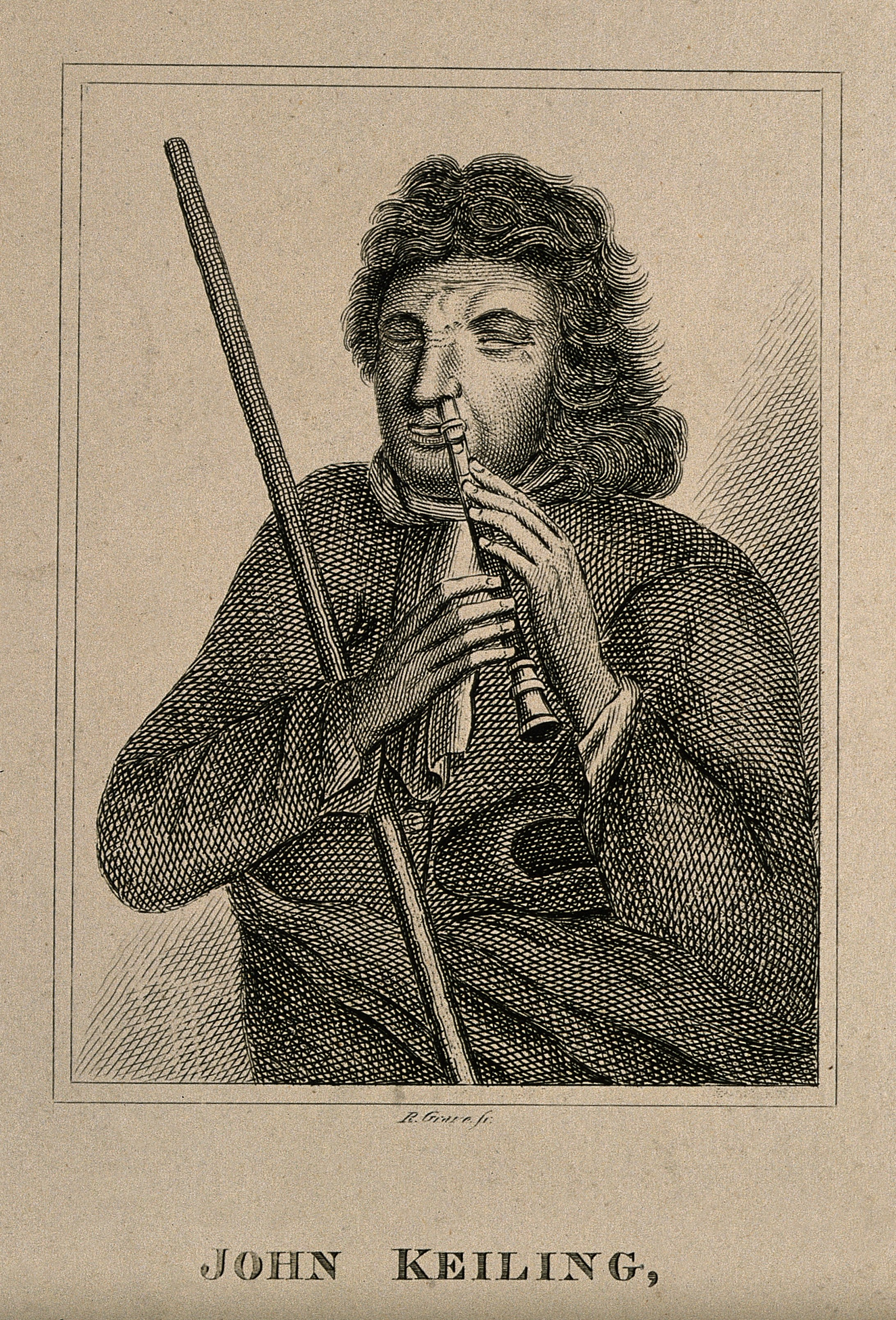
John Keiling, known as Blind Jack, played the flageolet through his nose original line engraving.

== Notes ==
Attribution

This article incorporates text from a publication now in the public domain: Stephen, Leslie; Lee, Sidney, eds. (1890). "Graves, Robert (1798-1873)". Dictionary of National Biography. Vol. 22. London: Smith, Elder & Co.
