= Donald Graves =

Donald Graves could refer to:

- Donald Graves (Kremlinologist) (1929–2008), U.S. State Department analyst
- Donald H. Graves (1930–2010), American author and educator
- Donald Graves (historian) (born 1949), Canadian military historian

== See also ==
- Don Graves, American banker and government official
