= John Richardson Jackson =

English engraver (1819–1877)

- Born: 1819
- Died: 10 May 1877
- Occupation: Engraver

John Richardson Jackson (14 December 1819 – 10 May 1877) was an English engraver.

== Life ==
He was born at Portsmouth on 14 December 1819, the second son of Erasmus Jackson, a banker there. In 1836, he became pupil to Robert Graves, from whom he learnt line-engraving. He then took up engraving in mezzotint.

Jackson concentrated on engraving portraits. He died at Southsea of relapsing fever on 10 May 1877.

== Works ==
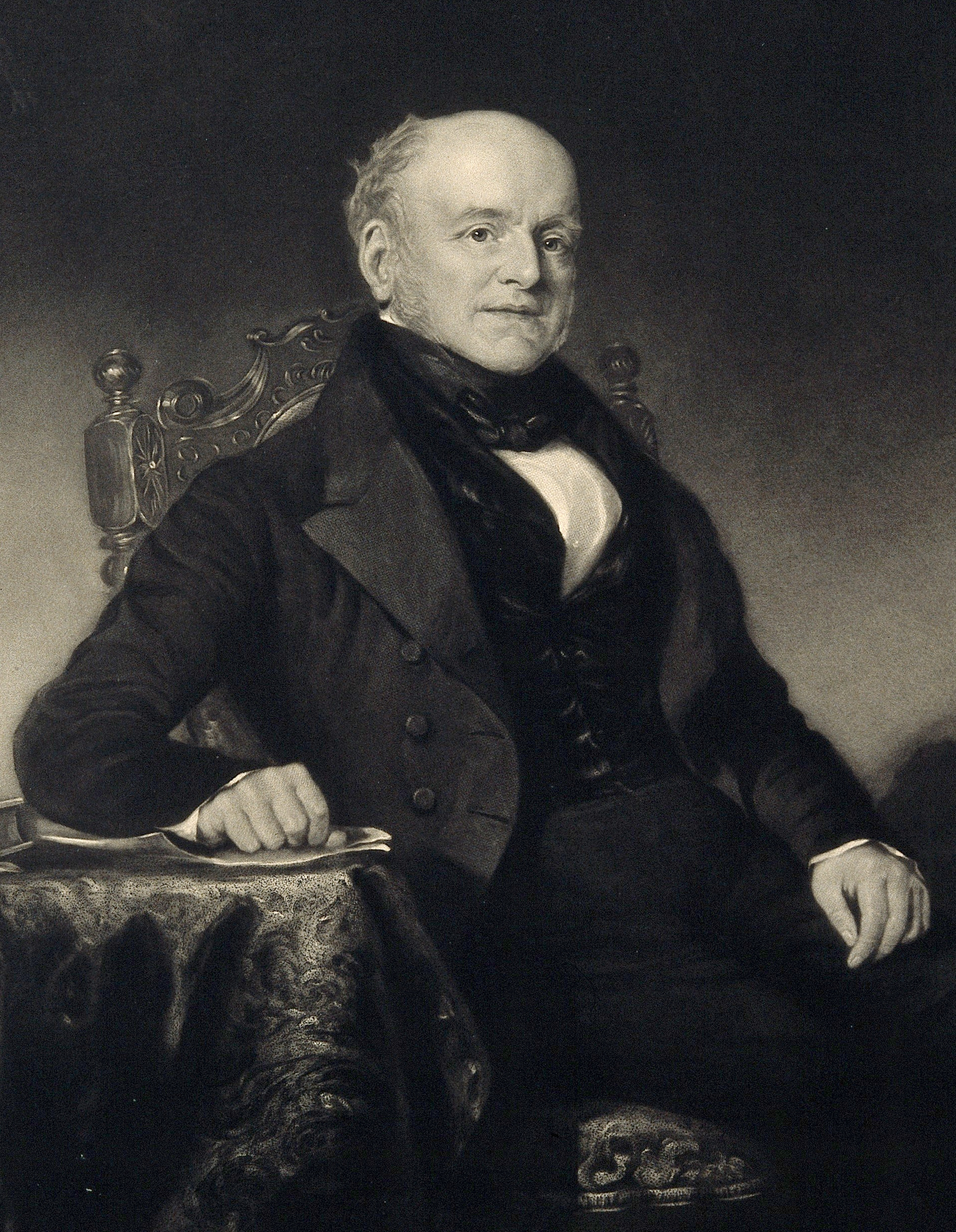
John Richardson Jackson, mezzotint of Edward Holme

In 1847, Jackson engraved The Otter and Salmon after Edwin Landseer, published by Francis Moon, which brought his work to public attention. He engraved numerous portraits after George Richmond, including Lord Hatherley, The Earl of Radnor, Samuel Wilberforce, Archbishop Trench; several after John Prescott Knight, including Sir F. Grant, R.A., and F. R. Say; Queen Victoria after William Fowler; The Princess Royal and her Sisters after Franz Xaver Winterhalter; The Archbishop of Armagh after Stephen Catterson Smith, and Lady Gertrude Fitzpatrick after Sir Joshua Reynolds. He also engraved, among other kinds of subjects, St. John the Baptist after the Murillo in the National Gallery.

== Notes ==
Attribution

This article incorporates text from a publication now in the public domain: Lee, Sidney, ed. (1892). "Jackson, John Richardson". Dictionary of National Biography. Vol. 29. London: Smith, Elder & Co.
