= Donald Graves (Kremlinologist) =

Donald E. Graves
- Born: April 10, 1929; Bennington, Vermont, U.S.
- Died: July 2, 2008 (aged 79); United States
- Occupation: Intelligence analyst

Donald Edward Graves (Mr. X) (April 10, 1929 – July 2, 2008) was a State Department analyst who specialized in studying the government of the USSR. As a Kremlinologist, Donald Graves tracked the personal history of individual Soviet officials. These files, profiled in the 1982 Washington Post story, "The Secret Files of Mr. X" consisted of hard-copy database of over 1600 index cards that held all of the information the US Government had on prominent political figures of the Soviet Union. During the 1970s and 1980s, it was a critical source of information for U.S. officials tracking the political situation of their Cold War rivals. Graves died on July 2, 2008.

== Early life ==
Donald Graves was born April 10, 1929, in Rose Manor in Bennington, Vermont, where he grew up next door to poet Robert Frost. He had three siblings. He was the son of Frederick O. Graves Jr. and Marion Towsley Graves Potter.

He later graduated Phi Beta Kappa from Dickinson College in Carlisle, PA in 1953. He was awarded a master's degree from Harvard University in 1955.

In 1975, he married the criminologist and Sovietologist Louise Shelley, with whom he had two children before the marriage was dissolved.

== Career ==
Donald E. Graves also edited the "Survey of the Soviet Press", for a decade, at the Central Intelligence Agency before being transferred to the US Department of State. From 1974 to 1976, Graves was at the U.S. Embassy in Moscow as first secretary and head of the internal affairs branch of the political section. While there, Graves was one of the number of State Department officials to secretly assist Norton Dodge, a Maryland college professor, to collect 20,000 pieces of art by dissident Soviet artists and smuggle them out of the Soviet Union. The art, much of which is now on display at Rutgers University, and its retrieval were the subject of author John McPhee's "The Ransom of Russian Art" (1994).
