= Gold Reserve Act =

Act of the US Congress

- Other short titles: Gold Reserve Act of 1934
- Long title: An Act to protect the currency system of the United States, to provide for the better use of the monetary gold stock of the United States, and for other purposes.
- Acronyms (colloquial): GRA
- Nicknames: Gold Reserve Act (Devaluation)
- Enacted by: the 73rd United States Congress
- Effective: January 30, 1934

Citations
- Public law: Pub. L. 73–87
- Statutes at Large: 48 Stat. 337

Legislative history
- Introduced in the House as H.R. 6976; Passed the House on January 20, 1934 (373-41); Passed the Senate on January 27, 1934 (69-25); Signed into law by President Franklin D. Roosevelt on 30 January 1934

Major amendments
- Repealed by International Development Association Appropriations Act of 1975 on December 31, 1974

The United States Gold Reserve Act of January 30, 1934 required that all gold and gold certificates held by the Federal Reserve be surrendered and vested in the sole title of the United States Department of the Treasury. It also prohibited the Treasury and financial institutions from redeeming dollar bills for gold, established the Exchange Stabilization Fund under control of the Treasury to control the dollar's value without the assistance (or approval) of the Federal Reserve, and authorized the president to establish the gold value of the dollar by proclamation. A year earlier, in 1933, Executive Order 6102 had made it a criminal offense for U.S. citizens to own or trade gold anywhere in the world, with exceptions for some jewelry and collector's coins.

Immediately following passage of the Act, the President, Franklin D. Roosevelt, changed the statutory price of gold from $20.67 per troy ounce to $35. This price change incentivized gold miners globally to expand production and foreigners to export their gold to the United States, while simultaneously devaluing the U.S. dollar by increasing inflation. The increase in gold reserves due to the price change resulted in a large accumulation of gold in the Federal Reserve and U.S. Treasury, much of which was stored in the United States Bullion Depository at Fort Knox and other locations. The increase in gold reserves increased the money supply, lowering real interest rates which in turn increased investment in durable goods.

The Gold Reserve Act limitations on private gold ownership were repealed in a rider to the International Development Association Appropriations Act of 1975, signed by President Gerald Ford on August 14, 1974, and effective December 31, 1974.

== U.S. economic historical narrative ==
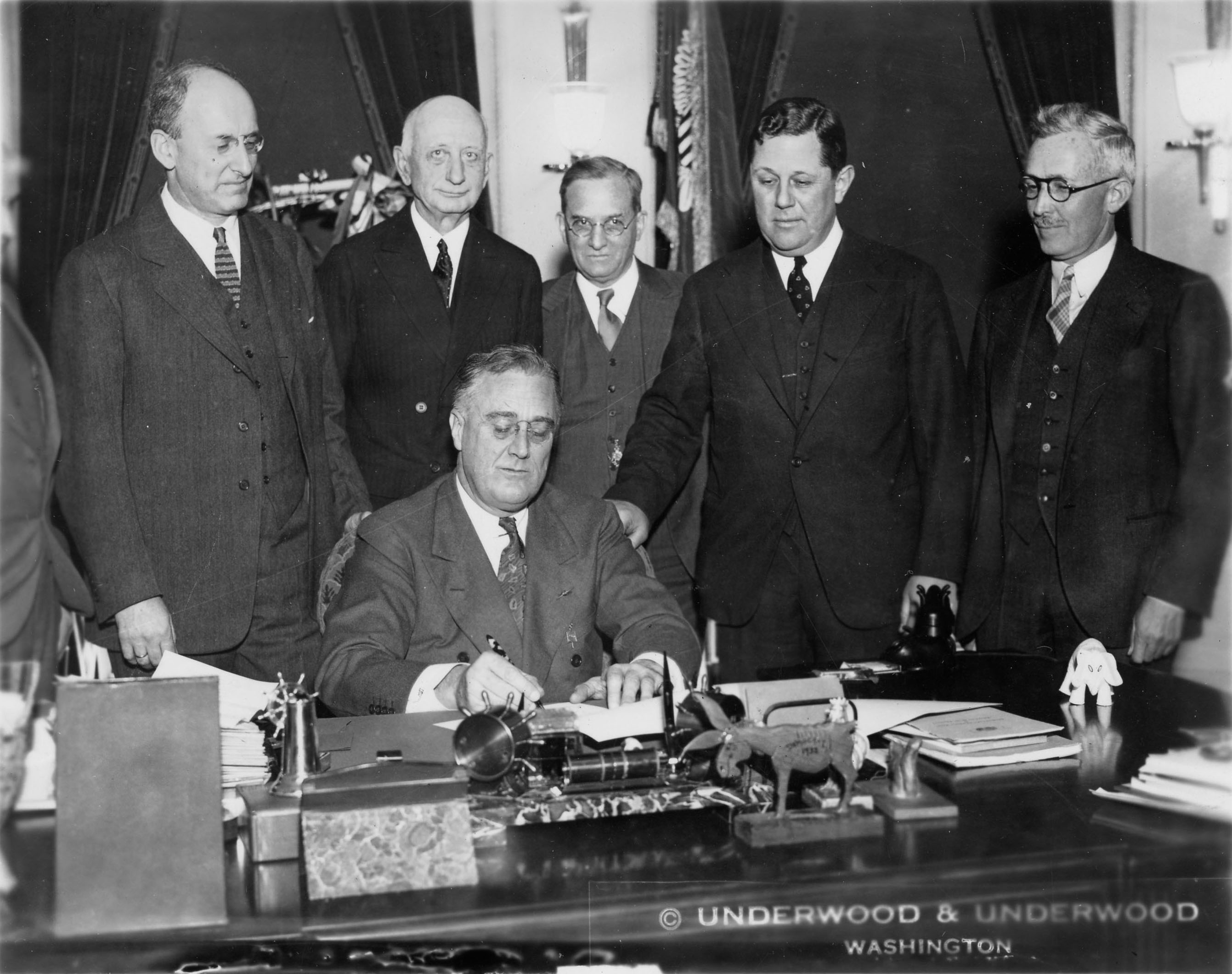
President Franklin Delano Roosevelt signs the bill into law in 1934. Standing behind him are (L-R): Henry Morgenthau Jr. (Treasury secretary), Eugene R. Black (Fed chair), George Warren (economist and advisor), Samuel Rosman and James Harvey Rogers (economist and advisor)

The United States was still suffering the negative effects of the 1929 stock market crash in 1934 when the Gold Reserve Act was enacted. President Roosevelt was challenged to decrease unemployment, raise wages and increase the money supply, but was restricted in doing so by the United States' strict adherence to the gold standard. The Gold Reserve Act, which banned the export of gold, restricted the ownership of gold and halted the convertibility of paper money into gold helped him overcome this obstacle. This act ratified the previous Executive Order 6102 which required almost all gold to be exchanged for paper currency.

Immediately following passage of the Act, the President revalued the price of gold to $35 per troy ounce. This devaluation of the dollar drastically increased the growth rate of the Gross National Product (GNP) from 1933 to 1941. Between 1933 and 1937 the GNP in the United States grew at an average rate of over 8 percent. This growth in real output is due primarily to a growth in the money supply M1, which grew at an average rate of 10 percent per year between 1933 and 1937. Traditional beliefs about the recovery from the Great Depression hold that the growth was due to fiscal policy and the United States' participation in World War II. Friedman and Schwartz claimed that the "rapid rate [of growth of the money stock] in three successive years from June 1933 to June 1936 ... was a consequence of the gold inflow produced by the revaluation of gold plus the flight of capital to the United States". Treasury holdings of gold in the US tripled from 6,358 in 1930 to 8,998 in 1935 (after the Act) then to 19,543 metric tonnes of fine gold by 1940.

The revaluation of gold referenced was an active policy decision made by the Roosevelt administration in order to devalue the dollar. The largest inflow of gold during this period was in direct response to the revaluation of gold. An increase in M1, which is a result of an inflow of gold, would also lower real interest rates, thus stimulating the purchases of durable consumer goods by reducing the opportunity cost of spending. If the Gold Reserve Act had not been enacted, and money supply had followed its historical trend, then real GNP would have been approximately 25 percent lower in 1937 and 50 percent lower in 1942.

== International economic historical narrative ==
The international community during the depression began to shift much of its gold reserves to the United States. Foreign investors clamored over the $15 increase in value from $20.67 to $35 per troy ounce, and exported their gold to the United States in record amounts causing U.S. treasury holdings to increase. This data shows two important aspects that involved gold in the early 20th century. The first was the massive expansion of gold as a currency across the globe. This data also demonstrates the rapid increase of gold reserves to the US. Even in 1900 the U.S. only held 602 tonnes of gold in reserve. This was 61 tonnes less than Russia and only 57 tonnes more than France.

Over the next 20 years the countries' reserves grew as the amount of gold in the market increased and as normal trading occurred. However, in the 1930s there was a sudden shift up in reserves in the U.S. From 1930 to 1940, treasury holdings had tripled, mostly due to foreign investing. Another reason behind the shift of reserves to the US was the suspension of the gold standard in Britain on September 21, 1931. Gold reserves in the Bank of England also grew over ten times from 1930 to 1940, but it was still less than the amount the U.S. had. The Bank of France also saw over 200 tonnes of gold get transferred to New York following the raising of prices in America.

== Roles of the FRS and Treasury ==
Prior to Gold Reserve Act 1934, the Federal Reserve System was in trouble as the Great Depression had swept over the country and people looked to the Fed for solutions. Some people claim that "market failure" was not the cause of this trouble. Instead, they place the blame for the years of the Great Contraction (from 1929 to 1933) on the mismanagement of the monetary policy by the central bank. That explains why Congress handed over the Federal Reserve's powers to the Treasury. Johnson explains that the Treasury's gold policy "was an essential instrument for producing desired political aims". In other words, the Federal Reserve System had served more as a "technical instrument for effecting the Treasury’s policies", according to Johnson.

Roosevelt justified the Gold Reserve Act of 1934 by saying "Since there was not enough gold to pay all holders of gold obligations, ... the Government should in the interest of justice allow none to be paid in gold."

Since the Central Banking Act of 1935, the Federal Open Market Committee (FOMC) has authorized the Federal Reserve Bank of New York to purchase and/or sell U.S. government securities in the open market in order to determine the stock of money in the U.S. The Fed Board also gained its power over member bank reserve requirements as a result. Since the FOMC was determining the quantity of money in circulation, the quantity of gold in the system did not affect the stock of money in the U.S. economy. Due to the Banking Act, the secretary of the Treasury was no longer on the Fed's Board of Governors. However, being a chairman gave the secretary enough power to influence the Fed.

Treasury managers wished to halt monetary expansion in 1936 by stagnating gold and increasing reserve requirements. For all intents and purposes, this led to a freeze of the monetary system and U.S. economy. The Treasury began its own gold sterilization policy in order to stop inflation from potentially increasing due to an increase in inflow of gold into the U.S. soon after the Fed enacted the same policy. Gold holdings more than doubled in the period of 1935 to 1940. This lasted for 16 months from 1936 to 1938. In more efforts, as of the end of 1936, the Treasury noted its gold purchases as part of "inactive" account. In other words, the Treasury met the price of gold through sales of government securities in financial markets in order to keep the pile of gold high but they would not be converted into currency in the Treasury.

=== Effect on inflation/deflation ===
After the act of 1934, deflation, which would sometimes be as great as −10.5% in the bust of 1921 (which was preceded by over 14% inflation for 4 consecutive years immediately prior to 1921), would never again drop below −2.1%. Before 1934, from 1914 to 1934, inflation was a (geometric) average of 1.37% per year. After 1934, from 1934 until 2013, inflation was a (geometric) average of 3.67% per year. Inflation was more stabilized, but still higher than the previous period. This may be due to leaving the gold standard, over time.

=== Litigation arising from GRA ===
The passage of the Gold Reserve Act of 1934 signified that the American people could no longer hold gold, with the exception of jewelry and collectors' coins. After the passage of the Gold Reserve Act several people were indicted for violating the clauses that restricted gold ownership and trade. Frederick Barber Campbell (who was actually convicted under the Gold Reserve Act's predecessor, Executive Order 6102), was convicted of hoarding gold when he tried to withdraw 5,000 troy ounces of gold he had at Chase National Bank. Gus Farber, a diamond and jewelry merchant was arrested with his father and 12 others for illegally selling $20 gold coins without a license. The Baraban family was arrested for operating a gold scrap business under a false license. Foreign companies even had their gold confiscated. The Uebersee Finanz-Korporation, a Swiss banking company, had $1,250,000 in gold coins that were being held in the United States.

In the Consolidated Gold Clause Cases (independently known as Perry v. U.S., U.S. v. Bankers Trust Co., Norman v. Baltimore & Ohio R. Co., Nortz v. U.S.), the Gold Reserve Act was subject to scrutiny by the United States Supreme Court, which narrowly upheld Roosevelt's gold confiscation policy.

The 1962 case United States v. One Solid Gold Object in Form of a Rooster concerned the seizure of a 14-pound golden statue of a rooster. The United States District Court for the District of Nevada decided that the artistic value of the rooster weighed in favor of the statue and its owner.

== Recent events ==
The 2008 decision 216 Jamaica Avenue, LLC vs S&R Playhouse Realty Co. established that a gold clause in contracts signed before 1933 was only suspended, not erased, and under certain limited circumstances might be reactivated.

== See also ==
- Executive Order 6102
- Gold standard
- New Deal
