= Evelyn Graves, 9th Baron Graves =

Australian farmer and peer

Evelyn Paget Graves, 9th Baron Graves (17 May 1926 – 6 December 2002), was an Australian farmer and peer.

Graves was born in Tasmania, Australia, and worked as a farmer. In 1994 he succeeded his second cousin as 9th Baron Graves. However, as this was an Irish peerage, it did not entitle him to a seat in the House of Lords. Lord Graves married Marjorie Ann, OAM (1992), on 13 March 1957. He died on 6 December 2002, aged 76, leaving two sons (one deceased), two daughters and 10 grandchildren. He was succeeded in the barony by his son Timothy. Lady Graves died in 2025.

Coat of arms of Evelyn Graves, 9th Baron Graves
Crest A demi-eagle displayed and erased Or encircled round the body and below the wings by a ducal coronet Argent. Escutcheon Gules an eagle displayed Or ducally crowned Argent. On a canton of the last an anchor Proper. Supporters Two royal vultures wings close Proper. Motto Auila Non Captat Muscas

Peerage of Ireland
Preceded by Peter George Wellesley Graves	Baron Graves; 1994–2002	Succeeded by Timothy Evelyn Graves
