= Nugget Casino Resort =

Hotel and casino in Sparks, Nevada

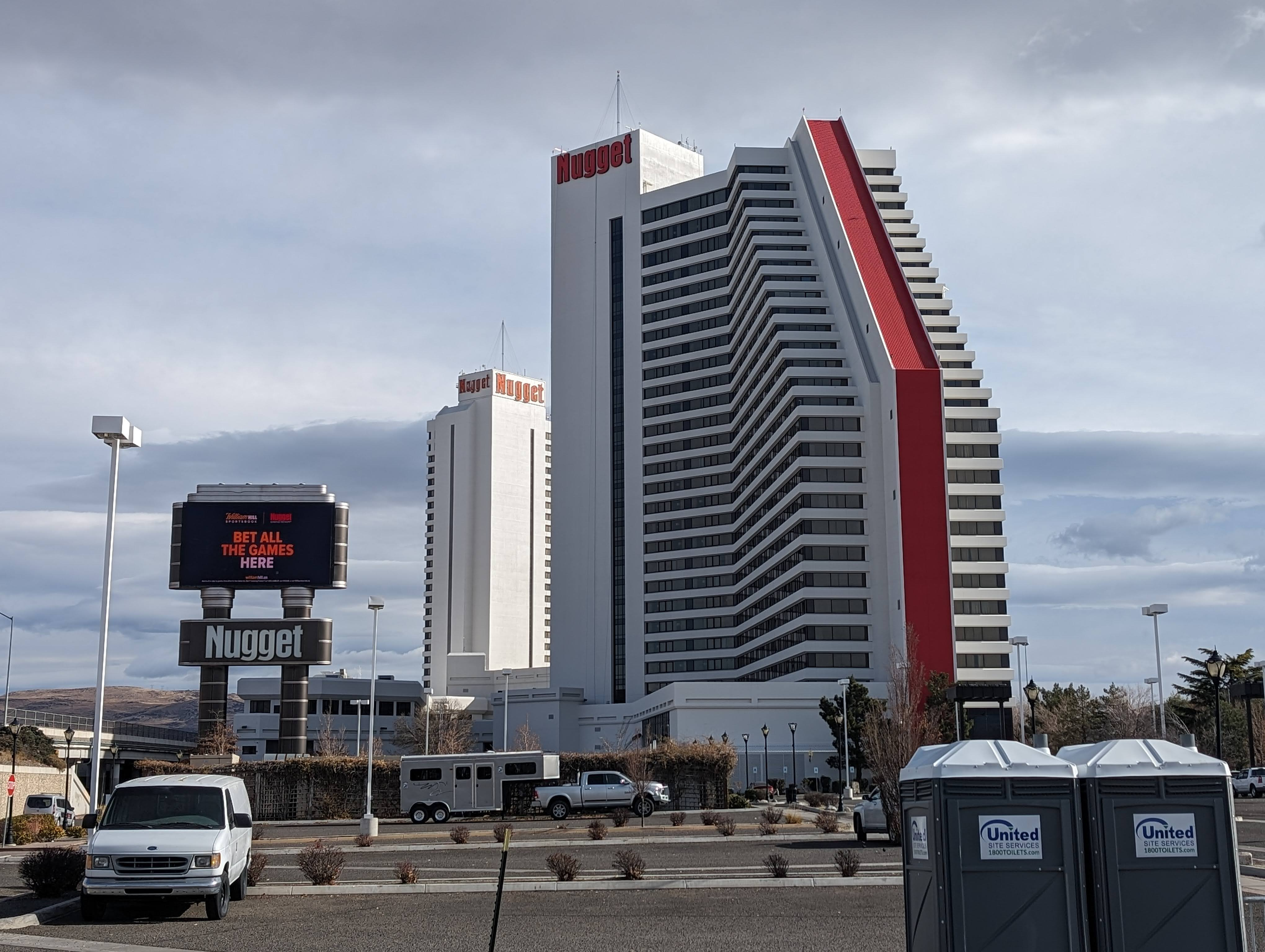
- Nugget in December 2023, after repainting.
- Interactive map of Nugget Casino Resort
- Location: Sparks, Nevada, U.S.; 1100 Nugget Avenue; 39.533°N 119.758°W
- Opened: March 17, 1955; 71 years ago
- Theme: Classic
- No. of rooms: 1,600
- Gaming space: 52,000 sq ft (4,800 m^{2})
- Signature attractions: Celebrity Showroom; Rose Ballroom
- Notable restaurants: Rosie's Café; Rotisserie Buffet (until 2020); Island Grill; Oyster Bar; Starbucks; Anthony’s Chophouse
- Owner: Century Casinos (50%); Marnell Gaming (50%)
- Operating license holder: Century Casinos
- Architect: Peter B. Wilday Architects; Sheehan, Haase & Van Woert
- Previous names: Dick Graves' Nugget (1955–1960); John Ascuaga's Nugget (1960–2013)
- Renovated in: 1984: East Tower; 1996: West Tower; 2008: East Tower; 2017: Resort Tower
- Website: nuggetcasinoresort.com

Nugget Casino Resort (formerly Dick Graves' Nugget and John Ascuaga's Nugget) is a casino hotel in Sparks, Nevada. It is operated by Century Casinos. The main portion of the casino consists of two 29-story towers nestled between Interstate 80 and the Union Pacific rail yard. There are additional attached buildings underneath and across I-80 from the towers. It is located in Downtown Sparks at the Victorian Square.

== History ==
Dick Graves' Nugget was opened on March 17, 1955. Dick Graves and Jim Kelley opened the Carson Nugget on March 1, 1954, in Carson City. In 1960, John Ascuaga (1925–2021), then general manager, bought the Sparks Nugget. Ascuaga had little money when he purchased the small venue so he paid via loan, which he paid back in full within the number of years granted. Ascuaga earned money from the success of his business, which led him to expand, over and over again, throughout the 1960s and 1970s. The Celebrity Showroom, first known as the Circus Room, was constructed in the 1960s and featured Liberace, Peggy Lee, Sergio Franchi, The Osmond Brothers, Robert Goulet, Red Skelton, Patti Page, and others. Construction began shortly thereafter and was completed December 26, 1984. Ascuaga deemed it one more Christmas present to the community and also deemed it an "exclamation point in the sky".

The Nugget's primary attraction from, 1962 through the late 1990s, was Bertha the Elephant, who often entertained in the Circus Room. She was later joined by elephants Tina and Angel. They were also attractions at the annual Nevada Day parade in Carson City. Bertha died in 1999. A solid gold statue of a rooster in their Golden Rooster Room was seized by United States marshals in 1960, then returned in 1962, following a lawsuit.

In 1995, John Ascuaga announced that a second tower would be built, costing $75 million. Ascuaga designed it with local architect Peter B. Wilday, whose works include the Atlantis and the Peppermill. The tower opened along with a new restaurant and hotel lobby on December 26, 1996. That was the last major expansion done by the Nugget. In 1997, Ascuaga's daughter Michonne took over as CEO, running the hotel and casino along with her brother Stephen. The two said at the time they would keep the business in the family and continue to make re-investments. They also said there was no need for more hotel rooms.

The hotel hosts popular events such as it annual Best in the West Nugget Rib Cook-off, considered one of the largest in the country. Also, on July 4, the Star-Spangled Sparks celebration, as well as the largest fireworks show in Northern Nevada after New Year's Eve in Downtown Reno.

=== Sale to Global Gaming and Hospitality and Marnell Gaming ===
On October 10, 2013, the Ascuaga family announced it had reached an agreement with Las Vegas-based Global Gaming And Hospitality to sell the 1600 room property. A sale price was not disclosed, arguably the last lone family run casino/resort in the industry, which had no sister properties or outside backing, the Ascuagas affirm they were not in a position to improve their property. Global Gaming CEO Cartlon Geer, who has roots to Northern Nevada, became the new CEO and President. He confirmed that with the help of partner Husky Finance, they began in 2014 $50 million worth of improvements and remodeling to the property.

The sale closed December 16, 2013. The Ascuagas remained on board in advisory roles through the transition and after the sale was completed.

Geer continually failed to meet revenue targets to unlock funds from his finance partners, and made questionable decisions regarding the property renovations. The long-standing iconic Trader Dick's restaurant was replaced by a Gilley's chain restaurant, which failed to bring in the crowds that Geer expected. After being cut off from his finance partners, Geer raised capital by selling the numerous parcels of land around the property, leading to a flurry of high-density housing developments to start construction in Downtown Sparks. In July 2014, the Nugget Courtyard building was sold to The Siegel Group and renamed Siegel Suites Sparks.

Global Gaming and Hospitality sold the Nugget to Marnell Gaming in May 2016.

=== Sale to Century Casinos ===
In 2022, Marnell Gaming agreed to sell a controlling stake in the property to Century Casinos. Century would pay $100 million for the Nugget's operating business and $95 million for a 50% share of its real estate. The sale of the real estate interest was completed in April 2022, and the sale of the business in April 2023.

== See also ==
- Best in the West Nugget Rib Cook-off
- Vagos Motorcycle Club shooting
- United States v. One Solid Gold Object in Form of a Rooster
