= Nell Cole Graves =

Nell Cole Graves (1908 – February 17, 1997) was a potter from Seagrove, North Carolina, and a winner of the 1996 North Carolina Heritage Award.

Graves grew up in Montgomery County, North Carolina, with her father, Jacon B. Cole, and her brother, Waymon Cole. Her father owned a pottery shop called J.B. Cole Pottery, through which two centuries of Cole potters persisted in the region. During Graves' early childhood, it was typical for women and children to help with preparing clay, glazing, and loading kilns, while the men were tasked with making the pottery and running the business. Graves father, however, taught her on a treadle wheel from age 9. Graves eventually came to run the family business.

Graves married Philmore Graves, and owned Graves Candle Shop, which was located south of Seagrove, as well as J.B. Cole. She died in the late 1990s, and was buried in the old Fairgrove Church Cemetery behind Graves Candle Shop.
