= Ryan Graves =

Ryan Graves may refer to:

- Ryan Graves (businessman) (born 1983), American billionaire businessman
- Ryan Graves (ice hockey) (born 1995), Canadian ice hockey player
- Ryan Graves (pilot) (fl. 2020s), former U.S. Navy pilot
