= Frank Graves =

Frank Graves may refer to:

- Frank Graves (baseball) (1860–1916), baseball catcher and manager
- Frank Graves (pollster) (born 1952), Canadian applied social researcher
- Frank Pierrepont Graves (1869–1956), Commissioner of the New York State Education Department, 1921–1940
- Frank X. Graves Jr. (1923–1990), American politician
