= Charles E. Graves =

American politician (1849–1928)

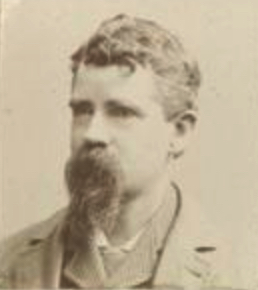

Member of the Virginia House of Delegates from Page County
- In office December 2, 1891 – December 6, 1893

Personal details
- Born: Charles Edward Graves; December 22, 1849 Page, Virginia, U.S.
- Died: August 5, 1928 (aged 78) Harrisonburg, Virginia, U.S.
- Party: Democratic
- Spouse: Martha Lee Koontz

Charles Edward Graves (December 22, 1849 – August 5, 1928) was an American politician who served in the Virginia House of Delegates.

Graves was superintendent of schools for Page County, Virginia. He was president of the Page County Telephone Company.

Graves married and had two sons. He died on August 5, 1928.
