= Michael Graves (disambiguation) =

Michael Graves (1934–2015) was an American architect.

Michael Graves may also refer to:

- Michael Graves (audio engineer) (born 1968), American audio engineer
- Michael Graves (poker player) (born 1984), American poker player
- Michale Graves (born 1975), American punk rock vocalist
- Michael Graves (fighter) (born 1991), American martial artist

== See also ==
- Mic Graves, English animation director, writer, producer, and voice actor
