= Robert Edmund Graves =

Robert Edmund Graves (1835–1922) was an English librarian.

== Life ==
Born on 10 June 1835, Robert Edmund was the eldest son of the engraver Robert Graves, A.E.R.A. He was 46 years in the service of the British Museum, and retired from the office of Assistant Keeper of the Printed Books in 1900, having worked on acquisitions of rare books, including the Isham Collection.

Among other posts he had held was that of librarian to the Britwell Court Library, for which he acquired many Caxtons and other rarities. He was one of the founders of the Bibliographical Society (London), for which he acted as treasurer, and then was elected vice-president. He edited the 1886–1889 edition of Michael Bryan's Dictionary of Painters and Engravers, and contributed articles to the Dictionary of National Biography.

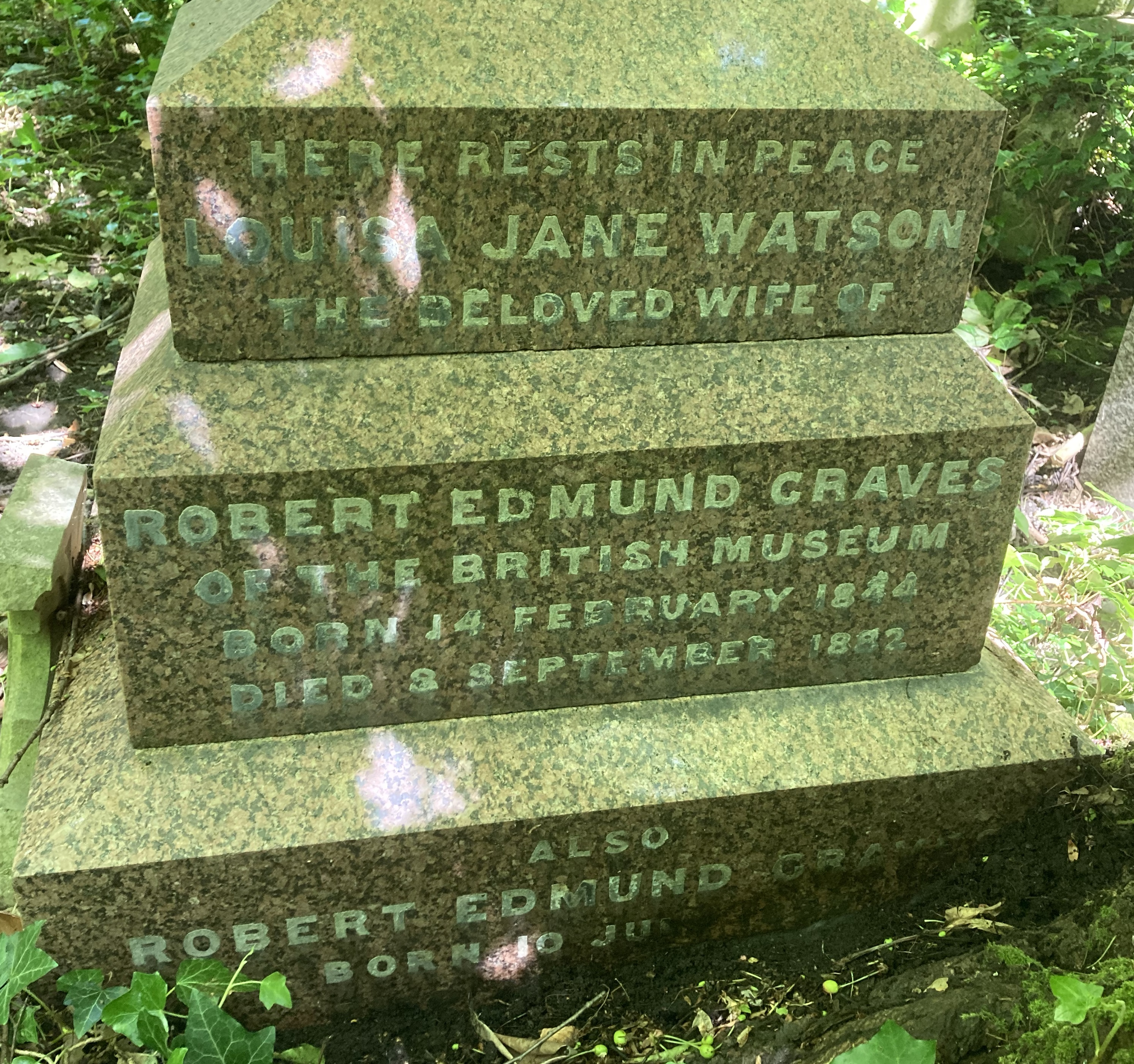
Grave of Robert Edmund Graves in Highgate Cemetery

Graves died at Ealing on Tuesday, 26 September 1922, aged 87 and is buried on the west side of Highgate Cemetery.

== Sources ==
"Obituaries - Mr. R. E. Graves". The Times. No. 43148. London. 28 September 1922. p. 12. col F.
