= Henry Graves (printseller and publisher) =

English publisher (1806–1892)

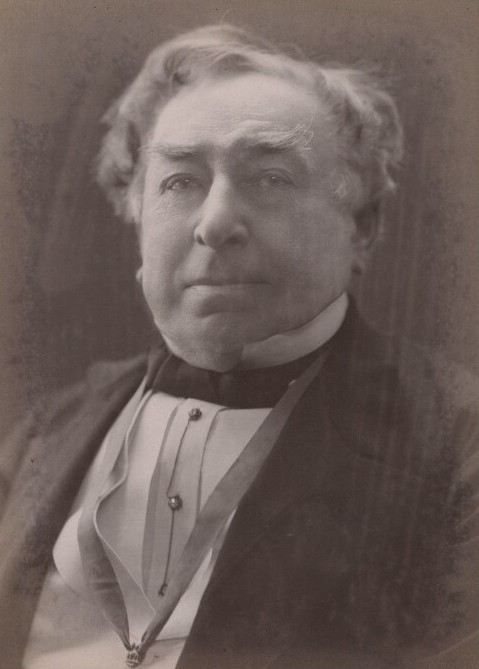

Henry Graves (17 July 1806 – 23 August 1892) was a printseller and publisher.

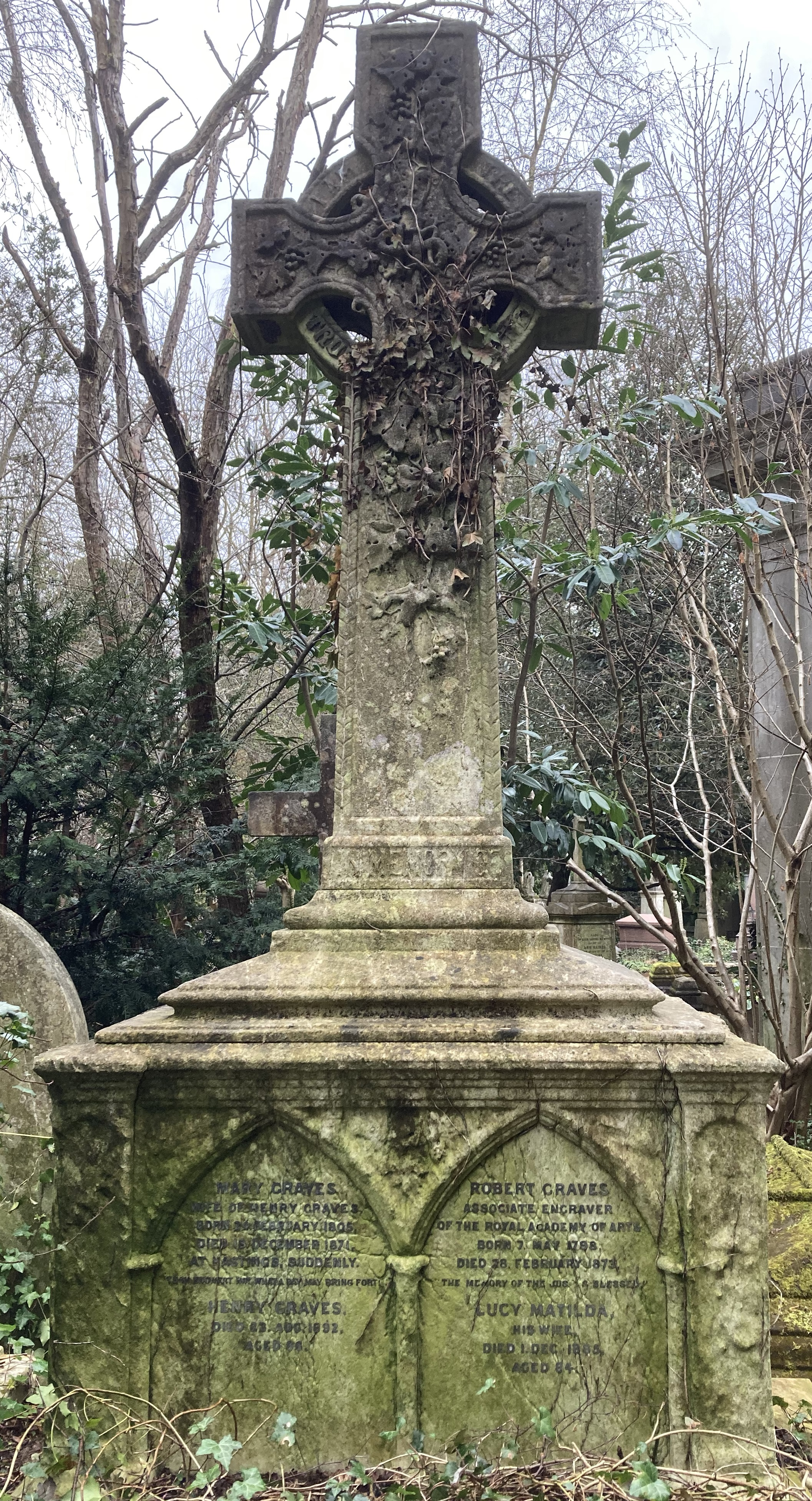
Graves family vault in Highgate Cemetery

== Life ==
He was son of Robert Graves (died 1825), and younger brother of the engraver Robert Graves, A.R.A. He was born on 16 July 1806. At the age of sixteen he became an assistant of Samuel Woodburn, the art dealer, and later was employed by Messrs. Hurst, Robinson, & Co., the successors of Boydell, as manager of their print department. On the failure of this firm in 1825, Graves, in conjunction with Francis Graham Moon and J. Boys, acquired the business which was carried on with various changes of partnership until 1844, when Graves became sole proprietor; the title of the firm has since been Henry Graves & Co. He also had a print publishing partnership, Hodgson & Graves, with Richard Hodgson.

In the course of an enterprising and successful career, throughout which he was recognised as the leading London printseller, Graves published an immense number of fine engravings from pictures by Turner, Wilkie, Lawrence, Constable, Landseer, Faed, Frith, Grant, Millais, and other contemporary painters. He specially devoted himself to the reproduction of the works of Sir Edwin Landseer, employing upon the work the best engravers of the day, and paying the artist himself more than £50,000 for copyrights. He also issued valuable library editions of the works of Reynolds, Lawrence, Gainsborough, Liverseege, and Landseer. Graves was one of the founders of The Art Journal and the Illustrated London News, an active member of the Printsellers' Association and the Artists' General Benevolent Fund, and a governor of the Shakespeare memorial at Stratford.

He died at his house on Pall Mall, London, on 23 August 1892, and was buried in Highgate cemetery.

== Family ==
By his first wife, Mary Squire (died 1871), Graves had two sons, Boydell Graves and Algernon Graves, the latter of whom was chairman of the company to which the business was transferred in 1896.
