= Richard Graves (antiquary) =

English antiquarian

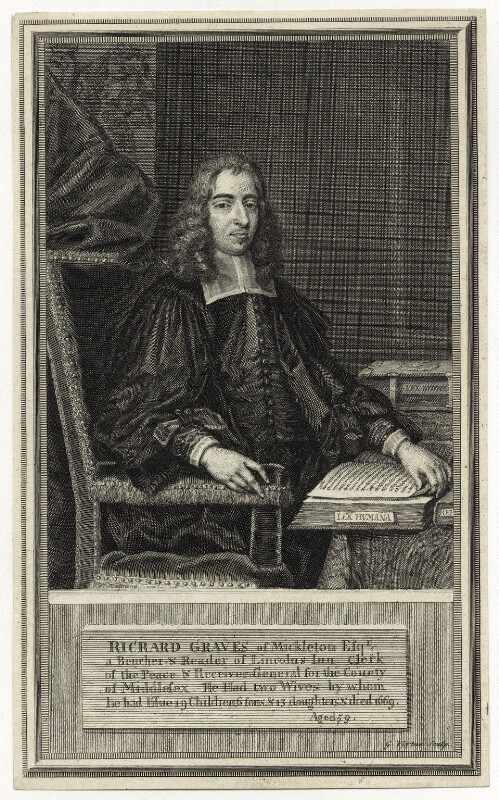
- Graves by George Vertue
- Born: 22 April 1677; Mickleton, Gloucestershire
- Died: 18 September 1729 (aged 52)
- Occupation: Antiquarian

Richard Graves (22 April 1677 – 18 September 1729) was an English antiquarian.

== Biography ==
Graves was born at Mickleton, Gloucestershire, on 22 April 1677, was the eldest son of Samuel Graves of Mickleton Manor, by his wife Susanna, daughter of Captain Richard Swann of the royal navy. After some schooling at Campden, Gloucestershire, under Robert Morse, and at Stratford-on-Avon, he was sent to Pembroke College, Oxford, but left without taking a degree. A devoted student of antiquities and genealogy, he lived a retired life at Mickleton. Besides amassing materials for an elaborate historical pedigree of his own family, he made large collections in illustration of the history and antiquities of the hundred of Kiftsgate, Gloucestershire, and of the several places where his estate lay, which he designed a little before his death to arrange in three folio volumes on the plan of Bishop Kennett's ‘Parochial Antiquities.’ He intended in particular to publish what he called a ‘History of the Vale of Evesham.’ Graves gave Thomas Hearne, his Oxford friend, several manuscripts annotated by himself and edited by Hearne. Hearne (Reliquiæ Hearnianæ, 2nd ed. iii. 31) commends his modesty, sweetness of temper, and kindness to his tenants and the poor. He died suddenly at Mickleton on 18 September 1729, and was buried in the north aisle of the parish church. By his wife, Elizabeth, daughter and coheiress of Thomas Morgan, he left four sons and two daughters. His collections passed by purchase to his friend James West, P.R.S., who composed an epitaph for his monument in Mickleton Church, and after West's death in 1773 were bought by the Earl of Shelburne. One volume, a manuscript collection of notes on the history of his own family and the parish of Mickleton, which remains at Mickleton Manor, has been seriously damaged by a fire, but shows him to have been a painstaking and conscientious antiquary. Graves had also a cabinet of about five hundred coins, chiefly Greek and Roman, which were purchased after his death by another friend, Roger Gale [q. v.] His second son, the Rev. Richard Graves the younger [q. v.], is said to have sketched his father in the ‘Spiritual Quixote’ under the name of ‘Mr. Townsend.’ His portrait was engraved by Vertue.
