= Peter Graves, 8th Baron Graves =

English actor (1911–1994)

Publicity still of Peter Graves

Peter George Wellesley Graves, 8th Baron Graves (21 October 1911 – 6 June 1994) was an English actor.

Born in London, Graves was the son of Henry Algernon Claude Graves, 7th Baron Graves. Admiral Thomas Graves, 1st Baron Graves, was his great-great-great-grandfather. He was educated at Harrow School.

== Biography ==
Known during his acting career as Peter Graves, he specialised in light comedies and musicals, often cast as dapper young men about town. His career peaked in the mid-to-late 1940s, beginning with the films of director/writer Val Guest, including Miss London Ltd. (1943) and Bees in Paradise (1944), opposite Arthur Askey; and Give Us the Moon (1944) and I'll Be Your Sweetheart (1945), opposite Margaret Lockwood. Other roles included the lead in Spring Song (1946), and George IV in both The Laughing Lady (1946) and Mrs Fitzherbert (1947).

He also appeared in a number of films by Herbert Wilcox, such as the popular musicals Spring in Park Lane (1948) and Maytime in Mayfair (1949), both vehicles for Anna Neagle and Michael Wilding. He also portrayed another royal, Prince Albert, in both Wilcox's The Lady with a Lamp (1951) and Lilacs in the Spring (1954). He also appeared alongside Neagle on stage in the 1953 West End musical The Glorious Days.

He re-emerged in the 1960s as a popular comic supporting player in several films, including Alfie, The Wrong Box (both 1966), The Jokers, I'll Never Forget What's'isname (both 1967), and The Magic Christian (1969). He continued acting until a few years before his death, mostly on television. In 1993, he appeared as George Tidy in The Case-Book of Sherlock Holmes feature length episode The Eligible Bachelor.

In 1963 he succeeded his father as eighth Baron Graves. However, as this was an Irish peerage it did not entitle him to a seat in the House of Lords.

He married Winifred Ruby Moule (better known as soprano singer Vanessa Lee, who played many leading roles, especially in several Ivor Novello musical comedies) on 28 May 1960. She died in 1992; their union had been childless. He died on 6 June 1994 in France, of a heart attack. He was succeeded in the barony by his second cousin Evelyn Paget Graves.

== Selected filmography ==
- Lily Christine (1932)
- Kipps (1941)
- King Arthur Was a Gentleman (1942)
- Bees in Paradise (1944)
- Give Us the Moon (1944)
- I'll Be Your Sweetheart (1945)
- Waltz Time (1945)
- The Laughing Lady (1946)
- Gaiety George (1946)
- Spring Song (1946)
- The Lady with a Lamp (1951)
- Derby Day (1952)
- The Admirable Crichton (1957)
- Alfie (1966)
- The Wrong Box (1966)
- The Jokers (1967)
- I'll Never Forget What's'isname (1967)
- How I Won the War - Staff Officer (1967)
- The Assassination Bureau (1968)
- The Magic Christian (1969)
- The Adventurers (1970)
- Paul and Michelle (1974)
- The Slipper and the Rose (1976)
- I Hired a Contract Killer (1990)

== Arms ==
Coat of arms of Peter Graves, 8th Baron Graves
| Crest A demi-eagle displayed and erased Or encircled round the body and below the wings by a ducal coronet Argent. Escutcheon Gules an eagle displayed Or ducally crowned Argent. On a canton of the last an anchor Proper. Supporters Two royal vultures wings close Proper. Motto Auila Non Captat Muscas |

Peerage of Ireland
| Preceded by Henry Algernon Claude Graves | Baron Graves; 1963–1994 | Succeeded by Evelyn Paget Graves |
