= John Thomas Graves (Confederate soldier) =

John Thomas Graves (1 January 1842– 9 May 1950) was one of the last surviving Confederate soldiers from the American Civil War.

Graves was a member of General Joseph O. Shelby's Iron Brigade. He was wounded in action during the Battle of Lexington (Missouri), September 12, 1861. He died at the Confederate Soldiers Home at Higginsville, Missouri, in 1950 at the age of 108. He is buried in Confederate Cemetery, Higginsville, Missouri.
