= Peter D. Graves =

American film producer

Peter D. Graves is an American film producer, marketing executive and consultant. He is best known as the former co-president and COO for PolyGram Films, the marketing and distribution arm of PolyGram Filmed Entertainment, a position he held from 1996 to 2000. During that time, PolyGram and its sub-label Gramercy released films such as Fargo, The Game, Notting Hill, Elizabeth and The Big Lebowski.

Since 2001, Graves has run his own company, Cinemarket, a production, marketing and financial consulting firm. Through Cinemarket, he has executive produced 18 films, including Terminator Salvation, Oliver Stone's W., Killer Elite, Planet 51, Bitter Harvest, and Interceptor, for Netflix.

== Filmography ==
Interceptor (2022) Executive Producer

Bitter Harvest (2017) Executive Producer

The Rendezvous (2017) Consulting Producer

Tomorrow, When the War Began (2016) TV Series, Executive Producer

Nightlight (2015) Executive Producer

Love & Mercy (2015) Executive Marketing Consultant

The Bag Man (2014) Producer

From the Rough (2014) Executive Producer

Very Good Girls (2014) Executive Producer

Breaking at the Edge (2013) Producer

Samsara (2012) Executive Marketing Consultant

Killer Elite (2011) Executive Producer

Dylan Dog: Dead of Night (2010) Executive Producer

The Way Back (2010) Executive Marketing Consultant

Tomorrow When the War Began (2010)

Planet 51 (2009) Executive Producer

Terminator Salvation (2009) Executive Producer

W. (2008) Executive Producer

The Producers (2005) Marketing Consultant

Resident Evil (2002) Marketing Consultant

Braveheart (1995) Marketing Consultant
