= Thomas Graves =

Thomas or Tom Graves may refer to:

- Thomas Graves (burgess) (c. 1580–1635), English planter in colonial Virginia
- Thomas Graves (engineer) (c. 1585–1662), English engineer who laid out Charlestown, Boston, Massachusetts in 1629
- Thomas Graves, 1st Baron Graves (1725–1802), Royal Navy officer, politician and colonial administrator
- Thomas Graves (judge) (1684–1747), associate justice of the Massachusetts Supreme Judicial Court
- Thomas Graves (naturalist) (1805–1856), British naval officer and naturalist
- Thomas Graves (priest) (1745–1828), Irish priest, dean of Ardfert, dean of Connor
- Thomas Graves (Royal Navy officer, died 1814) (c. 1747–1814), Irish naval officer and cousin of 1st Baron Graves
- Thomas Graves, 2nd Baron Graves (1775–1830), Irish-British politician
- Thomas Ashley Graves Jr. (1924–2016), American educational executive
- Thomas J. Graves (1866–1944), American soldier
- Tom Graves (born 1970), American politician
- Tom Graves (American football) (born 1955), American football player
- Tom Graves (writer) (born 1954), American journalist, nonfiction writer, and novelist
- Thomas Graves Law (1836–1904), English priest, historian, bibliographer, descendant of 2nd Baron Graves
- Thomas Graves Meredith (1853–1945), Canadian lawyer
