= Baron Graves =

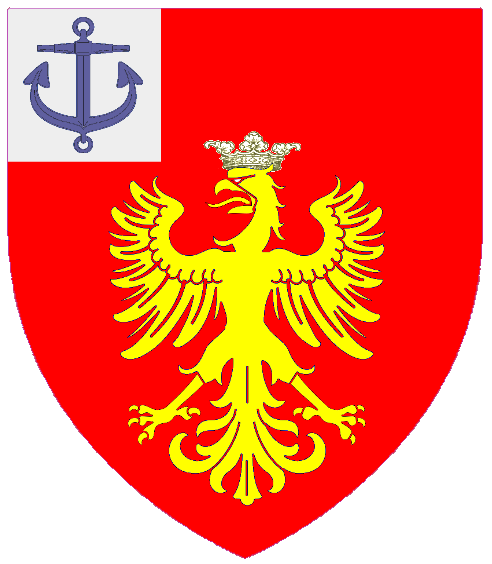
- Crest: A demi-eagle displayed and erased Or encircled round the body and below the wings by a ducal coronet Argent.
- Shield: Gules an eagle displayed Or ducally crowned Argent. On a canton of the last an anchor Proper.
- Supporters: Two royal vultures wings close Proper.
- Motto: Aquila Non Captat Muscas

Baron Graves, of Gravesend in the County of Londonderry, is a title in the Peerage of Ireland. It was created on 24 October 1794 for the naval commander Admiral Thomas Graves. He was second in command at the Battle of the Glorious First of June in 1794. His son, the second Baron, represented Okehampton, Windsor and Milborne Port. He was succeeded by his son, the third Baron. This line of the family failed on the death of his son, the fourth Baron, in 1904.

The fourth Baron was succeeded by his first cousin, the son of the Hon. Henry Richard Graves, third son of the second Baron. On the death of his own son and only male heir, this line of the family also failed.

The sixth Baron was succeeded by his first cousin, the son of Claude Thomas Graves, third son of the Hon. Henry Richard Graves, third son of the second Baron. His son, the eighth Baron, was an actor (as Peter Graves). When the eighth Baron died in 1994, this line of the family also failed. He was succeeded by his second cousin, the ninth Baron, the grandson of the Hon. Adolphus Edward Paget Graves, fifth son of the Hon. Henry Richard Graves, third son of the second Baron. As of 2013 the title is held by his son, the tenth Baron, who succeeded in 2002, and who, like his father, also lives in Australia.

Admiral Thomas Graves, 1st Baron
Thomas North Graves, 2nd Baron
William Thomas Graves, 3rd Baron	Hon. George Augustus Frederick Clarence Graves	Hon. Henry Richard Graves
Clarence Edward Graves, 4th Baron	Henry Cyril Percy Graves, 5th Baron	Claude Thomas Graves	Hon. Adolphus Edward Paget Graves
Clarence Percy Rivers Graves, 6th Baron	Henry Algernon Claude Graves, 7th Baron	Alwyn Montague Graves
Peter George Wellesley Graves, 8th Baron	Evelyn Paget Graves, 9th Baron
Timothy Evelyn Graves, 10th Baron

== Barons Graves (1794) ==
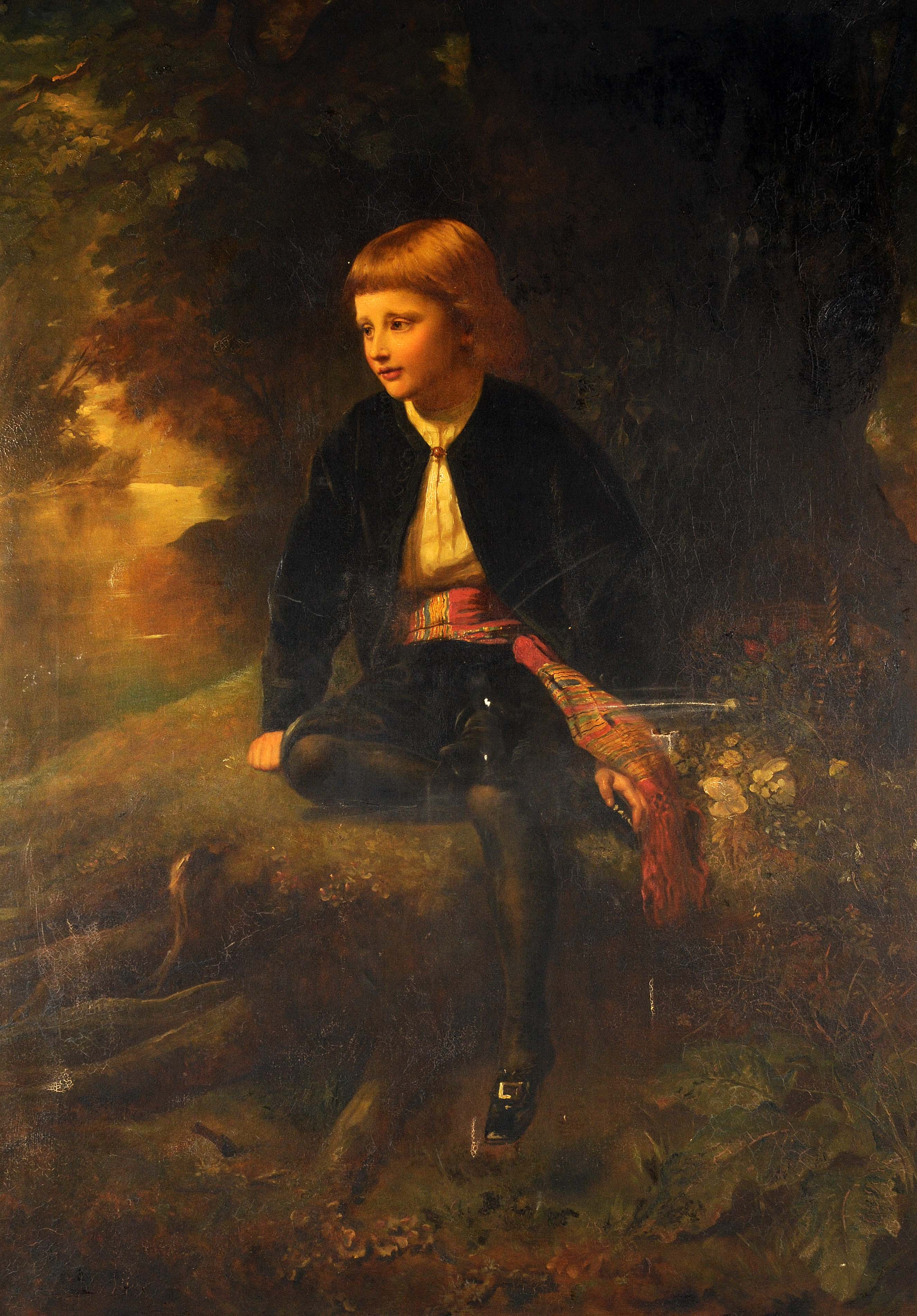
Portrait by Hon. Henry Richard Graves (1818–1882), dated 1874

- Thomas Graves, 1st Baron Graves (1725–1802)
- Thomas North Graves, 2nd Baron Graves (1775–1830)
- William Thomas Graves, 3rd Baron Graves (1804–1870)
- Clarence Edward Graves, 4th Baron Graves (1847–1904)
- Henry Cyril Percy Graves, 5th Baron Graves (1847–1914)
- Clarence Percy Rivers Graves, 6th Baron Graves (1871–1937)
- Henry Algernon Claude Graves, 7th Baron Graves (1877–1963)
- Peter George Wellesley Graves, 8th Baron Graves (1911–1994)
- Evelyn Paget Graves, 9th Baron Graves (1926–2002)
- Timothy Evelyn Graves, 10th Baron Graves (born 1960)

There is no heir to the barony.
