= Dick Graves =

American businessperson (1912–1990)

- May 17, 1958 Graves with his Golden Rooster
- Born: August 24, 1912; Boise, Idaho, U.S.
- Died: January 12, 1990 (aged 77); Carson City, Nevada, U.S.
- Occupations: Casino owner and businessman
- Years active: 1947–1960
- Known for: Sparks Nugget

Richard L. Graves (August 24, 1912 – January 12, 1990) was an American businessman from Boise, Idaho. He was known for his ethical dealings and as a casino pioneer, promoting the use of slot machines as well as being involved in advertising. He died in Carson City, Nevada on January 12, 1990.

== Career ==
Graves started his casino management career in Idaho. While he was working for The Idaho Statesman newspaper writing for their education section, the editor found out that he was installing slot machines at a hotel. Though the editor wanted to keep Graves, he told Graves he would have to give up one of the jobs and Graves chose to keep installing slot machines. Within six years of starting, he ran up to ten slot clubs in the state until December 1953 when the Idaho Supreme Court ruled that slot machines were to be banned in Idaho and Graves' permits were invalid. Graves reacted by selling all of his premises in Idaho and moving to Nevada where he opened three clubs called "The Nugget" in Yerington, Carson City, and Reno within four months. Graves brought the majority of his employees from Idaho with him.

Working with his food manager John Ascuaga, he opened Dick Graves' Nugget in Sparks in 1955. The casino was promoted with quality food at low prices. Graves would also use unique promotion styles such as paying a man to sit on the top of a 60-foot pole for seven months and drawing lots to give away random prizes such as groceries or silver dollars.

Graves came up with the idea of creating a solid gold rooster to be used as advertising for a restaurant in the new casino, The Golden Rooster Room, which featured a "signature dish" of fried chicken. Due to the amount of gold used within it, as private ownership of large quantities of gold was illegal in the United States at the time, United States Marshals seized the rooster statue and started civil forfeiture proceedings against it. Prior to the subsequent court case of United States v. One Solid Gold Object in Form of a Rooster, Graves promoted the controversy by placing a bronze replica of the gold statue in a prison uniform while the original was being held in federal custody. At the trial, Graves argued it was legally art and called art experts to testify to the artistic merits of the statue, one of whom characterized the statue as "exquisite". While the government admitted it was art, they argued it was "primarily an instrument of commerce". Graves won the trial and the rooster remained on display at the Sparks Nugget until 2013.

In 1957, he set up an employee pension and profit sharing plan whereby his employees would get 10% back on a 2% investment. Graves was credited with revitalizing Sparks as a restaurant hotspot.

In 1960, Graves retired from managing the Nugget. He had previously sold his other Nuggets and sold the Sparks Nugget to Ascuaga for $3.75 million in an unwritten gentleman's agreement where Graves said "Pay me when you can John". When asked by his daughter why he sold it to Ascuaga rather than a Las Vegas company, he answered because he felt he owed a debt of loyalty to his employees who had supported him and he feared that they would have been fired had he sold it to a non-employee. He also justified the sale by saying: "I just didn't want to be the richest man in the cemetery".

== Personal life ==
Graves was a Roman Catholic. He often gave to charities and hospitals but did so anonymously. He became known for his ethical style of business. When he first moved to Sparks, he promised local motel owners that he would not open a competing motel. When he died on January 12, 1990, his funeral was held at St Teresa's Catholic Church in Carson City.
