= Bau Graves =

American musician and musicologist (died 2025)

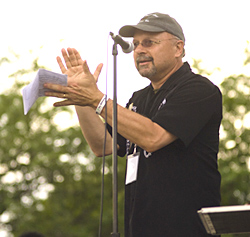
Graves speaking in 2009

James Willis "Bau" Graves (died 24 September 2025) was an American musician, musicologist, and arts activist. He was executive director of the Old Town School of Folk Music in Chicago. In 2005 his book on folk arts and community, Cultural Democracy: The Arts, Community, and the Public Purpose, was published.

Graves and his wife Phyllis O'Neill co-founded the Portland, Maine, Center for Cultural Exchange in 1995 and were co-directors until fall 2005. The Center for Cultural Exchange described itself as being "dedicated to advancing cultural understanding through arts and education programs in collaboration with diverse communities and artists in Maine and throughout the world." Graves was the Artistic Director before transitioning to Executive Director at the Jefferson Center in Roanoke, Virginia, November 2005. 14 months later, he became Executive Director of the Old Town School of Folk Music.

Graves' tenure at Old Town School of Folk Music was contentious. In early 2019, Graves retired from the organization.

Graves died on 24 September 2025 in Harpswell, Maine, at age 73.
