= Algernon Graves =

British art historian and art dealer

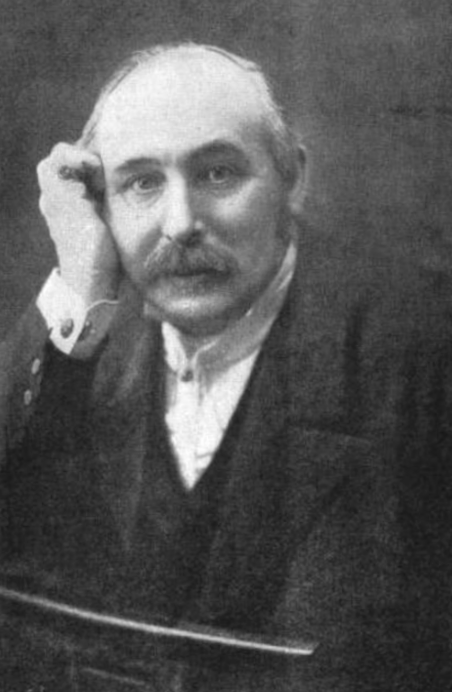
- In The Sketch, 6 February 1895
- Born: 24 February 1845; Pall Mall, London, England
- Died: 5 February 1922 (aged 76); Marylebone, London, England
- Burial place: Brompton Cemetery,
- Occupations: Art historian, art dealer

Algernon Graves (1845–1922) was a British art historian and art dealer, who specialised in the documentation of the exhibition and sale of works of art. He created reference sources that began the modern discipline of provenance research.

== Early life ==
Algernon Graves was born in Pall Mall, Westminster on 24 February 1845, the son of Henry Graves (1806–1892) a publisher of prints, and Mary Squire (d. 1871).

Graves studied German in Bonn, Germany, before working for his father's company Henry Graves & Co., researching for catalogues that the company published.

== Career ==
During a period of recovery following an injury, Graves had the idea of creating a catalog of art that was exhibited in London, from his extensive lists of artists and their works that he had compiled while working on other projects.

In 1884 he published the first edition of his idea, entitled A Dictionary of Artists who have Exhibited Works in the Principal London Exhibitions from 1760 to 1880. A second edition followed in 1885 and a third in 1901. In 1899, Graves and William V. Cronin issued the first volume of their work on Sir Joshua Reynolds, which they sold by subscription. In 1900, a book on Sir Thomas Lawrence by Lord Ronald Gower included a catalogue by Graves.

When his father Henry died in 1892, Algernon took over the running of Henry Graves & Company, where he worked until he retired in 1907.

== Personal life ==
Graves married the daughter of an art dealer, John Clowes Grundy from Manchester, England and they had a son, Herbert Seymour Graves, who later assisted Graves with later editions of the Dictionary of Artists series. His son died in 1898.

Graves remarried in 1919 to Madeline Lilian Sophia Wakeling Walker.

== Later life ==
Graves died in Marylebone on 5 February 1922, and is buried at Brompton Cemetery, London.

== Publications ==
- A Dictionary of Artists Who have Exhibited Works, in the Principal London Exhibitions of Oil Paintings from 1760 to 1880, London: George Bell and Sons, 1884Full text at Internet Archive
- The Royal Academy of Arts; a complete dictionary of contributors and their work from its foundation in 1769 to 1904. London: Henry Graves and Co. Ltd.; George Bell and Sons. 1905. Volume 1: Abbayne to Carrington; Vol. II Carroll to Dyer; Vol. III Eadie to Harraden; Vol. IV Harral to Lawranson; Vol. V Lawrence to Nye; Vol. VI Oakes to Rymsdyk; Vol. VII Sacco to Tofano; Vol. VIII Toft to Zwecker
- Society of Artists of Great Britain, 1760–1791 (and the) Free Society of Artists, 1761–1783, A Complete dictionary of contributors and their work from the foundation of the Societies to 1791, London: George Bell & Sons, 1907
- British Institution, 1806–1867 (1908)
- Summary of and Index to Waagen (1912)
- A Century of Loan Exhibitions, 1813–1912 (1913)
- Art Sales from Early in the Eighteenth Century to Early in the Twentieth Century (1918 to 1921)
