= Ernest Graves Jr. =

United States Army general (1924–2019)

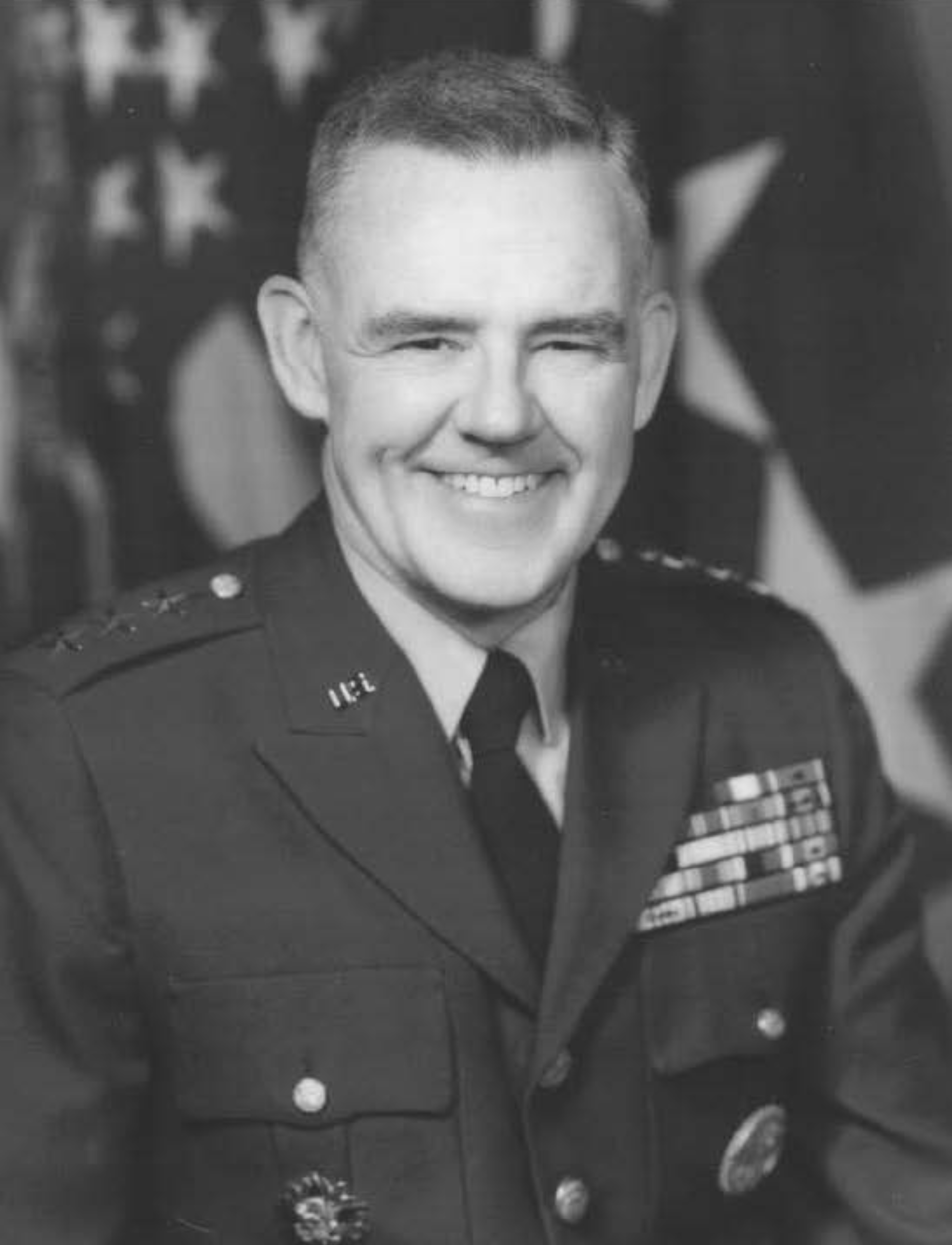
- Born: 6 July 1924; New York City, US
- Died: 21 May 2019 (aged 94); Arlington, Virginia, US
- Burial place: Arlington National Cemetery
- Relatives: Rogers Birnie (grandfather); Ernest Graves Sr. (father)
- Military career
- Allegiance: United States
- Branch: United States Army
- Service years: 1944–1981
- Rank: Lieutenant General
- Service number: O-26473
- Commands: 34th Engineer Group; 44th Engineer Construction Battalion
- Conflicts: World War II; Vietnam War
- Awards: Defense Distinguished Service Medal; Army Distinguished Service Medal; Legion of Merit (2); Bronze Star Medal; Air Medal (2); Army Commendation Medal (4)

Ernest Graves Jr. (6 July 1924 – 21 May 2019) was a United States Army officer who attained the rank of lieutenant general. A graduate of the United States Military Academy, where he was ranked second in the class of 1944, he commanded troops in Europe during World War II and in Vietnam during the Vietnam War. He served with a bomb assembly team with the Manhattan Project and was present at the Operation Sandstone nuclear tests in 1948. He was the Director of Military Application at the Atomic Energy Commission its successor, the Energy Research and Development Administration, from 1973 to 1975, the Deputy Chief of Engineers from 1977 to 1978, and the director of the Defense Security Assistance Agency from 1978 to 1981.

== Early life ==
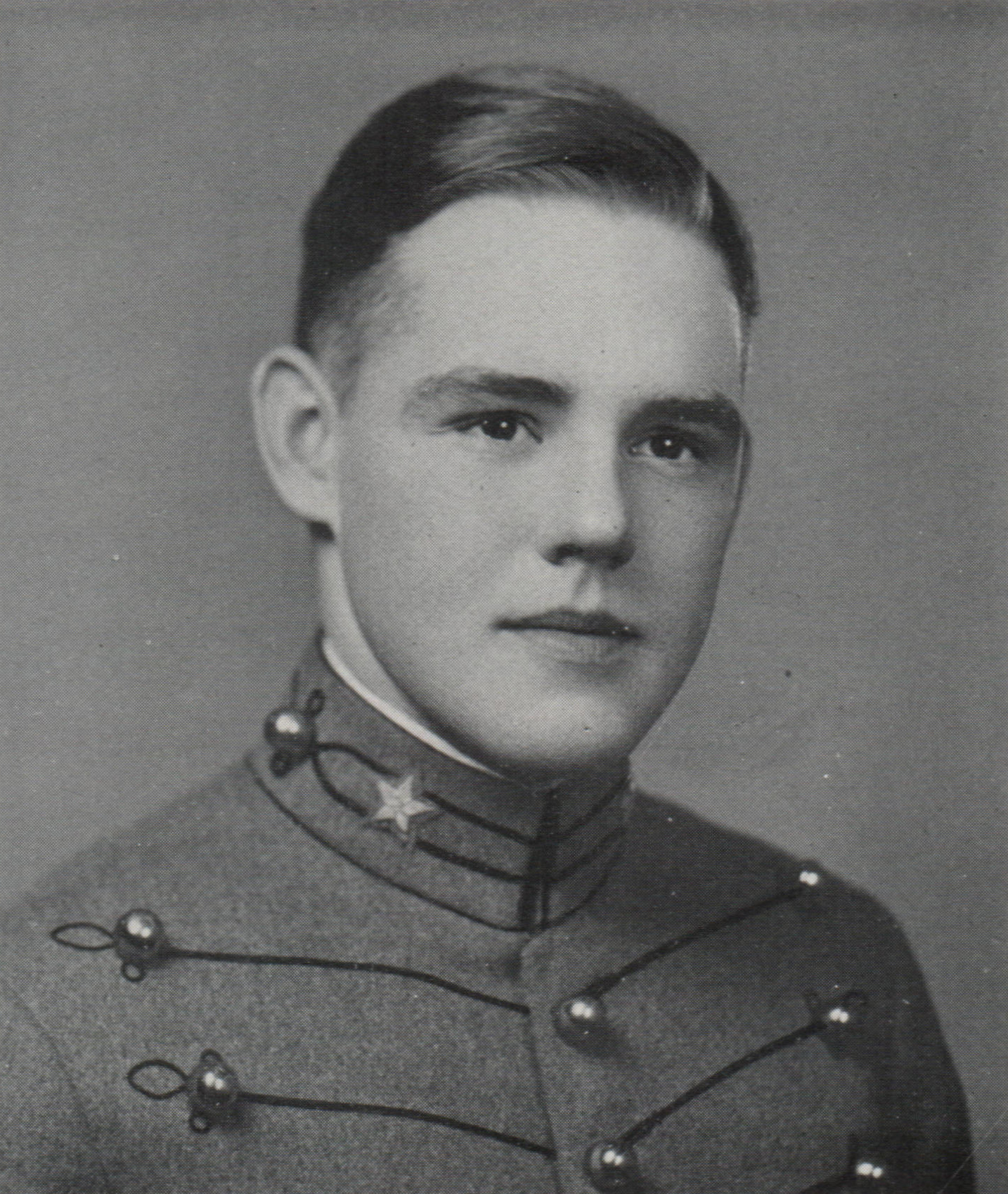
Graves as a United States Military Academy cadet c. 1944

Ernest Graves Jr. was born in New York City on 6 July 1924, the only son of Ernest Graves Sr., a retired Army officer, and his wife Lucy. Her maiden name was Lucy Birnie, but she had subsequently taken the name of her first husband, Harry Horgan, who died of tuberculosis. The family moved to Washington, D.C., when Graves was two years old, where he spent his childhood, and was educated at St. Albans School.

In 1941, Graves passed the entrance examination for the United States Military Academy at West Point, New York, where his father had graduated second in the class of 1905, and his maternal grandfather, Rogers Birnie, first in the class of 1872. He secured an appointment from Senator John H. Overton, and reported to West Point on 1 July 1941. He was required to wear civilian clothes and pay room and board for the first five days of Beast Barracks until July 6, when he reached his 17th birthday.

== World War II ==
Due to World War II, Graves's class was commissioned early, on 6 June 1944. He was ranked second in the class, and was commissioned as a second lieutenant in the United States Army Corps of Engineers. He was then sent through the six-week Engineer Officer Basic Course at the U.S. Army Engineer School at Fort Belvoir in Virginia, followed by six weeks as a platoon commander at the Engineer Replacement Training Center there.

Lieutenant General John C. H. Lee, the commanding general of the Communications Zone (ComZ) in the European Theater of Operations (ETO), and a friend of Graves' father, asked for Graves to be sent to Europe. Graves spoke to Lieutenant General Brehon Somervell, the commander of Army Service Forces, and another friend of his father's, who agreed to this request. Graves left for Europe in October 1944. There was a rule against regular officers serving as aides-de-camp, but Graves lived with Lee's aides in the George V Hotel in Paris, and often functioned as an additional aide. When not occupied with such duties, he worked in the Control Section of COMZ Headquarters, where he compiled statistical reports. He was promoted to first lieutenant on 6 December 1944.

On 31 December 1944, Graves joined the 1282nd Engineer Combat Battalion as a platoon commander. The unit had recently been converted from an anti-aircraft artillery battalion, and was training in England. The unit moved to Germany in April 1945, where it worked on construction projects in Bad Kreuznach and Saarland. It saw little action before the war in Europe ended the following month. In June it moved to Marseille, whence it sailed to the Philippines via the Panama Canal, Hawaii and Ulithi on the SS Lurline. It arrived in August 1945, just as the war in the Pacific was ending.

== Post-war ==
Graves went to see Major General Leif J. Sverdrup, the head of the Engineer Command (ENCOM) in the Philippines, and requested a transfer to ENCOM, which was granted. Graves served in Japan with ENCOM from 23 September 20 October 1945, when he was transferred to the Engineer Section of Eighth United States Army Headquarters. He was promoted to captain on 3 January 1946.

During the war the military side of the Manhattan Project had relied heavily on reservists, as the policy of the Corps of Engineers was to assign regular officers to field commands. The reservists were now eligible for separation. To replace them, the director of the Manhattan Project, Major General Leslie R. Groves, asked for fifty West Point graduates from the top ten percent of their classes to man bomb assembly teams at Sandia Base, where the assembly staff and facilities had been moved from Los Alamos and Wendover Field in September and October 1945. The personnel manned the 2761st Engineer Battalion (Special), which became a field unit under the Armed Forces Special Weapons Project (AFSWP). Graves was one of those selected. He knew Groves well, as he had been a cub scout with Groves's son Richard, but his selection was based on his West Point class standing.

The 2761st Engineer Battalion (Special) was commanded by Colonel Gilbert M. Dorland, and consisted of a headquarters company, a security company (Company A), a bomb assembly company (Company B) and a radiological monitoring company (Company C), although Company C was never fully formed. For training purposes, Company B was initially divided into command, electrical, mechanical and nuclear groups, but the intention was to create three integrated 36-man bomb assembly teams. The battalion was redesignated the 38th Engineer Battalion (Special) in April 1947, and in July it became part of the newly created AFSWP Field Command. Graves served with Company B, assembling bombs. He became a permanent first lieutenant in the Corps of Engineers on 6 January 1947. The following years he participated in the Operation Sandstone nuclear weapons test series at Eniwetok Atoll in the Pacific.

Deciding to pursue a graduate degree in physics, Graves asked Dorland to put him on the list of nominees for graduate school, but was passed over. So he went to see Groves, who ordered Dorland to add him to the list. Because Graves's West Point class had missed out on a year of coursework, the Army first sent him to the Naval Postgraduate School in Annapolis, Maryland, where he took a year of senior undergraduate courses in math, physics and chemistry from 20 July 1948 to 28 May 1949.

Graves then entered the Massachusetts Institute of Technology (MIT). When Groves left the AFSWP, the sending of officers to study for postgraduate courses was reconsidered, as three years was thought to be too long to be away from the service, and there was talk of cancelling the program. Graves spoke to the Chief of Engineers, Lieutenant General Raymond Albert Wheeler, who had known him since he was a boy. The program continued. The next year, on the basis of Graves's first year of coursework, MIT invited him to complete a PhD. His father spoke to the new Chief of Engineers, Lieutenant General Lewis A. Pick, who approved it over the objection of the personnel section. He completed his thesis on "The angular distributions of particles emitted from nuclear reactions in gaseous targets" in 1951.

While at MIT, Graves met Nancy Herbert Barclay, a graduate of Wellesley College with a Bachelor of Arts degree in economics, who was working for a law firm in Boston. They were married in Paoli, Pennsylvania, where her parents lived, on 12 May 1951. That had four children: Ralph Henry, Robert Barclay, William Hooper and Emily Birnie. Ralph and Emily later became US Army officers, Ralph graduating first in the West Point class of 1974. Graves was promoted to major on 25 July 1951.

Upon graduation from MIT, Graves was supposed to return to the AFSWP, but he spoke to Lieutenant General Thomas B. Larkin, the Deputy Chief of Staff of the Army for Logistics, and another friend of his father's, and had his orders changed. Instead, Graves was sent to Supreme Headquarters Allied Powers Europe, where he spent a year as Special Assistant to the Chief of Staff, General Cortlandt V.R. Schuyler, before being posted to Logistics Division, where he worked on the airfield program. His main task was drafting NATO airfield standards in the wake of 1952 meeting of the North Atlantic Council in Lisbon. These detailed what operational facilities had to be provided in order for the airbase to qualify for NATO funding.

Graves returned to the United States in 1954. He completed the Engineer Officer Advanced Course at Fort Belvoir, and then became Chief of the Training Section of the Nuclear Power Branch of United States Army Engineer Research and Development Laboratory there. The Army built a nuclear reactor, SM-1, at Fort Belvoir, and Graves had the responsibility for training the staff to operate it. He then attended the Command and General Staff College at Fort Leavenworth, Kansas, after which he was given command of the 44th Engineer Battalion in South Korea. It was his first troop command since World War II. His unit built storage areas for Honest John missiles at Osan, paved roads, and constructed depots. On returning to the United States, he was assigned to the Lawrence Livermore Laboratory to direct the USACE's Nuclear Cratering Group (NCG). The NCG was a joint effort with the Atomic Energy Commission to support Project Plowshare. Projects included proposals to use nuclear weapons for civil engineering projects, including a study for their use to excavate a sea-level canal through Panama or Nicaragua. He was promoted to lieutenant colonel on 29 March 1960.

In 1964 and 1965, Graves attended the Army War College at Carlisle Barracks, Pennsylvania. This is normally followed by a staff posting, and he became a staff officer at The Pentagon in the Office of the Deputy Under Secretary of the Army for International Affairs. In February 1967 he moved to the staff of the Secretary of the Army. At this time he took the Advanced Management Program at Harvard Business School in Cambridge, Massachusetts. He was promoted to colonel on 6 April 1966. For this service, he was awarded the Legion of Merit and the Army Distinguished Service Medal.

In September 1968, Graves assumed command of the 34th Engineer Group, which was based at Vung Tau, and later at Can Tho in the Mekong Delta, supporting the 9th Infantry Division during the Vietnam War. The main tasks of the five battalions in the group were the maintenance of Đồng Tâm Base Camp and the upgrading of QL-4, the main highway linking the South Vietnamese capital of Saigon with the Mekong Delta. For his service, he was awarded the Legion of Merit, a Bronze Star, and the Air Medal with an oak leaf cluster.

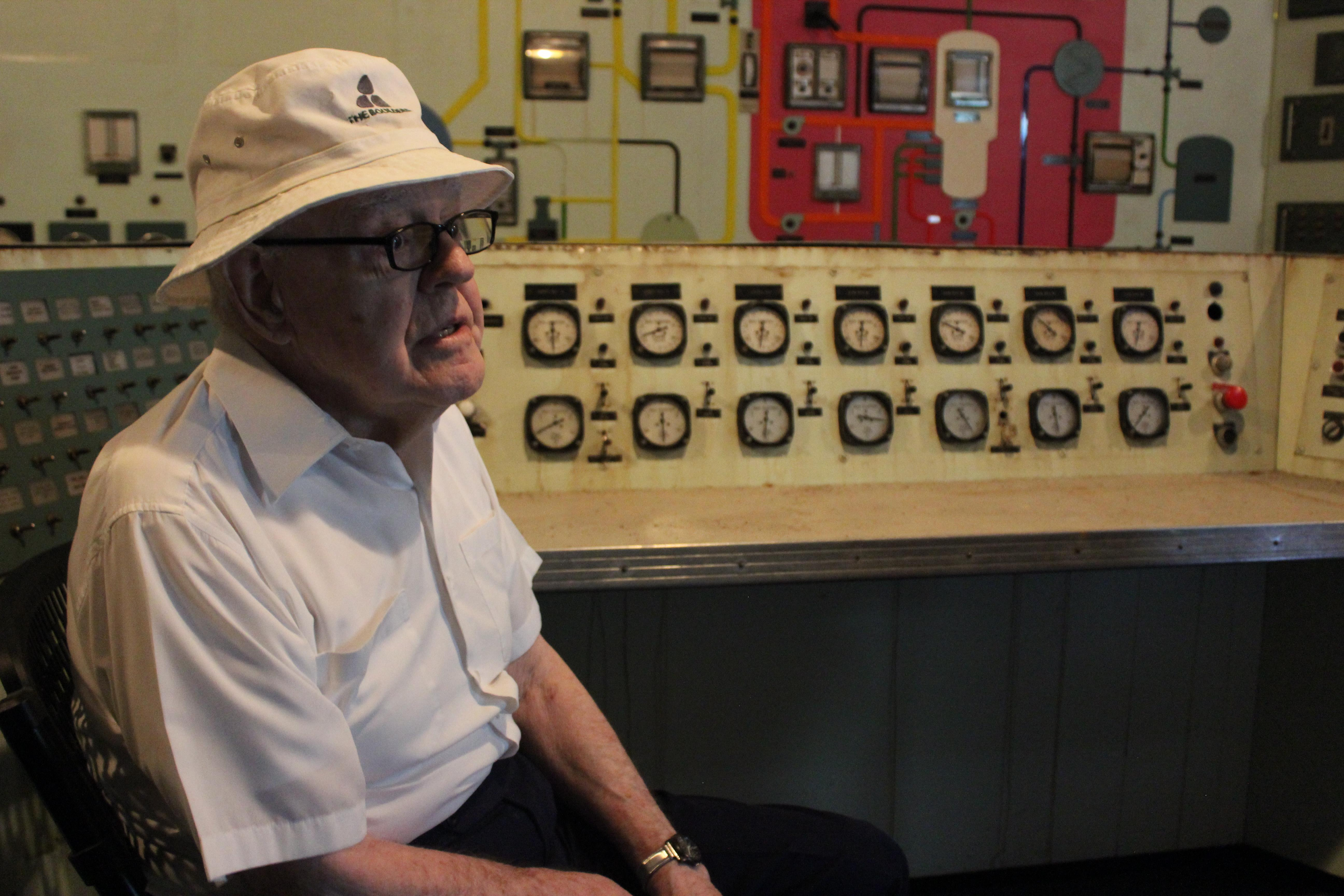
Graves sits at the control panel of the deactivated SM-1 nuclear reactor in 2017

Graves returned to the United States in September 1969, where he became the deputy director of Military Construction in the Officer of the Chief of Engineers in Washington, D.C. He was promoted to brigadier general on 10 October 1969. As such, he was responsible for $1 billion of military construction each year for the Army, United States Air Force and NASA. At this time, the space program was winding down. The Canaveral District, which had overseen the construction of the Kennedy Space Center was inactivated, and the Electronics Research Center in Cambridge, Massachusetts was completed but soon closed. He also served as president of the Air Defense Evaluation Board that recommended the development of the Patriot missile system.

In December 1970, Graves became the Division Engineer of North Central Division, based in Chicago, Illinois, with the rank of major general from 1 August 1971. In this role he was responsible for the water resources of the Great Lakes and the Upper Mississippi River. In December 1973 he returned to Washington, D.C., as the Director of Military Application at the Atomic Energy Commission. This was broken up in 1974, and he became the Director of Military Applications at its successor, the Energy Research and Development Administration. In this role he oversaw the development of nuclear weapons at the Los Alamos Scientific Laboratory and Livermore Lawrence Radiation Laboratory at Livermore, production activities at Pantex and Rocky Flats, and testing at the Nevada Test Site.

Graves returned to the Office of the Chief of Engineers in September 1975 as the Director of Civil Works. He carried out a review of all the Corps of Engineers' water construction projects after President Jimmy Carter attempted to halt work on 35 projects. In July 1977, he became the Deputy Chief of Engineers, with the rank of lieutenant general from 1 March 1978. His final posting was as the director of Defense Security Assistance Agency, which was responsible for providing security assistance and arms sales to friendly countries, mostly in the Middle East. Of particular importance was assistance to Israel and Egypt under the terms of the Camp David Accords. For this service, he was awarded the Defense Distinguished Service Medal. His military decorations also included the Army Commendation Medal with three oak leaf clusters.

== Later life ==
In July 1981, Graves retired from the Army, and became a consultant at the Center for Strategic and International Studies (CSIS) in Washington, D.C., and Burdeshaw and Associates. He was an active member of the Army Navy Country Club, and chaired committees responsible for the construction of new clubhouses in Fairfax, Virginia, and Arlington, Virginia.

Graves died at his home in Arlington, Virginia, on 21 May 2019. A memorial service was held at the Fort Myer Old Post Chapel, after which he was interred in Arlington National Cemetery.

== Dates of rank ==
Insignia	Rank	Component	Date	Reference
	Second lieutenant	Corps of Engineers	6 June 1944	
	First lieutenant	Army of the United States	6 December 1944	
	Captain	Army of the United States	3 January 1946	
	First lieutenant	Corps of Engineers	6 June 1947	
	Major	Corps of Engineers	25 July 1951	
	Lieutenant colonel	Corps of Engineers	29 May 1960	
	Colonel	Corps of Engineers	6 April 1966	
	Brigadier general	Regular Army	10 October 1969	
	Major general	Regular Army	1 August 1971	
	Lieutenant general	Regular Army	1 March 1978	
