= Bob Graves (footballer) =

English footballer (1942–2021)

Personal information
- Full name: Robert Edward Graves
- Date of birth: 7 November 1942
- Place of birth: Marylebone, London, England
- Date of death: 9 March 2021 (aged 78)
- Position: Goalkeeper

Senior career*
Years	Team	Apps	(Gls)
- Kirton
1959–1965	Lincoln City	79	(0)
- * Club domestic league appearances and goals

Robert Edward Graves (7 November 1942 – 9 March 2021) was an English footballer who made 79 appearances in the Football League playing as a goalkeeper for Lincoln City. He previously played non-league football for Kirton. He died on 9 March 2021.
