= Ernest Graves Sr. =

United States Army general

Ernest Graves
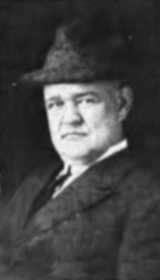

Biographical details
- Born: March 27, 1880; Chapel Hill, North Carolina, U.S.
- Died: June 9, 1953 (aged 73); Washington, D.C., U.S.

Playing career

Football
- 1897–1900: North Carolina
- 1901–1904: Army

Baseball
- c. 1904: Army
- Positions: Fullback (football); Catcher (baseball)

Coaching career (HC unless noted)

Football
- 1906: Army
- 1908: Harvard (line)
- 1912: Army

Baseball
- 1901: North Carolina

Head coaching record
- Overall: 7–8–1 (football); 11–4–2 (baseball)

Ernest "Pot" Graves (March 27, 1880 – June 9, 1953) was an American football and baseball player, coach, and United States Army officer. He served as the head football coach at the United States Military Academy in 1906 and 1912. Graves retired from the Army with the rank of brigadier general.

== Biography ==
Graves was born and raised in Chapel Hill, North Carolina. He attended the United States Military Academy at West Point, New York, graduating second in his class in 1905.

He served with the 3rd Engineers at Fort Leavenworth, Kansas, and subsequently served in the Philippines from 1909 to 1910. He later served in Mexico with General John J. Pershing, commanding the engineering company that built roads to allow supplies to be provided to the Army. He also served with Pershing in France during World War I. During World War I, he was placed in charge of the Intermediate Section and was responsible for building warehouses used to supply the Army in France. He received the Army Distinguished Service Medal for his efforts during the war, the citation for which reads:

The President of the United States of America, authorized by Act of Congress, July 9, 1918, takes pleasure in presenting the Army Distinguished Service Medal to Colonel (Corps of Engineers) Ernest Graves, United States Army, for exceptionally meritorious and distinguished services to the Government of the United States, in a duty of great responsibility during World War I. Colonel Graves was charged with the construction of the Grieves Storage Depot and later was appointed Engineer Officer of the Intermediate Section, Services of Supply, where he was placed in charge of all construction projects west of Bourges. As Engineer Officer of Base Section No. 2 and of the Advance Section, S.O.S., he performed the duties with which he was entrusted in a conspicuously meritorious manner. In the many responsible capacities in which he was employed the performance of his duty was characterized by sound judgment and untiring zeal.

He was retired from the army in 1921 due to deafness.

== Family and death ==
After leaving the military, Graves married Lucie Gunn Birnie in 1923. Graves' son, Ernest Graves Jr., became a lieutenant general in the Army. Graves died at the age of 73 on June 9, 1953, at Walter Reed Hospital in Washington, D.C.

== Head coaching record ==
=== Football ===
Year	Team	Overall	Conference	Standing	Bowl/playoffs
Army Cadets (Independent) (1906)
1906	Army	2–5–1 (Note: Graves took over as head coach after Henry Smither was relieved from duty following a 12–0 victory over Tufts in the season opener.)			
Army Cadets (Independent) (1912)
1912	Army	5–3			
Army:		7–8–1			
Total:		7–8–1			

== See also ==
- List of college football head coaches with non-consecutive tenure
