= Greaves (surname) =

Greaves is an English surname. Notable people with the surname include:

- Aaron Greaves, Australian rules football coach and former player
- Alex Greaves, British jockey
- Angie Greaves, British radio presenter in London
- Bob Greaves, British journalist, TV presenter and producer
- Charles Greaves, engineer
- Charles Sprengel Greaves, legal writer
- C. J. Greaves, American racing driver
- Damon Greaves (born 2000), Australian college football player
- Dan Greaves (athlete) (born 1982), British athlete
- Daniel Greaves (musician), Canadian rock vocalist and songwriter
- Danny Greaves (footballer), English former professional footballer
- Sir Edward Greaves, 1st Baronet (1608–1680), English royal physician
- Edward Greaves (Australian politician) (1910–1964), member of the New South Wales Legislative Assembly
- Edward Greaves (MP) (1803–1879), English banker and Conservative politician
- Edward Evelyn Greaves (1940–2018), High Commissioner of Barbados to Canada
- Gary Greaves, American football player
- Genielle Greaves (born 1983), Saint Vincent and the Grenadines cricketer
- Ian Greaves (1942–2009), English footballer for Manchester United etc.
- Ida Greaves (1875–1954), Australian WWI matron
- Jane Greaves, British astronomy
- Jimmy Greaves (1940–2021), English footballer
- John Greaves, English mathematician and antiquary
- John Greaves (musician), British bass guitarist and composer
- John Edward Greaves (1846–1923), British vice-consul at Berdiansk, Russian Empire, founder of John E. Greaves and Co.
- John Ernest Greaves, Welsh slate mine owner and Lord Lieutenant of Caernarvonshire
- Johnny Greaves (boxer), English boxer
- Johnny Greaves (racing driver), American racetrack driver
- Johnny Greaves (rugby league), Australian rugby player * Justin Greaves Barbados and West Indies cricketer
- Louise Archambault Greaves, filmmaker, co-producer, director with husband William Greaves
- Lucien Greaves (born c.1976), American social activist, a founder of the Satanic Temple
- Mark Greaves (born 1975), English football defender, played for Hull, Boston United etc.
- Melvyn Greaves (born 1941), British cancer biologist
- Nicholas Greaves (1605?–1673), English churchman, Dean of Dromore Cathedral, Co. Down
- Percy L. Greaves, Jr. (1906–1984), American economist and presidential candidate
- Philip Greaves (born 1931), Barbadian politician
- R.B. Greaves, R&B musician
- Sandra Greaves, Canadian judoka
- Shanae Greaves, (born 1993), Australian basketball player
- Sheila Greaves (1911–2005), British nurse, recipient of the George Medal during the Second World War
- Thomas Greaves (footballer) (1888–1960), English football forward with Stoke 1908–11
- Thomas Greaves (musician) (fl. 1604)
- Thomas Greaves (orientalist) (1613–1676)
- Tommy Greaves (1892–19??), English football full back with Bury and Darlington 1911–28
- Tony Greaves, Baron Greaves (1942–2021), British Liberal Democrat politician
- Walter Greaves (artist) (1846–1930), artist and protégé of Whistler
- Walter Greaves (cyclist) (1907–1987), British cyclist who set the world record for distance ridden in a year
- Will Greaves, Canadian politician
- William Greaves, filmmaker
- William Michael Herbert Greaves, British astronomer

== See also ==
- Grieve (surname)
- Grieves (surname)
- Graver (surname)
- Graves (surname)
- Greeves (surname)
- Grieves (surname)
- Grover (surname)
- Groover (surname)
- Groves (surname)
- Reeves (surname)
- Reeve (surname)
