= Groover (surname) =

Groover is an English surname. Notable people with the surname include:

- Denmark Groover Jr. (1922–2001), American politician
- Gino Groover (born 2002), American baseball player
- Jan Groover (1943–2012), American photographer
- John Groover Jr., musician with the band The Futuristiks
- Wink Groover (1935–2010), American horse trainer

Notable places named after people with the surname include:

- Groover-Stewart Drug Company Building in Florida
- Hatcher-Groover-Schwartz House in Georgia

== See also ==
- Grieve (surname)
- Grieves (surname)
- Graver (surname)
- Graves (surname)
- Greeves
- Grover (surname)
- Groves (surname)
