= Grieve (surname) =

Grieve is a surname. Notable people with the surname include:

- Alan Grieve (1928–2025), British lawyer and charity founder
- Andrew Grieve (born 1939), Welsh television and film director
- Basil Grieve (1864–1917), English cricketer
- Ben Grieve (born 1976), American baseball player
- Bessie Grieve (1923–1996), a.k.a. Bessie Skea, Orkney writer
- Bill Grieve (1900–1979), American baseball umpire
- Brent Grieve (born 1969), Canadian ice hockey player
- Brian Grieve (1907–1997), Australian botanist
- C. M. Grieve (1892–1978), Scottish writer
- David Grieve (1808–1889) Scottish geologist
- Dominic Grieve (born 1956), British politician and barrister
- Edith Grieve (1892–1972), Australian commercial artist and illustrator
- Gordon Grieve (1912–1993), New Zealand politician
- Harold Grieve (1901–1993), American motion picture art director
- Henry Grieve (1738–1810), Moderator of the General Assembly of the Church of Scotland in 1783
- James Nicol Grieve (1855–1918), Ontario farmer and political figure
- Janet Grieve (1940–2025), New Zealand biological oceanographer
- Jock Grieve (1887–1955), Scottish footballer
- John Grieve (actor) (1924–2003), Scottish actor
- John Grieve (Lord Provost) (d. 1803), Lord Provost of Edinburgh
- John Grieve (physician) (1753–1805) Scottish physician linked to the Russian royal family
- John Grieve (police officer) (born 1946), British police officer
- John Grieve (VC) (1821–1863), Scottish Victoria Cross recipient
- Ken Grieve, British television director
- Lucia C. G. Grieve (1862–1946), Irish-American educator, scholar, poet
- Mary Grieve (1906–1998), Scottish magazine editor and journalist
- Maud Grieve (1858–1931), English horticulturalist and herbalist
- Ollie Grieve (1920–1978), Australian footballer
- Percy Grieve (1915–1998), British Conservative Party politician
- Richard Grieve (born 1970), Australian actor
- Robert Grieve (town planner) (1910–1995) Scottish town planner
- Robert Cuthbert Grieve (1889–1957), Australian Victoria Cross recipient
- Tom Grieve (born 1948), American baseball player
- Walter B. Grieve (1850–1921), Newfoundland merchant and politician
- William Grieve (disambiguation)

== See also ==
- Greve (surname)
- Grieves (surname)
