= John Grieve =

John Grieve may refer to:

- John Grieve (VC) (1821–1863), Scottish recipient of the Victoria Cross award for gallantry
- John Grieve (actor) (1924–2003), Scottish actor
- John Grieve (poet) (1781–1836), Scottish poet
- John Grieve (politician) (1852–1920), English-born farmer, manufacturer and political figure in Ontario
- John Grieve (police officer) (born 1946), British retired police officer and university professor
- John Grieve (physician) (1753-1805) Scottish physician to the Russian royal family.
- John Grieve (Lord Provost) (d.1803), lord provost of Edinburgh
- John Grieve (footballer) (1879–1942), Australian rules footballer for St Kilda

== See also ==
- John Greaves (disambiguation)
