= Greve =

Greve may refer to:

== Places ==
- Greve (surname), includes a list of people with the name
- Grevë, a village in Albania
- Greve in Chianti, a town in Tuscany, Italy, at the center of the Chianti wine region
- Greve Lake, Chile
- Greve Municipality, a municipality in Region Sjælland on the island of Zealand, Denmark
  - Greve Strand, the municipal seat of Greve
  - Greve railway station, one of the railway stations in the Danish municipality
- Place de Greve, former name of Place de l'Hôtel-de-Ville, Paris, France

== Other uses ==
- Grevé, a Swedish cow's milk cheese
- Greve Fodbold, a Danish football club
- Greve Graphics, a defunct Swedish video game developer

== See also ==
- Greave (or greve), a piece of armour that protects the leg
- Greeves (disambiguation)
- Greve, Buhrlage, and Company
- Grieve (disambiguation)
