= Grieve (disambiguation) =

Grieve is a Peruvian automobile built by Juan Alberto Grieve in 1908.

Grieve or Grieves may also refer to:

- Grieve, to experience grief
- Grieve (in Scotland), a manager or steward
- Grieve (surname)
- 4451 Grieve, a Mars-crossing asteroid
- Grieves (born 1984), Seattle-base rapper

== See also ==
- Greave, a piece of armour that protects the leg
- Greaves (disambiguation)
- Grieves (disambiguation)
