= Greves =

Greves is a surname. Notable people with the surname include:

- Catherine Greves (born 1982), English rower
- Kent Greves (born 1968), Canadian volleyball player

== See also ==
- Greaves (surname)
- Greeves (surname)
- Greve (surname)
- Grieves (surname)
