= Robert Grieve =

Robert Grieve may refer to:

- Robert Grieve (VC) (1889–1957), Australian recipient of the Victoria Cross
- Robert Grieve (artist) (1924–2006), Australian painter, printmaker and art teacher
- Robert Grieve (town planner) (1910–1995), Scottish engineer, planner, poet, raconteur and visionary
- Bob Grieve (rugby union) (1911–2000), Scottish rugby union player
- Bob Grieve (footballer) (1884–1954), Scottish footballer
