= Grieveson =

Grieveson is a surname. Notable people with the surname include:

- Joy Grieveson (born 1941), British track and field athlete
- Koren Grieveson, Angolan American chef who has appeared on cooking television shows
- Mildred Grieveson (born 1936), British author of romance novels (pen name Anne Mather)
- Ronnie Grieveson OBE (1909–1998), South African cricketer
- Steven Grieveson (born 1970), British serial killer known as the Sunderland Strangler

== See also ==
- Grieveson Grant, stockbroking firm on the London Stock Exchange
- Graveson, commune in the Bouches-du-Rhône department in southern France
- Greeson, surname
- Grieve, Peruvian automobile built in 1908
- Grieves, stage name of Benjamin Howard Laub
