= William Groves =

William Groves may refer to:

- William Groves (educator) (1898–1967), Australian educator and public servant
- William F. Groves (1893–1963), American politician and farmer
- Willie Groves (1868–1908), Scottish international footballer

== See also ==
- William Graves (disambiguation)
- William Grove (disambiguation)
- Williams Grove (disambiguation)
