= John Greaves (disambiguation) =

John Greaves (1602–1652) was an English mathematician and antiquary.

John Greaves may also refer to:

- John Greaves (musician) (born 1950), British bass guitarist and composer
- John Edward Greaves (1846-1923), industrialist and British vice-consul at Berdiansk, Russian Empire.
- John Ernest Greaves (1847–1945), Welsh slate mine owner and Lord Lieutenant of Caernarvonshire
- John Whitehead Greaves (1807–1880), English businessman
- Johnny Greaves (boxer) (born 1979), English boxer
- Johnny Greaves (rugby league) (born 1943), Australian rugby player
- Johnny Greaves (racing driver) (born 1966), American racetrack driver

== See also ==
- John Grieve (disambiguation)
