= Grieves (disambiguation) =

Grieves (February 23, 1984) is an American hip hop artist.

Grieves may also refer to:

- Grieves (surname)

== See also ==
- Greaves (disambiguation)
- Greeves (disambiguation)
- Grieve (disambiguation)
