= Shrine of Remembrance =

War memorial in Melbourne, Victoria, Australia

- Shrine of Remembrance Trustees
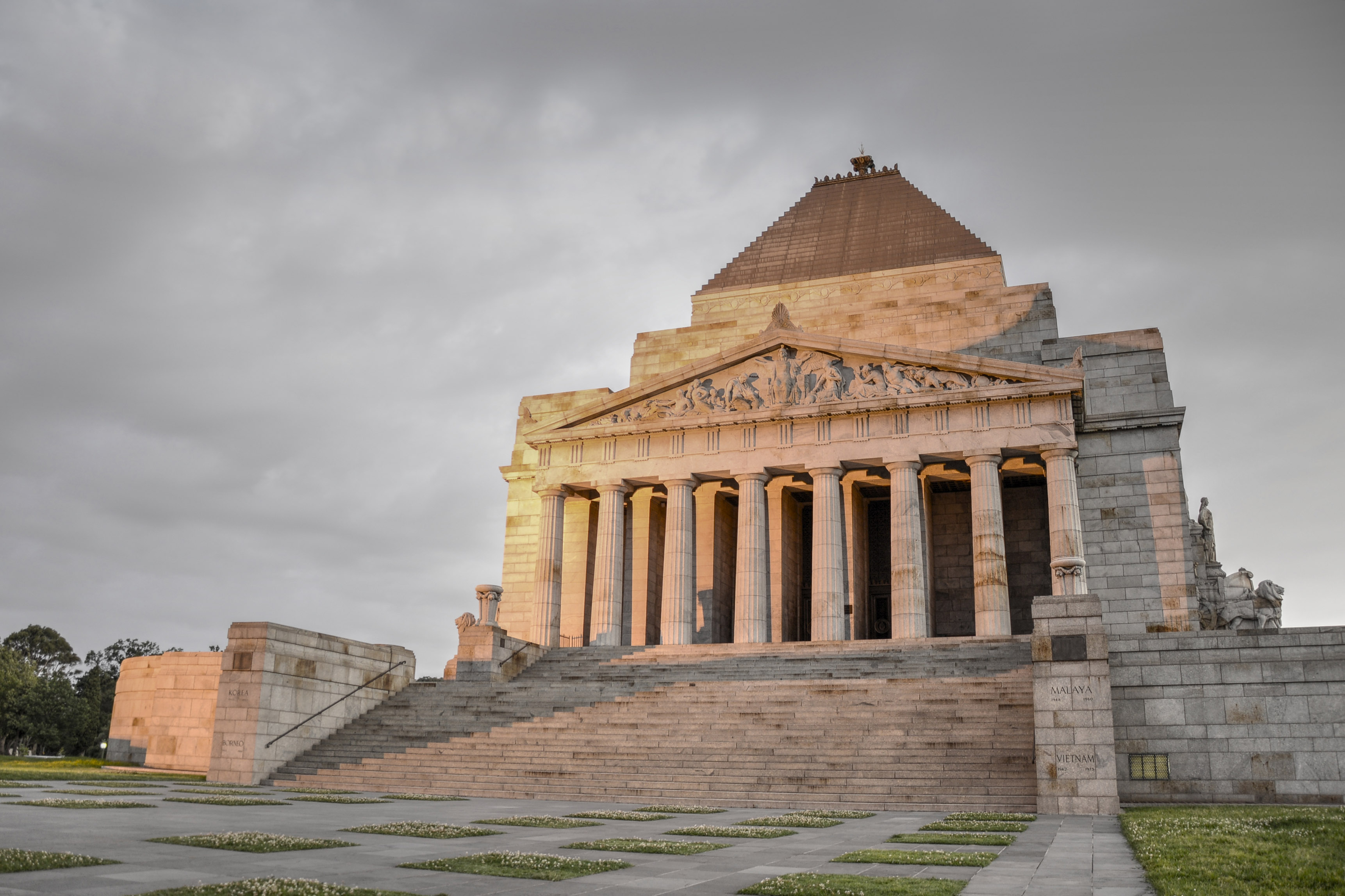
- Shrine of Remembrance
- For Australian soldiers of World War I and later
- Established: 1918; 108 years ago
- Unveiled: 11 November 1934; 92 years ago
- Location: 37°49′50.0″S 144°58′24.4″E; Birdwood Avenue, Melbourne, Victoria, Australia
- Designed by: Phillip Hudson and James Wardrop
- Website: www.shrine.org.au

Victorian Heritage Register
- Official name: Shrine of Remembrance
- Type: State Registered Place
- Criteria: a, c, d, e, g
- Designated: 14 December 1991; 34 years ago
- Reference no.: H0848
- Heritage Overlay number: HO489

The Shrine of Remembrance (commonly referred to as The Shrine) is a war memorial in Melbourne, Victoria, Australia, located in Kings Domain on St Kilda Road. It was built to honour the men and women of Victoria who served in World War I, but now functions as a memorial to all Australians who have served in any war. It is a site of annual observances for Anzac Day (25 April) and Remembrance Day (11 November), and is one of the largest war memorials in Australia.

Designed by architects Phillip Hudson and James Wardrop, both World War I veterans, the Shrine is in classical style, based on the Tomb of Mausolus at Halicarnassus and the Parthenon in Athens, Greece. The crowning element at the top of the ziggurat roof references the Choragic Monument of Lysicrates. Built from Tynong granite, the Shrine originally consisted only of the central sanctuary surrounded by the ambulatory. The sanctuary contains the marble Stone of Remembrance, upon which is engraved the words "Greater love hath no man" (John 15:13); once per year, on 11 November at 11 a.m. (Remembrance Day), a ray of sunlight shines through an aperture in the roof to light up the word "Love" in the inscription. Beneath the sanctuary lies the crypt, which contains a bronze statue of a soldier father and son, and panels listing every unit of the Australian Imperial Force.

The Shrine went through a prolonged process of development, which began in 1918 with an initial proposal to build a Victorian memorial. Two committees were formed, the second of which ran a competition for the memorial's design. The winner was announced in 1922. However, opposition to the proposal, led by Keith Murdoch and the Herald Sun, forced the governments of the day to rethink the design. A number of alternatives were proposed, the most significant of which was the Anzac Square and cenotaph proposal of 1926. In response, General Sir John Monash used the 1927 Anzac Day march to garner support for the Shrine, and finally won the support of the Victorian government later that year. The foundation stone was laid on 11 November 1927, and the Shrine was officially dedicated on 11 November 1934.

== History ==
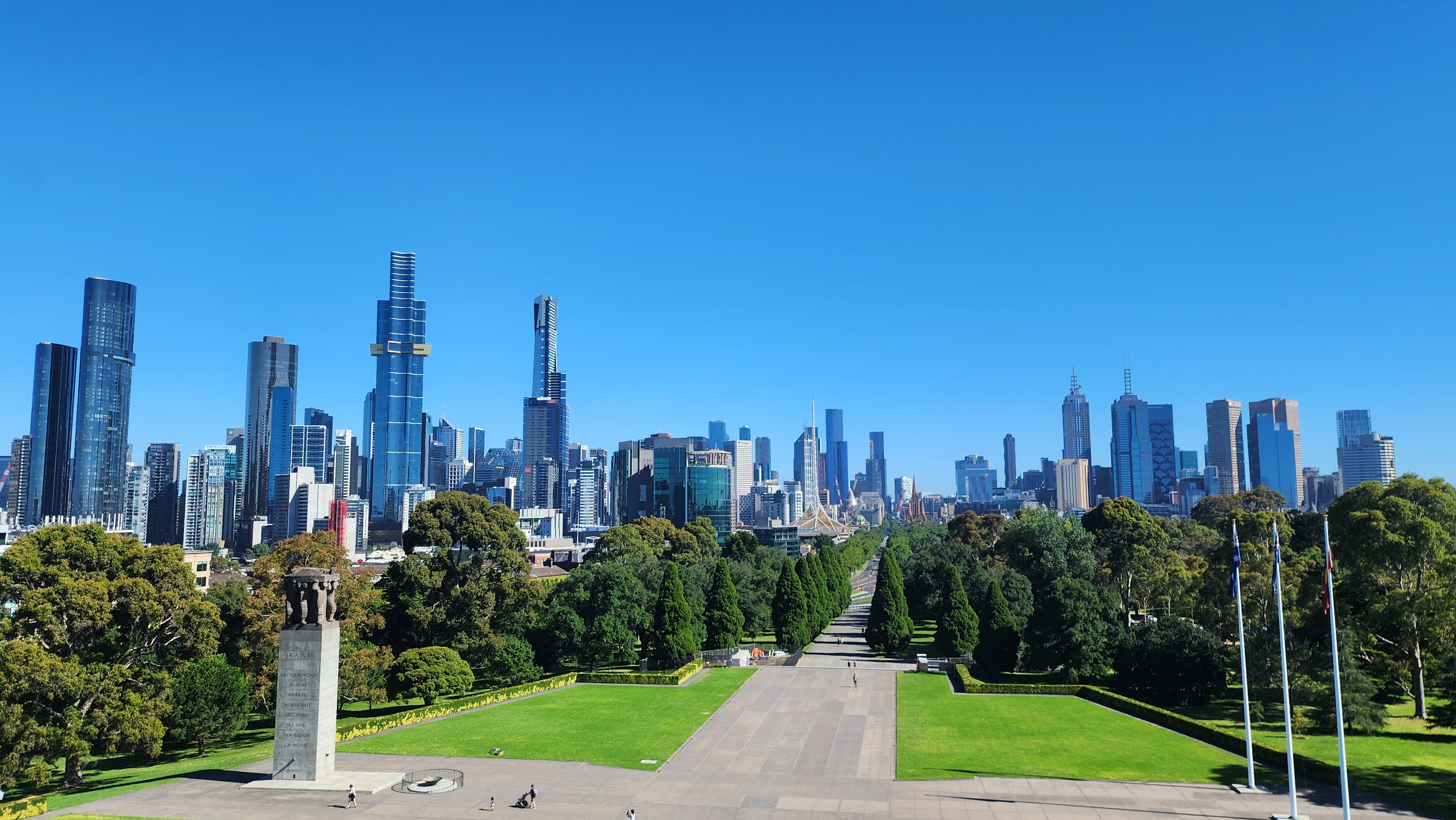
Ceremonial Avenue, looking towards the Melbourne central business district from the rooftop of the shrine

=== Conception: 1918–1922 ===
A war memorial in Melbourne was proposed as soon as the war ended in November 1918. In the early 1920s the Victorian state government appointed the War Memorials Advisory Committee, chaired by Sir Baldwin Spencer, which recommended an "arch of victory" over St Kilda Road, the major boulevard leading out of the city of Melbourne to the south. In August 1921 an executive committee was formed, with the former commander of the Australian forces in the war, General Sir John Monash, as its driving force. The committee soon abandoned the idea of an arch and proposed a large monumental memorial to the east of St Kilda Road, a position which would make it clearly visible from the centre of the city. A competition was launched in March 1922 to find a design for the new memorial, open both to British subjects residing in Australia and any Australian citizens who were residing overseas. A total of 83 entries were submitted, and in December 1923 the design offered by two Melbourne architects (and war veterans), Phillip Hudson and James Wardrop, was announced as the winner.

=== Opposition and response: 1922–1927 ===
Sir John Monash (left), one of the leading proponents for the Shrine, and Keith Murdoch (right) editor-in-chief of the Melbourne paper The Herald, a leading opponent who described the proposed Shrine as "a tomb of gloom".

The winning design had a number of supporters, including publications such as The Age and George Taylor's Sydney based trade journal, Building, prominent citizens including artist Norman Lindsay and University of Sydney Dean of Architecture, Leslie Wilkinson, and the Royal Australian Institute of Architects (who had been heavily involved in the competition). Nevertheless, the design was also fiercely criticised in some quarters—especially by Keith Murdoch's Herald, Murdoch reportedly describing the Shrine as "too severe, stiff and heavy, that there is no grace or beauty about it and that it is a tomb of gloom"—on the grounds of its grandiosity, its severity of design and its expense. As part of the campaign against the Shrine proposal, the Herald searched for alternative concepts, arguing that the funds could be better spent on more practical projects such as a hospital or a war widows' home. Furthermore, some Christian churches also attacked the design as pagan for having no cross or other Christian element.

The new Victorian Labor government of 1924, under George Prendergast, supported the Herald's view, and pushed for a memorial hospital instead of the Shrine. When the Labor government was replaced with John Allan's Country/National coalition, the plan changed once again, leaning towards the earlier suggestion of an arch of victory to be built over St Kilda Road. As a result of the debate, significant delays postponed the construction of the new memorial, so a temporary wood-and-plaster cenotaph was raised for the 1926 Anzac Day march. The success of the temporary cenotaph led the Victorian government to abandon the earlier project in 1926, and propose instead to build a permanent cenotaph in a large "ANZAC Square" at the top of Bourke St in front of Parliament House. While this would have involved demolishing the Windsor Hotel, one of Melbourne's favourite hotels, the new plan won the support of the Herald, the Returned Soldiers League (RSL) and the Melbourne City Council.

Nevertheless, both Monash and Legacy still supported the Shrine. After a vote in favour of the Shrine by their executive council, Legacy started a public relations campaign, gaining the support of much of the media—although the council, state government and the Herald continued to oppose. In 1927, with the then Duke of York, Prince Albert, visiting the country, Monash spoke on the eve of Anzac Day at the RSL dinner, arguing for the Shrine. The audience had been seeded with supporters, who provided a standing ovation at the conclusion of his speech, which helped to produce a groundswell of support. When a vote was called for, the majority voted in favour of the Shrine proposal. The next day, with Monash leading 30,000 veterans in the 1927 ANZAC Day march, and with the new support of the RSL, The Age and The Argus, the Shrine proposal had gained "new momentum". Faced with such support, and with Monash's arguments that the Anzac Square would be prohibitively expensive, Edmond Hogan's new Labor government decided in favour of the Shrine.

Another early point of contention (although not explicitly related to the nature of the memorial) concerned the possibility of incorporating a "Tomb of the Unknown Soldier" into the memorial—an approach that was championed by the St Kilda RSL, who revealed plans to bury a soldier from either Gallipoli or France on ANZAC Day, 25 April 1922. This proposal received considerable debate, and was countered by the argument that the Unknown Warrior in Westminster Abbey represented all of the dead of the British Empire. Monash was on the side of those against such a burial, as while he could see a place for an Unknown Soldier in a national memorial, he did not feel that it would be suitable at the Victorian Shrine. The Stone of Remembrance was later placed in the position where an Unknown Soldier might have been laid. An Australian Unknown Soldier was eventually interred at the Australian War Memorial by Prime Minister Paul Keating on 11 November 1993.

=== Construction and dedication: 1927–1934 ===
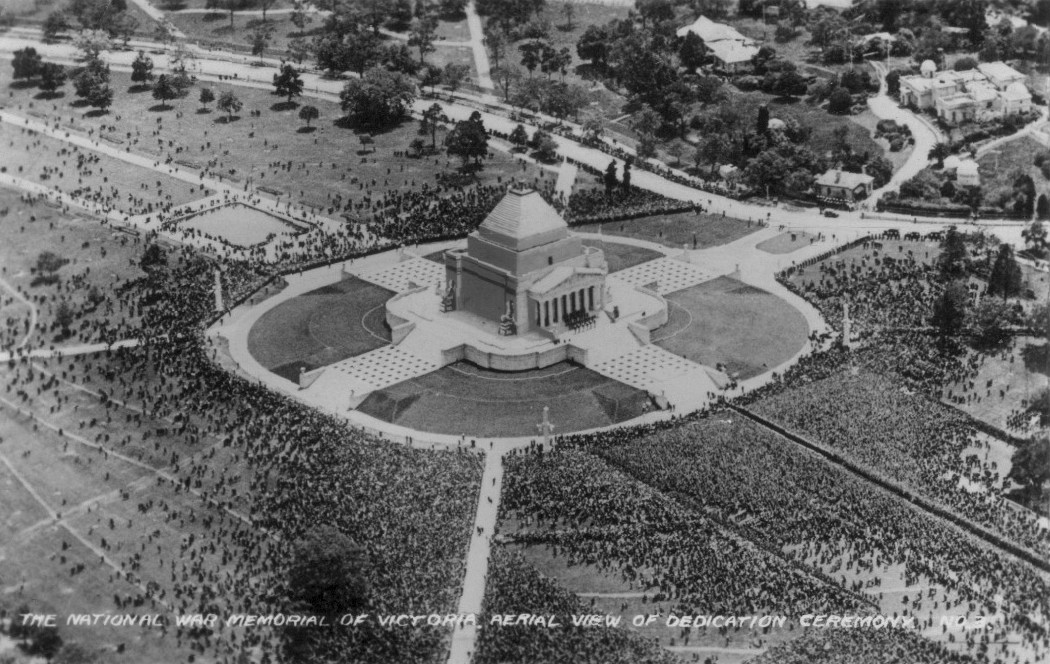
The dedication ceremony for the Shrine of Remembrance. Over 300,000 people were in attendance, approximately a third of Melbourne's population at the time.

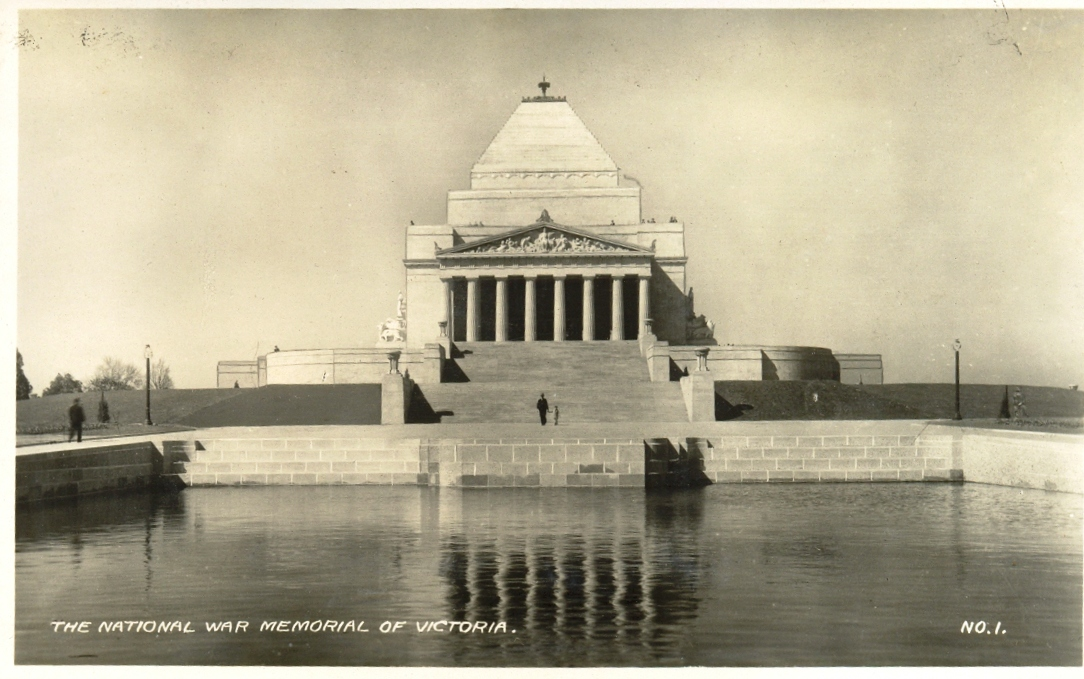
The Shrine in the 1930s showing the reflecting pool in front of the north face, where the World War II Forecourt is now located

The foundation stone was laid on 11 November 1927, by the Governor of Victoria, Lord Somers. Although both the Victorian and Commonwealth governments made contributions, most of the cost of the Shrine (£160,000 out of a total of £250,000; equating to about £14.6 million out of £22.7 million in 2022) was raised in less than six months by public contributions, with Monash as chief fundraiser.

Monash, who was also an engineer, took personal charge of the construction, which began in 1928 and was handled by the contractors Vaughan & Lodge. Monash died in 1931, before the Shrine was finished, but the Shrine was the cause "closest to his heart" in his later years.

Work was finally completed in September 1934, and the Shrine was formally dedicated on 11 November 1934 by the Duke of Gloucester, witnessed by a crowd of over 300,000 people—a "massive turnout" given that Melbourne's population at the time was approximately 1 million, and, according to Carl Bridge, the "largest crowd ever to assemble in Australia to that date". During World War II, the Shrine housed an air raid shelter and zig-zag trenches were dug on the grounds to protect civilians from bomb blasts.

=== Post World War II: 1945–1985 ===
After World War II it was felt necessary to add to the Shrine an element commemorating the Australian war dead of the second great conflict. Once again a competition was run, with A. S. Fall and E. E. Milston as the joint winners. Milston's design was eventually chosen as the one to go ahead, and the result was the World War II Forecourt, a wide expanse of stone in front of the Shrine's north face; the Eternal Flame, a permanent gas flame set just to the west of the north face; and the World War II Memorial, a 12.5-meter-high (41-foot) cenotaph a little further west. The Forecourt replaced a reflecting pool that had previously stood in front of the Shrine. These enlargements were dedicated by Queen Elizabeth II on 28 February 1954. Australia's involvements in later wars, such as the Korean War, the Borneo campaign (1945), the Malayan Emergency, the Indonesian Confrontation in North Borneo and Sarawak, the Vietnam War and the Gulf War, are commemorated by inscriptions.

In 1951 the body of Field Marshal Sir Thomas Blamey, Australia's military commander during World War II, was held at the Shrine for three days for public viewing followed by a State funeral on site. 20,000 people visited the Shrine as he lay in state.

During the Vietnam War the Shrine became a centre of conflict when anti-war demonstrators protested during ANZAC Day services against Australia's involvement in the war. In 1971 the Shrine was defaced when the word PEACE! was painted in large white letters on the pillars of the north portico.

In 1985 the Remembrance Garden was added beneath the western face of the Shrine to honour those who served during post-World War II conflicts.

=== Redevelopment: 2002–present ===
==== Visitor Centre and Garden Courtyard ====
Restoration work on the terraces surrounding the Shrine during the 1990s raised once again the possibility of taking advantage of the space under the Shrine: as the Shrine had been built on a hollow artificial hill, the undercroft (although at the time filled with rubble from the construction) provided a large space for development. At a planned cost of $5.5 million, the new development was intended to provide a visitor centre, administration facilities and an improved access to the Shrine's crypt, as many of the remaining veterans and their families found the stairs at the traditional ceremonial entrance difficult to climb. In redeveloping the site, special consideration was given to the positioning of the new entrance. The original plan was to use a tunnel from the east, but this was discarded as it had "no sense of ceremony". Instead it was decided to develop two new courtyards, and place the new gallery under the northern steps.

Construction commenced in 2002, with the design by Melbourne architects Ashton Raggatt McDougall, and the new areas were opened in August 2003. At the 2004 Victorian Architecture Awards the completed project was presented the Victorian Architecture Medal (highest award), the Melbourne Prize and the John George Knight Award for heritage architecture. Later in 2004 the project was also presented the Walter Burley Griffin Award for Urban Design by the Australian Institute of Architects at their annual national awards.

After construction was complete, there were still calls to further develop the site, and especially to provide facilities for education about the wars. A $62 million proposal was presented in 2006, incorporating a museum and an underground carpark. Designed once again by Ashton Raggatt McDougall, the proposal was opposed by local residents and some council members, and ran into significant funding problems when the Federal Government decided not to provide funding.

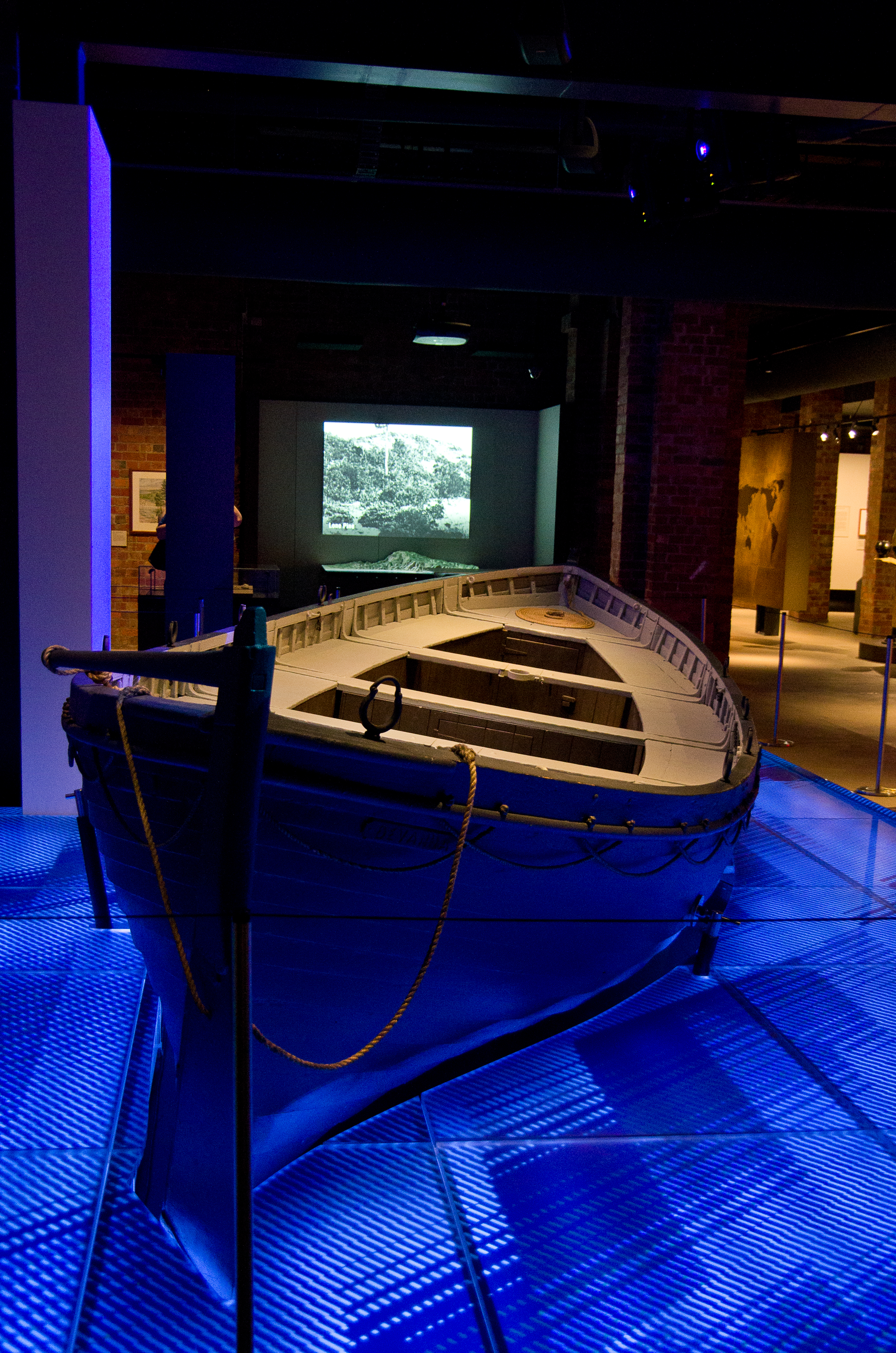
Lifeboat from the SS Devanha

==== Galleries of Remembrance ====
In 2012 the Victorian Government announced that $22.5 million would be allocated to redevelop the Shrine's undercroft and extend it to the south. The same architects used on the 2003 visitors centre, Ashton Raggatt Macdougall, were engaged to design the new extension. The new exhibition space, known as the 'Galleries of Remembrance', was opened on Remembrance Day in 2014. A lifeboat from the ship SS Devanha, deployed during the landing at Anzac Cove at the start of the Gallipoli Campaign in 1915, is a centrepiece of the new development.

The architecture of the Galleries project was highly awarded at the Victorian Architecture Awards in 2015, winning the Victorian Architecture Medal (highest award), the William Wardell Award for Public Architecture, the Melbourne Prize, John George Knight Award for heritage architecture and the Urban Design Architecture Award. Later in 2015 the project was also awarded the Sir Zelman Cowen Award for Public Architecture by the Australian Institute of Architects at the national architecture awards.

==== 2021 demonstration ====
On 22 September 2021, during the sixth lockdown associated with the COVID-19 pandemic, more than 1,000 demonstrators amassed at the Shrine of Remembrance as a place to gather and peacefully protest against mandatory COVID-19 vaccinations. The use of the war memorial for their protest was condemned, as was their behaviour at the event. In a statement, RSL Victoria said: "Under no circumstances, ever, should the Shrine be a place of protest. If any individuals or groups choose to express their political views, positions or ideological theories in the grounds of the Shrine at any time, they are completely disrespecting the sanctity of this time-honoured space." Demonstrators were eventually removed by Victoria Police officers who employed non-lethal rounds and tear gas.

== Architecture and features ==
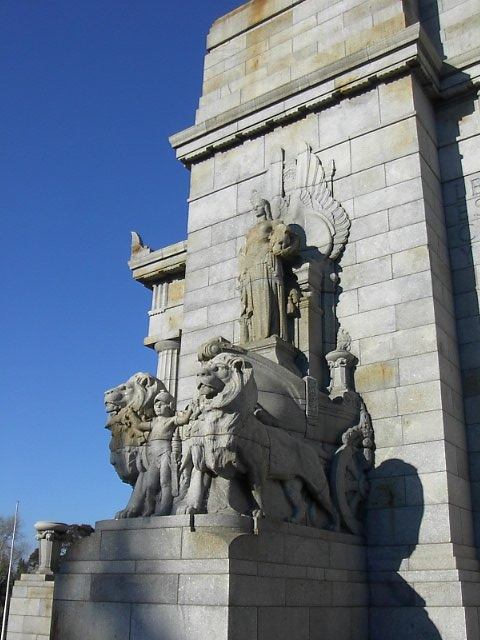
One of the four groups of statuary which mark the corners of the Shrine

Materials for building the Shrine were sourced from within Australia: the chosen building stone was granodiorite quarried from Tynong; the internal walls use sandstone from Redesdale; and the black marble columns used stone from Buchan. This raised some concerns when redeveloping the Shrine, as the Tynong quarry was no longer in use, and it proved to be prohibitively expensive to reopen the site. Fortunately another quarry in the area was available and was able to provide the necessary stone.

=== Exterior ===
The design of the Shrine is based on the ancient Mausoleum at Halicarnassus, one of the Seven Wonders of the World, and the Parthenon in Athens. It is a structure of square plan roofed by a stepped pyramid and entered on the north and south through classical porticos, each of eight fluted Doric columns supporting a pediment containing sculpture in high relief. The porticos are approached by wide flights of steps which rise in stages to the podium on which the Shrine sits. The east and west facing fronts are marked at the corners by four groups of statuary, representing Peace, Justice, Patriotism and Sacrifice.

Around the outer stone balustrade that marks the Shrine's external boundary are the 16 stone "battle honours" discs. These represent the battle honours granted by King George V and commemorate Australia's contributions to the following battles: Landing at Anzac (Gallipoli), Sari Bair, Rumani, Gaza-Beersheba, the North Sea, the Cocos Islands, Megiddo, Damascus, Villers-Bretonneux, Amiens, Mont St Quentin, the Hindenburg Line, Ypres, Messines, Pozieres and Bullecourt.

=== Interior ===
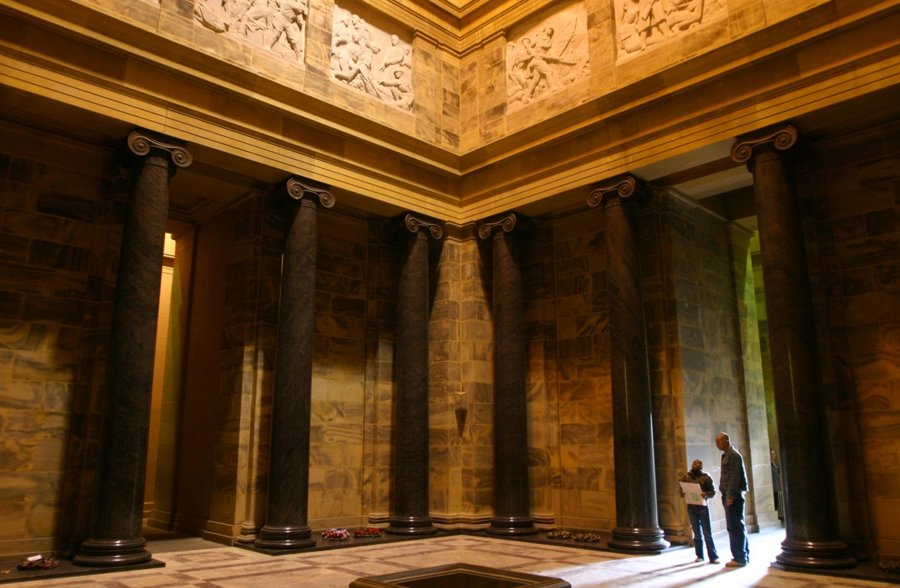
The Sanctuary

Inside the Shrine is the Sanctuary, a high vaulted space entered by four tall portals of Classical design. A simple entablature is carried on sixteen tall fluted Ionic columns and supports a frieze with twelve relief panels sculptured by Lyndon Dadswell, depicting the armed services at work and in action during World War I. At the centre of the Sanctuary is the Stone of Remembrance. This is a marble stone sunk below the pavement, so that visitors must bow their heads to read the inscription on it:

GREATER LOVE HATH NO MAN

The inscription is part of a verse from the Bible (John 15:13) "Greater love hath no man than this, that a man lay down his life for his friends." The Stone is aligned with an aperture in the roof of the Sanctuary so that a ray of sunlight falls on the word LOVE on the Stone of Remembrance at exactly 11 a.m. on 11 November, marking the hour and day of the Armistice which ended World War I. Since the introduction of daylight saving in Victoria, the ray of sunlight is no longer in the right place at 11 a.m. A mirror has been installed to direct sunlight onto the Stone at 11 a.m. During the rest of the year, a light is used to simulate the effect.

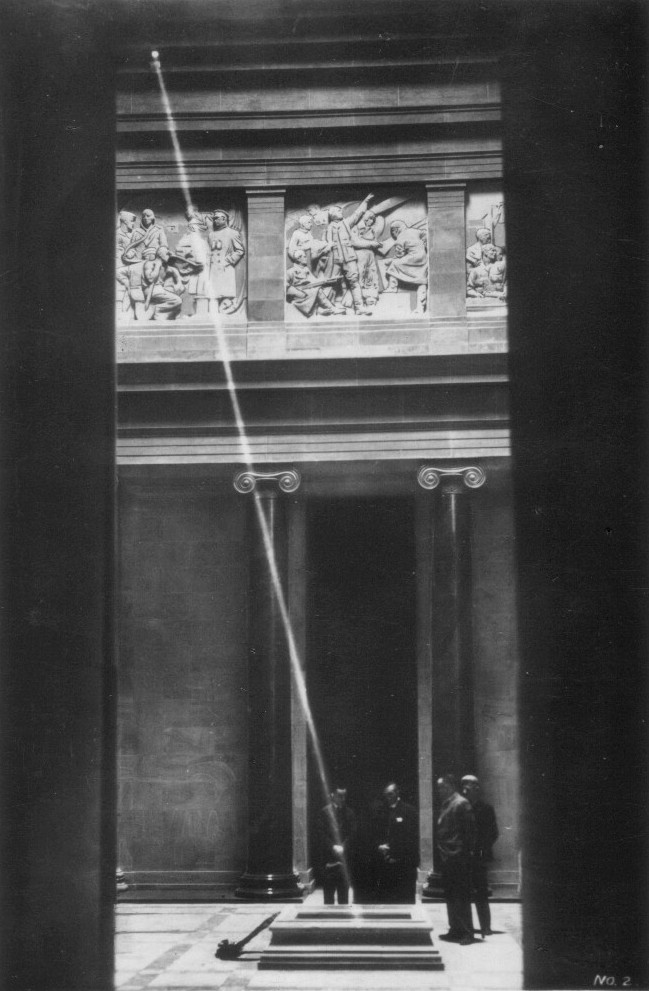
A ray of light hits the Stone of Remembrance in the Sanctuary, at 11am on 11 November. (photo circa 1940)

Monash, with the advice of Professor T. G. Tucker and the assistance of Bernard O'Dowd and Felix Meyer, reworded Phillip Hudson's inscription which appears on the western wall of the Shrine:

LET ALL MEN KNOW THAT THIS IS HOLY GROUND. THIS SHRINE, ESTABLISHED IN THE HEARTS OF MEN AS ON THE SOLID EARTH, COMMEMORATES A PEOPLE'S FORTITUDE AND SACRIFICE. YE THEREFORE THAT COME AFTER, GIVE REMEMBRANCE.

This inscription again aroused criticism, according to Taylor, "for having no Christian, (or, indeed, religious), element", but was considered to fit the Australian tradition of "stoic patriotism".

The inscription on the eastern wall, not written by Monash, reads:

THIS MONUMENT WAS ERECTED BY A GRATEFUL PEOPLE TO THE HONOURED MEMORY OF THE MEN AND WOMEN WHO SERVED THE EMPIRE IN THE GREAT WAR OF 1914–1918.

The Sanctuary is surrounded by an ambulatory, or passage, along which are forty-two bronze caskets containing hand-written, illuminated Books of Remembrance with the names of every Victorian who enlisted for active service with the Australian Imperial Force (AIF) or Australian Naval and Military Expeditionary Force in World War I or died in camp prior to embarkation.

=== Crypt ===
Beneath the Sanctuary is the Crypt containing a bronze statue of a father and son, representing the two generations who served in the two world wars. Around the walls are panels listing every unit of the AIF, down to battalion and regiment, along with the colours of their shoulder patch. The Crypt is hung with the standards of various battalions and regiments, listing their battle honours.

=== Visitor Centre ===
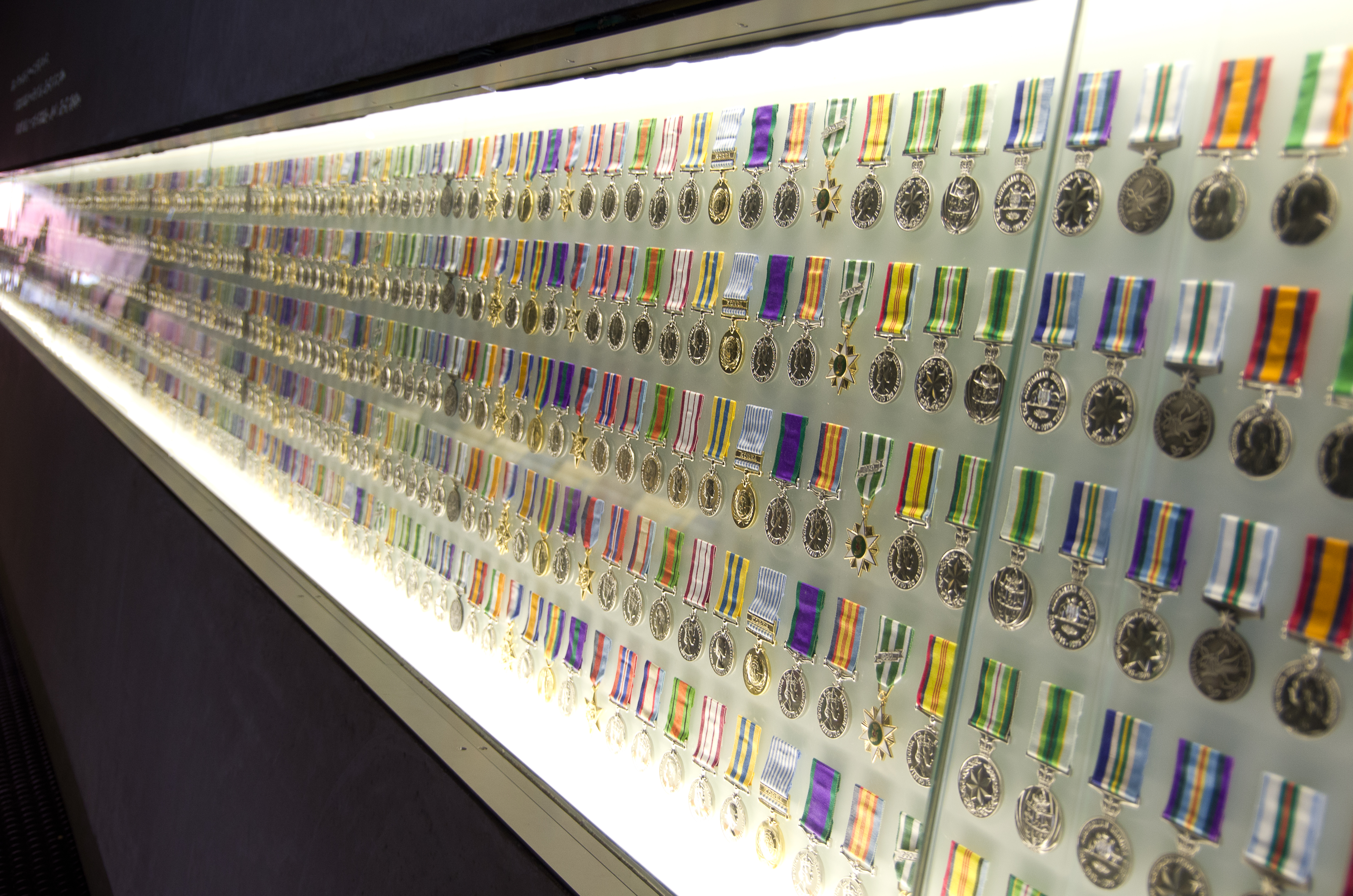
A section of the Gallery of Medals

Visitors approach the shrine through the Entrance Courtyard, with "Lest We Forget" inscribed on one wall and a quote from former Governor-General Sir William Deane on the other. The Garden Courtyard, on the same alignment, features the Legacy Olive Tree and a seating area. Both courtyards are finished in Tynong Granite.

The gallery of Medals has a 40-meter-long (130-foot) wall displaying around 4,000 medals, each symbolically representing 100 Victorians who have served in war and peacekeeping operations, and six who have died. A feature of the gallery is the Victoria Cross awarded to Captain Robert Grieve during the Battle of Messines in 1917. The Cross was lent to the Shrine by Wesley College, Melbourne.

=== World War II Forecourt ===
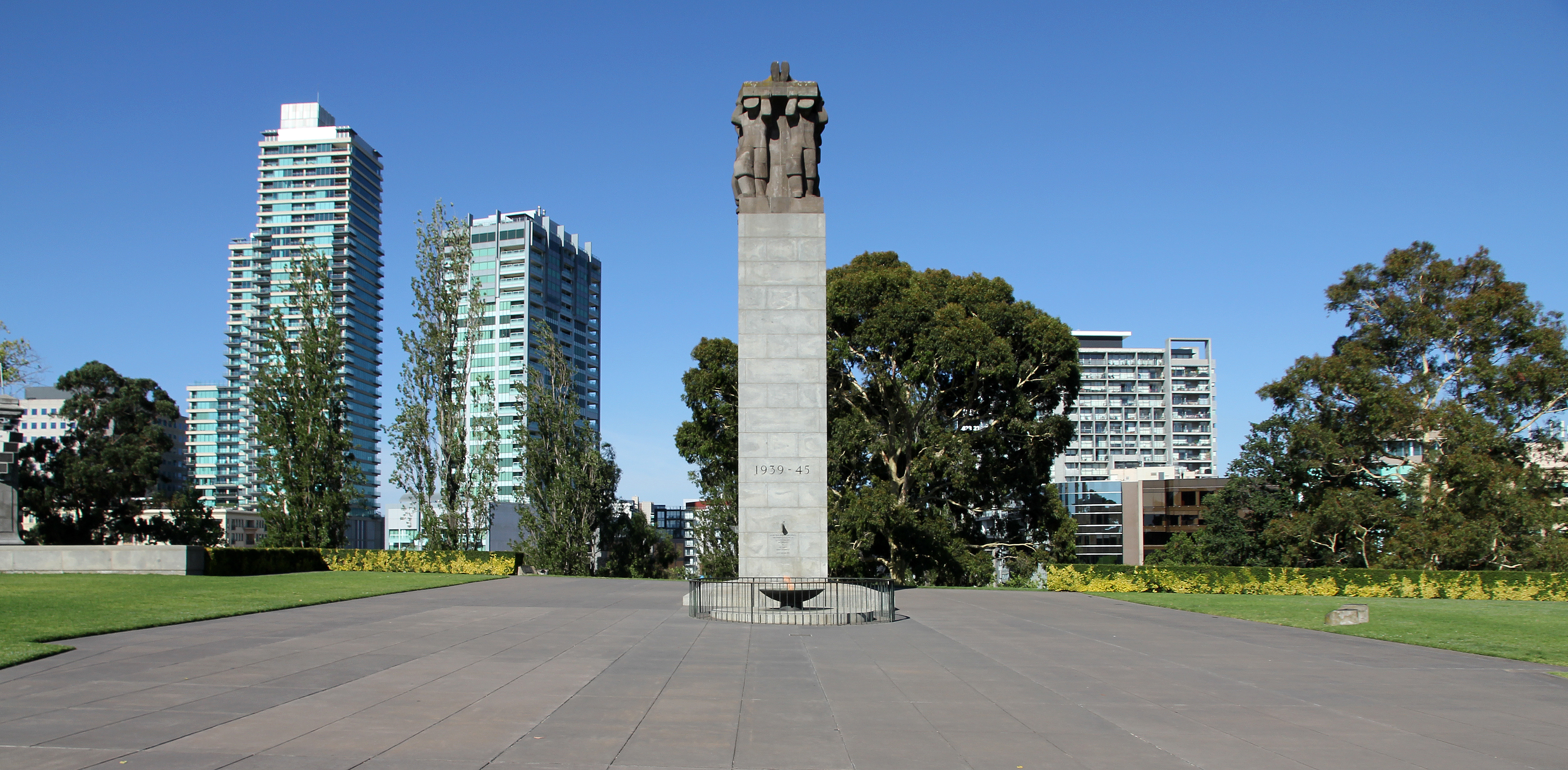
The Cenotaph and Eternal Flame

The cenotaph is a tall pillar constructed of Harcourt granite. Inscribed on its surface are the names of the defence forces, together with the theatres of war they served in. Atop the cenotaph is a basalt sculpture of six servicemen carrying a bier with a corpse, draped by the Australian flag. The sculpture symbolises "the debt of the living to the dead". The Eternal Flame is placed nearby, representing eternal life. The flame has burned continuously with few interruptions since it was first lit.

At the other side of the forecourt are three flagpoles. The usual arrangement comprises the Australian flag on the left, the Victorian flag in the middle and one of the flags of the three defence forces on the right. Other flags may be flown on special occasions, arranged according to strict protocols.

=== Remembrance Garden ===
The Remembrance Garden features a pool, waterfall and Harcourt granite wall bearing the names of the conflicts and peacekeeping operations in which Australia participated following World War II, such as Kuwait (Gulf War) and East Timor.

=== Shrine Reserve and environs ===
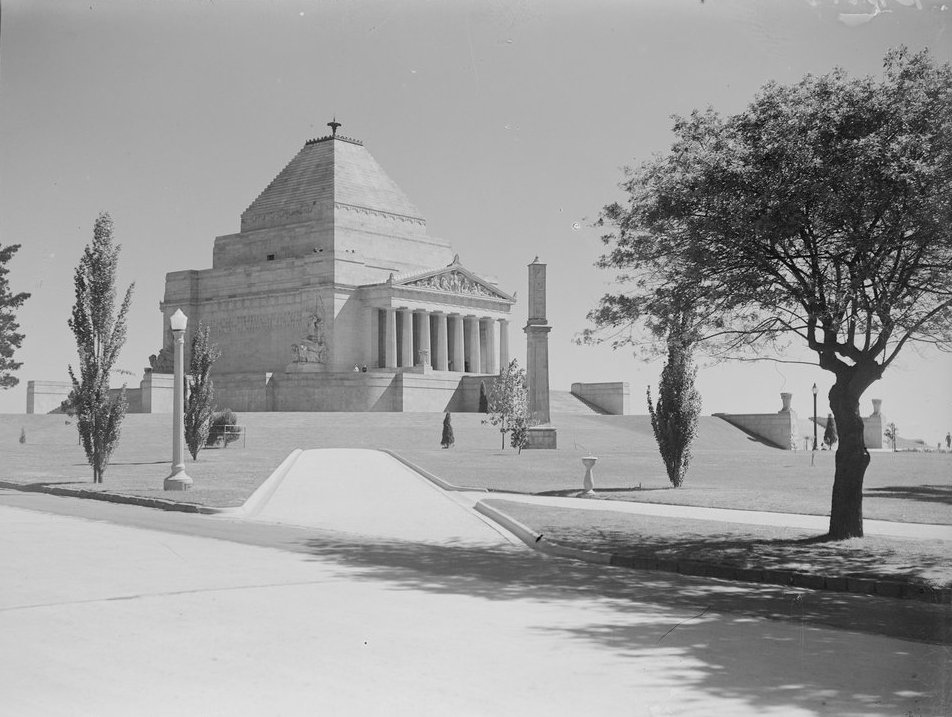
Shrine of Remembrance and surrounding parkland, c. 1940.

Although the original architects had proposed including four statues of war leaders, Monash rejected this plan. Instead there were to be no statues representing individual members of the Australian Defence Force at the shrine itself, although a number of statues were to be added in the surrounding parklands. The first of these was "The Man with the Donkey", representing John Simpson Kirkpatrick, although he was not named on the statue. Officially the work is said to represent the "valour and compassion of the Australian soldier". The statue, by Wallace Anderson, was installed in 1936 on the initiative of women who had funded a "Mother's Tribute". A statue of Monash was also commissioned and was designed by Leslie Bowles. Casting was due to begin in 1938, but the onset of World War II delayed work, and thus it was not installed until 1950, and, as with Simpson and his donkey, was located away from the shrine.

The Shrine is set in a large expanse of parkland officially called Kings Domain. Over the years many other war memorials have been built in this area, including the Australian-Hellenic Memorial to Australian and Greek dead in the Battles of Greece and Crete in 1941, and statues of Monash and Blamey. Most of the trees which line the approaches to the Shrine bear plaques commemorating individual Army units, naval vessels or Air Force squadrons, placed there by veterans' groups. An older memorial to Victorians killed in the Second Boer War of 1899–1902 is also located nearby on the corner of St Kilda and Domain Roads.

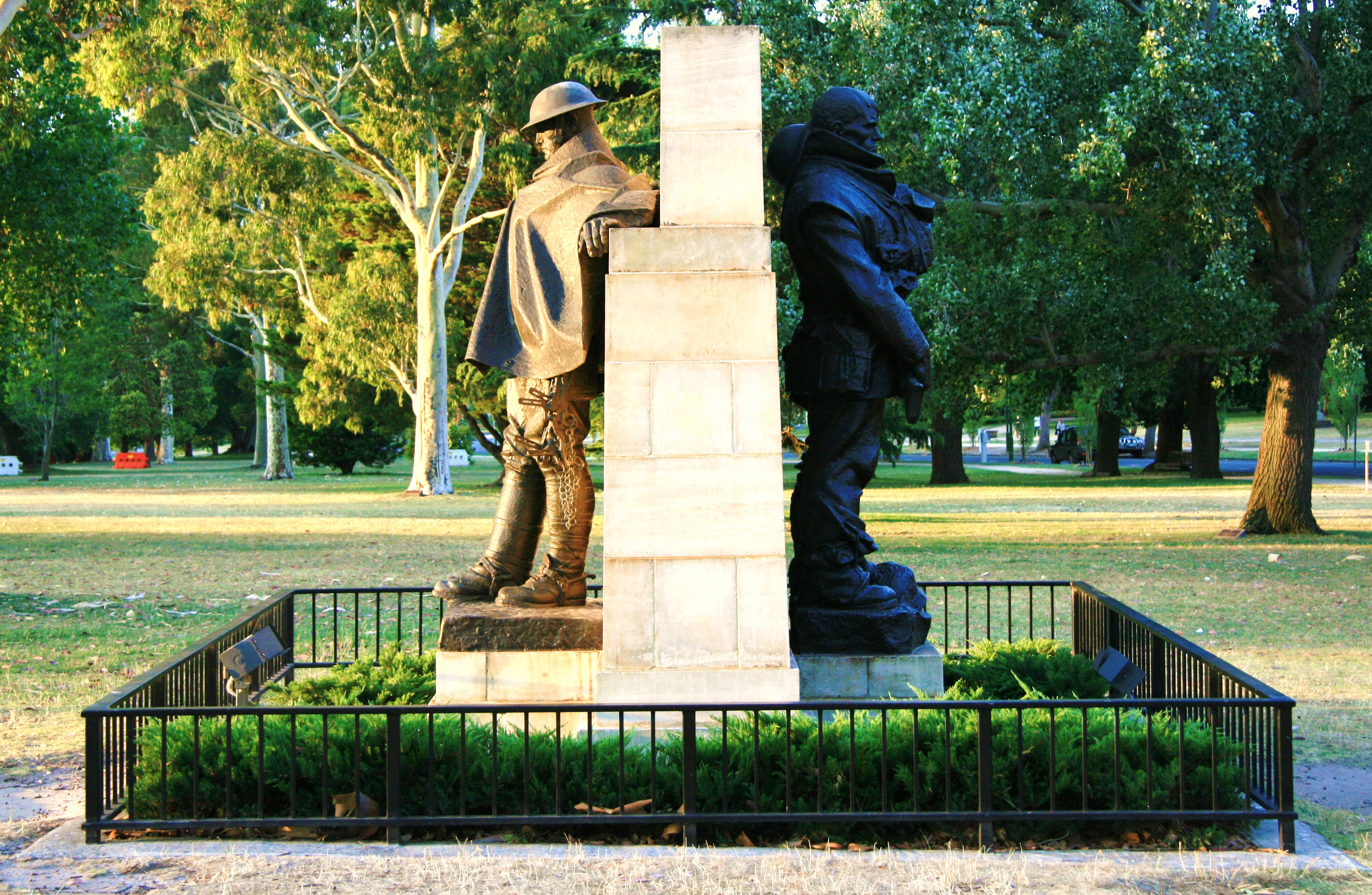
The Driver and Wipers Memorial

The Driver and Wipers Memorial, also in the Shrine reserve, commemorates the thousands of Australian lives lost during the fighting at Ypres; "Wipers" is the way servicemen pronounced "Ypres" during World War I. The bronze soldiers are the work of the British sculptor Charles Sargeant Jagger and originally stood outside the Museum and State Library of Victoria in Melbourne. They were transferred to the Shrine in 1998. The Driver is a soldier holding a horse whip and bridles, wearing breeches, a protective legging, spurs, and a steel helmet. The figure is a recasting of one of the figures from the Royal Artillery Memorial in Hyde Park, London, England. The other bronze, the "Wipers" figure, is a British infantry soldier standing guard with standard issue .303 rifle, bayonet fixed, a German helmet at his feet. This too is a recasting, taken from the Hoylake and West Kirby War Memorial in Merseyside, England.

On 19 July 2008, being the 92nd anniversary of the Battle of Fromelles, a replica of the 1998 sculpture by Peter Corlett in the Australian Memorial Park, Fromelles was unveiled. This depicts Sergeant Simon Fraser, 57th Battalion, (from Byaduk), rescuing a wounded compatriot from no man's land after the battle.

Near to the Shrine entrance is the Legacy Garden of Appreciation, which was established in 1978. This cross-shaped garden is outlined by hedges. Red Flanders Poppies, planted from seed originating from Villers-Bretonneux in France, flower in late spring. A sculpture by Louis Laumen, Widow and Children, was commissioned to mark the 75th anniversary of Legacy Australia in 1998. The Women's Garden, to the north of the shrine, incorporates concrete memorial violets within a grove of jacarandas. The focus of the garden is The Ex-Servicewomen's Memorial Cairn (1985) which was relocated from the King's Domain in 2010.

A Lone Pine (Pinus brutia) was planted in 1933 near the north-east corner of the Shrine by Lieutenant-General Sir Stanley Savige, founder of Melbourne Legacy at a formal ceremony. It was one of four seedlings planted in Victoria from seeds of a cone brought back from Gallipoli by Sgt. Keith McDowell. The tree was removed in August 2012 having succumbed to disease caused by the fungus Diplodia pinea. A "grandchild tree" was planted nearby in 2006.

== Commemorative services ==
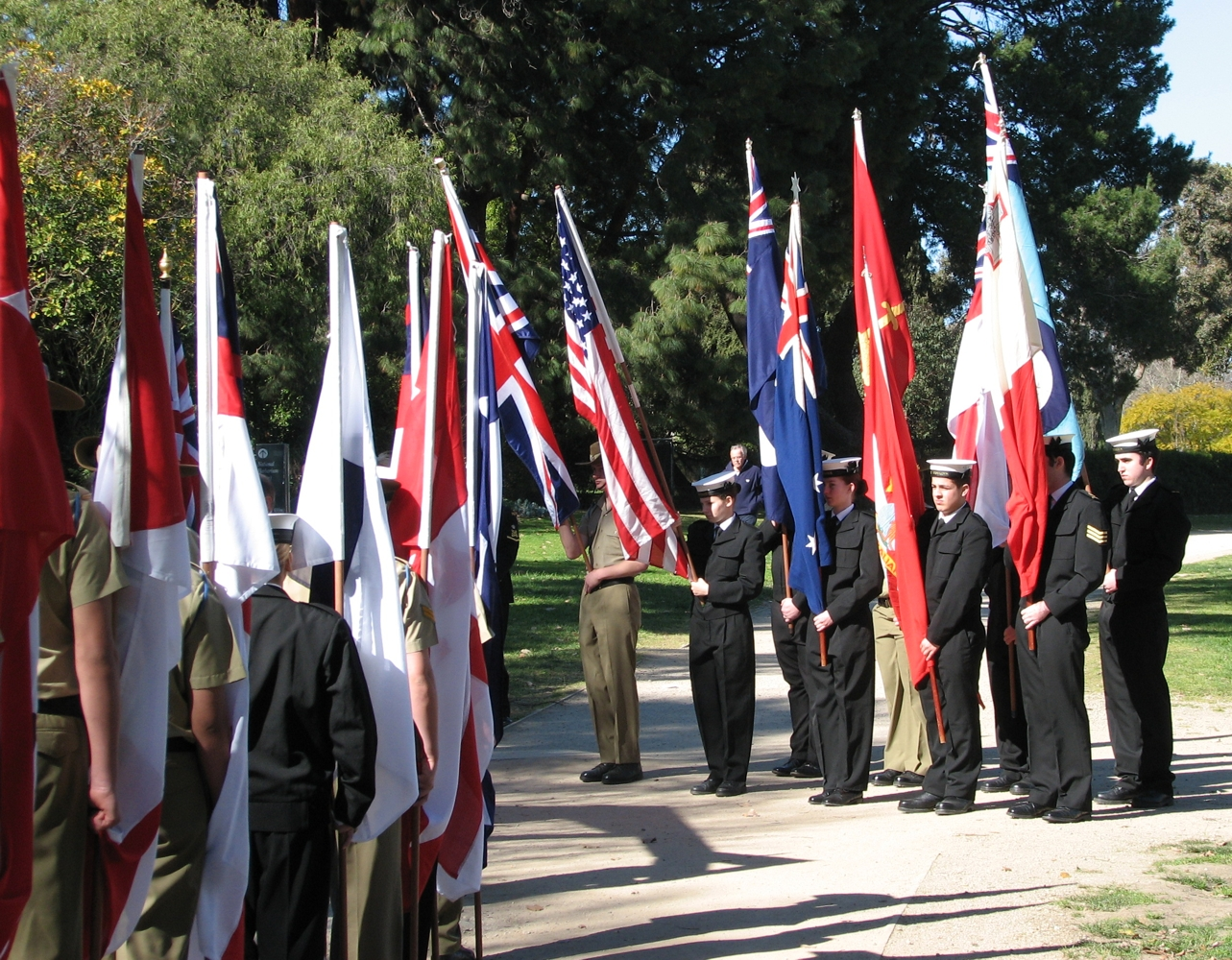
A parade during a ceremony commemorating Operation Pedestal near the Shrine

Since its dedication in 1934, the Shrine has been the centre of war commemoration in Melbourne. Although Remembrance Day (11 November) is the official day for commemorating the war dead, it has gradually been eclipsed in the public estimation by Anzac Day (25 April), which unlike Remembrance Day is a specifically Australian (and New Zealand) day of commemoration and a public holiday in both nations. Anzac Day at the Shrine is observed through a number of ceremonies. The first of these is the Dawn Service, an event that attracted a record crowd of more than 35,000 in 2007. This is followed by an official wreath-laying service where officials march to the Shrine and lay wreaths in the Sanctuary. Later, the Anzac Day March approaches the Shrine via St Kilda Road and the forecourt, before being dismissed at the steps and is followed by a commemoration service held between 1 and 1:30pm.

On Remembrance Day, Victorian leaders and community members gather "to remember those men and women who have died or suffered in all wars, conflicts and peace operations". A minute's silence is observed at 11am as the Ray of Light illuminates the word LOVE on the Stone of Remembrance.

Throughout the rest of the year, ceremonies and wreath laying services are held by Victorian unit associations and battalions in the Sanctuary, around memorials in the Shrine Reserve and near remembrance trees specific to various associations.

== Management ==
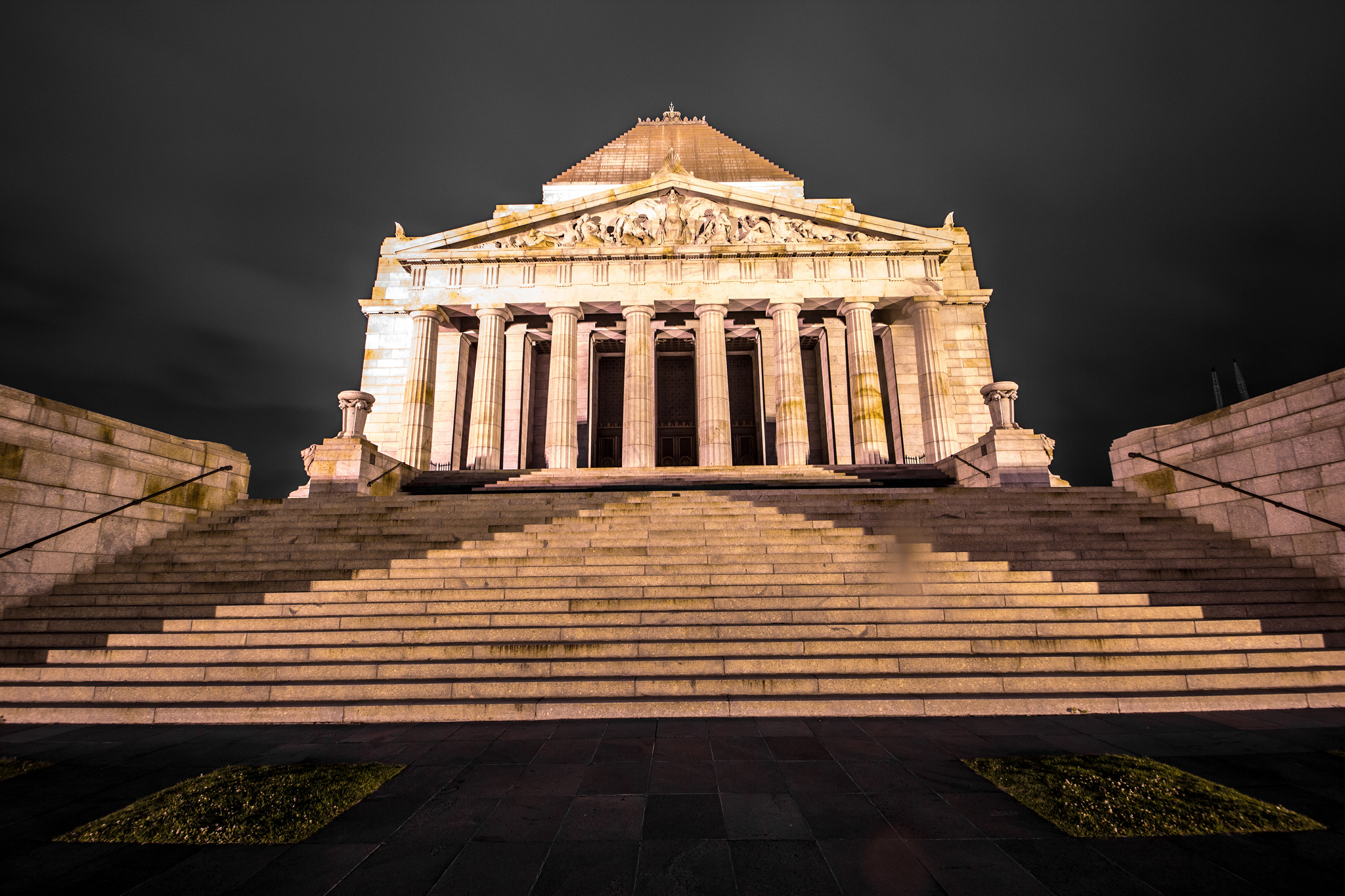
The Shrine of Remembrance at night

The Shrine is managed by the Shrine of Remembrance Trustees, ten individuals appointed by the Governor in Council, on the advice of the Minister for Veterans' Affairs in the Victorian Government. The Trustees are responsible for the care, management, maintenance and preservation of the Shrine and Shrine Reserve.

Traditionally, security for the Shrine has been provided by the Shrine Guard, whose members were men with a military background. All of the original twelve members of the Shrine Guard had won bravery medals during World War I. When the Shrine Guard merged with Victoria Police Protective Service, some civilians began to serve. During the hours the Shrine is open to the public or in use for any ceremony, they wear a uniform representing an Australian Light Horseman of World War I, with Victoria Police insignia.

== See also ==
Other Anzac articles

- Australian and New Zealand Army Corps, the name used to describe the combination of the Australian and New Zealand Army Corps during wartime
- Anzac Cove, a small cove on the Gallipoli peninsula in Turkey.
- Anzac Day, a public holiday in Australia and New Zealand on 25 April every year to commemorate the landing at Gallipoli
- Anzac spirit, a component of modern Australasian mythology describing the spirit of mateship and cheerful stoicism amongst Australians and New Zealanders
