= Thomas Greaves =

Thomas, Tom or Tommy Greaves may refer to:

- Thomas Greaves (musician) (fl. 1604)
- Thomas Greaves (orientalist) (1613–1676)
- Thomas Greaves (footballer) (1888–1960), English football forward with Stoke 1908–11
- Tommy Greaves (1893–1954), English football full back with Bury and Darlington 1911–28
- Tom Greaves (born 1986), English footballer
