= Williams Grove (disambiguation) =

Williams Grove is a historic home located at Berlin, Maryland, United States.

Williams Grove may also refer to:

- Williams Grove, Pennsylvania
- Williams Grove School, North Carolina

== See also ==
- William Grove (disambiguation)
- William Groves (disambiguation)
