= Greeves (surname) =

Greeves is a surname. Notable people with the name include:

- Augustus Greeves (1806–1874), Australian politician
- Bert Greeves (1906–1993), British engineer
- Carji Greeves (1903–1963), Australian rules footballer
- Ernie Greeves (1873–1946), Australian rules footballer
- Marion Greeves (1894–1979), Northern Irish politician
- Stuart Greeves (1897–1989), British Indian Army officer
- Ted Greeves (1878–1935), Australian rules footballer
- Teri Greeves (born 1970), Kiowa and American beadwork artist

== See also ==
- Greaves (surname)
- Greves, surname
- Grieves (surname)
