= Greve (surname) =

Greve is a surname. Notable people with the name include:

- Aleida Greve (1670–1740), Dutch painter
- Arent Greve (1733–1808), Norwegian painter and goldsmith
- Bredo Greve (1871–1931), Norwegian architect
- Bob Greve (born 1930), Australian footballer
- Carl-Heinz Greve (1920–1998), German military aviator
- Carsten Greve (born 1965), Danish academic
- Cecilie Greve (born 1992), Danish handball player
- Ellen Greve (born 1957), Australian self-help writer
- Hanne Sophie Greve (born 1952), Norwegian judge
- Henrich Rollef Greve (born 1966), Norwegian professor
- Jan Greve, Norwegian psychiatrist
- Jan Einar Greve (1933–2022), Norwegian lawyer
- Karsten Greve (born 1946), German art dealer
- Mathias Sigwardt Greve (1832–1912), Norwegian physician
- Michael Greve, American academic
- Otto Heinrich Greve (1908–1968), German politician
- Sydney Greve (1925–2015), two-time Anglo-Indian Olympic Boxer & flyweight champion of India
- Tim Greve (1928–1986), Norwegian historian, civil servant, diplomatist, newspaper editor and biographer
- Vivian Greve (born 1946), South African cricketer

== See also ==
- Grieve (surname)
- Greves, surname
