= Greaves =

Greaves may refer to:

- Greave, armour that protects the leg (military)
- Greaves (crater), a lunar crater near the southwest edge of Mare Crisium
- Greaves (food), an edible by-product of the rendering process
- Greaves (surname), people with the surname

== See also ==
- Greeves (disambiguation)
- Grieves (disambiguation)
