= Matthew Guthrie =

Scottish physician, mineralogist and traveller

The Honourable Matthew Guthrie FRS FRSE FSA

Personal details
- Born: 1743 Edinburgh, Scotland
- Died: 30 August 1807 (aged 63–64) Saint Petersburg, Russia
- Occupation: Physician, mineralogist, traveller

Matthew Guthrie (1743 – 30 August 1807) was a Scottish physician, mineralogist and traveller who rose to be councillor to the Russian royal family. He made extensive studies of Russian history and folklore, and did much to foster international relationships between Russia and Scotland and promote Russian culture. He was one of the founders of the Royal Society of Edinburgh.

His life closely paralleled that of Dr John Grieve and they were undoubtedly acquainted and probably friends. He was also a friend of John Howard who had also visited Russia.

== Life ==
He was born in Edinburgh in 1743, son of Henry (Harie) Guthrie, 9th Baron Haukerton (Halkerton) (1709–1794) and Rachel (née Milne, 1719–1746), and grandson of Rev Gideon Guthrie of Fetteresso and later Bishop of Brechin. His mother died when he was young. His father abandoned his title as Baron in 1747 following the Jacobite Rising of 1745 to avoid ill-feeling. His father remarried, to Elizabeth Tytler of Woodhouselee, younger sister of William Tytler. The family lived in the Nicholson area of Edinburgh, where the father worked as a lawyer in "Durie's Office".

Guthrie attended the High School in Edinburgh then studied medicine at the University of Edinburgh. He matriculated in 1764, there is no record of his graduation. He does appear to have trained as a surgeon. He went to Russia in 1769 and stayed there for most of his life. His initial role was as physician to the 1st and 2nd Imperial Corps of Noble Cadets in Saint Petersburg. He was granted an MD in Saint Petersburg in 1776. He later became a personal Councillor to both Tsar Alexander I and his wife, Empress Elizabeth.

In 1782 he was elected a Fellow of the Royal Society of London. In 1783 he was a Founding Fellow of the Royal Society of Edinburgh.

He died in Saint Petersburg, Russia on 30 August 1807.

== Family ==
He was married to Marie or Maria Dunant (of French descent and sometimes called Marie de Romaud-Survesnes) on 31 May 1781 at the British Chaplaincy in Saint Petersburg in Russia. She had previously directed a convent school responsible for educating the female nobility of Russia. They had two daughters, Anastasia Jessie Guthrie (1782–1855) and Mary Elizabeth Guthrie (1789–1850). Anastasia married 59-year-old Charles Gascoigne in 1797 when she was 15.

Following Gascoigne's death in 1809 she married Thomson Bonar of Campden. Their daughter Anastasia Bonar (1812–1857) was the second wife of her cousin, Patrick Fraser Tytler.

Guthrie's second daughter, Mary Elizabeth, married General Sir James Hay KCH.

Guthrie's older sister Euphan married Charles Wright and was mother-in-law to Professor John Robison.

== Publications ==
- Original Anecdotes of Peter the Great (1793)
- Dissertation on the Antiquities of Russia (1795)
- Noctes Russicae - Russian Evening Recreations

== Literature ==
- Anthony Glenn Cross: By the Banks of the Neva
- K.A. Papmehl: Matthew Guthrie -- The Forgotten Student of 18th Century Russia (1969)
