= Greeves =

Greeves may refer to:

- Greeves (motorcycles), British motorcycle manufacturer
- Greeves (surname), includes a list of people with the name

== See also ==
- Greeve (Old French for Greave), a piece of armour that protects the leg
- Greaves (disambiguation)
- Greve (disambiguation)
- Grieves (disambiguation)
