= Groves (surname) =

Groves is a surname. Notable people with the surname include:

- The Groves family, a British theatre family
- Allene Wilson Groves (1896–1986), American civic leader
- Andrew Groves, British fashion designer
- Anthony Norris Groves, British missionary
- Cady Groves (1989–2020), American singer-songwriter
- Charles Groves, British actor
- Charles Groves, British conductor
- Colin Groves (1942–2017), Australian primatologist
- Cornelia Groves, American preservationist (1926–2021)
- Don Groves, Australian journalist for IF Magazine
- Eddy Groves, Australian businessman
- Fred Groves, British actor
- Frederick Groves (disambiguation)
- George Groves (boxer), English boxer
- Harold Groves (1897–1969), American politician
- Herbert Stanley "Bert" Groves, Aboriginal Australian activist in the Aboriginal-Australian Fellowship and Aborigines Progressive Association
- Herta Groves, British hat designer
- James Grimble Groves (1854–1914), British brewer and politician
- Jennifer Choe Groves, American Federal Judge
- Jessica Groves (b. 1979), American murderer
- John Groves (disambiguation)
- Junius George Groves (1859–1925), American farmer and businessman
- Ken Groves (1921–2002), English footballer
- Kristina Groves (b. 1976), Canadian speed skater
- Lafayette Washington Groves (1834–1872)), American newspaper editor
- Leslie Groves (1896–1970), American general who managed the Manhattan Project
- Leslie Groves (cricketer) (1911–1990), New Zealand cricketer
- Martin Groves, British hillclimb driver
- Mike Groves, Cricketer
- Naomi Jackson Groves (1910–2001), Canadian painter and linguist
- Paul Groves (footballer) (b. 1966), English footballer
- Paul Groves (tenor) (b. 1964), American opera singer
- Perry Groves (b. 1965), English footballer
- Ricky Groves (b. 1968), British actor
- Robert Groves, British Royal Navy and Royal Air Force officer
- Ronald Groves, English educationalist and academic
- Sara Groves, American singer-songwriter
- Shaun Groves, American singer-songwriter
- Stephen W. Groves, American naval flyer
- Vic Groves, English footballer
- Walter Groves (1856–1906), British comedian
- William P. Groves (1893–1963), American politician
- Willie Groves, Scottish footballer
- Tori Groves-Little (born 2000), Australian rules footballer

== See also ==
- Grove (disambiguation)
