= William Grieve =

William Grieve may refer to:

- Percy Grieve (William Percival Grieve, 1915–1998), British politician
- Bill Grieve (1900–1979), American baseball umpire
- William Grieve (bridge) (1929–2017), American bridge player
- William Robertson Grieve, Lord Grieve (1917–2005), Scottish judge
- William Grieve (painter) (1800–1844), English scene-painter

== See also ==
- William Greaves (disambiguation)
- William Greive (1888–1916), Scottish cricketer and British Army soldier
