= William Greaves (disambiguation) =

William Greaves was an American filmmaker.

William Greaves may also refer to:

- William Greaves (mayor), Lord Mayor of Nottingham 1663-1664
- William Greaves, creator of Greaves' Rules
- William Greaves (MP) (died by 1621), Sheriff of Nottingham 1582 and MP for Nottingham (UK Parliament constituency) 1601
- William Greaves (cricketer) (1830-1869), Australian cricketer
- William Michael Herbert Greaves, Scottish astronomer

== See also ==
- William Graves (disambiguation)
- William Grieve (disambiguation)
