= William Grove =

William Grove may refer to:

- William Grove (16th-century MP), MP for Shaftesbury
- William Barry Grove (1764–1818), U.S. Congressman from North Carolina
- William Bywater Grove (1848–1938), English botanist and microbiologist
- William Chaffin Grove, British Member of Parliament for Shaftesbury, 1768–1774, and Weymouth and Melcombe Regis, 1774–1781
- William Grove (1702–1767), British Member of Parliament for Coventry, 1741–1761
- William Remsburg Grove (1872–1952), American soldier and recipitent of the Medal of Honor
- William Robert Grove (1811–1896), Welsh judge and scientist; inter alia pioneer in fuel cells and concepts of conservation of energy.

== See also ==
- William Groves (disambiguation)
- Williams Grove (disambiguation)
