= William Graves =

William Graves may refer to:

- William Graves (judge) (born 1935), Associate Justice of the Kentucky Supreme Court
- William Graves (MP) (1724–1801), who sat for East Looe and West Looe in the British Parliament
- William Carey Graves (1895–1966), American politician from Texas
- William D. Graves (1937–2025), American politician from Oklahoma
- William J. Graves (1805–1848), American politician from Kentucky
- William P. Graves, former North Carolina football coach
- William S. Graves (1865–1940), U.S. general and commander of the Siberia expedition
- Will Graves, (born 1988) American basketball player
- Bill Graves (born 1953), Governor of Kansas

== See also ==
- William Graves Sharp (1859–1922), U.S. lawyer, congressman and diplomat
- William Greaves (disambiguation)
