= Vivian Greve =

South African cricketer

Personal information
- Full name: Vivian Stanley Greve
- Born: 27 July 1946 (age 80); Johannesburg, Transvaal, South Africa
- Batting: Right-handed
- Bowling: Right-arm leg-spin
- Role: All-rounder

Domestic team information
- Years: Team
- 1967–68 to 1974–75: Transvaal

Career statistics
Competition	FC	List A
Matches	49	1
Runs scored	2,056	30
Batting average	26.35	30.00
100s/50s	2/10	0/0
Top score	185*	30
Balls bowled	6,894	–
Wickets	108	–
Bowling average	28.09	–
5 wickets in innings	2	–
10 wickets in match	0	–
Best bowling	7/71	–
Catches/stumpings	41/–	1/–
- Source: Cricinfo, 11 April 2026

Vivian Stanley Greve (born 27 July 1946) is a former South African cricketer who played first-class cricket in South Africa from 1967–68 to 1974–75.

== Cricket career ==
Greve was born in Johannesburg, where he attended King Edward VII School. He was an all-rounder at cricket: a middle-order batsman and leg-spin bowler. He made his first-class debut for Transvaal B in 1967–68, and alternated between the Transvaal and Transvaal B teams throughout his career.

Greve had his best season in 1972–73, when Transvaal won the A Section of the Currie Cup and Transvaal B won the B Section. He scored 612 runs at an average of 47.07 and took 26 wickets at an average of 27.61. During the season he also made his highest score of 185 not out in Transvaal B's innings victory over Northern Transvaal. In recognition of his outstanding season, he was chosen as one of the South African Cricket Annual Cricketers of the Year in 1973.
