= Fred Graver (footballer) =

English footballer

Personal information
- Full name: Frederick Graver
- Date of birth: 8 September 1897
- Place of birth: Craghead, County Durham, England
- Date of death: 1950 (aged 52–53)
- Height: 5 ft 9 in (1.75 m)
- Positions: Inside right; centre forward

Senior career*
Years	Team	Apps	(Gls)
–	Burnhope Institute		
1920–1921	Darlington		(14)
1921–1922	Shildon Athletic		
1922–1923	Grimsby Town	6	(1)
1923–1924	West Stanley		(41)
1924–1925	Leeds United	3	(0)
1925–1926	Southend United	10	(1)
1926–19??	Wallsend		
- * Club domestic league appearances and goals

Frederick Graver (8 September 1897 – 1950) was an English footballer who played as an inside right or centre forward. He appeared in the Football League for Grimsby Town, although he played more for their reserve team in the Midland League, Leeds United and Southend United. Graver also played for Burnhope Institute and for North-Eastern League clubs Darlington, for whom he scored 14 league goals and 2 in the FA Cup, Shildon Athletic, West Stanley, for whom he scored 41 league goals, and Wallsend.

His son Andy remains, as of March 2021, Lincoln City's all-time top scorer.
