= Greeson =

Greeson is a surname. Notable people with the surname include:

- Greg M. Greeson, American automotive designer and entrepreneur
- Todd Greeson (born 1971), American politician

== See also ==
- Lake Greeson
