= Sheila Greaves =

British Army nurse (1911-2005)

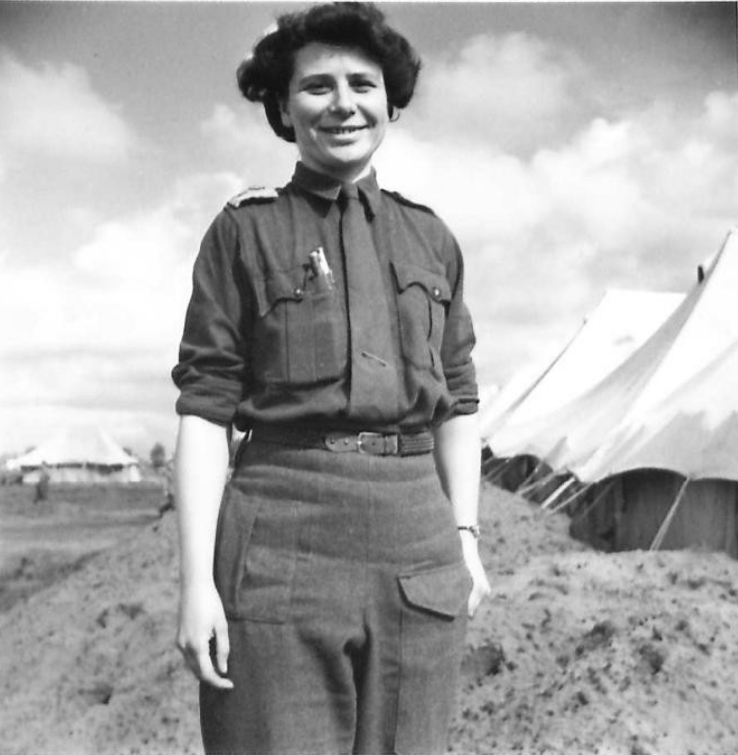
- Greaves photographed at Anzio, March 1944
- Born: Sheila Margaret Greaves; 1 January 1911; Leicester, Leicestershire, England
- Died: 30 March 2005 (aged 94); Tayport, Fife, Scotland
- Education: Guy's Hospital
- Spouse: Humphrey Fox (m. 1948; died 1995)
- Military career
- Allegiance: United Kingdom
- Branch: Queen Alexandra's Imperial Military Nursing Service
- Service years: 1938–1948
- Rank: Sister
- Service number: 206174
- Conflicts: Second World War
- Awards: George Medal

Sheila Margaret Fox, GM (née Greaves; 1 January 1911 – 30 March 2005) was a British army nurse and recipient of the George Medal during the Second World War.

== Early life ==
Sheila Greaves was born in Leicester, England, on New Year's Day 1911, the second daughter of the Reverend Arthur Greaves and Blanche Greaves (née Meadows). Between 1932 and 1936 she was a probationary nurse at Guy's Hospital, London, qualifying as a state registered nurse in June 1936.

== Military career ==
Greaves enlisted in the Queen Alexandra's Imperial Military Nursing Service (QAIMNS) and was made a provisional staff nurse in January 1938. Promotion to sister came in 1943.

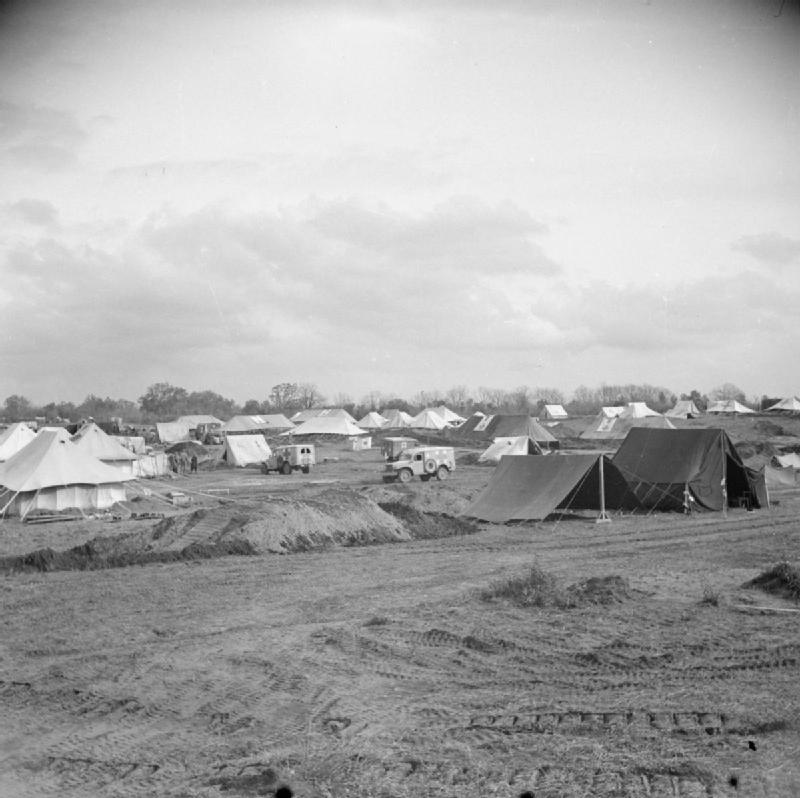
The tented complex of medical units at Anzio including No. 15 Casualty Clearing Station, of which Greaves was a member

Having served in France in 1939–1940, Greaves served in Syria and the Middle East between 1941 and 1943 before the Sicilian and Italian campaigns in 1943. In 1944 Greaves was a nursing sister at No. 15 Casualty Clearing Station (CCS) in the Anzio bridgehead in Italy. The two casualty clearing stations (Nos. 2 and 15) and other medical facilities were within range of enemy artillery and air attacks. On 14 March the reception camp 200 yards (183 m) away from the CCS came under air attack. Greaves immediately ran to the reception camp to treat the wounded while the air attacks continued. Her actions were noticed by senior officers and a recommendation for the award of the George Medal was made. The recommendation noted that:

Her prompt action undoubtedly saved very considerable suffering and hastened the evacuation of the wounded to the Casualty Clearing Station. Sister Greaves was an inspiration to all and undoubtedly risked her life to bring immediate relief to the wounded rather than wait until they were brought to the Casualty Clearing Station.

The recommendation was approved and news of the award of the George Medal was published in the London Gazette on 23 March 1945.

After the war, Greaves continued to serve in the QAIRNS until she resigned in 1948, shortly after her marriage to Major Humphrey Fox of the Royal Artillery.
