= Graver (surname) =

Graver is a surname. Notable people with the surname include:

- Andy Graver (1927–2014), English footballer
- Elizabeth Graver (born 1964), American writer
- Fred Graver, American writer
- Fred Graver (footballer)
- Gary Graver (1938–2006), American film director
- Kjersti Graver (1945–2009), Norwegian jurist

== See also ==
- Kesner-Graver
