= John Grieve (footballer) =

Australian rules footballer

Personal information
- Full name: John William Grieve
- Born: 6 October 1879; Carlton, Victoria
- Died: 11 May 1942 (aged 62); Deniliquin, New South Wales

Playing career^{1}
Years	Club	Games (Goals)
1897	St Kilda	1 (0)
- ^{1} Playing statistics correct to the end of 1897.

John William Grieve (6 October 1879 – 11 May 1942) was an Australian rules footballer who played with St Kilda in the Victorian Football League (VFL).
