= Ernie Greeves =

Australian rules footballer

Personal information
- Full name: Ernest William Greeves
- Born: 22 April 1873; Woodend, Victoria
- Died: 24 June 1946 (aged 73); Elsternwick, Victoria
- Original team: Albert Park

Playing career^{1}
Years	Club	Games (Goals)
1899	St Kilda	2 (1)
- ^{1} Playing statistics correct to the end of 1899.

Ernest William Greeves (22 April 1873 – 24 June 1946) was an Australian rules footballer who played with St Kilda in the Victorian Football League (VFL). He was born in Woodend, Victoria.
