= Lucia C. G. Grieve =

American poet

- Born: Lucia Catherine Graeme Grieve; April 30, 1862; Dublin, Ireland
- Died: November 26, 1946 (aged 84); Asbury Park, New Jersey, U.S.
- Occupation(s): Poet, scholar, educator

Lucia Catherine Graeme Grieve (April 30, 1862 – November 26, 1946) was an Irish-born American poet, educator, and scholar who wrote and lectured about India.

== Early life and education ==
Grieve was born in Dublin and raised in New York City, the daughter of David Graeme Grieve and Martha Lucy Kinkead Grieve. Her sister Louise H. Grieve was a physician and medical missionary in India. She graduated from Wellesley College in 1883, and completed doctoral studies at Columbia University in 1898, with a dissertation on death and burial in Greek tragedies. Her doctoral work included studies at Oxford from 1896 to 1897.

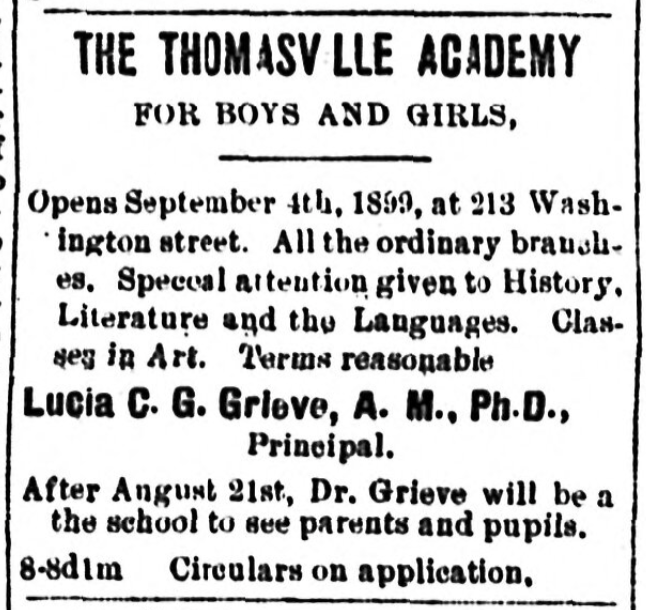
Advertisement for Grieve's Thomasville Academy (1899)

== Career ==
Grieve taught at several private girls' schools after college. She opened and ran a co-educational school in Thomasville, Georgia in 1899, focused on languages, literature, and art. She wrote poetry and fiction, and gave public lectures about India, sometimes in costume.

In the 1930s, Grieve was president of the Ocean Grove Round Table, a women's club in New Jersey. In 1945, she gave a lecture to the group about "numerous experiences in taking her pet cat on 50,000 miles of travel." She was a member of the American Oriental Society, the London Poetry Society, the Kipling Society of London, and the Women's Foreign Missionary Society.

== Publications ==
- Death And Burial In Attic Tragedy: Death And The Dead (1898)
- "Some Folk-Stories of Rāmdās the Last of the Sages" (1904)
- "The Dasara Festival at Satara, India" (1909)
- "The Muharram in Western India" (1910)
- "The Collecting of Coins in India" (1927)

== Personal life ==
Grieve died in 1946, at the age of 84, at a hospital in Asbury Park, New Jersey.
