= Frederick Groves =

Frederick Groves may refer to:

- Frederick Groves (footballer, born 1891), English footballer who played for Glossop, Arsenal, Brighton and Charlton Athletic
- Frederick Groves (footballer, born 1892) (1892–1980), English footballer who played for Huddersfield Town, Sheffield United and Pontypridd
- Fred Groves (actor) (1880–1955), British actor
- Fred Groves (politician) (1924–1995), Canadian politician

== See also ==
- Frederick Philip Grove, German-Canadian author
- Fred Grove (1913–2008), Native-American author
