= John Groves =

John Groves may refer to:

- John Groves (British Army officer) (died 1859), Crown equerry
- John Groves (cricketer) (1914–1996), cricket player and administrator
- John Groves (footballer) (1933–2017), English footballer
- John D. Groves (1922–2007), British journalist and civil servant
- John Percy Groves (1850–1916), British author, librarian, and soldier
- John T. Groves, American chemist
- John W. Groves (1844–1921), mayor of Madison, Wisconsin

== See also ==
- John L. Grove (1921–2003), American inventor and industrialist
