= Robert Grieve (artist) =

Australian painter

Robert Henderson Grieve (30 November 1924 – 15 December 2006) was an Australian painter, printmaker and art teacher.

== History ==
Grieve was born in Brighton, Melbourne, son of Robert Cuthbert Grieve (1889–1957) and Rose Grieve (nee Henderson). His father, who fought with the 1st AIF in Belgium, was a recipient of the Victoria Cross.

Grieve began painting seriously around 1947. He studied at Regent Street Polytechnic, London 1953–1955, taking lithography under Henry Trivick, then taught at Swinburne Technical College 1956–1958. He left for Japan, where he married a Japanese woman and held an exhibition in Tokyo. Much of his subsequent work used Oriental themes and surface effects.

He won several art prizes, including the Vizard-Wholohan Print Prize in 1960 and 1972. He was president of the Victorian branch of the Contemporary Art Society from 1967 to 1987.
