= SS Devanha =

Ocean liner (1905–1928)

History

United Kingdom
- Name: SS Devanha 1905–1914, 1919–1928; Troopship No 5 1914–1915; HMHS Devanha 1915–1919
- Owner: P&O 1905-1928
- Operator: P&O 1905–1914, 1919–1928; Admiralty 1914–1919
- Port of registry: Greenock, Scotland (United Kingdom)
- Route: UK, India, China
- Builder: Caird & Co, Greenock, Scotland
- Yard number: 308
- Launched: 16 December 1905
- Maiden voyage: 1 March 1906
- Out of service: 22 May 1925
- Fate: Sold for scrap, 21 March 1928 Scrapped in Japan, 2 June 1928

General characteristics
- Tonnage: 8,092 (GRT)
- Length: 470 ft (140 m)
- Beam: 56 ft 3 in (17.15 m)
- Draught: 27 ft 8 in (8.43 m)
- Installed power: Two four cylinder quadruple expansion steam engines
- Propulsion: Twin screws
- Speed: 15.5 kn (28.7 km/h; 17.8 mph)

SS Devanha was a passenger liner and cargo vessel operated by the Peninsular and Oriental Steam Navigation Company.

== History ==
SS Devanha was launched in 1905 and entered service for the Peninsular and Oriental Steam Navigation Company in 1906. The ship was built at a cost of £159,249. She made her maiden voyage from the Royal Albert Dock in London on 1 March 1905.

In 1914 she was requisitioned for service as a troop ship during World War I. In 1915, she took part in the Dardanelles campaign, landing the 12th Battalion of Australian troops at what was later Anzac Beach, then steaming up the coast as a feint to draw enemy fire. She was later converted into a hospital ship. In 1916 she rescued survivors from the SS Chantala, which had been torpedoed in the Mediterranean. She continued to serve as a hospital ship in the Persian Gulf, East Africa, Bombay and Suez, before being converted back into a troopship in 1919.

In 1919, Devanha repatriated Australian troops, and in 1920, one of her lifeboats, which has been used during the Gallipoli Campaign, was presented to the Australian National War Memorial in Canberra. The following years saw Devanha re-enter service with P&O. She made her final voyage on 22 May 1925, and was ultimately sold for scrap, valued at £20,500.

She was broken up by Sakaguchi Sadakichi Shoten K K, at Osaka, Japan on 2 June 1928.
