= John Grieve (VC) =

Scottish recipient of the Victoria Cross

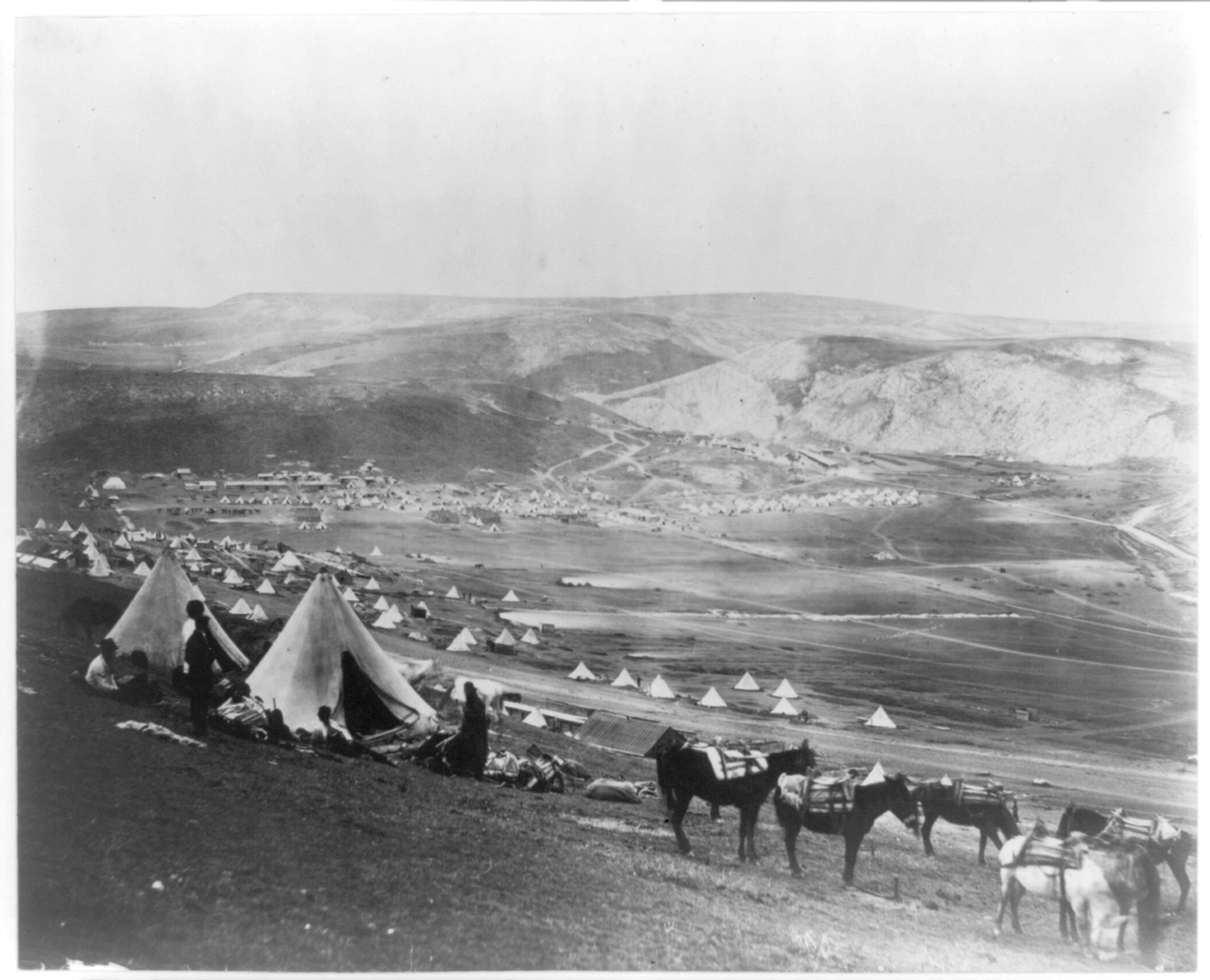
- A cavalry camp near Balaclava in 1855
- Born: 3 May 1821; Musselburgh, East Lothian
- Died: 1 December 1873 (aged 52); Inveresk, East Lothian
- Burial place: St Michael's Churchyard (Inveresk Old), Inveresk
- Military career
- Allegiance: United Kingdom
- Branch: British Army
- Rank: Lieutenant
- Unit: 2nd Dragoons (Royal Scots Greys)
- Conflicts: Crimean War
- Awards: Victoria Cross; Médaille militaire (France)

John Grieve VC (3 May 1821 – 1 December 1873) was a Scottish recipient of the Victoria Cross, the highest and most prestigious award for gallantry in the face of the enemy that can be awarded to British and Commonwealth forces.

Grieve was 34 years old, and a sergeant-major in the 2nd Dragoons (Royal Scots Greys), British Army at the Battle of Balaclava during the Crimean War when the following deed took place on 25 October 1854 at Balaklava, Crimea, for which he was awarded the VC. His citation in the London Gazette read:

Saved the life of an Officer, in the Heavy Cavalry Charge at Balaklava, who was surrounded by Russian Cavalry, by his gallant conduct in riding up to his rescue and cutting off the head of one Russian, disabling and dispersing the others.

The British Army awards in the first list of Victoria Crosses in the London Gazette of 24 February 1857 and in the first VC investiture held at Hyde Park, London, on 26 June 1857, followed the Royal Navy and Royal Marine awards. Unlike the Royal Navy and Royal Marine awards which were in rank order, the British Army awards were in regimental order with the senior regiment being the 2nd Dragoons. As the only 2nd Dragoons recipient, John Grieve was the first Army recipient gazetted and presented with the Victoria Cross.

Grieve later achieved the rank of lieutenant and buried in Inveresk cemetery.

His VC is on display at the Art Gallery of South Australia in Adelaide, Australia. It had been in the possession of his nephews A. I and J. H. Oliver of Cowandilla, South Australia.

He died in East Lothian on 1 December 1873 and was buried in Inveresk parish churchyard. The grave lies in the centre of the section of the original churchyard west of the church.

== Possible relation to other VC winner ==
A number of references including the 1997 edition of The Register of the Victoria Cross list Sergeant Major John Grieve VC (Crimea, 1854) and Captain Robert Cuthbert Grieve (Belgium, 1917) as great uncle and great nephew. This connection was suggested by an article in The Times on 29 May 1964. The article said John Grieve sent home £75 from the Crimea to Robert Grieve and that if Robert Grieve was his brother and also emigrated, then some relationship may be established between the Crimean VC and an Australian First World War VC, Robert Grieve. However, descendants of both Grieve families have been in contact with each other and have found that they are not great uncle and great nephew.

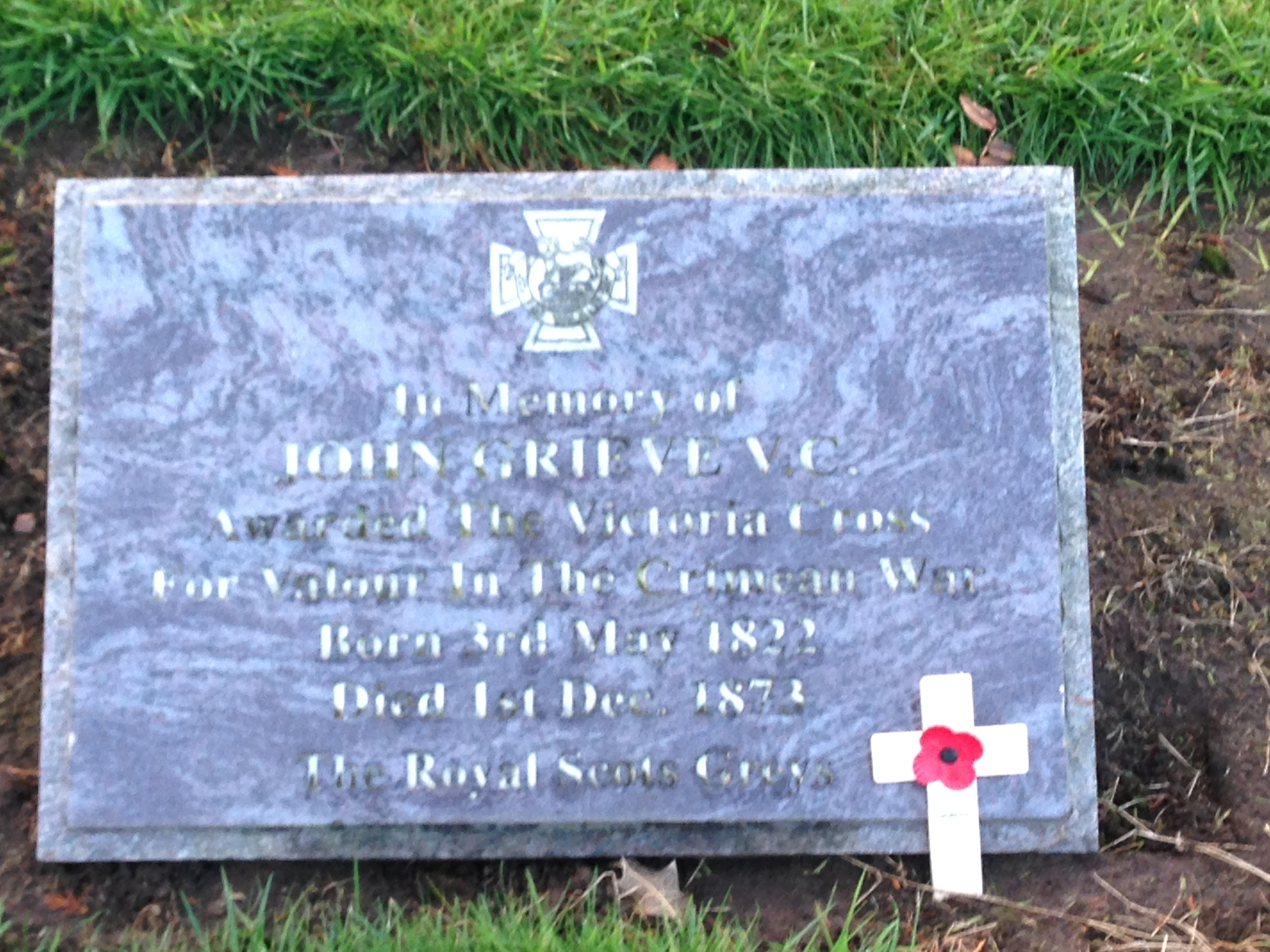
Gravestone of John Grieve VC in Inveresk Cemetery
