= John Grieve (physician) =

Scottish physician

John Grieve FRS FRSE FSA

Personal details
- Born: 1753 Peeblesshire, Scotland
- Died: 21 December 1805 (aged 51–52) Saint Petersburg, Russia
- Occupation: Physician

John Grieve (1753 – 21 December 1805) was a Scottish physician who rose to be physician to the Russian royal family. He did much to foster international relationships between Russia and Scotland.

== Life ==
He was born in Peeblesshire, south of Edinburgh, in 1753 the son of Dr James Grieve (1700–1763), who had been physician to Empress Elizabeth of Russia. He studied medicine at Glasgow University graduating MA MD in 1777.

In 1778 he began service to the Imperial Russian Army, firstly based with the Voronezh Division. Returning to Britain in 1783 due to ill-health, he came to some fame through his attempt to introduce the Russian drink of koumiss (fermented mare's milk) to the country.

In 1784 he was elected a Fellow of the Royal Society of Edinburgh. His proposers were John Walker, Henry Cullen and James Hutton. He was elected a Fellow of the Royal Society of London in 1794. In 1786 he relocated from Edinburgh to London.

In 1798 he returned to Russia as personal physician to Tsar Paul I and following the tsar's death in 1801, physician to Tsar Alexander I and his wife, Empress Elizabeth. In this role he would undoubtedly have come into contact with Matthew Guthrie, a fellow Scot of very similar background, who was the personal Councillor of the tsar and empress.

He died of a stroke in Saint Petersburg in Russia on 21 December 1805.

== Family ==
He had a wife, Rebecca (Sophia), in Saint Petersburg in Russia. They had nine children. One son, Alexander, born in February 1804, only lived a few days.

His sister Jean Grieve married Dr James Mounsey, who also saw service to the Russian royal family.
