= Robert Grieve (VC) =

Australian recipient of the Victoria Cross

Robert Cuthbert Grieve VC
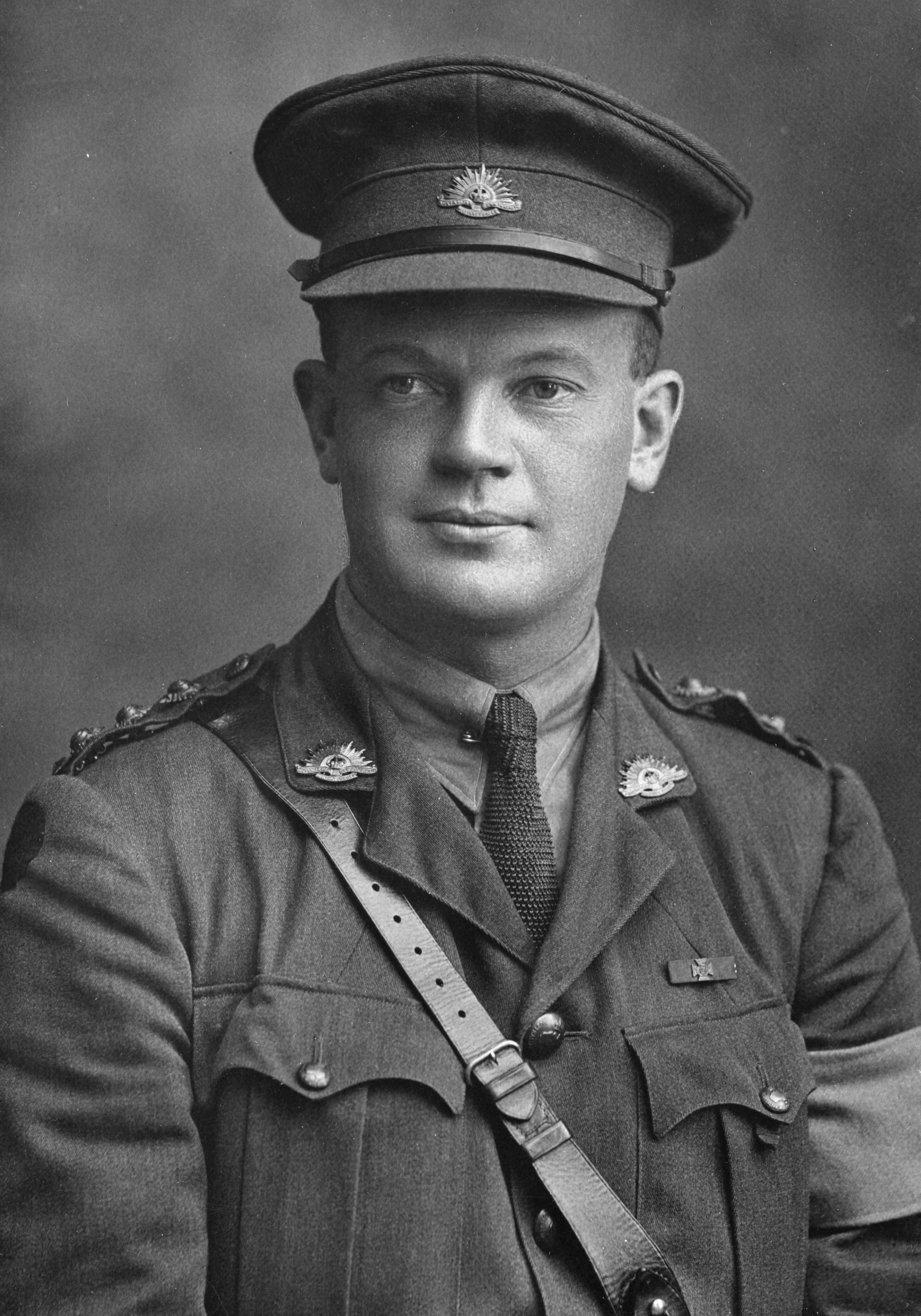
- Captain Robert Grieve c.1917
- Born: 19 June 1889; Brighton, Victoria
- Died: 4 October 1957 (aged 68); Melbourne, Victoria
- Military career
- Allegiance: Australia
- Branch: Australian Imperial Force
- Service years: 1915–1918
- Rank: Captain
- Units: 37th Battalion
- Conflicts: First World War; Battle of Messines
- Awards: Victoria Cross

Robert Cuthbert Grieve, VC (19 June 1889 – 4 October 1957) was an Australian recipient of the Victoria Cross, the highest award for gallantry "in the face of the enemy" that can be awarded to British and Commonwealth forces.

== Early life ==
Born in Brighton, a suburb of Melbourne, to John and Annie Deas Grieve (née Brown), Grieve was educated at Caulfield Grammar School and then Wesley College. He became an interstate commercial traveller in the softgoods trade.

== First World War ==
After nine months service in the Victorian Rangers, he enlisted in the Australian Imperial Force as a private on 9 June 1915. He was commissioned as a second lieutenant in the 37th Battalion in January 1916, was promoted to lieutenant in May 1916, and after training in England, was promoted to captain in France in February 1917.

In France he served at Armentières, Bois-Grenier, L'Epinette, Ploegsteert Wood, Messines, La Basse Ville, and Warneton.

He was awarded the Victoria Cross for his actions at Messines. The announcement and accompanying citation for the award was published in a supplement to the London Gazette of 31 July 1917, reading:

On 7 June 1917 at Messines, Belgium, during an attack on the enemy's position, and after his own company had suffered very heavy casualties, Captain Grieve located two hostile machine-guns which were holding up his advance. Under continuous heavy fire from the two guns, he succeeded in bombing and killing the two gun crews, then reorganized the remnants of his own company and gained his original objective. Captain Grieve set a splendid example and when he finally fell, wounded, the position had been secured.

Severely wounded in the shoulder by a sniper's bullet, Grieve was evacuated to England, and on recovery returned to his unit in October. However, due to subsequently suffering acute trench nephritis and double pneumonia, he was invalided to Australia in May 1918. On 7 August, at Scots Church, Sydney, he married Sister May Isabel Bowman of the Australian Army Nursing Service who had nursed him during his illness.

== Post-war ==
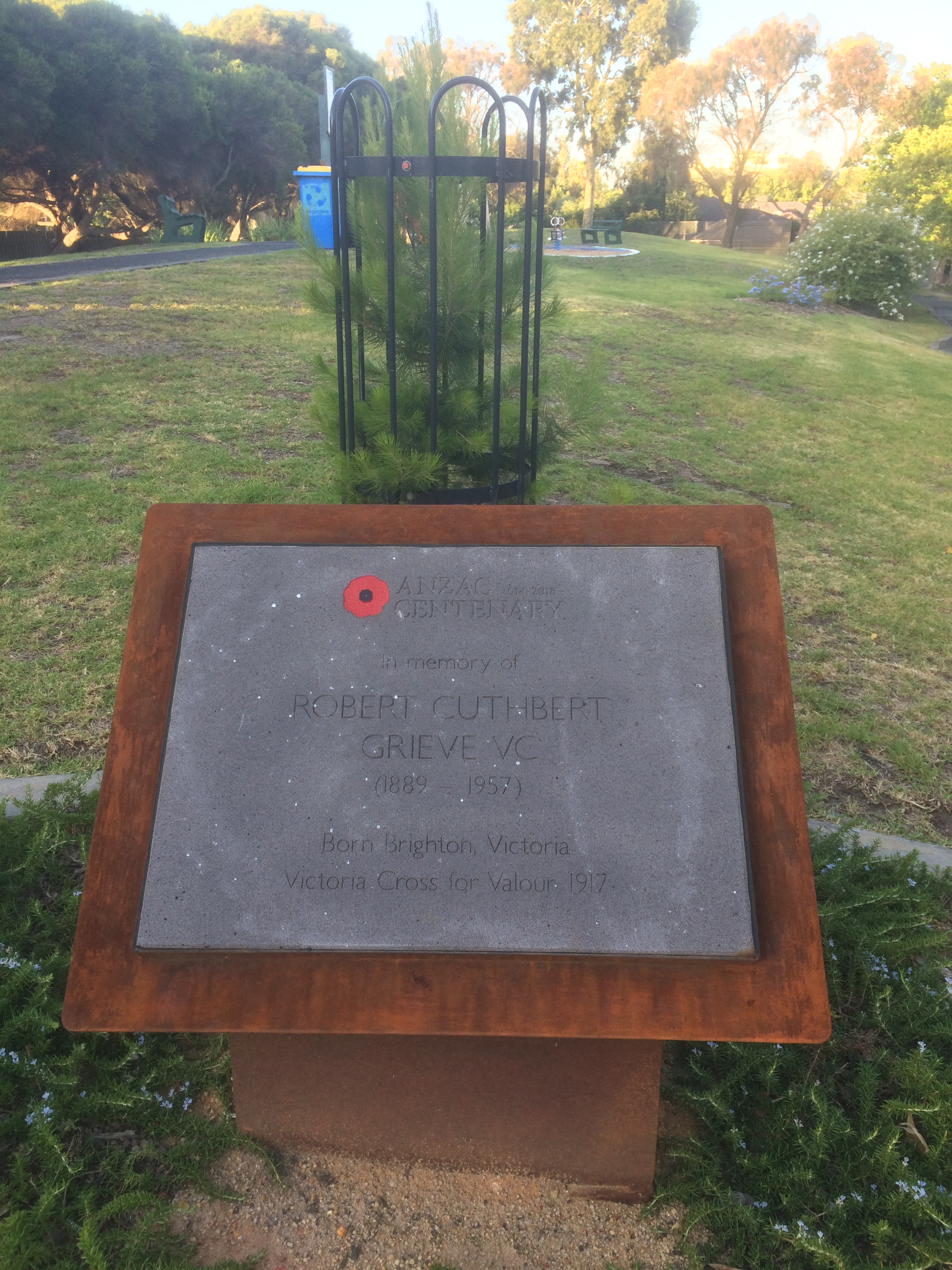
Plaque commemorating Robert Grieve in Brighton, Victoria.

Post-war he held the rank of captain in the Militia. He established the business of Grieve, Gardner & Co., soft-goods warehousemen, in Flinders Lane, Melbourne, and was managing director until 4 October 1957 when he died of cardiac failure.

He was buried with military honours in Springvale cemetery. Grieve's medal was presented by his family to Wesley College in 1959, and has been lent to the Shrine of Remembrance, where it is on permanent display. Grieve was an active supporter of Wesley College for many years and contributed towards an annual scholarship.

A home room at Wesley College is named in his honour as well as a 'Grieve Way' a street in Wodonga, Victoria.

== Family ==
A son, Robert Henderson "Bob" Grieve (30 November 1924 – 15 December 2006) was a noted artist and president of the Victorian branch of the Contemporary Art Society from 1967 to 1987.

=== Relation to John Grieve ===
A number of references including the 1997 edition of The Register of the Victoria Cross list Sergeant Major John Grieve VC (Crimea, 1854) and Captain Robert Cuthbert Grieve (Belgium, 1917) as great uncle and great nephew. This connection was suggested by an article in The Times on 29 May 1964. The article said John Grieve sent home £75 from the Crimea to Robert Grieve and that if Robert Grieve was his brother and also emigrated, then some relationship may be established between the two VC recipients. However, descendants of both Grieve families have been in contact with each other and concluded no such relationship existed.

== See also ==
- List of Caulfield Grammar School people
