= Bill Grieve =

American baseball umpire (1900–1979)

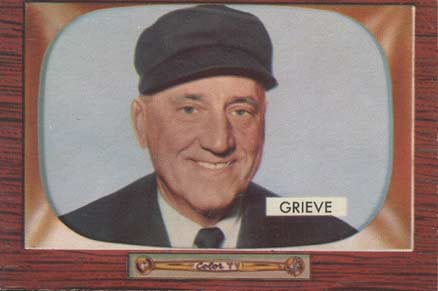
- Born: William Thomas Turner Grieve; April 25, 1900; Yonkers, New York, U.S.
- Died: August 15, 1979 (aged 79); Yonkers, New York, U.S.
- Occupation: Umpire
- Years active: 1938–1955
- Employer: American League

William Thomas Turner Grieve (April 25, 1900 – August 15, 1979) was an American professional baseball umpire who worked in the American League from 1938 to 1955. Grieve umpired 2,783 major league games in his 18-year career. He umpired in three World Series (1941, 1948 and 1953 and two All-Star Games (1941 and 1949).

== Career ==
Grieve was promoted from the American Association to the American League in 1938.

== See also ==
- List of Major League Baseball umpires (disambiguation)
