= Thomas Greaves (musician) =

English composer and lutenist

Thomas Greaves (fl. 1604) was an English composer and lutenist.

He was lutenist to Sir Henry Pierrepont. He published in London in 1604 Songes of sundrie kinds. It contained four madrigals; three of them, 'Come away, sweet love,' 'Lady, the melting crystal of thine eyes,' and 'Sweet nymphs,' were republished in the nineteenth century (1843 and 1857), with pianoforte accompaniment by G. W. Budd.
