= Grieve =

Overview
- Manufacturer: Juan Alberto Grieve
- Production: 1908
- Assembly: Lima, Peru
- Designer: Juan Alberto Grieve

Body and chassis
- Class: Economy Car
- Body style: 2-door touring 5 seats

Dimensions
- Wheelbase: 99.0 in (2,515 mm)

The Grieve was a Peruvian automobile that was built in 1908 by Juan Alberto Grieve, a Peruvian engineer with extensive knowledge in combustion engines. The vehicle became the first automobile designed and built in South America. A pioneer in the automobile industry, Grieve decided to build a car that would be powerful enough to overcome the bad roads and difficult terrain of Peru. The car was developed at Grieve's workshop in Lima, and the only imported elements of the vehicle were the tires from Michelin, the Bosch starter and the carburetor. The car had five seats, two in front and three at the back. Those at the back were removable, leaving an area for haulage.

The vehicle had four cylinders, and the motor had a power of 20HP with 1800 revolutions per minute. Thanks to the elasticity of the engine, this was able to be reduced to 200 revolutions. The cost of the car was 300 pounds, half of what a European car of equal power cost. The car was called "Grieve" after its owner, and the plans were patented. The idea was to commercialize the enterprise and build a fleet of 20 more cars. Grieve decided to speak with President Augusto B. Leguía to, under the sponsorship of the Government, construct three vehicles for the post office, and three more for the city council. The answer from the president was: "We need the products of advanced countries and not experiments with Peruvian products.“

== Background ==
Lima in the early 1900s was a rapidly developing city that was overcoming the destructions made by Chile during the War of the Pacific and the series of different government and social problems that followed the end of the war. The automobile was making a slow introduction into the lives of the city-dwellers by the beginning of the new century. The first automobiles in Peru came from Europe, mainly France and Italy, but there was also a minor role of cars from the United States. However, only the wealthy were able to buy the cars.

== Juan Alberto Grieve ==
The Grieve family came to Peru through George Grieve, an engineer from Scotland that was hired to help construct the Tacna-Arica Railroad. His son, Crisóstomo Grieve Downing, was also an engineer and was hired to design and build the Ferrocarril Central Andino. This was the family of Juan Alberto Grieve, who also became an engineer following in the footsteps of his ancestors.

Juan Alberto Grieve proved to be a person who focused more on the mechanics and electrical engineering of the early 20th century. In 1905, Grieve was already making history by creating the first internal combustion engine of South America. In 1906, Grieve founded the "Automobile Club" of Lima and began to experiment with automobiles and, in 1907, decided to make a vehicle that would fit perfectly with Peruvian roads throughout the country (not just the capital).

== Construction ==
Grieve focused on making the car have a stronger motor that could produce more power. This led him to plan and construct a highly complex motor. The only imported materials he used were the Michelin tires of France and the Bosch starter of Germany. The rest of the equipment was Peruvian, and once completed the automobile was both efficient and cheaper than the important European and North American cars. The automobile was named after its creator, and soon the Grieve received attention from the media thanks to one of Grieve's friends who was the owner of a magazine publisher company.

The Grieve car was presented as affordable and useful for travel throughout Peru. The vehicle had five seats, two in front and three in the back, for a family. However, the three seats in the back could be removed so as to serve as a means of carrying materials. The automobile was revolutionary not only because it was the first South American automobile, but also because it was affordable for all of Peru's economic classes. Grieve planned on creating more vehicles, but needed more funding.

== Leguia's rejection ==
The only economically feasible funding available at that time was the government, and so Grieve decided to directly consult Peru's President Augusto B. Leguia for funding to his vehicles. Grieve even proposed to build Leguia a presidential car and also a couple of extra automobiles for usage of the government. The automobile industry in Peru was apparently going to have a fast bloom.

Yet, as quickly as the hopes started, they were shattered even faster by the simple rejection of President Leguia, who claimed that a Peruvian car was a useless idea in comparison to the automobiles of more developed countries. The automobile industry in Peru never again had a chance at developing.
