= John Edward Greaves =

British industrialist

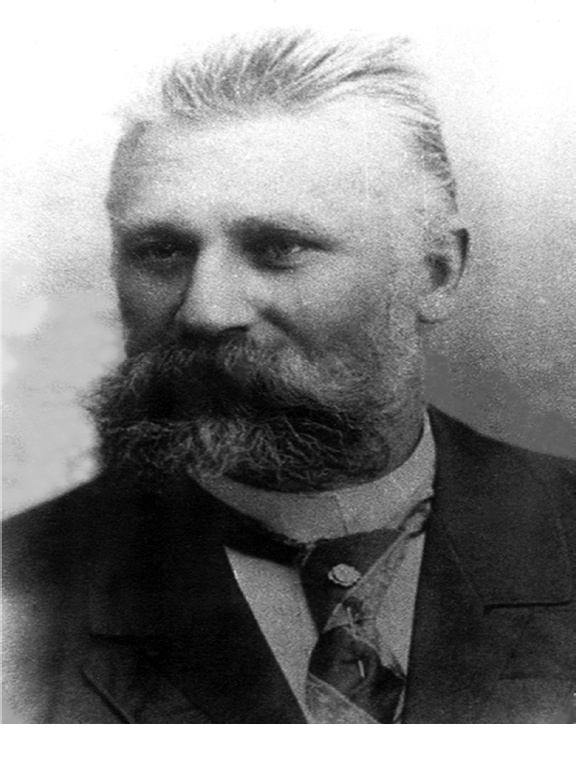

Pro-Consul at Berdyansk
- In office 15 July 1880 – 10 December 1907
- Monarchs: Queen Victoria; Edward VII

Vice-Consul at Berdyansk
- In office 10 December 1907 – 1921
- Monarchs: Edward VII; George V

Personal details
- Born: 1846 Sheffield
- Died: 18 January 1923 (aged 76–77) Sheffield
- Occupation: industrialist, civil engineer
- Awards: Order of the Crown

John Edward Greaves (Russian: Джон Эдуардович Гривз (Гревз); pre-Revolutionary spelling: Джонъ Грiевз; 1846, Sheffield, England, — 18 January 1923, Sheffield) was the British vice-consul at Berdiansk (now, Ukraine) (1907–1921), industrialist, and the founder of one of the largest European companies manufacturing agricultural machines, 'John E. Greaves and Co' (Russian: "Джонъ Грiевз и К°").

== Biography ==
John E. Greaves was born in 1846, in Sheffield, England, to Edward Greaves (1823–1903) and Mary-Ann Turton (b. 1822). He had two brothers: George Turton Greaves, with whom his father owned a cabinet case making firm named 'Edward Greaves and Son', and Joseph Jackson Greaves who was a partner at 'Nicholson, Greaves, Barber, and Hastings, auctioneers'.

In 1866 young J. E. Greaves set out for Berdiansk representing the Clayton and Shuttleworth company. In 1876, he founded a warehouse importing agricultural tools and machines to Berdiansk.

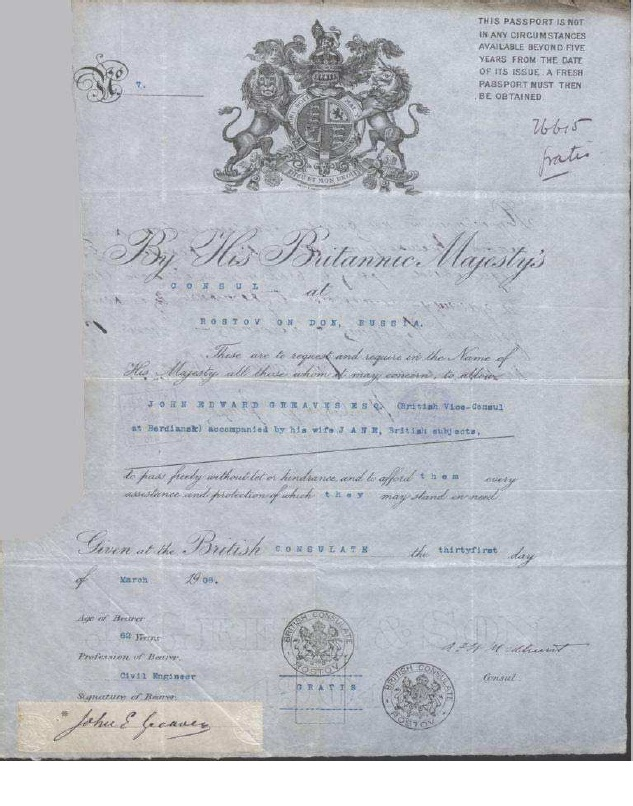
Passport issued to British Vice-consul John E. Greaves, esq. on 31 March 1908 in Rostov-on-Don.

On 15 July 1880 he was appointed the British Pro-Consul at Berdianks, and on 10 December 1907, — the Vice-Consul. His duty was to report to the British consul on trading and economic affair in the Azov region.

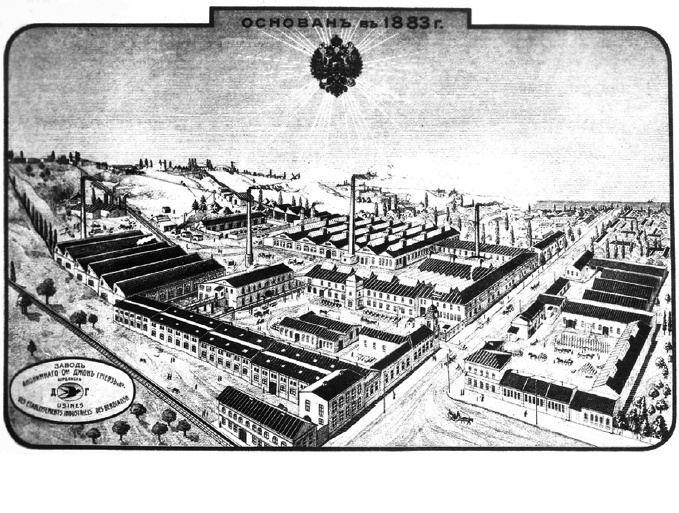
Berdiansk plant of John E. Greaves and Co, circa 1900.

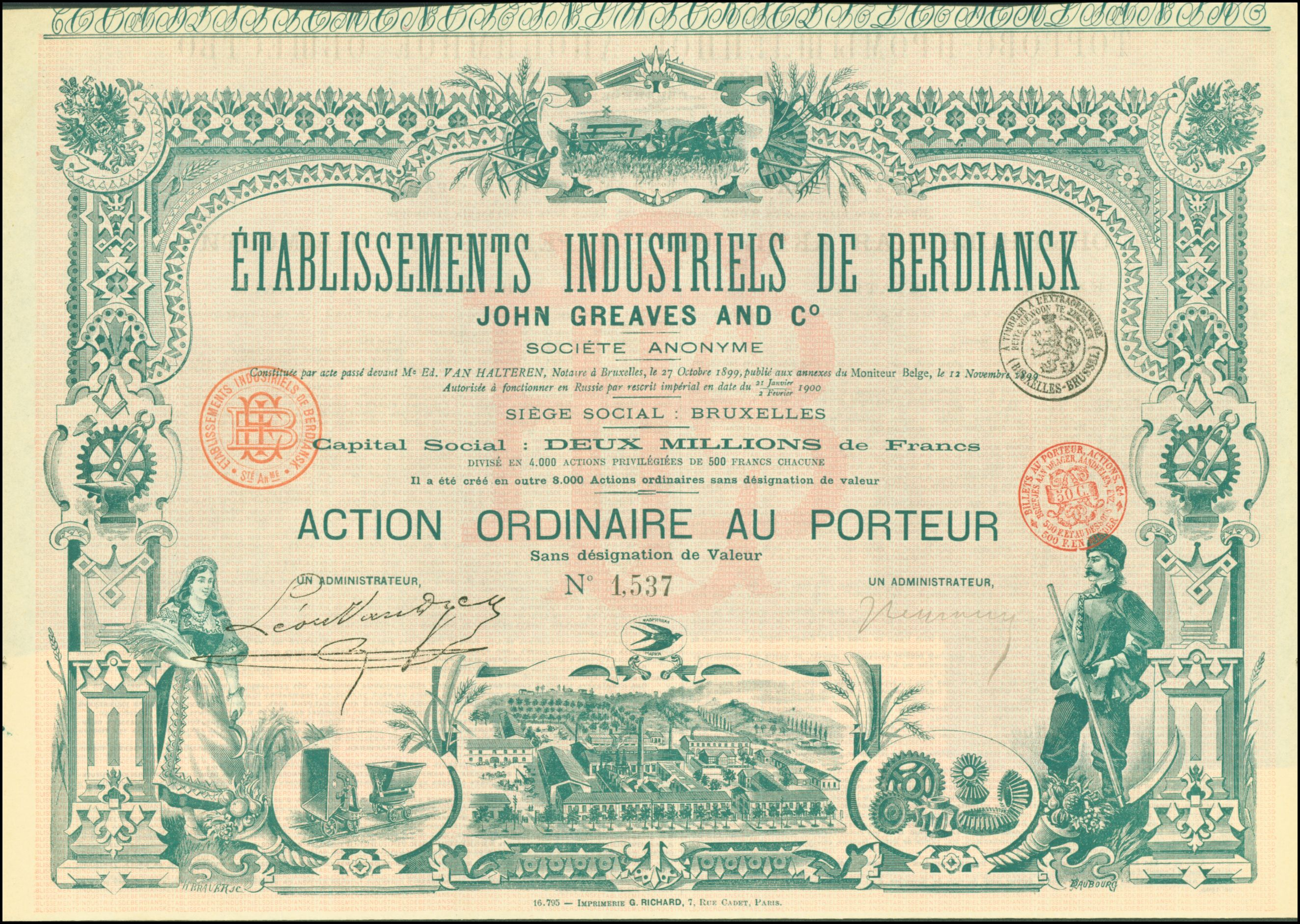
Share of the Etabl. Industriels de Berdiansk John Greaves and Co., issued on 1 February 1900

In 1883 he organised a small plant on Vorontsovskaya st. in Berdiansk. In 1894 his plant was incorporated by Trade Industrial Association. In 1896 at the All-Russian exhibition in Nizhny Novgorod J. Greave's plant was awarded the right to use the Russian Imperial Arms in its advertisements. Two years later, Greaves was granted with personal gratitude from Nicolas II for "very energetic and fruitful activity in the field of Russian agricultural machines manifacturing'. In 1899 he registered the company in Belgium as 'Belgian Anonymous Society John E. Greaves and Co' (Fr.: Etablissements industriels de Berdiansk John Greaves and Co, Société anonyme; Russian: Торгово-Промышленное Анонимное Общество "Джонъ Грiевз и Ко. Бердянск") to avoid Russian taxes. On 21 January 1900 it was officially established in Russia. In 1912, Greaves became a Chavalier of the Belgian Order of the Crown.

Work conditions at the plant were quite tough: 12-hour working day, wage of only one Ruble per shift for adult workers (20-40 Kopeks for adolescent workers). In 1886 Pyotr Schmidt, future leader of Sevastopol revolt of 1905, worked for a short time at the plant. In 1905 the largest strike in Berdiansk occurred and the management of 'John E. Greaves and Co' had to introduce the 9-hour working day and increase wages by 10%.

In 1911 the plant occupied about 500 hectares in Berdiansk, had 1500 workers, 330 processing machines, own electric power plant. The plant had seven machine shops, and annually produced: 7,000 German-type ploughs, 8,000 drill-ploughs, 6,500 sowers, 500 mowers, 4,000 manual and 2,000 automatic reapers, as well as about 1,8 mln pounds of cast iron for other plants.

In 1914 the plant had capital of 3 mln Belgian francs. The company was engaged in both import and export of agricultural machines, with divisions in Kharkiv, Chelyabinsk and Semipalatinsk.

John Greaves was on vacation in Switzerland with his spouse and niece when WWI broke out. They managed to escape to Germany, his wife's native country. There, in Dresden, he was arrested on 1 February 1915, as a British subject. On 4 March 1915 he was released through the efforts of the British government, and on 20 March the family managed to get back to Switzerland, from where they returned to Russia. During the WWI the plant manufactured for the needs of the Russian army. Many of its workers had to go to war, and the plant started to decline.

After the Revolution of 1917, J. E. Greaves went to Petrograd and sold his plant to the Artillery Department. According to one source, he moved to England in May 1918, while the other says he moved to Rostov-on-Don instead and stayed in Russia from 1919 until 1920 during the Civil war hoping for the White to win. In 1920 he escaped to England when Ronstov-on-Don was finally captured by the Red. After it was nationalised by the Bolsheviks, the plant was renamed to Pervomaysky agricultural machines manufacturing plant.

== Family ==
Spouse 1: Jane-Wilhemenia Greaves (Russian: Анна Людвиговна Гривз; January 1845, Munich - 21 December 1916, Berdiansk)

Spouse 2: Nadejda (d. February 1923, Sheffield).

Issue:

- George (b. 1874). Wife: Vera Lazarevna Zdandutto, daughter of a Greek merchant. Sons: John (b. 1895); Nicholas (Nikolay) Greaves (1897, Berdianks - October 28, 1918, Tournai, Belgium), British second-lieutenant of the Royal Flying Corps, a boxer; George (b. 1906).
- Patricia (Cleopatra, b. 1881).
- Emilie (October 8, 1878, Sheffield- 1974, Ontario, Canada). Husband: Peter Issakovich Sudermann (1874-December 24, 1920, Kerch) a Russian-German mennonite, deputy of Berdiansk City Council, manager of commerce at John E. Greaves and Co. He was executed by the Bolsheviks. She escaped to Canada in 1925. Her husband's brother, Jakov Issakovich Sudermann was married to her first-cousin, daughter of George Turton Greaves, Amy-Evelyn Greaves.

== Literature ==
- Lyman I., Konstantinova V., Danchenko Eu.. British Consul and Industrialist John Edward Greaves / Британський консул і промисловець Джон Грієвз. — Бердянськ: Видавець Ткачук О. В., 2017./Berdiansk, 2017.[English, Ukrainian].
