= Grieves (surname) =

Grieves is a surname. Notable people with the surname include:

- Jack Grieves (born 2004), English footballer
- James Grieves (born 1974), Scottish speedway rider
- Ken Grieves (1925–1992), Australian–English football goalkeeper and cricketer

== See also ==
- Grieves (born 1984), American hip hop artist
- Greaves (surname)
- Greeves (surname)
- Grieve (surname)
