= Walter Pollak =

American civil liberties lawyer (1887–1940)

Walter Pollak (1887–1940) was a 20th-century American civil liberties lawyer, who established important precedents while working with other leading radical lawyers in the 1920s and 1930s. His best known cases involved the defense before the Supreme Court of Communist Benjamin Gitlow and the Scottsboro Boys.

== Background ==
Walter Heilprin Pollak was born on June 4, 1887, in Summit, New Jersey to Gustav Pollak (born circa 1849 in Vienna, Austria; died 1919) and Celia Heilprin in a family of "bookish, nonreligious Jews" who had emigrated to the United States in the 1850s. His father was an editor and writer for The Nation magazine. He had two older siblings: a brother, Francis D. Pollak (born in 1876), who also became a lawyer, and a sister, Meta Pollak (born in 1879). Walter Pollak attended DeWitt Clinton High School and then Columbia University in New York City. In 1907, he graduated from Harvard University and in 1910 from Harvard Law School.

== Career ==
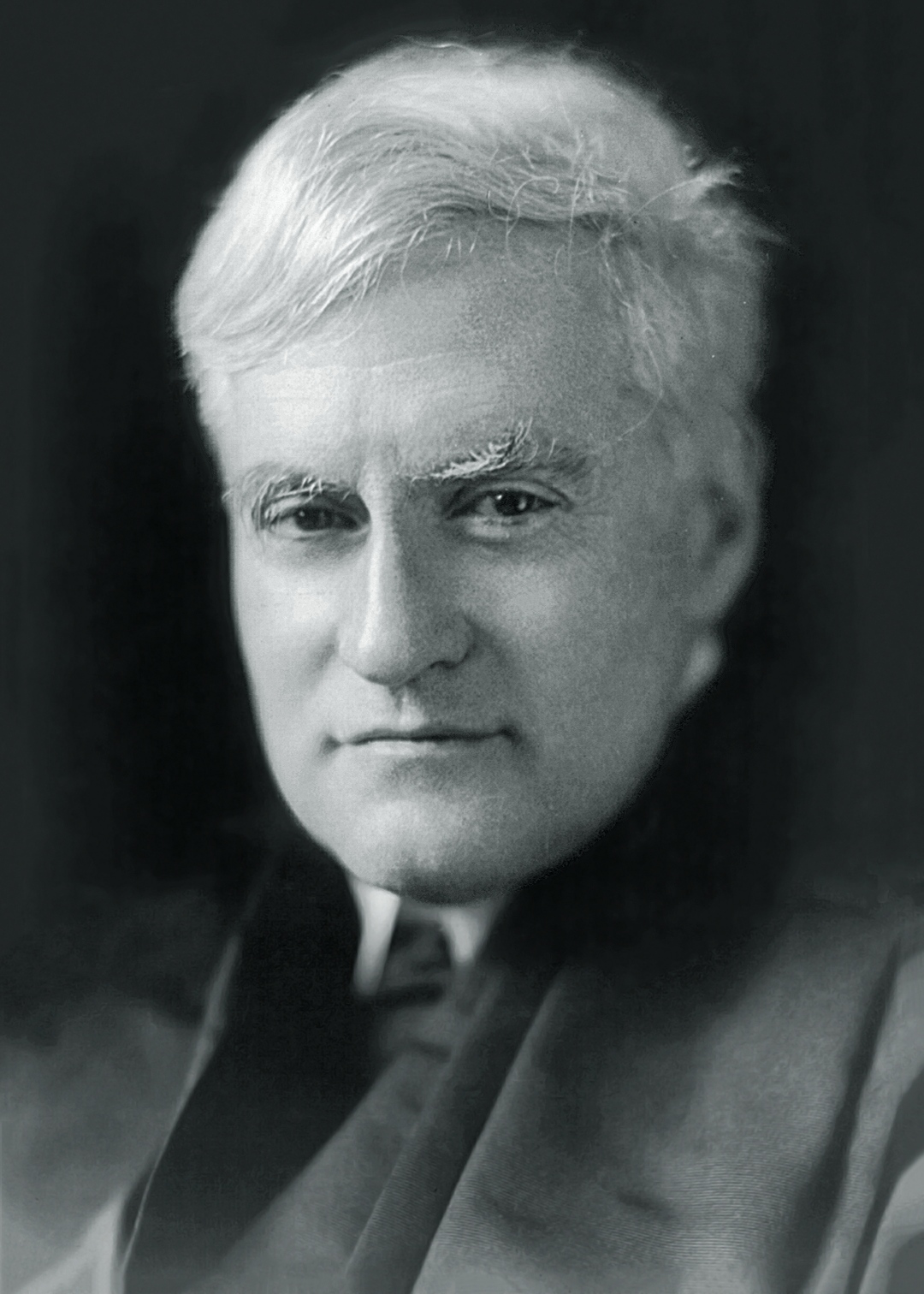
Pollak become lifelong friends with Benjamin N. Cardozo after working at Simpson, Warren and Cardozo in the 1910s

Pollak first joined the law firm of Sullivan and Cromwell but within two years had moved to Simpson, Warren and Cardozo, where he established a lifelong friendship with Benjamin N. Cardozo. (Cardozo left the firm in 1913 to become a New York Supreme Court Justice, was elevated to the state Court of Appeals in 1914, and in 1932 was appointed to the Supreme Court of the United States). Pollak stayed on, and the firm eventually became Engelhard, Pollak, Pitcher, Stern and Clarke.

During the 1920s, according to Max Lowenthal, Pollak was part of a "loose partnership" of radical attorneys that included Joseph R. Brodsky, Swinburne Hale, Walter Nelles, Isaac Shorr, Carol Weiss King, and King's brother-in-law Carl Stern.

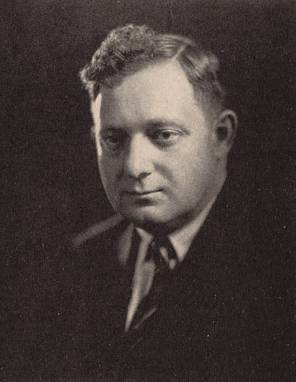
Pollak defended Communist leader Benjamin Gitlow in 1925

In 1925, on behalf of the American Civil Liberties Union (ACLU), Pollak argued his first case before the United States Supreme Court, Gitlow v. New York, defending Communist Party member Benjamin Gitlow against a conviction for "advocacy of criminal anarchy." The court upheld Gitlow's conviction but importantly recognized that the Due Process Clause of the Fourteenth Amendment incorporated and thus protected fundamental provisions of the Bill of Rights, including the freedom of speech. (New York State Governor Al Smith granted Gitlow a full pardon later that year.)

In the early 1930s, on behalf of International Labor Defense, Pollak joined the defense team of the Scottsboro Boys with Joseph R. Brodsky. He took an active part in framing the appeals in Powell v. Alabama (1932), as well as Norris v. Alabama and Patterson v. Alabama (both 1935), the latter of which he argued with the support of the ACLU.

In 1937, during the Great Depression, the firm dissolved. Pollak became of counsel to Cohen, Cole, Weiss, and Wharton (which became Paul, Weiss, Rifkind, Wharton and Garrison).

== Personal and death ==
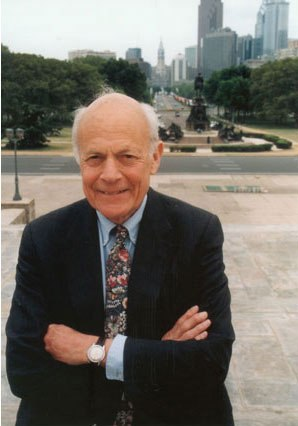
Louis H. Pollak, Pollak's son, was a judge of the U.S. District Court for the Eastern District of Pennsylvania.

Pollak was the father of United States District Court for the Eastern District of Pennsylvania Judge Louis Heilprin Pollak. Before becoming a judge, Louis Pollak served as dean of both Yale Law School and the University of Pennsylvania Law School.

Walter Pollak was a close friend of law professor Zechariah Chafee Jr.

Pollak died on October 2, 1940, age 53, of a heart attack.

== See also ==
- Louis H. Pollak
- Benjamin N. Cardozo
- Joseph R. Brodsky
- Carol Weiss King
- Benjamin Gitlow
- Scottsboro Boys
- American Civil Liberties Union
- International Labor Defense
- Powell v. Alabama (1932)
- Norris v. Alabama (1935)
- Patterson v. Alabama (1935)

== External sources ==
- Pollak, Louis H. (2009). "Pollak, Walter Heilprin (1887–1941)". In Newman, Roger K. (ed.). The Yale Biographical Dictionary of American Law. Yale University Press. p. 430. ISBN 978-0300113006.
- Chafee Jr., Zechariah (12 October 1940). "Walter Heilprin Pollak". The Nation.
- Pollak, Louis H. (1982). "Advocating Civil Liberties: A Young Lawyer Before an Old Court". Harvard Civil Rights–Civil Liberties Law Review. 17: 1.
