= Civil rights movement (1896–1954) =

Social movement in the United States

The civil rights movement (1896–1954) was a long, primarily nonviolent series of actions to bring full civil rights and equality under the law to all Americans. The era has had a lasting impact on American society – in its tactics, the increased social and legal acceptance of civil rights, and in its exposure of the prevalence and cost of racism.

Two US Supreme Court decisions in particular serve as bookends of the movement: the 1896 ruling of Plessy v Ferguson, which upheld "separate but equal" racial segregation as constitutional doctrine; and 1954's Brown v Board of Education, which overturned Plessy. This was an era of new beginnings, in which some movements, such as Marcus Garvey's Universal Negro Improvement Association, were very successful but left little lasting legacy; while others, such as the NAACP's legal assault on state-sponsored segregation, achieved modest results in its early years, as in, Buchanan v. Warley (1917) (zoning), making some progress but also suffering setbacks, as in Corrigan v. Buckley (1926) (housing), gradually building to key victories, including in Smith v. Allwright (1944) (voting), Shelley v. Kraemer (1948) (housing), Sweatt v. Painter (1950) (schooling) and Brown. In addition, the Scottsboro Boys cases led to a pair of 1935 rulings in Powell v. Alabama, and Norris v. Alabama, that served to make anti-racism jurisprudence more prominent in the context of criminal justice.

Following the civil war, the United States expanded the legal rights of African Americans. Congress passed, and enough states ratified, an amendment ending slavery in 1865 — the 13th amendment to the US constitution. This amendment only outlawed slavery; it provided neither citizenship nor equal rights. In 1868, the 14th amendment was ratified by the states, granting African Americans citizenship, whereby all persons born in the US were extended equal protection under the laws of the constitution. The 15th amendment (ratified in 1870) stated that race could not be used as a condition to deprive men of the ability to vote. During Reconstruction (1865–1877), northern troops occupied the South. Together with the Freedmen's Bureau, they tried to administer and enforce the new constitutional amendments. Many Black leaders were elected to local and state offices, and many others organized community groups, especially to support education.

Reconstruction ended following the Compromise of 1877 between northern and southern White elites. In exchange for deciding the contentious presidential election in favor of Rutherford B. Hayes, supported by northern states, over his opponent, Samuel J. Tilden, the compromise called for the withdrawal of northern troops from the South. This followed violence and fraud in southern elections from 1868 to 1876, which had reduced Black voter turnout and enabled southern White Democrats to regain power in state legislatures across the South. The compromise and withdrawal of federal troops meant that such Democrats had more freedom to impose and enforce discriminatory practices. Many African Americans responded to the withdrawal of federal troops by leaving the South in the Kansas Exodus of 1879.

The Radical Republicans, who spearheaded Reconstruction, had attempted to eliminate both governmental and private discrimination by legislation. Such effort was largely ended by the Supreme Court's decision in the civil rights cases, in which the court held that the 14th Amendment did not give Congress power to outlaw racial discrimination by private individuals or businesses.

== Key events ==
Although reconstruction was shut down by the rise of white supremacy around 1877, most blacks were still allowed to vote and a few were elected to office.

- Disfranchisement (1888–1908).

Each Southern state legislature passed voting laws that systematically removed over 95% of the Black voters. The key device was the poll tax, whereby everyone either paid a $2 tax and was allowed to vote in the general election or saved the money and did not vote. The Democratic Party controlled all major offices, and it set up primary elections for white voters only. Many poor whites also stopped voting in the general election and primaries.

- Segregation wins approval of Supreme Court (1896–1915)

This period began with a disastrous setback for equal rights. In 1896, the U.S. Supreme Court in Plessy v. Ferguson established the doctrine of "separate but equal". As a result, the federal courts approved legally sanctioned racial segregation across the country. This ruling provided the legal foundation for Jim Crow laws throughout the South, mandating separate public facilities for Black and white Americans, including schools, restrooms, and transportation. In 1897 the Supreme Court in Williams v. Mississippi upheld the voting restrictions established by a poll tax in Mississippi in 1890.

== Segregation ==
The Supreme Court's decision in Plessy v Ferguson (1896) upheld state-mandated discrimination in public transportation under the "separate but equal" doctrine. As Justice Harlan, the only member of the Court to dissent from the decision, predicted:

If a state can prescribe, as a rule of civil conduct, that whites and blacks shall not travel as passengers in the same railroad coach, why may it not so regulate the use of the streets of its cities and towns as to compel white citizens to keep on one side of a street, and black citizens to keep on the other? Why may it not, upon like grounds, punish whites and blacks who ride together in street cars or in open vehicles on a public road or street?

The Plessy decision did not address an earlier Supreme Court case, Yick Wo v. Hopkins (1886), involving discrimination against Chinese immigrants, that held that a law that is race-neutral on its face, but is administered in a prejudicial manner, is an infringement of the Equal Protection Clause in the Fourteenth Amendment to the US Constitution. While in the 20th century, the Supreme Court began to overturn state statutes that disenfranchised African Americans, as in Guinn v. United States (1915), with Plessy, it upheld segregation that Southern states enforced in nearly every other sphere of public and private life. The Court soon extended Plessy to uphold segregated schools. In Berea College v. Kentucky, the Court upheld a Kentucky statute that barred Berea College, a private institution, from teaching both black and white students in an integrated setting. Many states, particularly in the South, took Plessy and Berea as blanket approval for restrictive laws, generally known as Jim Crow laws, that created second-class status for African Americans.

In many cities and towns, African Americans were not allowed to share a taxi with whites or enter a building through the same entrance. They had to drink from separate water fountains, use separate restrooms, attend separate schools, be buried in separate cemeteries and swear on separate Bibles. They were excluded from restaurants and public libraries. Many parks barred them with signs that read "Negroes and dogs not allowed." One municipal zoo listed separate visiting hours.

The etiquette of racial segregation was harsher, particularly in the South. African Americans were expected to step aside to let a white person pass, and black men dared not look any white woman in the eye. Black men and women were addressed as "Tom" or "Jane," but rarely as "Mr." or "Miss" or "Mrs.," titles then widely in use for adults. Whites referred to black men of any age as "boy" and a black woman as "girl;" both often were called by labels such as "nigger" or "colored."

Less formal social segregation in the North began to yield to change. In 1941, however, the United States Naval Academy, based in segregated Maryland, refused to play a lacrosse game against Harvard University because Harvard's team included a black player.

=== Jackie Robinson's Major League Baseball debut, 1947 ===
Jackie Robinson was a sports pioneer of the civil rights movement, best known for becoming the first African American to play professional sports in the major leagues. Robinson debuted with the Brooklyn Dodgers of Major League Baseball on April 15, 1947. His first major league game came one year before the US Army was integrated, seven years before Brown v. Board of Education, eight years before Rosa Parks, and before Martin Luther King Jr. was leading the movement.

== Political opposition ==
=== Lily-white movement ===
Following the Civil War, black leaders made substantial progress in establishing representation in the Republican Party.

Among the most prominent was Norris Wright Cuney, the Republican Party chairman in the late 19th century Texas. These gains led to substantial discomfort among many white voters, who generally supported the Democrats. During the 1888 Texas Republican Convention, Cuney coined the term lily-white movement to describe efforts by white conservatives to oust black people from positions of party leadership and incite riots to divide the party. Increasingly organized efforts by this movement gradually eliminated black leaders from the party. The writer Michael Fauntroy contends that the effort was coordinated with Democrats as part of a larger movement toward disenfranchisement of black people in the South at the end of the 19th and beginning of the 20th century by increasing restrictions in voter registration rules.

Following biracial victories by a Populist-Republican slates in several states, by the late 19th century the Democratic Party had regained control of most state legislatures in the South. From 1890 to 1908, they accomplished disenfranchisement of blacks and, in some states, many poor whites. Despite repeated legal challenges and some successes by the NAACP, the Democrats continued to devise new ways to limit black electoral participation, such as white primaries, through the 1960s.

Nationally, the Republican Party tried to respond to black interests. Theodore Roosevelt, president 1901–1909, had a mixed record on race relations. He relied extensively on the backstage advice of Booker T. Washington regarding patronage appointments across the South. He publicly invited Washington to dinner at the White House, thereby challenging racist attitudes. On the other hand, he began the system of segregating federal employees; and he cracked down on black soldiers who refused to testify against each other in the Brownsville Affair of 1906. In order to defeat his successor William Howard Taft for the Republican nomination in 1912, Roosevelt pursued a Lily-white policy in the South. This new progressive party of 1912 was supportive of black rights in the North, but excluded all black members in the South.

Republicans in Congress repeatedly proposed federal legislation to prohibit lynching, which was always defeated by the Southern block. In 1920 Republicans made opposition to lynching part of their platform at the Republican National Convention. Lynchings, primarily of black men in the South, had increased in the decades around the turn of the 20th century. Leonidas C. Dyer, a white Republican Representative from St. Louis, Missouri, worked with the NAACP to introduce an anti-lynching bill into the House, where he gained strong passage in 1922. His effort was defeated by the Southern Democratic block in the Senate, which filibustered the bill that year, and in 1923 and 1924.

=== Disenfranchisement ===
Opponents of black civil rights used economic reprisals and frequently violence at the polls in the 1870s and 1880s to discourage blacks from registering to vote or voting. Paramilitary groups such as the Red Shirts in Mississippi and the Carolinas, and the White League in Louisiana, practiced open intimidation on behalf of the Democratic Party. By the turn of the 20th century, white Democratic-dominated Southern legislatures disfranchised nearly all age-eligible African-American voters through a combination of statute and constitutional provisions. While requirements applied to all citizens, in practice, they were targeted at blacks and poor whites (and Mexican Americans in Texas), and subjectively administered. The feature "Turnout in Presidential and Midterm Elections" at the following University of Texas website devoted to politics, shows the drastic drop in voting as these provisions took effect in Southern states compared to the rest of the US, and the longevity of the measures.

Mississippi passed a new constitution in 1890 that included provisions for poll taxes, literacy tests (which depended on the arbitrary decisions of white registrars), and complicated record keeping to establish residency, which severely reduced the number of blacks who could register. It was litigated before the Supreme Court. In 1898, in Williams v. Mississippi, the Court upheld the state. Other Southern states quickly adopted the "Mississippi plan", and from 1890 to 1908, ten states adopted new constitutions with provisions to disfranchise most blacks and many poor whites. States continued to disfranchise these groups for decades, until mid-1960s federal legislation provided for oversight and enforcement of constitutional voting rights.

Blacks were most adversely affected, and in most southern states black voter turnout dropped to tiny numbers. In Alabama, for instance, it is estimated that no more than 1,500 blacks were registered in 1941, and that many fewer than that actually voted. Besides 520,000 blacks, 600,000 poor whites were similarly disfranchised.

It was not until the 20th century that litigation by African Americans on such provisions began to meet some success before the Supreme Court. In 1915 in Guinn v. United States, the Court declared Oklahoma's "grandfather clause" to be unconstitutional. Although the decision affected all states that used the grandfather clause, state legislatures quickly employed new devices to continue disfranchisement. Each provision or statute had to be litigated separately. The NAACP, founded in 1909, litigated against many such provisions.

One device which the Democratic Party began to use widely in Southern states in the early 20th century was the white primary, which served for decades to disfranchise the few blacks who managed to get past barriers of voter registration. Barring blacks from voting in the Democratic Party primaries meant they had no chance to vote in the only competitive contests, as the Republican Party was then powerless in the South outside certain overwhelmingly white Unionist areas. White primaries were not completely struck down by the Supreme Court until Smith v. Allwright in 1944.

== Criminal law and lynching ==
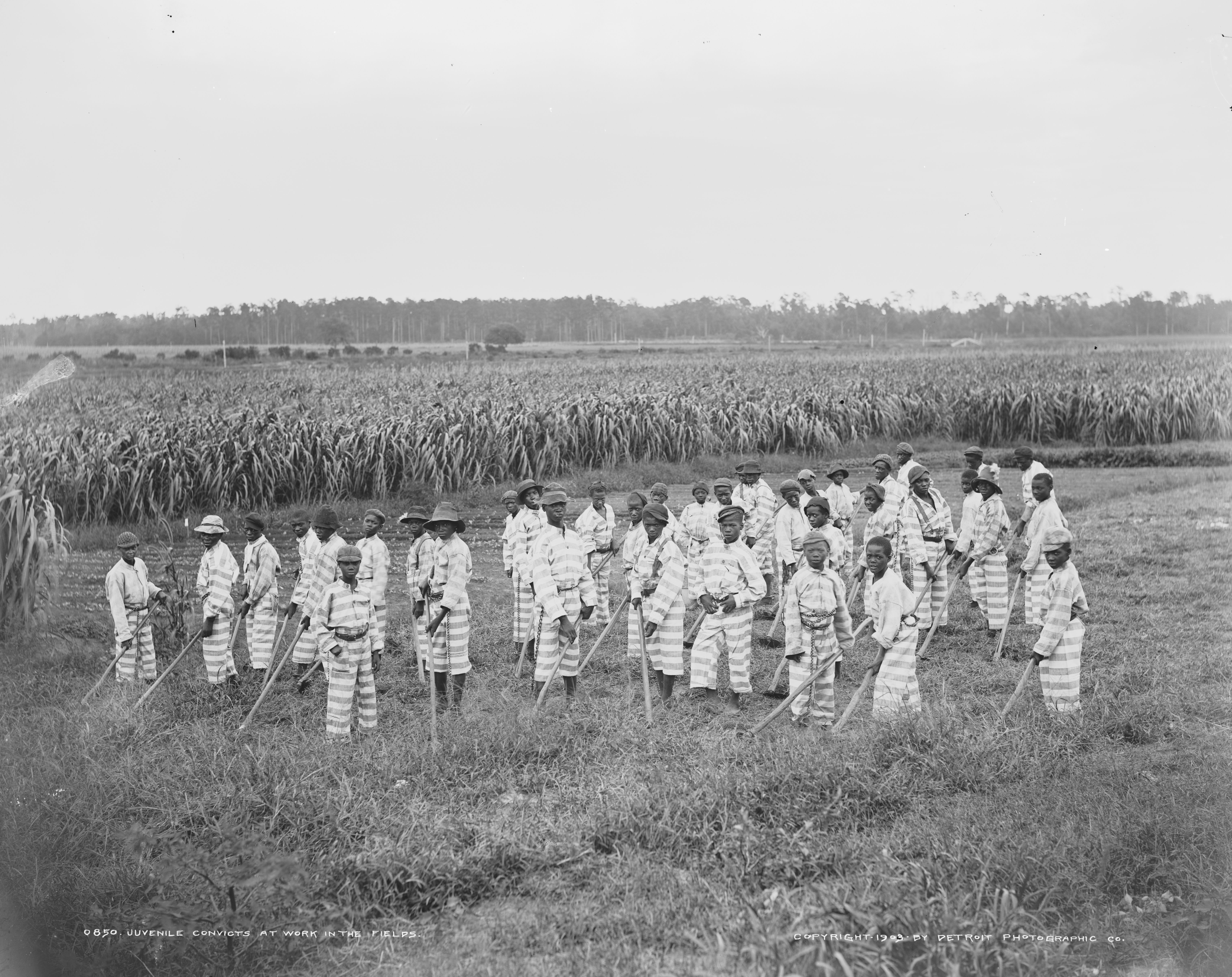
Juvenile African-American convicts working in the fields in a chain gang, photo taken c. 1903

In 1880, the United States Supreme Court ruled in Strauder v. West Virginia, that African Americans could not be excluded from juries. However, beginning in 1890 with new state constitutions and electoral laws, the South effectively disfranchised blacks. This routinely disqualified them for jury duty which was limited to voters, and left them at the mercy of a white justice system arrayed against them. In some states, particularly Alabama, the state used the criminal justice system to reestablish a form of peonage, through the convict-lease system. The state sentenced black males to years of imprisonment, which they spent working without pay. The state leased prisoners to private employers, such as Tennessee Coal, Iron and Railroad Company, a subsidiary of United States Steel Corporation, which paid the state for their labor. Because the state made money, the system created incentives for the jailing of more men, who were disproportionately black. It also created a system in which treatment of prisoners received little oversight.

Extrajudicial punishment was more brutal. During the last decade of the 19th century and the first decades of the 20th century, white vigilante mobs lynched thousands of black males, sometimes with the overt assistance of state officials, mostly within the South. No whites were charged with crimes in any of those murders. Whites were so confident of their immunity from prosecution for lynching that they not only photographed the victims, but made postcards out of the pictures.

The Ku Klux Klan, which had largely disappeared after a brief violent career in the early years of Reconstruction, reappeared in 1915. It grew mostly in industrializing cities of the South and Midwest that underwent the most rapid growth from 1910 to 1930. Social instability contributed to racial tensions that resulted from severe competition for jobs and housing. People joined KKK groups because they were anxious about their place in American society, as cities were rapidly changed by a combination of industrialization, migration of blacks and whites from the rural South, and waves of increased immigration from mostly rural southern and eastern Europe.

Initially the KKK presented itself as another fraternal organization devoted to betterment of its members. The KKK's revival was inspired in part by the movie Birth of a Nation, which glorified the earlier Klan and dramatized the racist stereotypes concerning blacks of that era. The Klan focused on political mobilization, which allowed it to gain power in states such as Indiana, on a platform that combined racism with anti-immigrant, anti-Semitic, anti-Catholic and anti-union rhetoric, but also supported lynching. It reached its peak of membership and influence about 1925, declining rapidly afterward as opponents mobilized.

Republicans repeatedly introduced bills in the House to make lynching a federal crime, but they were defeated by the Southern block. In 1920 the Republicans made an anti-lynching bill part of their platform and achieved passage in the House by a wide margin. Southern Democrats in the Senate repeatedly filibustered the bill to prevent a vote, and defeated it in the 1922, 1923 and 1924 sessions as they held the rest of the legislative program hostage.

== Farmers and blue-collar workers ==
White society also kept blacks in a position of economic subservience or marginality. Most black farmers in the South by the early 20th century worked as sharecroppers or tenant farmers, and relatively few were landowners.

Employers and labor unions generally restricted African Americans to the worst paid and least desirable jobs. Because of the lack of steady, well-paid jobs, relatively undistinguished positions, such as those with the Pullman Porter or as hotel doorman, became prestigious positions in black communities in the North. The expansion of railroads meant that they recruited in the South for laborers, and tens of thousands of blacks moved North to work with the Pennsylvania Railroad, for example, during the period of the Great Migration. In 1900 Reverend Matthew Anderson, speaking at the annual Hampton Negro Conference in Virginia, said that "the lines along most of the avenues of wage earning are more rigidly drawn in the North than in the South. There seems to be an apparent effort throughout the North, especially in the cities to debar the colored worker from all the avenues of higher remunerative labor, which makes it more difficult to improve his economic condition even than in the South."

== The golden age of black entrepreneurship ==
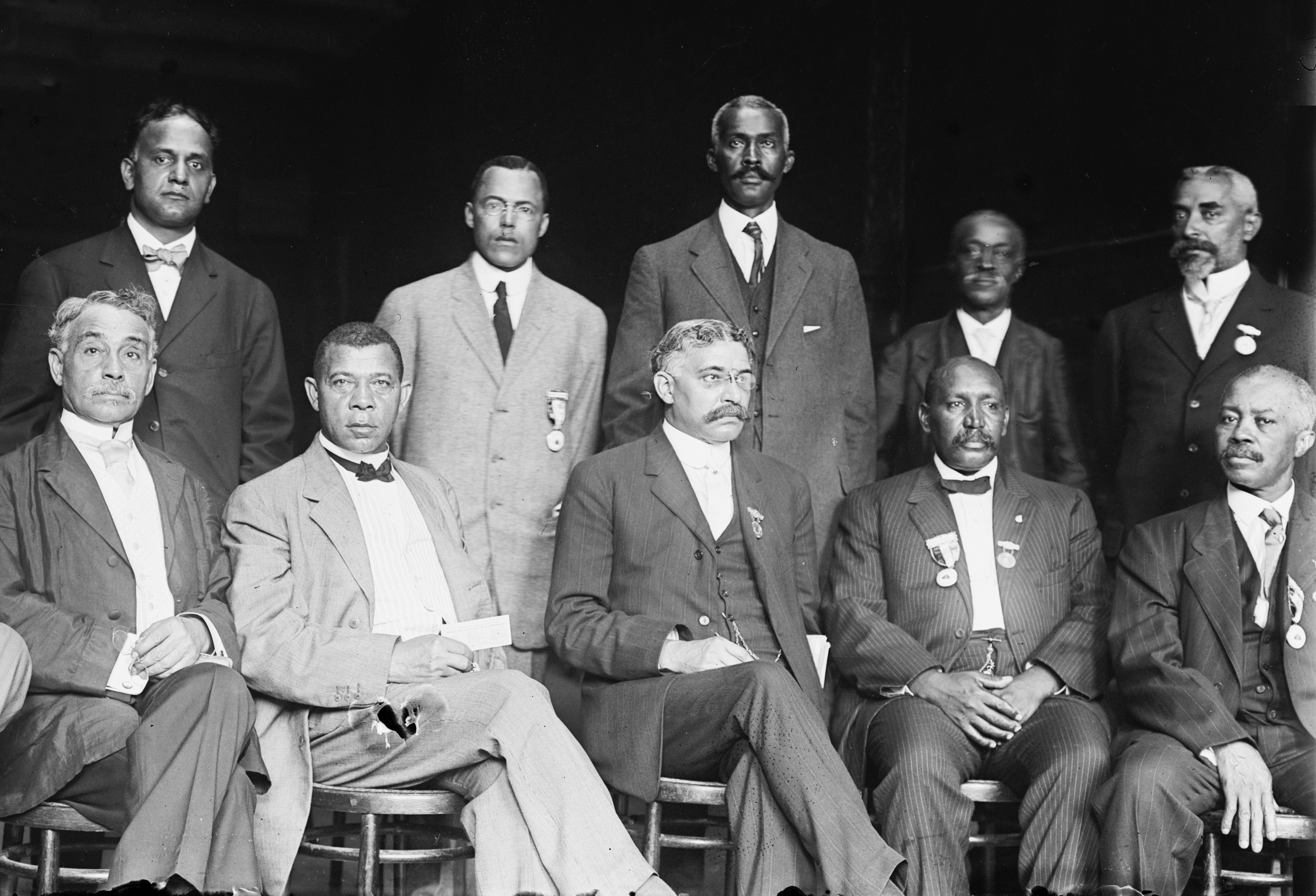
Executive Committee of the National Negro Business League, c. 1910. NNBL founder Booker T. Washington (1856–1915) is seated, second from the left.

The nadir of race relations was reached in the early 20th century, in terms of political and legal rights. Blacks were increasingly segregated. Cut off from the larger white community, however, black entrepreneurs succeeded in establishing flourishing businesses that catered to a black clientele, including professionals. In urban areas, north and south, the size and income of the black population was growing, providing openings for a wide range of businesses, from barbershops to insurance companies. Undertakers had a special niche in their communities, and often played a political role, as they were widely known and knew many of their constituents.

Historian Juliet Walker calls the 1900s to 1930s the "Golden age of black business." According to the National Negro Business League, the number of black-owned businesses doubled rapidly, from 20,000 in 1900 to 40,000 in 1914. There were 450 undertakers in 1900, rising to 1,000 over this time period. The number of black-owned drugstores rose from 250 to 695. Local retail merchants—most of them quite small—jumped from 10,000 to 25,000. One of the most famous entrepreneurs was Madame C.J. Walker (1867–1919), who built a national franchise business called Madame C. J. Walker Manufacturing Company, based on her development of the first successful hair straightening process.

Booker T. Washington, who ran the National Negro Business League and was president of the Tuskegee Institute, was the most prominent promoter of black business. He traveled from city to city to sign up local entrepreneurs into the national league.

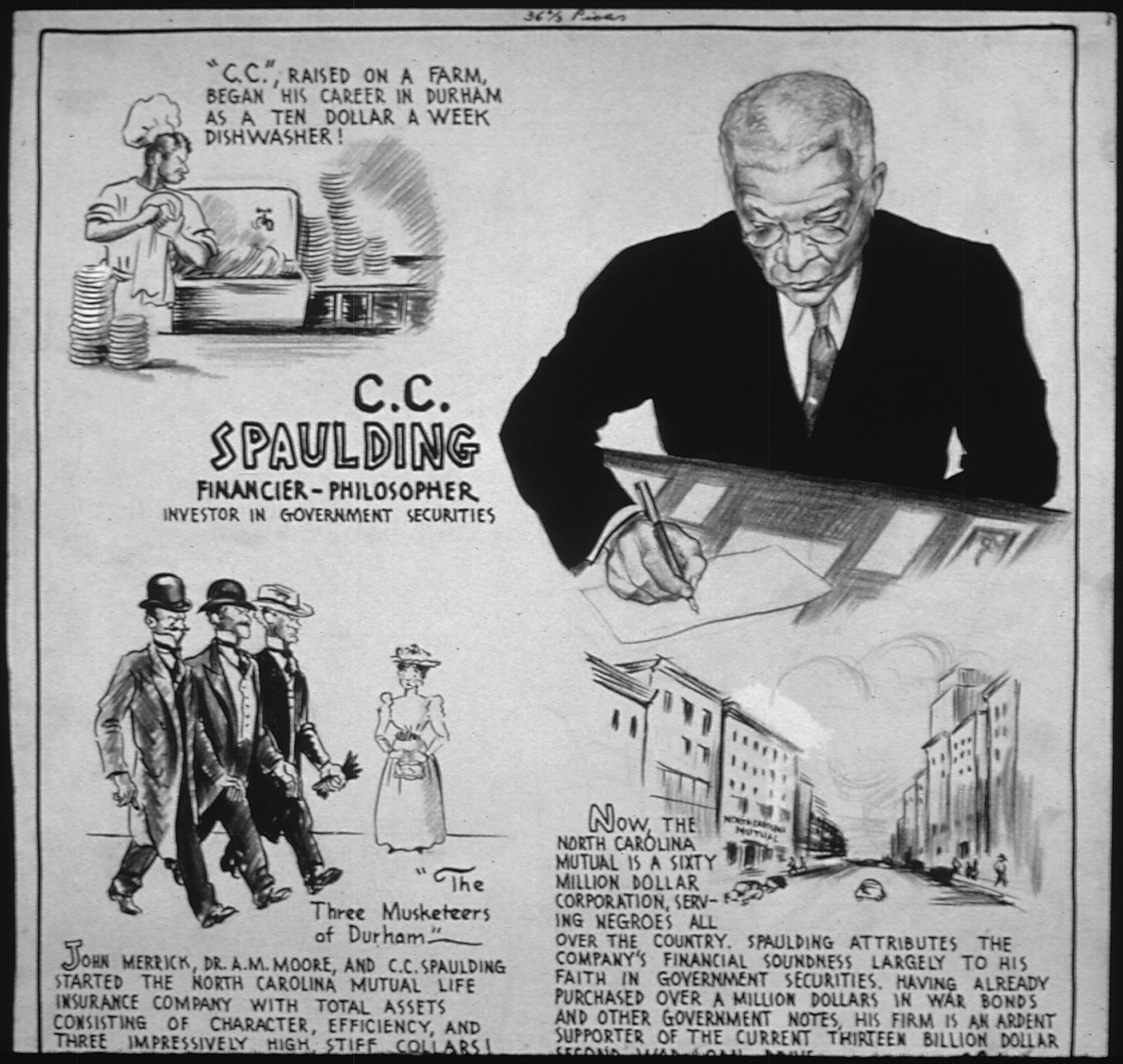
Poster from Office of War Information. Domestic Operations Branch. News Bureau, 1943.

Charles Clinton Spaulding (1874–1952), an ally of Washington, was the most prominent black American business leader of his day. Behind the scenes he was an advisor to President Franklin D. Roosevelt in the 1930s, with the goal of promoting a black political leadership class. He founded North Carolina Mutual Life Insurance Company, which became America's largest black-owned business, with assets of over $40 million at his death.

Although black business flourished in urban areas, it was severely handicapped in the rural South where the great majority of blacks lived. Blacks were farmers who depended on one cash crop, typically cotton or tobacco. They chiefly traded with local white merchants. The primary reason was that the local country stores provided credit, that is the provided supplies the farm and family needed, including tools, seeds, food and clothing, on a credit basis until the bill was paid off at harvest time. Black businessmen had too little access to credit to enter this business. Indeed, there were only a small number of wealthy blacks; overwhelmingly they were real estate speculators in the fast-growing cities, typified by Robert Church in Memphis.

=== Division of Negro Affairs in the Department of Commerce ===
Minority entrepreneurship entered the national agenda in 1927 when Secretary of Commerce Herbert Hoover set up a Division of Negro Affairs to provide advice, and disseminate information to both white and black businessmen on how to reach the black consumer. Entrepreneurship was not on the New Deal agenda of Franklin D. Roosevelt. However, when he turned to war preparation in 1940, he used this agency to help black business secure defense contracts. Black businesses had not been oriented toward manufacturing, and generally were too small to secure any major contracts. President Eisenhower disbanded the agency in 1953.

== Executive orders for non-discriminatory hiring by defense contractors ==
President Roosevelt issued two executive orders directing defense contractors to hire, promote and fire without regard for racial discrimination. In areas such as West Coast shipyards and other industries, blacks began to gain more of the skilled and higher-paying jobs and supervisory positions.

== The black church ==
As the center of community life, Black churches were integral leaders and organizers in the civil rights movement. Their history as a focal point for the Black community and as a link between the Black and White worlds made them natural for this purpose.

This period saw the maturing of independent black churches, whose leaders were usually also strong community leaders. Blacks had left white churches and the Southern Baptist Convention to set up their own churches free of white supervision immediately during and after the American Civil War. With the help of northern associations, they quickly began to set up state conventions and, by 1895, joined several associations into the black National Baptist Convention, the first of that denomination among blacks. In addition, independent black denominations, such as the African Methodist Episcopal (AME) Church and AME Zion Church, had made hundreds of thousands of converts in the South, founding AME churches across the region. The churches were centers of community activity, especially organizing for education.

Rev. Martin Luther King Jr. was but one of many notable Black ministers involved in the later civil rights movement. Ralph David Abernathy, James Bevel, Bernard Lee, Joseph Lowery, Fred Shuttlesworth, and C. T. Vivian are among the many notable minister-activists. They were especially important during the later years of the movement in the 1950s and 1960s.

== Educational growth ==
Continuing to see education as the primary route of advancement and critical for the race, many talented blacks went into teaching, which had high respect as a profession. Segregated schools for blacks were underfunded in the South and ran on shortened schedules in rural areas. Despite segregation, in Washington, DC by contrast, as Federal employees, black and white teachers were paid on the same scale. Outstanding black teachers in the North received advanced degrees and taught in highly regarded schools, which trained the next generation of leaders in cities such as Chicago, Washington, and New York, whose black populations had increased in the 20th century due to the Great Migration.

Education was one of the major achievements of the black community in the 19th century. Blacks in Reconstruction governments had supported the establishment of public education in every Southern state. Despite the difficulties, with the enormous eagerness of freedmen for education, by 1900 the African-American community had trained and put to work 30,000 African-American teachers in the South. In addition, a majority of the black population had achieved literacy. Not all the teachers had a full 4-year college degree in those years, but the shorter terms of normal schools were part of the system of teacher training in both the North and the South to serve the many new communities across the frontier. African-American teachers got many children and adults started on education.

Northern alliances had helped fund normal schools and colleges to teach African-American teachers, as well as create other professional classes. The American Missionary Association, supported largely by the Congregational and Presbyterian churches, had helped fund and staff numerous private schools and colleges in the South, who collaborated with black communities to train generations of teachers and other leaders. Major 20th-century industrialists, such as George Eastman of Rochester, New York, acted as philanthropists and made substantial donations to black educational institutions such as Tuskegee Institute.

In 1862, the U.S. Congress passed the Morrill Act, which established federal funding of a land grant college in each state, but 17 states refused to admit black students to their land grant colleges. In response, Congress enacted the second Morrill Act of 1890, which required states that excluded blacks from their existing land grant colleges to open separate institutions and to equitably divide the funds between the schools. The colleges founded in response to the second Morill Act became today's public historically black colleges and universities (HBCUs) and, together with the private HBCUs and the unsegregated colleges in the North and West, provided higher educational opportunities to African Americans. Federally funded extension agents from the land grant colleges spread knowledge about scientific agriculture and home economics to rural communities with agents from the HBCUs focusing on black farmers and families.

In the 19th century, blacks formed fraternal organizations across the South and the North, including an increasing number of women's clubs. They created and supported institutions that increased education, health and welfare for black communities. After the turn of the 20th century, black men and women also began to found their own college fraternities and sororities to create additional networks for lifelong service and collaboration. For example, Alpha Phi Alpha the first black intercollegiate fraternity was founded at Cornell University in 1906. These were part of the new organizations that strengthened independent community life under segregation.

Tuskegee took the lead in spreading industrial education to Africa, typically in cooperation with church missionary efforts. Julius Rosenwald, the Jewish-American president of Sears Roebuck, joined forces with Booker T. Washington to create schools in the Jim Crow South. Close to 5000 schools were erected in eleven Southern states as well as in Oklahoma, Missouri, Kentucky, and Maryland. It is estimated that from 1950 to 1920 close to thirty percent of African American children in the South were educated in these schools, known as the Rosenwald Schools.

== Libraries ==
Development of library services for blacks, particularly in the South, was slow moving and lackluster. At the turn of the 20th century there were only a few available and they were largely housed on private grounds. Western Colored Branch established in 1908, the first public library in the South for African Americans, was the first of its kind to be funded by a Carnegie grant. Following the formation of the Western Colored Branch, other such facilities were constructed, particularly in association with black schools.

== The NAACP ==
=== The Niagara Movement and the founding of the NAACP ===
At the turn of the 20th century, Booker T. Washington was regarded, particularly by the white community, as the foremost spokesman for African Americans in the US. Washington, who led the Tuskegee Institute, preached a message of self-reliance. He urged blacks to concentrate on improving their economic position rather than demanding social equality until they had proved that they "deserved" it. Publicly, he accepted the continuation of Jim Crow and segregation in the short term, but privately helped to fund national court cases that challenged the laws.

W. E. B. Du Bois and others in the black community rejected Washington's apology for segregation. One of his close associates, William Monroe Trotter, was arrested after challenging Washington when he came to deliver a speech in Boston in 1905. Later that year Du Bois and Trotter convened a meeting of black activists on the Canadian side of Niagara Falls. They issued a manifesto calling for universal manhood suffrage, elimination of all forms of racial segregation and extension of education—not limited to the vocational education that Washington emphasized—on a nondiscriminatory basis. The Niagara Movement was actively opposed by Washington, and had effectively collapsed due to internal divisions by 1908.

Du Bois joined with other black leaders and white activists, such as Mary White Ovington, Oswald Garrison Villard, William English Walling, Henry Moskowitz, Julius Rosenwald, Lillian Wald, Rabbi Emil G. Hirsch, and Stephen Wise to create the National Association for the Advancement of Colored People (NAACP) in 1909. Du Bois also became editor of its magazine The Crisis. In its early years, the NAACP concentrated on using the courts to attack Jim Crow laws and disfranchising constitutional provisions. It successfully challenged the Louisville, Kentucky, ordinance that required residential segregation in Buchanan v. Warley, 245 U.S. 60 (1917). It also gained a Supreme Court ruling striking down Oklahoma's "grandfather clause" that exempted most illiterate white voters from a law that disfranchised African-American citizens in Guinn v. United States (1915).

Segregation in the federal civil service began under President Theodore Roosevelt, and continued under President Taft. President Wilson allowed his cabinet to escalate the process, ignoring complaints by the NAACP. The NAACP lobbied for commissioning of African Americans as officers in World War I. It was arranged for Du Bois to receive an Army commission, but he failed his physical. In 1915 the NAACP organized public education and protests in cities across the nation against D.W. Griffith's film Birth of a Nation, a film that glamorized the Ku Klux Klan. Boston and a few other cities refused to allow the film to open.

=== Anti-lynching activities ===
The NAACP operated primarily at the local level, providing as forum that brought black religious, professional and business elites in most large cities. Baltimore was a pioneer in battling for issues that dominated the agendas of the post-World War II civil rights and Black Power movements. Baltimore activists were protest pioneers during the 1930s and 1940s. They organized in the city to fight against housing discrimination, school segregation, prison conditions, and police brutality.

The NAACP devoted much of its energy between the first and second world wars to mobilizing a crusade against the lynching of blacks. It investigated the serious race riots in numerous major industrial cities throughout the United States in what was called the "Red Summer of 1919," catalyzed by postwar economic and social tensions. Though primarily consisting of white-on-black attacks, Red Summer saw blacks begin to fight back, in Chicago and other cities.

The organization sent Walter F. White, who later became its general secretary, to Phillips County, Arkansas, in October 1919 to investigate the Elaine massacres. In that year, it was unusual for being a rural riot: more than 200 black tenant farmers were killed for trying to organize a union. They were murdered by roving white vigilantes and federal troops after a deputy sheriff's attack on a union meeting of sharecroppers left one white man dead. The NAACP organized the appeals for twelve men sentenced to death a month later, based on their testimony having been obtained by beating and electric shocks. The groundbreaking United States Supreme Court decision in Moore v. Dempsey, significantly expanded the Federal courts' oversight of the states' criminal justice systems in the years to come.

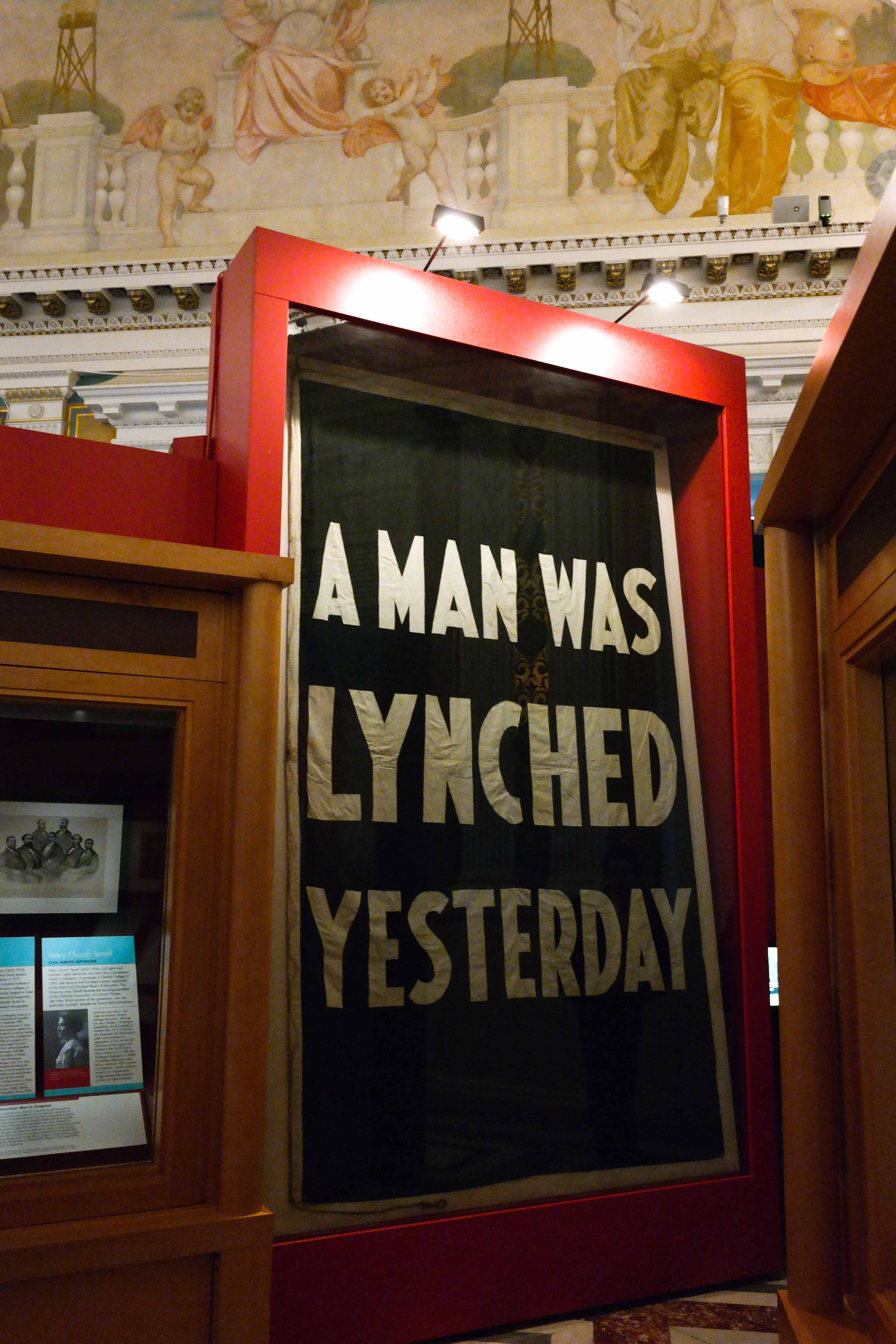
"A Man Was Lynched Yesterday" flag, hanging at the Library of Congress

The NAACP worked for more than a decade seeking federal anti-lynching legislation. Its offices in New York City regularly displayed a black flag out the window—stating "A Man Was Lynched Yesterday"—to mark each outrage. Efforts to pass an anti-lynching law foundered on the power of the Solid South; Southern Democrats in the Senate controlled power in Congress. For instance, while Republicans achieved passage in the House of an anti-lynching law in 1922, Southern Democratic senators filibustered the bill in the Senate and defeated it in the 1922, 1923 and 1924 legislative sessions. Because positions were awarded by seniority and the South was a one-party region, its Democratic congressmen controlled important chairmanships in both houses of Congress. The South defeated all anti-lynching legislative bills.

The NAACP led the successful fight, in alliance with the American Federation of Labor, to prevent the nomination of John Johnston Parker to the Supreme Court. They opposed him because of his opposition to black suffrage and his anti-labor rulings. This alliance and lobbying campaign were important for the NAACP, both in demonstrating their ability to mobilize widespread opposition to racism and as a first step toward building political alliances with the labor movement.

Elbert Williams of Brownsville, Tennessee, is believed to be the first NAACP member lynched for his civil rights activities, killed on June 20, 1940. He had been part of an NAACP effort in 1940 to register black voters in his city for that year's presidential election. Whites targeted other NAACP members, threatening them, and ran several families out of town who feared for their safety. In 2015 the Tennessee Historical Commission approved a marker commemorating Elbert Williams in Brownsville.

=== Desegregation activities ===
After World War II, African-American veterans returning to the South were spurred by their sacrifices and experiences to renew demands for the protection and exercise of their constitutional rights as citizens in American society. One serviceman reportedly said:

I spent four years in the Army to free a bunch of Dutchmen and Frenchmen, and I'm hanged if I'm going to let the Alabama version of the Germans kick me around when I get home. No sirree-bob! I went into the Army a nigger; I'm comin' out a man.

From 1940 to 1946, the NAACP's membership grew from 50,000 to 450,000.

The NAACP's legal department, headed by Charles Hamilton Houston and Thurgood Marshall, undertook a litigation campaign spanning several decades to bring about the reversal of the "separate but equal" doctrine established in the Supreme Court's decision in Plessy v. Ferguson (1896). Instead of appealing to the legislative or executive branches of government, they focused on challenges through the courts. They knew that Congress was dominated by Southern segregationists, while the Presidency could not afford to lose the Southern vote. The NAACP's first cases did not challenge the principle directly, but sought instead to establish factually that the state's segregated facilities in transportation, public education and parks, for instance, were not equal. These were typically underfunded, with outdated textbooks and facilities. Such cases helped lay the foundation for the ultimate reversal of the doctrine in Plessy v. Ferguson.

Marshall believed that the time had come to do away with "separate but equal". The NAACP issued a directive stating that their goal was now "obtaining education on a nonsegregated basis and that no relief other than that will be acceptable." The first case that Marshall argued on this basis was Briggs v. Elliott, but the NAACP also filed challenges to segregated education in other states. In Topeka, Kansas, the local NAACP branch determined that Oliver Brown would be a good candidate for filing a lawsuit; he was an assistant pastor and the father of three girls. The NAACP instructed him to apply to enroll his daughters at a local white school; after the expected rejection, Brown v. Board of Education was filed. Later, this and several other cases made their way to the Supreme Court, where they were consolidated under the title of Brown. The decision to name the case after one originating in Kansas was apparently made "so that the whole question would not smack of being a purely southern one."

Some in the NAACP thought Marshall was moving too quickly. They feared that the Southern judge, Chief Justice Fred M. Vinson, who would almost certainly oppose overruling Plessy, could destroy their case. One historian stated: "There was a sense that if you do this and you lose, you're going to enshrine Plessy for a generation." A government lawyer involved in the case agreed that it was "a mistake to push for the overruling of segregation per se so long as Vinson was chief justice—it was too early."

In December 1952, the Supreme Court heard the case, but could not come to a decision. Unusually, they pushed the case back by a year, to allow the lawyers involved to research the intention of the framers who drafted the "Equal Protection Clause" of the 14th Amendment. In September 1953, Vinson died of a heart attack, for which Justice Felix Frankfurter remarked: "This is the first indication I have ever had that there is a God." Vinson was succeeded as chief justice by Earl Warren, who was known for his moderate views on civil rights.

After the case was reheard in December, Warren set about persuading his colleagues to reach a unanimous decision overruling Plessy. Five of the other eight judges were firmly on his side. He persuaded another two by saying that the decision would not touch greatly on the original question of Plessy's legality, focusing instead on the principle of equality. Justice Stanley Reed was swayed after Warren suggested that a Southerner's lone dissent on this issue could be more dangerous and incendiary than the court's unanimous decision. In May 1954, Warren announced the Court's decision, which he wrote. It said that "segregation of children in public schools solely on the basis of race" was unconstitutional because it deprived "the children of the minority group of equal educational opportunities" and thus equal protection under the law.

Numerous Southern leaders and their constituents strongly resisted the ruling; the Governor of Virginia, Thomas B. Stanley, insisted he would "use every legal means at my command to continue segregated schools in Virginia," and some school districts closed down rather than integrate. One survey suggested that 13% of Florida policemen were willing to enforce the decision in Brown.

Some 19 Senators and 77 members of the House of Representatives, including the entire congressional delegations of the states of Alabama, Arkansas, Georgia, Louisiana, Mississippi, South Carolina and Virginia, signed "The Southern Manifesto", all but two of the signatories were Southern Democrats: Republicans Joel Broyhill and Richard Poff of Virginia also promised to resist the decision by "lawful means." By the fall of 1955, Cheryl Brown started first grade at an integrated school in Topeka—the first step on the long road to eventual equality for African Americans.

== American-Jewish support ==
Many from the American-Jewish community tacitly or actively supported the civil rights movement. Several co-founders of the NAACP, themselves, were Jewish and, in the latter part of the 20th century, many of its white members and leading activists came from within the Jewish community.

Jewish philanthropists actively supported the NAACP and various other civil rights groups, as well as schools for African Americans. The Jewish philanthropist Julius Rosenwald supported the construction of thousands of primary and secondary schools for black youth in the rural South; the public school system was segregated and black facilities were historically underfunded. In partnership with Booker T. Washington and Tuskegee University, Rosenwald created a matching fund which provided seed money for building. Tuskegee Institute architects created model school plans. Black communities essentially taxed themselves twice to raise funds for such schools, which required community matching funds. Often most of the residents in rural areas were blacks. Public funds were committed for the schools, and blacks raised additional funds by community events, donating land and labor, and sometimes by members' getting second mortgages on their homes. Hoping to encourage collaboration, Rosenwald required the white school systems to support the schools by approving them. At one time some forty percent of rural southern blacks were learning at Rosenwald elementary schools; nearly 5,000 were built in total. Rosenwald also contributed to HBCUs such as Howard, Dillard and Fisk universities.

The 2000 PBS television production From Swastika to Jim Crow discussed Jewish involvement in the civil rights movement. It recounted that Jewish scholars fleeing from or surviving the Holocaust of World War II came to teach at many Southern schools, where they reached out to black students:

Thus, in the 1930s and 1940s when Jewish refugee professors arrived at Southern Black Colleges, there was a history of overt empathy between Blacks and Jews, and the possibility of truly effective collaboration. Professor Ernst Borinski organized dinners at which Blacks and Whites would have to sit next to each other—a simple yet revolutionary act. Black students empathized with the cruelty these scholars had endured in Europe and trusted them more than other Whites. In fact, often Black students—as well as members of the Southern White community—saw these refugees as "some kind of colored folk."

After World War II particularly, the American Jewish Committee, American Jewish Congress, and Anti-Defamation League (ADL), among other institutions, became active in promoting civil rights through various outlets.

== "The New Negro" ==
The experience of fighting in World War I along with exposure to different racial attitudes in Europe influenced the black veterans by creating a widespread demand for the freedoms and equality for which they had fought. Those veterans found conditions at home as bad as ever. Some were assaulted even while wearing their uniforms in public. This generation responded with a far more militant spirit than the generation before, urging blacks to fight back when whites attacked them. A. Philip Randolph introduced the term the New Negro in 1917, becoming a catchphrase to describe the new spirit of militancy and impatience of the post-war era.

A group known as the African Blood Brotherhood, a socialist group with a large number of Caribbean émigrés in its leadership, organized around 1920 to demand the same sort of self-determination for black Americans that the Wilson administration was promising to Eastern European peoples at the Versailles conference in the aftermath of World War I. The leaders of the Brotherhood, many of whom joined the Communist Party in the years to come, were also inspired by the anti-imperialist program of the new Soviet Union.

In addition, during the Great Migration, hundreds of thousands of African Americans moved to northern industrial cities starting prior to World War I and through 1940. Another wave of migration during and after World War II led many to West Coast cities, as well as more in the North. They were both fleeing violence and segregation and seeking jobs, as manpower shortages in war industries promised steady work. Continued depressed conditions in the farm economy of the South in the 1920s made the north look more appealing. Those expanding northern communities confronted familiar problems—racism, poverty, police abuse and official hostility—but these were in a new setting, where the men could vote (and women, too, after 1920), and possibilities for political action were far broader than in the South.

=== Marcus Garvey and the UNIA ===
Marcus Garvey's Universal Negro Improvement Association (UNIA) made great strides in organizing in these new communities in the North, and among the internationalist-minded "New Negro" movement in the early 1920s. Garvey's program pointed in the opposite direction from mainstream civil rights organizations such as the NAACP; instead of striving for integration into white-dominated society, Garvey's program of Pan Africanism has become known as Garveyism. It encourages economic independence within the system of racial segregation in the United States, an African Orthodox Church with a black Jesus and black Virgin Mother that offered an alternative to the white Jesus of the black church, and a campaign that urged African Americans to "return to Africa," if not physically, at least in spirit. Garvey attracted thousands of supporters, both in the United States and in the African diaspora in the Caribbean, and claimed eleven million members for the UNIA, which was broadly popular in Northern black communities.

Garvey's movement was a contradictory mix of defeatism, accommodation and separatism: he married themes of self-reliance that Booker T. Washington could have endorsed and the "gospel of success" so popular in white America in the 1920s with a rejection of colonialism worldwide and rejection of racial inferiority. The movement at first attracted many of the foreign-born radicals also associated with the Socialist and Communist parties, but drove many of them away when Garvey began to suspect them of challenging his control.

The movement collapsed nearly as quickly as it blossomed, as the federal government convicted Garvey for mail fraud in 1922 in connection with the movement's financially troubled "Black Star Line". The government commuted Garvey's sentence and deported Garvey to his native Jamaica in 1927. While the movement floundered without him, it inspired other self-help and separatist movements that followed, including Father Divine and the Nation of Islam.

== The Left and civil rights ==
See The Communist Party and African-Americans.

=== The Labor movement ===
The labor movement, with some exceptions, had historically excluded African Americans. While the radical labor organizers who led organizing drives among packinghouse workers in Chicago and Kansas City during World War I and the steel industry in 1919 made determined efforts to appeal to black workers, they were not able to overcome the widespread distrust of the labor movement among black workers in the North. With the ultimate defeat of both of those organizing drives, the black community and the labor movement largely returned to their traditional mutual mistrust.

Left-wing political activists in the labor movement made some progress in the 1920s and 1930s, however, in bridging that gap. A. Philip Randolph, a long-time member of the Socialist Party of America, took the leadership of the fledgling Brotherhood of Sleeping Car Porters (BSCP) at its founding in 1925. Randolph and the union faced opposition not only from the Pullman Company, but from the press and churches within the black community, many of whom were the beneficiaries of financial support from the company. The union eventually won over many of its critics in the black community by wedding its organizing program with the larger goal of black empowerment. The union won recognition from the Pullman Company in 1935 after a ten-year campaign, and a union contract in 1937.

The BSCP became the only black-led union within the American Federation of Labor (AFL) in 1935. Randolph chose to remain within the AFL when the Congress of Industrial Organizations (CIO) split from it. The CIO was much more committed to organizing African-American workers and made strenuous efforts to persuade the BSCP to join it, but Randolph believed more could be done to advance black workers' rights, particularly in the railway industry, by remaining in the AFL, to which the other railway brotherhoods belonged. Randolph remained the voice for black workers within the labor movement, raising demands for elimination of Jim Crow unions within the AFL at every opportunity. BSCP members such as Edgar Nixon played a significant role in the civil rights struggles of the following decades.

Many of the CIO unions, in particular the Packinghouse Workers, the United Auto Workers and the Mine, Mill and Smelter Workers made advocacy of civil rights part of their organizing strategy and bargaining priorities: they gained improvements for workers in meatpacking in Chicago and Omaha, and in the steel and related industries throughout the Midwest. The Transport Workers Union of America, which had strong ties with the Communist Party at the time, entered into coalitions with Adam Clayton Powell Jr., the NAACP and the National Negro Congress to attack employment discrimination in public transit in New York City in the early 1940s.

The CIO was particularly vocal in calling for elimination of racial discrimination by defense industries during World War II; they were also forced to combat racism within their own membership, putting down strikes by white workers who refused to work with black co-workers. While many of these "hate strikes" were short-lived: a wildcat strike launched in Philadelphia in 1944 when the federal government ordered the private transit company to desegregate its workforce lasted two weeks and was ended only when the Roosevelt administration sent troops to guard the system and arrested the strike's ringleaders.

Randolph and the BSCP took the battle against employment discrimination even further, threatening a March on Washington in 1942 if the government did not take steps to outlaw racial discrimination by defense contractors. Randolph limited the March on Washington Movement to black organizations to maintain black leadership; he endured harsh criticism from others on the left for his insistence on black workers' rights in the middle of a war. Randolph only dropped the plan to march after winning substantial concessions from the Roosevelt administration.

=== The Scottsboro Boys ===
In 1931, the NAACP and the Communist Party USA also organized support for the "Scottsboro Boys", nine black teenage boys arrested after a fight with some white men also riding the rails, then convicted and sentenced to death for allegedly raping two white women dressed in men's clothes later found on the same train. The NAACP and the CP fought over the control of those cases and the strategy to be pursued; the CP and its arm the International Labor Defense (ILD) largely prevailed. The ILD's legal campaign produced two significant Supreme Court decisions (Powell v. Alabama and Norris v. Alabama) extending the rights of defendants; its political campaign saved all the defendants from the death sentence and ultimately led to freedom for most of them.

The Scottsboro defense was only one of the ILD's many cases in the South; for a period in the early and mid-1930s, the ILD was the most active defender of blacks' civil rights, and the Communist Party attracted many members among activist African Americans. Its campaigns for black defendants' rights did much to focus national attention on the extreme conditions which black defendants faced in the criminal justice system throughout the South.

=== Foreign pressure ===
Its treatment of African Americans compromised the United States' role as a would-be world leader and champion of democracy. The world challenge from Communism—not to be confused with the actions of the U.S. Communist Party in support of ending discrimination—forced:

...democracies of the West...to divest themselves of antiquated racial attitudes and practices in order to prevent further mergers of anti-imperialist revolutions and Communist revolutions. Incidents in the United States involving Negro discrimination...are given a much bigger play in the neutralist Asian press than they are in America itself.

In addition, the victory over Nazis and Fascists in World War II did much to lay the groundwork for the civil rights movement.

== Regional Council of Negro Leadership ==
On December 28, 1951, T. R. M. Howard, an entrepreneur, surgeon, fraternal leader and planter in Mississippi, founded the Regional Council of Negro Leadership (RCNL) together with other key blacks in the state. At first the RCNL, which was based in the all-black town of Mound Bayou, did not directly challenge "separate but equal" policy, but worked to guarantee the "equal." It often identified inadequate schools as the primary factor responsible for the black exodus to the North. It called for equal school terms for both races, as black schools were historically underfunded. From the beginning, the RCNL also pledged an "all-out fight for unrestricted voting rights."

The RCNL's most famous member was Medgar Evers. Fresh from graduation at Alcorn State University in 1952, he moved to Mound Bayou to sell insurance for Howard. Evers soon became the RCNL's program director and helped to organize a boycott of service stations that failed to provide restrooms for blacks. As part of this campaign, the RCNL distributed an estimated 20,000 bumper stickers with the slogan "Don't Buy Gas Where You Can't Use the Rest Room." Beginning in 1953, it directly challenged "separate but equal" and demanded integration of schools.

The RCNL's annual meetings in Mound Bayou between 1952 and 1955 attracted crowds of 10,000 or more. They featured speeches by Rep. William L. Dawson of Chicago, Rep. Charles Diggs of Michigan, Alderman Archibald Carey Jr. of Chicago, and NAACP attorney Thurgood Marshall. Each of these events, in the words of Myrlie Evers, later Myrlie Evers-Williams, wife of Medgar, constituted "a huge all-day camp meeting: a combination of pep rally, old-time revival, and Sunday church picnic." The conferences also included panels and workshops on voting rights, business ownership, and other issues. Attendance was a life-transforming experience for many future civil black leaders who became prominent in the 1960s, such as Fannie Lou Hamer, Amzie Moore, Aaron Henry, and George W. Lee.

On November 27, 1955, Rosa Parks attended one of these speeches at Dexter Avenue Church in Montgomery. The host for this event was a then relatively unknown Rev. Martin Luther King Jr. Parks later said that she was thinking of Till when she refused to give up her seat four days later.

== See also ==
- African-American history
- African American founding fathers of the United States
- African-American veterans lynched after World War I
- Civil rights movement (1865–1896)
- Civil rights movement
- Destination Freedom – a 1948–1950 radio anthology
- Freedom (American newspaper)
- List of 19th-century African-American civil rights activists
- Nadir of American race relations
- Race and sports
- Southern Negro Youth Congress
- Southern Tenant Farmers Union
- Timeline of racial tension in Omaha, Nebraska
- United States home front during World War I#African-Americans
