= Executive Order 6102 =

1933 U.S. executive order prohibiting the hoarding of gold currency

- Forbidding the Hoarding of Gold Coin, Gold Bullion and Gold Certificates

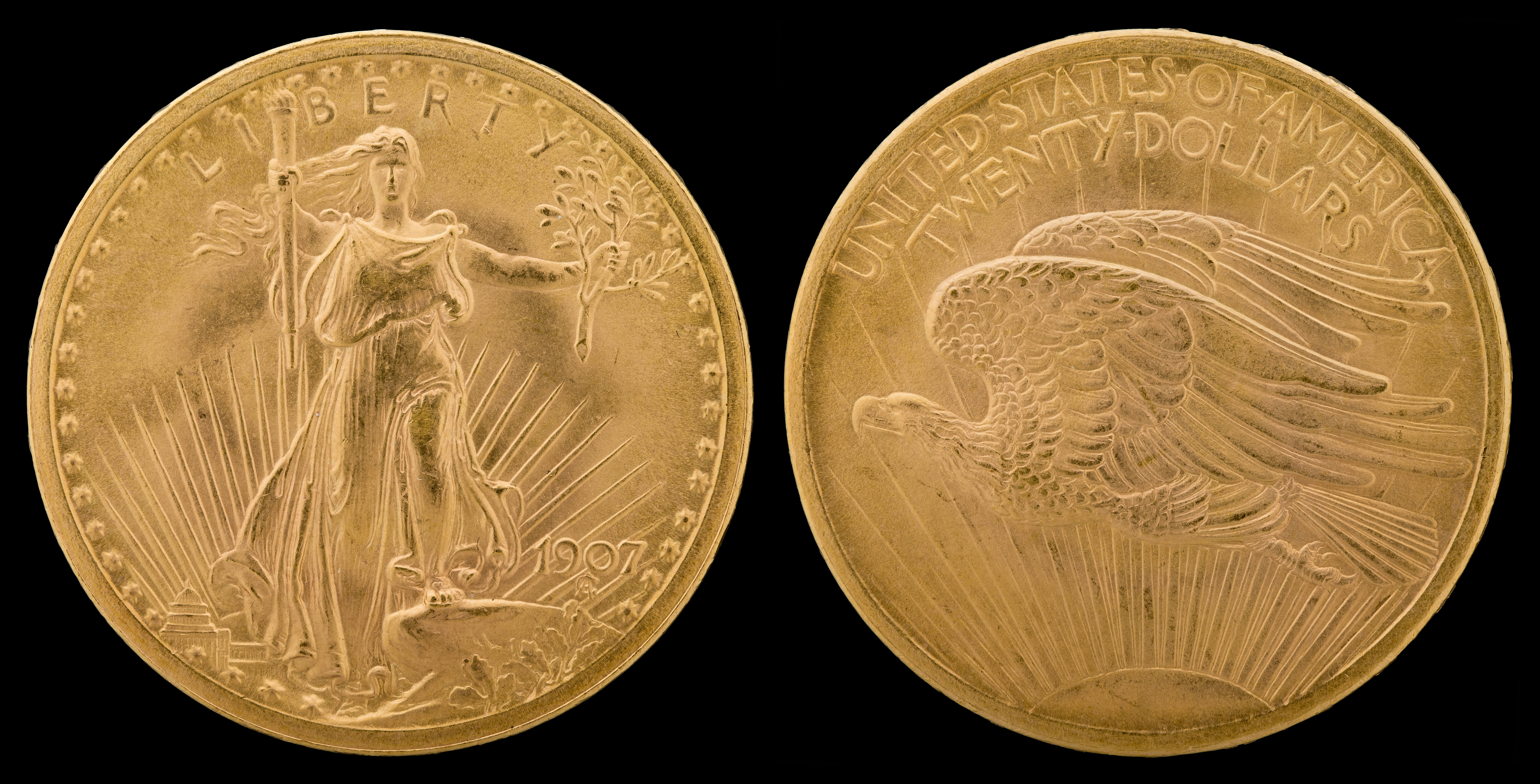
- Saint Gaudens Double Eagle

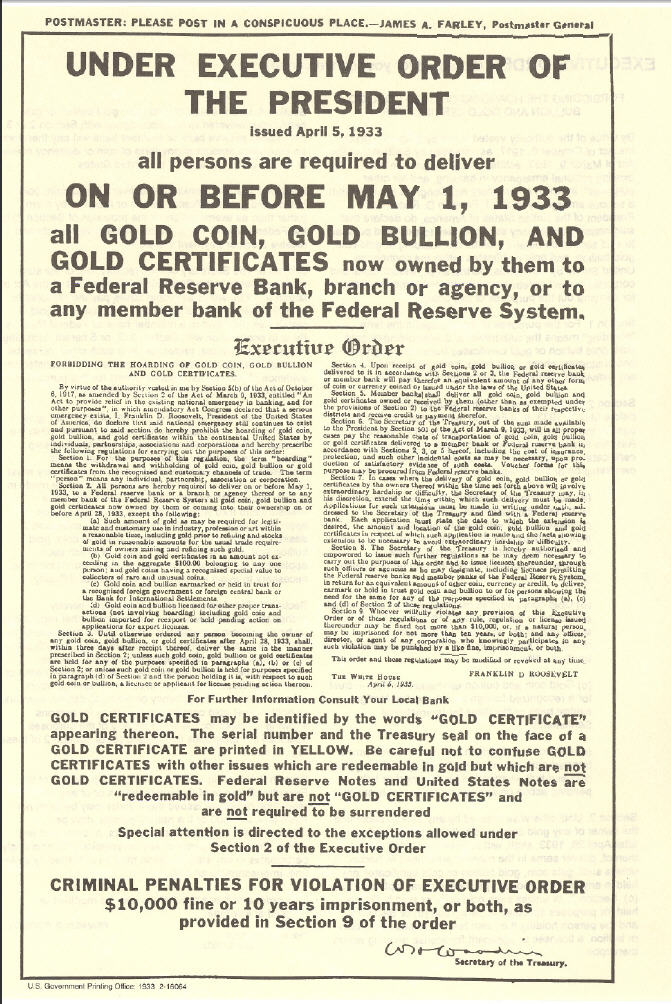
- Executive Order 6102
- Type: Executive order
- Number: 6102
- President: Franklin D. Roosevelt
- Signed: April 5, 1933

Federal Register details
- Publication date: April 5, 1933

Summary
- Forbade ownership of quantities of gold coin, bullion, and gold certificates worth in excess of $100 (about 5 troy ounces), with exemptions for specific uses and collections; Required all persons to deliver excess quantities of the above on or before May 1, 1933 in exchange for $20.67 per troy ounce; Enabled Federal funding of Exchange Stabilization Fund using profit realized from international transactions against new Federal reserves.

Repealed by
- International Development Association Appropriations Act of 1975, December 31, 1974

Executive Order 6102 is an executive order signed on April 5, 1933, by US President Franklin D. Roosevelt forbidding "the hoarding of gold coin, gold bullion, and gold certificates within the continental United States". The executive order was made under the authority of the Trading with the Enemy Act of 1917, as amended by the Emergency Banking Relief Act in March 1933.

At the time and in the years that followed, this policy was highly controversial and faced criticism from those who asserted it was "completely immoral" and "a flagrant violation of the solemn promises made in the Gold Standard Act of 1900" and promises made to purchasers of Liberty and Victory Loans during World War I. The critics also claimed this executive order would lead to an inflation of supply of credit and currency, which would cause a fraudulent economic boom which would inevitably bust and result in a depression.

In 1934, the Gold Reserve Act was passed, changing the statutory gold content of the U.S. Dollar from $20.67 to $35 an ounce. This effectively devalued the dollar, reducing the amount of gold required to back U.S. Currency and enabling the Federal Reserve to expand the money supply.

The limitation on gold ownership in the United States was repealed after President Gerald Ford signed the International Development Association Appropriations Act of 1975, a rider to which legalized private ownership of gold coins, bars, and certificates, and that went into effect December 31, 1974.

== Rationale ==
The stated reason for the order was that hard times had caused "hoarding" of gold, stalling economic growth and worsening the depression inasmuch as the US was then using the gold standard for its currency.

On April 6, 1933, The New York Times wrote, under the headline Hoarding of Gold, "The Executive Order issued by the President yesterday amplifies and particularizes his earlier warnings against hoarding. On March 6, taking advantage of a wartime statute that had not been repealed, he issued Presidential Proclamation 2039 that forbade the hoarding 'of gold or silver coin or bullion or currency', under penalty of $10,000 fine or ten years' imprisonment or both."

The main rationale behind the order was actually to remove the constraint on the Federal Reserve preventing it from increasing the money supply during the depression. The Federal Reserve Act (1913) required 40% gold backing of Federal Reserve Notes that were issued. By the late 1920s, the Federal Reserve had almost reached the limit of allowable credit, in the form of Federal Reserve demand notes, which could be backed by the gold in its possession (see Great Depression).

== Text ==
FORBIDDING THE HOARDING OF GOLD COIN, GOLD BULLION, AND GOLD CERTIFICATES

By virtue of the authority vested in me by Section 5 (b) of the Act of October 6, 1917, as amended by Section 2 of the Act of March 9, 1933, entitled "An Act to provide relief in the existing national emergency in banking, and for other purposes," in which amendatory Act Congress declared that a serious emergency exists, I, Franklin D. Roosevelt, President of the United States of America, do declare that said national emergency still continues to exist and pursuant to said section do hereby prohibit the hoarding of gold coin, gold bullion, and gold certificates within the continental United States by individuals, partnerships, associations and corporations and hereby prescribe the following regulations for carrying out the purposes of this order:

Section 1. For the purposes of this regulation, the term "hoarding" means the withdrawal and withholding of gold coin, gold bullion or gold certificates from the recognized and customary channels of trade. The term "person" means any individual, partnership, association or corporation.

Section 2. All persons are hereby required to deliver on or before May 1, 1933, to a Federal Reserve Bank or a branch or agency thereof or to any member bank of the Federal Reserve System all gold coin, gold bullion and gold certificates now owned by them or coming into their ownership on or before April 28, 1933, except the following:

(a) Such amount of gold as may be required for legitimate and customary use in industry, profession or art within a reasonable time, including gold prior to refining and stocks of gold in reasonable amounts for the usual trade requirements of owners mining and refining such gold.

(b) Gold coin and gold certificates in an amount not exceeding in the aggregate $100 belonging to any one person; and gold coins having a recognized special value to collectors of rare and unusual coins.

(c) Gold coin and bullion earmarked or held in trust for a recognized foreign Government or foreign central bank or the Bank for International Settlements.

(d) Gold coin and bullion licensed for other proper transactions (not involving hoarding) including gold coin and bullion imported for reexport or held pending action on applications for export licenses.

Section 3. Until otherwise ordered any person becoming the owner of any gold coin, gold bullion, or gold certificates after April 28, 1933, shall, within three days after receipt thereof, deliver the same in the manner prescribed in Section 2; unless such gold coin, gold bullion or gold certificates are held for any of the purposes specified in paragraphs (a), (b), or (c) of Section 2; or unless such gold coin or gold bullion is held for purposes specified in paragraph (d) of Section 2 and the person holding it is, with respect to such gold coin or bullion, a licensee or applicant for license pending action thereon.

Section 4. Upon receipt of gold coin, gold bullion or gold certificates delivered to it in accordance with Sections 2 or 3, the Federal Reserve Bank or member bank will pay therefor an equivalent amount of any other form of coin or currency coined or issued under the laws of the United States.

Section 5. Member banks shall deliver all gold coin, gold bullion and gold certificates owned or received by them (other than as exempted under the provisions of Section 2) to the Federal Reserve Banks of their respective districts and receive credit or payment therefor.

Section 6. The Secretary of the Treasury, out of the sum made available to the President by Section 501 of the Act of March 9, 1933, will in all proper cases pay the reasonable costs of transportation of gold coin, gold bullion or gold certificates delivered to a member bank or Federal Reserve Bank in accordance with Section 2, 3, or 5 hereof, including the cost of insurance, protection, and such other incidental costs as may be necessary, upon production of satisfactory evidence of such costs. Voucher forms for this purpose may be procured from Federal Reserve Banks.

Section 7. In cases where the delivery of gold coin, gold bullion or gold certificates by the owners thereof within the time set forth above will involve extraordinary hardship or difficulty, the Secretary of the Treasury may, in his discretion, extend the time within which such delivery must be made. Applications for such extensions must be made in writing under oath, addressed to the Secretary of the Treasury and filed with a Federal Reserve Bank. Each application must state the date to which the extension is desired, the amount and location of the gold coin, gold bullion and gold certificates in respect of which such application is made and the facts showing extension to be necessary to avoid extraordinary hardship or difficulty.

Section 8. The Secretary of the Treasury is hereby authorized and empowered to issue such further regulations as he may deem necessary to carry out the purposes of this order and to issue licenses thereunder, through such officers or agencies as he may designate, including licenses permitting the Federal Reserve Banks and member banks of the Federal Reserve System, in return for an equivalent amount of other coin, currency or credit, to deliver, earmark or hold in trust gold coin and bullion to or for persons showing the need for the same for any of the purposes specified in paragraphs (a), (c) and (d) of Section 2 of these regulations.

Section 9. Whoever willfully violates any provision of this Executive Order or of these regulations or of any rule, regulation or license issued thereunder may be fined not more than $10,000, or, if a natural person, may be imprisoned for not more than ten years, or both; and any officer, director, or agent of any corporation who knowingly participates in any such violation may be punished by a like fine, imprisonment, or both.

This order and these regulations may be modified or revoked at any time.

FRANKLIN D ROOSEVELT

The White House,

April 5, 1933.

For Further Information Consult Your Local Bank

GOLD CERTIFICATES may be identified by the words "GOLD CERTIFICATE” appearing thereon. The serial number and the Treasury seal on the face of a GOLD CERTIFICATE are printed in YELLOW. Be careful not to confuse GOLD CERTIFICATES with other issues which are redeemable in gold but which are not

GOLD CERTIFICATES. Federal Reserve Notes and United States Notes are "redeemable in gold" but are not "GOLD CERTIFICATES" and

are not required to be surrendered.

Special attention is directed to the exceptions allowed under Section 2 of the Executive Order

CRIMINAL PENALTIES FOR VIOLATION OF EXECUTIVE ORDER

$10,000 fine or 10 years imprisonment, or both, as provided in Section 9 of the order

== Effects ==
Executive Order 6102 required all persons to deliver on or before May 1, 1933, all but a small amount of gold coin, gold bullion, and gold certificates owned by them to the Federal Reserve in exchange for $20.67 (equivalent to $514 in 2025) per troy ounce. Under the Trading with the Enemy Act of 1917, as amended by the recently passed Emergency Banking Act of March 9, 1933, a violation of the order was punishable by fine up to $10,000 (equivalent to $249,000 in 2025), up to ten years in prison, or both.

The order specifically exempted "customary use in industry, profession or art", a provision that covered artists, jewelers, dentists, sign-makers, etc. The order also permitted any person to hold up to $100 in gold coins, a face value equivalent to 5 troy ounces (160 g) of gold valued at approximately $21,600 as of January 2026. The same paragraph also exempted "gold coins having recognized special value to collectors of rare and unusual coins", which protected recognized gold coin collections from legal seizure.

The 1934 Gold Reserve Act subsequently changed the statutory gold content of the U.S. Dollar from $20.67 to $35 an ounce. While this might be seen by some as a move that increased the value of gold, it actually merely devalued the U.S. Dollar so that less gold was required to back U.S. Currency, and the Federal Reserve was free to print more paper money. All international transactions by the U.S. Treasury were afterward calculated with the new valuation for gold at $35 an ounce (equivalent to $871 in 2025). The resulting profit that the federal government realized funded the Exchange Stabilization Fund, also established by the Gold Reserve Act.

The regulations prescribed in the executive order were modified by Executive Order 6111 on April 20, 1933, both of which were ultimately revoked and superseded by Executive Orders 6260 and 6261 on August 28 and 29, 1933, respectively.

Executive Order 6102 also led to the extreme rarity of the 1933 Double Eagle gold coin. The order caused all gold coin production to cease and all 1933 minted coins to be destroyed. About 20 such coins were stolen, leading to an outstanding US Secret Service warrant for arrest and confiscation of the coins. One surviving coin, legalized long after transfer to a foreign head of state, sold for over $7.5 million in 2002, making it one of the most valuable coins in the world.

== Prosecutions ==
Numerous individuals and companies were prosecuted related to Roosevelt's Executive Order 6102. The prosecutions took place under the subsequent Executive Orders 6111, 6260, 6261 and the Gold Reserve Act of 1934.

There was a need to amend Executive Order 6102, as the one prosecution under the order was ruled invalid by Federal Judge John M. Woolsey on the grounds that the order was signed by the President, instead of the Secretary of the Treasury as required. A New York attorney named Frederick Barber Campbell had a deposit at Chase National Bank of over 5,000 troy ounces (160 kg) of gold. When Campbell attempted to withdraw the gold, Chase refused and Campbell sued Chase. A federal prosecutor indicted Campbell the following day, September 27, 1933, for failing to surrender his gold. Ultimately, the prosecution of Campbell failed but the authority of the federal government to seize gold was upheld, and Campbell's gold was confiscated.

The case caused the Roosevelt administration to issue a new order under the signature of the Secretary of the Treasury, Henry Morgenthau Jr. Executive Orders 6260, and 6261 provided for the seizure of gold and the prosecution of gold hoarders. A few months later Congress passed the Gold Reserve Act of 1934, which gave legislative permanence to Roosevelt's orders. A new set of Treasury regulations was issued providing civil penalties of confiscation of all gold and imposition of fines equal to double the value of the gold seized.

Prosecutions of US citizens and noncitizens followed the new orders, among which were a few notable cases:

- Gus Farber, a diamond and jewelry merchant from San Francisco, was prosecuted for the sale of thirteen $20 gold coins without a license. Secret Service agents discovered the sale with the help of the buyer. Farber, his father, and 12 others were arrested in four American cities after a sting operation conducted by the Secret Service. The arrests took place simultaneously in New York and three California cities: San Francisco, San Jose, and Oakland. Morris Anolik was arrested in New York with $5,000 in U.S. and foreign gold coins; Dan Levin and Edward Friedman of San Jose were arrested with $15,000 in gold; Sam Nankin was arrested in Oakland; in San Francisco, nine men were arrested on charges of hoarding gold. In all, $24,000 in gold was seized by Secret Service Agents during the operation.
- David Baraban and his son Jacob owned a refining company. The Barabans' license to deal in unmelted scrap gold was revoked and so the Barabans operated their refining business under a license issued to a Minnie Sarch. The Barabans admitted that Minnie Sarch had nothing to do with the business and that she had obtained the license so that the Barabans could continue to deal in gold. The Barabans had a cigar box full of gold-filled scrap jewelry visible in one of the showcases. Government agents raided the Barabans' business and found another hidden box of US and foreign gold coins. The coins were seized and Baraban was charged with conspiracy to defraud the United States.
- Louis Ruffino was an individual indicted on three counts purporting to violations of the Trading with the Enemy Act of 1917, which restricted trade with countries hostile to the United States. Eventually, Ruffino appealed the conviction to the 9th District Circuit Court of Appeals in 1940; however, the judgment of the lower courts was upheld, based on the President's executive orders and the Gold Reserve Act of 1934. Ruffino, a resident of Sutter Creek in California gold country, was convicted of possessing 78 ounces of gold and was sentenced to 6 months in jail and a $500 fine, and had his gold seized.

Foreigners also had gold confiscated and were forced to accept paper money for their gold. The Uebersee Finanz-Korporation, a Swiss banking company, had $1,250,000 in gold coins for business use. The Uebersee Finanz-Korporation entrusted the gold to an American firm for safekeeping, and the Swiss were shocked to find that their gold was confiscated. The Swiss made appeals, but they were denied; they were entitled to paper money but not their gold. The Swiss company would have lost 40% of their gold's value if they had tried to buy the same amount of gold with the paper money that they received in exchange for their confiscated gold.

Another type of de facto gold seizure occurred as a result of the various executive orders involving bonds, gold certificates and private contracts. Private contracts or bonds that were written in terms of gold were to be paid in paper currency instead of gold although all of the contracts and the bonds proclaimed that they were payable in gold, and at least one, the fourth Liberty Bond, was a federal instrument. The plaintiffs in all cases received paper money, instead of gold, despite the contracts' terms. The contracts and the bonds were written precisely to avoid currency debasement by requiring payment in gold coin. The paper money which was redeemable in gold was instead irredeemable based on Nortz v. United States, 294 U.S. 317 (1935). The consolidated Gold Clause Cases were:

- Perry v. United States, 294 U.S. 330 (1935)
- U.S. v. Bankers' Trust Co., 294 U.S. 240 (1935)
- Norman v. Baltimore & Ohio R. Co., 294 U.S. 240 (1935)
- Nortz v. United States, 294 U.S. 317 (1935)

The Supreme Court upheld all seizures as constitutional, with Justices James Clark McReynolds, Willis Van Devanter, George Sutherland, and Pierce Butler dissenting. The four justices were labelled the "Four Horsemen" by the press, as their conservative views were in opposition to Roosevelt's New Deal supported by the press.

== Subsequent events and abrogation ==
The Gold Reserve Act of 1934 made contractual gold clauses unenforceable. It also allowed the President to change the gold content of the US dollar by proclamation. Immediately following its passage, Roosevelt changed the gold content of the dollar from $20.67 to $35 per ounce, thereby devaluing US federal reserve notes, which were backed on gold. That valuation remained in effect until August 15, 1971, when President Richard Nixon announced that the US would no longer value the US dollar with a fixed amount of gold, thus abandoning the gold standard for foreign exchange (see Nixon Shock).

The private ownership of gold certificates was legalized in 1964, and they can be openly owned by collectors but are not redeemable in gold. The limitation on gold ownership in the US was repealed after President Gerald Ford signed the International Development Association Appropriations Act of 1975 (Pub. L. 93–373) and to "permit United States citizens to purchase, hold, sell, or otherwise deal with gold in the United States or abroad", which went into effect December 31, 1974. However, the Act did not repeal the Gold Repeal Joint Resolution, which banned any contracts that specified payment in a fixed amount of money as gold or a fixed amount of gold. That is, contracts remained unenforceable if they used gold monetarily, rather than as a commodity of trade. However, an Act enacted on Oct. 28, 1977, Pub. L. No. 95-147, § 4(c), 91 Stat. 1227, 1229 (originally codified at 31 U.S.C. § 463 note, recodified as amended at 31 U.S.C. § 5118(d)(2)) amended the 1933 Joint Resolution to make it clear that parties could again include so-called gold clauses in contracts made after 1977.

== Hoax of safe deposit box seizures ==
According to a hoax, Roosevelt ordered all safe deposit boxes in the country seized and searched for gold by an official of the Internal Revenue Service. A typical example of the text of the alleged order reads:

By Executive Order Of The President of The United States, March 9, 1933.

By virtue of the authority vested in me by Section 5 (b) of the Act of October 6, 1917, as amended by Section 2 of the Act of March 9, 1933, in which Congress declared that a serious emergency exists, I as President, do declare that the national emergency still exists; that the continued private hoarding of gold and silver by subjects of the United States poses a grave threat to the peace, equal justice, and well-being of the United States; and that appropriate measures must be taken immediately to protect the interests of our people.

Therefore ... I hereby proclaim that such gold and silver holdings are prohibited, and that all such coin, bullion or other possessions of gold and silver be tendered within fourteen days to agents of the Government ... for compensation at the official price, in the legal tender of the Government.

All safe deposit boxes in banks or financial institutions have been sealed. ... All sales or purchases or movements of such gold and silver ... are hereby prohibited.

Your possession ... and/or safe deposit box to store them is known by the government from bank and insurance records. Therefore ... your vault box must remain sealed, and may only be opened in the presence of an agent of the Internal Revenue Service.

By lawful order ..., the President of the United States.

The first known reference to the hoax was in the book After the Crash: Life In the New Great Depression. The fake text refers only to gold, not to silver, which was added by 1998 to Internet references. It claims to be an executive order, but its text was written it to apply to specific individuals ("Your possession"), and so if the text originated from the government, it would have been sent to individuals, not published as an executive order. The first paragraph starts with the actual text of Executive Order 6102, then edits it slightly (changing "said national emergency" to "a national emergency" and "still continues to exist" to "still exists") and then adds invented text. The minor edits and the way that the real text and fake text are combined mid-sentence make it almost certainly an intentionally designed hoax, rather than an accident.

Most of the text does not appear in the actual executive order. In fact, safe deposit boxes held by individuals were not forcibly searched or seized under the order, and the few prosecutions that occurred in the 1930s for gold "hoarding" were executed under different statutes. One of the few such cases occurred in 1936, when a safe deposit box containing over 10,000 troy ounces (310 kg) of gold belonging to Zelik Josefowitz, who was not a US citizen, was seized with a search warrant as part of a prosecution for tax evasion.

The US Treasury also came into possession of a large number of safe deposit boxes due to bank failures. During the 1930s, over 3000 banks failed, and the contents of their safe deposit boxes were remanded to the custody of the Treasury. If no one claimed the box, it remained in the possession of the Treasury. In October 1981, there were 1605 cardboard cartons in the basement of the Treasury, each carton containing the contents of one unclaimed safe deposit box.

== Similar laws in other countries ==
In Poland, a similar regulation was issued on November 7, 1919, which forced citizens to sell their gold and silver to the state. A month later, it was extended until January 31, 1920. It was repealed on 6 February 1920.

In Australia, Part IV of the Banking Act 1959 allows the Commonwealth government to seize private citizens' gold in return for paper money where the Governor-General is satisfied that it is expedient so to do, for the protection of the currency or of the public credit of the Commonwealth. On January 30, 1976, the operation of that part of the Act was suspended.

The United Kingdom introduced the gold trade ban law in 1966 (Exchange Control (Gold Coins Exemption) Order 1966, which revoked most exceptions to the general ban enacted by the Exchange Control Act 1947). It became illegal for UK residents to continue to hold more than four gold coins dated after 1817, or to buy any gold coins unless they obtain collector licence from Bank of England. The reasoning was to prevent people from hoarding the gold, while the cost of living and inflation increased. This act was repealed in 1971.

== See also ==
- Causes of the Great Depression
- Emergency Banking Act March 9, 1933
- Executive Order 6814, a similar Order pertaining to silver, signed in 1934
- Fiat money
- Gold
- Gold Clause Cases
- Great Contraction
- Gold Standard
