= Patterson v. Alabama =

- Supreme Court of the United States

Argued February 15–18, 1935 Decided April 1, 1935
- Full case name: Patterson v. Alabama
- Citations: 294 U.S. 600 (more) 55 S. Ct. 575; 79 L. Ed. 1082

Case history
- Prior: Patterson v. State, 229 Ala. 270, 156 So. 567 (1934); cert. granted, 293 U.S. 554 (1935).

Holding
- An African-American defendant is denied due process rights if the jury pool excludes African Americans.

Court membership
- Chief Justice Charles E. Hughes Associate Justices Willis Van Devanter · James C. McReynolds; Louis Brandeis · George Sutherland; Pierce Butler · Harlan F. Stone; Owen Roberts · Benjamin N. Cardozo

Case opinion
- Majority: Hughes, joined by Van Devanter, Brandeis, Sutherland, Butler, Stone, Roberts, Cardozo
- McReynolds took no part in the consideration or decision of the case.

Laws applied
- U.S. Const. amends. I, XIV

Patterson v. Alabama, 294 U.S. 600 (1935), was a United States Supreme Court case which held that an African-American defendant is denied due process rights if the jury pool excludes African-Americans.

== Background ==
This case was the second landmark decision arising out of the Scottsboro Boys trials (the first was the 1932 case, Powell v. Alabama). Haywood Patterson, along with several other African-American defendants, were tried for raping two white women in 1931 in Scottsboro, Alabama. The trials were rushed, there was virtually no legal counsel, and no African-Americans were permitted in the jury. All defendants, including Patterson, were convicted. The Communist Party of the United States assisted the defendants and appealed to the Supreme Court, which overturned the convictions in 1932 (in the Powell v. Alabama decision) due to lack of legal counsel.

A second set of trials was then held in Decatur, Alabama. In spite of lack of evidence, the jury sentenced Patterson to death in the electric chair. Judge James Edwin Horton overturned the verdict, and a third trial was held in 1933. The third trial also resulted in a death penalty verdict. No African Americans were included in any of the juries, nor were any ever considered for jury duty in Alabama. This decision was appealed to the Supreme Court, on the basis that the absence of African Americans from the jury pool denied the defendants due process.

The Supreme Court agreed, and the convictions were overturned.

In 1936, the defendants were tried, some for the fourth time, again for rape. In this trial, the verdicts were again guilty, but sentences were long prison terms rather than the death penalty.

== Notes and references ==
- Patterson, Haywood; Conrad, Earl (1950). Scottsboro boy. Doubleday. ISBN 978-1-59740-102-9.
