= Continental Illinois National Bank & Trust Co. v. Chicago, Rock Island & Pacific Railroad Co. =

Continental Illinois National Bank and Trust Co. v. Chicago, Rock Island and Pacific Railroad Co.
- Supreme Court of the United States

Decided April 1, 1935
- Full case name: Continental Illinois National Bank & Trust Co. v. Chicago, Rock Island & Pacific Railroad Co.
- Citations: 294 U.S. 648 (more)

Holding
- Congress may use its bankruptcy power to nullify obligations from private contracts that existed before the enaction of the bankruptcy legislation.

Court membership
- Chief Justice Charles E. Hughes Associate Justices Willis Van Devanter · James C. McReynolds; Louis Brandeis · George Sutherland; Pierce Butler · Harlan F. Stone; Owen Roberts · Benjamin N. Cardozo

Case opinion
- Majority: Sutherland, joined by unanimous

Laws applied
- Bankruptcy Clause

Continental Illinois National Bank and Trust Co. v. Chicago, Rock Island and Pacific Railroad Co., 294 U.S. 648 (1935), was a United States Supreme Court case in which the court held that Congress may use its bankruptcy power to nullify obligations from private contracts that existed before the enaction of the bankruptcy legislation.

== Significance ==
This case stands for the proposition that Congress must have an enumerated power at its disposal to enact legislation. Congress does not have an enumerated power that would allow it to destroy contracts generally. However, according to the court in this case, Congress's powers to enact "uniform laws on the subject of bankruptcies throughout the United States" is broad enough to encompass that in the bankruptcy context specifically.

== See also ==
- Calder v. Bull
- Legal Tender Cases
