= Emergency Banking Act of 1933 =

Great Depression-era U.S. legislation to stabilize the banking system

Emergency Banking Relief Act
- Other short titles: Bank Conservation Act of 1933; Emergency Banking Relief Act of 1933
- Long title: An Act to provide relief in the existing national emergency in banking, and for other purposes.
- Enacted by: the 73rd United States Congress

Citations
- Public law: Pub. L. 73–1
- Statutes at Large: 48 Stat. 1

Legislative history
- Introduced in the House as H.R. 1491 by Henry B. Steagall (D-AL) on March 9, 1933; Passed the House on March 9, 1933 (Passed (435–0)); Passed the Senate on March 9, 1933 (Passed (96–0)); Signed into law by President Franklin D. Roosevelt on March 9, 1933

The Emergency Banking Relief Act (E.B.R.A.) (Pub. L. 73–1, 48 Stat. 1, enacted March 9, 1933) was an act passed by the United States Congress in March 1933 in an attempt to stabilize the banking system.

The act authorized the Federal Reserve to issue additional currency to banks that were deemed solvent without the requirement that these reserves be backed by gold. One month following the passage of this act, President Roosevelt signed Executive Order 6102 criminalizing the possession of monetary gold by any individual, partnership, association or corporation.

== Bank holiday ==
Beginning on February 14, 1933, Michigan, an industrial state that had been hit particularly hard by the Great Depression in the United States, declared an eight-day bank holiday. Fears of other bank closures spread from state to state as people rushed to withdraw their deposits while they still could do so. Within weeks, all other states held their own bank holidays in an attempt to stem the bank runs, with Delaware becoming the 48th and last state to close its banks on March 4.

Following his inauguration on March 4, 1933, President Franklin Roosevelt set out to rebuild confidence in the nation's banking system and to stabilize America's banking system. On March 6, he declared a four-day national banking holiday that kept all banks shut until Congress could act. During this time, the federal government would inspect all banks, re-open those that were sufficiently solvent, re-organize those that could be saved, and close those that were beyond repair.

== Passage of the Emergency Banking Act ==
Fireside Chat 1 On the Banking Crisis
Roosevelt's first fireside chat on the Banking Crisis (March 12, 1933)

A draft law, prepared by the Treasury staff during Herbert Hoover's administration, was passed on March 9, 1933. The new law allowed the twelve Federal Reserve Banks to issue additional currency on good assets so that banks that reopened would be able to meet every legitimate call. The Emergency Banking Act, an amendment to the Trading with the Enemy Act of 1917, was introduced on March 9, 1933, to a special session of Congress, and was passed the same evening amid an atmosphere of chaos and uncertainty as over 100 new Democratic members of Congress swept into power determined to take radical steps to address banking failures and other economic malaise.

The EBA was one of President Roosevelt's first projects in the first 100 days of his presidency. The sense of urgency was such that the act was passed with only a single copy available on the floor of the House of Representatives and legislators voted on it after the bill was read aloud to them by Chairman of the House Banking Committee Henry Steagall. Copies were made available to senators as the bill was being proposed in the Senate, after it had passed in the House.

According to William L. Silber: "The Emergency Banking Act of 1933, passed by Congress on March 9, 1933, three days after FDR declared a nationwide bank holiday, combined with the Federal Reserve's commitment to supply unlimited amounts of currency to reopened banks, created 100 percent deposit insurance".

On March 12, the evening before banks began to reopen, FDR gave his first fireside chat, a national radio address explaining the alterations made by the federal government on the banking industry. Due to confidence in FDR and the proposed alterations, Americans returned $1 billion to bank vaults in the following week.

== Public reaction ==
When the institutions reopened for business on March 13, 1933, depositors stood in line to return their stashed cash to neighborhood banks. Within two weeks, Americans had redeposited more than half of the currency that they had legally withdrawn before the bank suspension.

On March 15, 1933, the first day of stock trading after the extended closure of Wall Street, the Dow Jones Industrial Average, gaining 8.26 points to close at 62.10; a gain of 15.34%. As of October 2025, the gain still stands as the largest one-day percentage price increase ever. In hindsight, the nationwide Bank Holiday and the Emergency Banking Act of March 1933 are seen to have ended the bank runs that plagued the Great Depression.

== Possession of monetary gold becomes a crime ==
One month later, on April 5, 1933, President Roosevelt signed Executive Order 6102 criminalizing the possession of monetary gold by any individual, partnership, association or corporation and Congress passed a similar resolution in June 1933.

== 1933 Banking Act ==
This act was a temporary response to a major problem and remains in effect to this day. The 1933 Banking Act passed later that year presented elements of longer-term response, including the formation of the Federal Deposit Insurance Corporation (FDIC).

== See also ==
- Causes of the Great Depression
- Executive Order 6102
- Gold Clause Cases
- Great Contraction
