= Jurney v. MacCracken =

- Supreme Court of the United States

Argued January 7–8, 1935 Decided February 4, 1935
- Full case name: Jurney v. MacCracken
- Citations: 294 U.S. 125 (more) 55 S. Ct. 375; 79 L. Ed. 802; 1935 U.S. LEXIS 42

Case history
- Prior: Judgment for defendants, 63 App. D.C. 342; 72 F. (2d) 560; cert. granted, 293 U.S. 543

Holding
- The Congress has the implicit power to find a person in contempt.

Court membership
- Chief Justice Charles E. Hughes Associate Justices Willis Van Devanter · James C. McReynolds; Louis Brandeis · George Sutherland; Pierce Butler · Harlan F. Stone; Owen Roberts · Benjamin N. Cardozo

Case opinion
- Majority: Brandeis, joined by Hughes, Van Devanter, Sutherland, Butler, Stone, Roberts, Cardozo
- McReynolds took no part in the consideration or decision of the case.

Jurney v. MacCracken, 294 U.S. 125 (1935), was a case in which the Supreme Court of the United States held that Congress has an implicit power to find one in contempt of Congress. During a Senate investigation of airlines and of the U.S. Postmaster General, the attorney William P. MacCracken, Jr. allowed his clients to destroy subpoenaed documents. After a one-week trial on the Senate floor (presided over by the Vice-President of the United States, acting as Senate President), MacCracken, a lawyer and former Assistant Secretary of Commerce for Aeronautics, was found guilty and sentenced to 10 days imprisonment. MacCracken filed a petition of habeas corpus with the federal courts to overturn his arrest, but, after litigation, the U.S. Supreme Court ruled that Congress had acted constitutionally, and denied the petition.

The respondent, Chesley W. Jurney, was the Sergeant at Arms of the Senate, and hence the person with custody of MacCracken.

== See also ==
- Contempt of Congress
- Air Mail scandal
