= Baldwin v. G.A.F. Seelig, Inc. =

Baldwin v. G. A. F. Seelig, Inc.
- Supreme Court of the United States

Argued February 11–12, 1935 Decided March 4, 1935
- Full case name: Baldwin, Commissioner of Agriculture and Markets, et al. v. G. A. F. Seelig, Inc.
- Citations: 294 U.S. 511 (more) 55 S. Ct. 497; 79 L. Ed. 1032

Case history
- Prior: Appeal from the District of the United States for the Southern District of New York

Holding
- It is a violation of the Commerce Clause for a state to regulate intrastate prices by prohibiting the importation of less expensive goods in interstate commerce.

Court membership
- Chief Justice Charles E. Hughes Associate Justices Willis Van Devanter · James C. McReynolds; Louis Brandeis · George Sutherland; Pierce Butler · Harlan F. Stone; Owen Roberts · Benjamin N. Cardozo

Case opinion
- Majority: Cardozo, joined by unanimous

Laws applied
- U.S. Const. art. I sec. 8 clause 3 New York Milk Control Act

Baldwin v. G. A. F. Seelig, Inc., 294 U.S. 511 (1935), was a United States Supreme Court case which held that a state may not regulate intrastate prices by prohibiting the importation of less expensive goods in interstate commerce. It established the principle that one state, in its dealings with another, cannot place itself in economic isolation.

== Background ==
In 1933, the New York State Legislature passed a law which imposed a system of minimum prices to be paid by dealers to producers of milk. The law included a protective measure extending its application to milk from other states, thus ensuring that the prices set would not be undercut by cheaper imports. If the producer in the exporting state had been paid less for his milk than the prices fixed by the statute, it was illegal to sell or purchase the milk in New York. The purpose of the law was to assure an adequate local supply of wholesome milk and to secure the economic welfare of local producers.

G. A. F. Seelig was a milk dealer in New York City who purchased milk from its parent company in Vermont. GAF purchased approximately 220 cans of milk and cream every day, 90% of which was sold in original cans to hotels, restaurants and larger facilities, with the remaining 10% repackaged in individual bottles and sold directly to consumers. The prices paid to the producer was lower than those prescribed by the New York law. Baldwin, the state farms and market commissioner, refused to license GAF's business because the dealer declined to sign an agreement to conform to the statute. As New York officials moved to prosecute the company for trading without a license, GAF brought suit against the state, in the person of Baldwin and other officials. In 1934, the United States District Court for the Southern District of New York issued a split decision, holding that GAF had the right to resell the milk in "original packaging", but not that which had been repackaged in individual bottles. Both parties appealed to the Supreme Court.

== Opinion of the Court ==
In a unanimous decision, the law was held unconstitutional. Justice Benjamin N. Cardozo delivered the opinion of the Court. First, Cardozo held that the district court had correctly issued an injunction to enjoin enforcement of the law as it applied to the milk in original packaging. A statewide prohibition on trade in goods acquired to lower prices in interstate commerce was the equivalent of a customs tariff. Imposts or duties on interstate commerce were beyond the legislative power of the state, and could only be imposed by Congress, in accordance with the Commerce Clause. The chief purpose of the clause, Cardozo contended, was to avoid economic retaliation between states. In effect, state protectionism subverted the goal of fair and impartial competition within the union:

If New York, in order to promote the economic welfare of her farmers, may guard them against competition with the cheaper prices of Vermont, the door has been opened to rivalries and reprisals that were meant to be averted by subjecting commerce between the states to the power of the nation.

Viewed in this light, the state's purported primary purpose of securing the health of its citizens was equally untenable. Intervention due to health concerns could not be sustained if it adversely affected the economic well-being of the nation. Exemptions made for protectionist measures each time a state experienced discomfiture would soon bring an end to union identity:

To give entrance to that excuse would be to invite a speedy end of our national solidarity. The Constitution was framed under the dominion of a political philosophy less parochial in range. It was framed upon the theory that the peoples of the several states must sink or swim together, and that, in the long run, prosperity and salvation are in union, and not division.

Second, Cardozo held that the district court had erred in refusing to issue an injunction enjoining the enforcement of the law as it applied to the rebottled milk. The Court had previously employed an "original packaging"-test in evaluating the legality of commerce with other countries. However, this test could not be adapted in whole to interstate commerce: it was, in Cardozo's words, "not an ultimate principle (...) [but] an illustration of a principle."

What is ultimate is the principle that one state, in its dealings with another, may not place itself in a position of economic isolation. Formulas and catchwords are subordinate to this overmastering requirement. Neither the power to tax nor the police power may be used by the state of destination with the aim and effect of establishing an economic barrier against competition with the products of another state or the labor of its residents. Restrictions so contrived are an unreasonable clog upon the mobility of commerce.
