= Gold Clause Cases =

- Supreme Court of the United States

Argued January 8–10, 1935 Decided February 18, 1935
- Full case name: Norman v. Baltimore & Ohio R. Co; United States v. Bankers Trust Co.; Nortz v. United States; Perry v. United States
- Citations: 294 U.S. 240 (more) 55 S. Ct. 407; 79 L. Ed. 885; 1935 U.S. LEXIS 257; 95 A.L.R. 1352

Holding
- Congress has power expressly to prohibit and invalidate contracts, although previously made and valid when made, when they interfere with carrying out any monetary policy Congress is free to adopt.

Court membership
- Chief Justice Charles E. Hughes Associate Justices Willis Van Devanter · James C. McReynolds; Louis Brandeis · George Sutherland; Pierce Butler · Harlan F. Stone; Owen Roberts · Benjamin N. Cardozo

Case opinions
- Majority: Hughes, joined by Brandeis, Stone, Roberts, Cardozo
- Concurrence: Stone
- Dissent: McReynolds, joined by Van Devanter, Sutherland, Butler

Laws applied
- U.S. Const. art. I, § 8, cl. 3.; U.S. Const. art. I, § 8, cl. 5.; U.S. Const. art. I, § 8, cl. 18. U.S. Const. amend. XIV

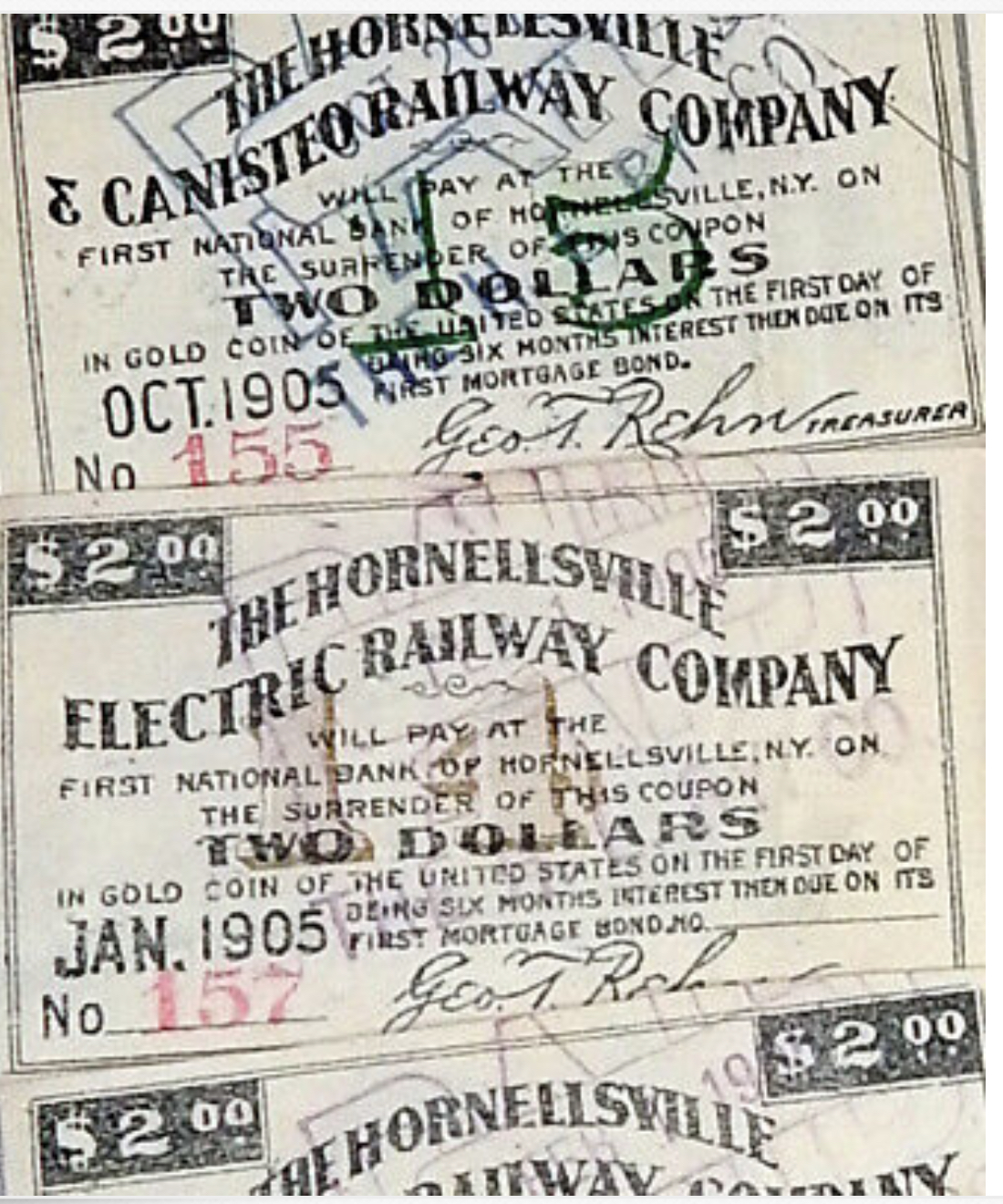
Bond coupons payable in gold

The Gold Clause Cases were a series of actions brought before the Supreme Court of the United States, in which the court narrowly upheld the Roosevelt administration's adjustment of the gold standard in response to the Great Depression.

== Background ==
Until the 1930s, business contracts in the United States regularly included gold clauses that allowed creditors to demand payment in gold or gold equivalents. The tightening of Federal Reserve policy from 1928 onward prompted a global unwinding of credit later dubbed the Great Contraction. Waves of bank failures occurred, aggravated by reliance on single-location banks (unit banks) that could not survive a run. A final bank panic in February 1933 saw widespread hoarding of gold and currency as well as international drains on gold reserves. Roosevelt started his term with banking suspended in most states and domestic gold reserves seriously depleted.

With support from Congress, Roosevelt enacted a series of banking and currency reforms that effectively nationalized monetary gold. These included the Emergency Banking Act which authorized the President to prohibit international gold payments, Executive Order 6102 which required the surrender of all privately held monetary gold in exchange for currency, and the Gold Clause Resolution (Pub. Res. 73–10) which voided all gold clauses within the United States. The following year, under the Gold Reserve Act, the government took ownership of the Federal Reserve's gold stocks and devalued the dollar. Multiple cases were filed in response and made their way to the Supreme Court.

== Cases ==
Norman v. Baltimore & Ohio Railroad Co. with United States v. Bankers Trust Co. 294 U.S. 240 (1935): The bearer of a $22.50 bond coupon of the Baltimore & Ohio Railroad demanded payment of $38.10, the value of the coupon's gold obligation based on the statutory price of gold. Separately, the federal government and the Reconstruction Finance Corporation, as creditors of the Iron Mountain Railway, intervened in a case brought by the Missouri Pacific Railroad for additional payment on Iron Mountain bonds. In both cases the district and appeal courts upheld the Gold Clause Resolution and denied additional payment. The defeated parties petitioned the Supreme Court for certiorari.

Nortz v. United States 294 U.S. 317 (1935): The owner of $106,300 in federal gold certificates surrendered them as required by Executive Order 6102, receiving only their face value in currency. He sued in the United States Court of Claims for an additional $64,000 representing the loss of the dollar against gold. That court submitted three certified questions to the Supreme Court, the first of which asked whether the plaintiff could demand the value of gold given that he had no right to possess the gold itself.

Perry v. United States 294 U.S. 330 (1935): The owner of a $10,000 Liberty Bond sued in the Court of Claims for an additional $7,000 representing the dollar's devaluation. Again, the Court of Claims submitted a question of whether it could consider a claim beyond the face value of the bond.

== Ruling ==
While the Roosevelt administration waited for the Court to return its judgment, contingency plans were made for an unfavorable ruling. Roosevelt drew up executive orders to close all stock exchanges and prepared a radio address to the public. "If the policy of the government ... is to be irrevocably fixed by decisions of the Supreme Court", he wrote, then "the people would have ceased to be their own rulers". Weighing the possibility of a constitutional crisis against the prospect of economic and political instability, he wrote that "legislative and executive officers of the Government must look beyond the narrow letter" of the matter.

Ideas floated about the White House to withdraw the right to sue the government to enforce gold clauses. Attorney General Homer Cummings opined the court should be immediately packed to ensure a favorable ruling. Roosevelt directed Treasury Secretary Henry Morgenthau to step back from regulating exchange and interest rates to provoke a public outcry for federal action, but Morgenthau refused.

All three cases were announced on February 18, 1935, each in favor of the government's position by a 5–4 majority. Chief Justice Charles Evans Hughes wrote the opinion for each case, finding the government's power to regulate money a plenary power. Only in the Perry case the Court reached the question of the Gold Clause Resolution's constitutionality. It concluded that Congress acted unconstitutionally in voiding the government's prior obligations but not in restricting transactions in gold. As a result, it held that the bond holder had no cause of action because, in receiving currency that he could lawfully possess rather than gold coin which he could not, he had suffered no monetary loss.

Justice James Clark McReynolds wrote the dissenting opinion. He protested that gold clauses were binding contracts, and that allowing the administration's policies to stand would permanently damage faith in the government to uphold its own contracts and those of private parties. McReynolds distinguished the cases at hand from the Legal Tender Cases, arguing that in the earlier cases the government sought to continue operating until it could meet its obligations, while the Roosevelt administration apparently sought to nullify them.

== Subsequent events ==
Congress responded to the ambiguous Perry ruling with an additional resolution (Pub. Res. 74–63) that provided sovereign immunity of the federal government against claims for damage resulting from the devaluation of currency or other federal obligations. The future of gold as a basis for money remained unsettled for nearly the entire Roosevelt presidency. In 1944, the Allies of World War II developed the Bretton Woods system that pegged the dollar to gold and other currencies to the dollar. This system continued until 1971 when President Richard Nixon, in what came to be known as the "Nixon Shock", announced that the United States would no longer convert dollars to gold at a fixed value even for foreign exchange purposes, thus abandoning the gold standard. As part of the subsequent reforms to Bretton Woods institutions, President Gerald Ford signed an act that terminated legal prohibitions on private gold transactions as of December 31, 1974.

The Gold Clause Resolution was amended in 1977 to again permit enforcement of gold clauses in private obligations issued after the date of the amendment. This amendment has been held to apply even to lease contracts that originated earlier and were transferred; however, in cases involving railroad bonds that spanned the entire gold ownership ban, courts have rejected the argument that the amendment reactivated the obligation to pay in gold, on the grounds that bonds are "issued" only to their original holders. In 1986, the federal government introduced the American Gold Eagle coin series, the first gold money produced by the United States since the Great Depression. These coins are legal tender at their face value, but the Mint offers them only as collectibles at their much higher bullion value—not as a form of payment by the government.
