= Douglas v. Cunningham =

- Supreme Court of the United States

Argued January 18, 1935 Decided February 4, 1935
- Full case name: Douglas v. Cunningham
- Citations: 294 U.S. 207 (more) 55 S. Ct. 365; 79 L. Ed. 862; 24 U.S.P.Q. 153

Case history
- Prior: Cunningham v. Douglas, 72 F.2d 536 (1st Cir. 1934); cert. granted, 293 U.S. 551 (1934).

Holding
- The statute allowed an award of $5,000 instead of a copyright infringement damages calculation based on the newspaper's circulation.

Court membership
- Chief Justice Charles E. Hughes Associate Justices Willis Van Devanter · James C. McReynolds; Louis Brandeis · George Sutherland; Pierce Butler · Harlan F. Stone; Owen Roberts · Benjamin N. Cardozo

Case opinion
- Majority: Roberts, joined by a unanimous court

Laws applied
- Copyright Act of 1909

Douglas v. Cunningham, 294 U.S. 207 (1935), was a United States Supreme Court case in which the Court held the Copyright Act of 1909 allowed an award of $5,000 instead of a copyright infringement damages calculation based on the newspaper's circulation.

== Background ==
Douglas wrote an original story which was accepted, copyrighted, and published by The American Mercury. The rights in the story under the copyright were assigned to Douglas. Thereafter, Cunningham wrote for the Post Publishing Company, and the latter published in some 384,000 copies of a Sunday edition of The Boston Post, an article which was a clear appropriation of Douglas's story.

Douglas sued in equity in the United States District Court for the District of Massachusetts, charging copyright infringement, praying an injunction, an award of profits and damages, or, "in lieu of actual damages or profits, such damages as to this Court shall appear to be just and proper within the provisions of the Act of Congress in such cases made and provided."

Testimony was presented with respect to the value of the story, but, at the close of the trial, the petitioners admitted inability to prove actual damages. The Publishing Company acted innocently in accepting the article from Cunningham, and the latter testified that he had procured the material for its from an acquaintance, believed the facts related to him were actual happenings, and was ignorant of Douglas' production. The trial judge ruled that no actual damage had been shown, but, in lieu thereof, granted the petitioners $5,000 and a counsel fee. Upon appeal, the Circuit Court of Appeals sustained an assignment of error which asserted the judge had abused his discretion in making the award, reversed the decree, and set the damages at $250.
