= List of United States Supreme Court cases, volume 294 =

Supreme Court of the United States
- Interactive map of Supreme Court of the United States
- 38°53′26″N 77°00′16″W
- Established: March 4, 1789; 236 years ago
- Location: Washington, D.C.
- Coordinates: 38°53′26″N 77°00′16″W
- Composition method: Presidential nomination with Senate confirmation
- Authorised by: Constitution of the United States, Art. III, § 1
- Judge term length: life tenure, subject to impeachment and removal
- Number of positions: 9 (by statute)
- Website: supremecourt.gov

This is a list of cases reported in volume 294 of United States Reports, decided by the Supreme Court of the United States in 1935.

== Justices of the Supreme Court at the time of volume 294 U.S. ==
The Supreme Court is established by Article III, Section 1 of the Constitution of the United States, which says: "The judicial Power of the United States, shall be vested in one supreme Court . . .". The size of the Court is not specified; the Constitution leaves it to Congress to set the number of justices. Under the Judiciary Act of 1789 Congress originally fixed the number of justices at six (one chief justice and five associate justices). Since 1789 Congress has varied the size of the Court from six to seven, nine, ten, and back to nine justices (always including one chief justice).

When the cases in volume 294 were decided the Court comprised the following nine members:

Portrait	Justice	Office	Home State	Succeeded	Date confirmed by the Senate (Vote)	Tenure on Supreme Court
	Charles Evans Hughes	Chief Justice	New York	William Howard Taft	February 13, 1930 (52–26)	February 24, 1930 – June 30, 1941 (Retired)
	Willis Van Devanter	Associate Justice	Wyoming	Edward Douglass White (as Associate Justice)	December 15, 1910 (Acclamation)	January 3, 1911 – June 2, 1937 (Retired)
	James Clark McReynolds	Associate Justice	Tennessee	Horace Harmon Lurton	August 29, 1914 (44–6)	October 12, 1914 – January 31, 1941 (Retired)
	Louis Brandeis	Associate Justice	Massachusetts	Joseph Rucker Lamar	June 1, 1916 (47–22)	June 5, 1916 – February 13, 1939 (Retired)
	George Sutherland	Associate Justice	Utah	John Hessin Clarke	September 5, 1922 (Acclamation)	October 2, 1922 – January 17, 1938 (Retired)
	Pierce Butler	Associate Justice	Minnesota	William R. Day	December 21, 1922 (61–8)	January 2, 1923 – November 16, 1939 (Died)
	Harlan F. Stone	Associate Justice	New York	Joseph McKenna	February 5, 1925 (71–6)	March 2, 1925 – July 2, 1941 (Continued as chief justice)
	Owen Roberts	Associate Justice	Pennsylvania	Edward Terry Sanford	May 20, 1930 (Acclamation)	June 2, 1930 – July 31, 1945 (Retired)
	Benjamin N. Cardozo	Associate Justice	New York	Oliver Wendell Holmes Jr.	February 24, 1932 (Acclamation)	March 14, 1932 – July 9, 1938 (Died)

== Notable Cases in 294 U.S. ==
=== Jurney v. MacCracken ===
In Jurney v. MacCracken, 294 U.S. 125 (1935), the Supreme Court held that Congress has an implicit power to find a person in contempt of Congress.

=== Gold Clause cases ===
The Gold Clause Cases (Norman v. Baltimore and Ohio Railroad Company, with United States v. Bankers' Trust Company, 294 U.S. 240 (1935); Nortz v. United States 294 U.S. 317 (1935); and Perry v. United States, 294 U.S. 330 (1935)) were a series of matters in which the Supreme Court narrowly upheld restrictions on the ownership of gold implemented by the administration of U.S. President Franklin D. Roosevelt in response to the Great Depression.

=== Baldwin v. G.A.F. Seelig, Inc. ===
In Baldwin v. G.A.F. Seelig, Inc., 294 U.S. 511 (1935), the Supreme Court held that a state may not regulate intrastate prices by prohibiting the importation of less expensive goods in interstate commerce. It established the principle that one state, in its dealings with another, cannot place itself in economic isolation.

=== Scottsboro Boys cases ===
The notorious Scottsboro Boys cases (Norris v. Alabama, 294 U.S. 587 (1935); and Patterson v. Alabama, 294 U.S. 600 (1935)) arose from charges against nine African American teenagers and young men, ages 13 to 20, accused in Alabama of raping two white women in 1931. The landmark set of legal cases from this incident dealt with racism and the right to a fair trial. The cases included a lynch mob before the suspects had been indicted, all-white juries, rushed trials, death sentences, and disruptive mobs. It is commonly cited as an example of a legal injustice in the United States legal system. On appeal the Supreme Court ruled that African Americans had to be included on juries, and ordered retrials of the young men.

== Federal court system ==
Under the Judiciary Act of 1789 the federal court structure at the time comprised District Courts, which had general trial jurisdiction; Circuit Courts, which had mixed trial and appellate (from the US District Courts) jurisdiction; and the United States Supreme Court, which had appellate jurisdiction over the federal District and Circuit courts—and for certain issues over state courts. The Supreme Court also had limited original jurisdiction (i.e., in which cases could be filed directly with the Supreme Court without first having been heard by a lower federal or state court). There were one or more federal District Courts and/or Circuit Courts in each state, territory, or other geographical region.

The Judiciary Act of 1891 created the United States Courts of Appeals and reassigned the jurisdiction of most routine appeals from the district and circuit courts to these appellate courts. The Act created nine new courts that were originally known as the "United States Circuit Courts of Appeals." The new courts had jurisdiction over most appeals of lower court decisions. The Supreme Court could review either legal issues that a court of appeals certified or decisions of court of appeals by writ of certiorari. On January 1, 1912, the effective date of the Judicial Code of 1911, the old Circuit Courts were abolished, with their remaining trial court jurisdiction transferred to the U.S. District Courts.

== List of cases in volume 294 U.S. ==
Case name	Citation	Opinion of the Court	Vote	Concurring opinion or statement	Dissenting opinion or statement	Procedural jurisdiction	Result
Smith v. Snow	294 U.S. 1 (1935)	Stone	9–0	none	none	certiorari to the United States Court of Appeals for the Eighth Circuit (8th Cir.)	judgment reversed
Waxham v. Smith	294 U.S. 20 (1935)	Stone	9–0	none	none	certiorari to the United States Court of Appeals for the Ninth Circuit (9th Cir.)	judgment affirmed
McCrea v. United States	294 U.S. 23 (1935)	Stone	9–0	none	none	certiorari to the United States Court of Appeals for the Second Circuit (2d Cir.)	judgment affirmed
Central Vermont Transportation Company v. Durning, Collector of Customs	294 U.S. 33 (1935)	Stone	9–0	none	none	certiorari to the United States Court of Appeals for the Second Circuit (2d Cir.)	judgment affirmed
Keystone Driller Company v. Northwestern Engineering Corporation	294 U.S. 42 (1935)	Roberts	9–0	none	none	certiorari to the United States Court of Appeals for the Seventh Circuit (7th Cir.)	judgments affirmed
United States ex rel. Chicago and Great Western Railroad Company v. Interstate Commerce Commission	294 U.S. 50 (1935)	Roberts	9–0	none	none	certiorari to the United States Court of Appeals for the District of Columbia (D.C. Cir.)	judgment affirmed
Western Ohio Gas Company v. Public Utility Commission of Ohio I	294 U.S. 63 (1935)	Cardozo	9–0	Stone (opinion)	none	appeal from the Ohio Supreme Court (Ohio)	decree reversed, and cause remanded
Western Ohio Gas Company v. Public Utility Commission of Ohio II	294 U.S. 79 (1935)	Cardozo	9–0	none	none	appeal from the Ohio Supreme Court (Ohio)	decree reversed, and cause remanded
Detroit International Bridge Company v. Corporation Tax Appeal Board of Michigan	294 U.S. 83 (1935)	McReynolds	9–0	Stone and Cardozo (without opinions)	none	appeal from the Michigan Supreme Court (Mich.)	judgment affirmed
Fox v. Standard Oil Company of New Jersey	294 U.S. 87 (1935)	Cardozo	5–4	none	VanDevanter, McReynolds, Sutherland, and Butler (without opinions)	appeal from the United States District Court for the Southern District of West Virginia (S.D.W. Va.)	decree reversed, and cause remanded
Mooney v. Holohan	294 U.S. 103 (1935)	per curiam	9–0	none	none	United States Court of Appeals for the Ninth Circuit (9th Cir.)	leave to file for habeas corpus denied
Lerner v. First Wisconsin National Bank of Milwaukee	294 U.S. 116 (1935)	McReynolds	9–0	none	none	certiorari to the United States Court of Appeals for the Seventh Circuit (7th Cir.)	judgment affirmed (one case); judgment reversed (one case)
Wilber National Bank of Oneonta v. United States	294 U.S. 120 (1935)	McReynolds	9–0	none	none	certiorari to the United States Court of Appeals for the Second Circuit (2d Cir.)	judgment affirmed
Jurney v. MacCracken	294 U.S. 125 (1935)	Brandeis	8-0[a]	none	none	certiorari to the United States Court of Appeals for the District of Columbia (D.C. Cir.)	judgment reversed
Helvering, Commissioner of Internal Revenue v. Grinnell	294 U.S. 153 (1935)	Sutherland	9–0	none	none	certiorari to the United States Court of Appeals for the Second Circuit (2d Cir.)	judgment affirmed
Forrest v. Jack	294 U.S. 158 (1935)	Butler	9–0	none	none	certiorari to the United States Court of Appeals for the Tenth Circuit (10th Cir.)	judgment reversed
Seabury v. Green	294 U.S. 165 (1935)	Butler	9–0	none	none	certiorari to the Court of Common Pleas for Sumter County, South Carolina (Sumter Cnty. Com. Pl.)	judgment reversed
Wiloil Corporation v. Pennsylvania	294 U.S. 169 (1935)	Butler	9–0	none	none	appeal from the Pennsylvania Supreme Court (Pa.)	judgment affirmed
Pennsylvania v. Williams	294 U.S. 176 (1935)	Stone	9–0	none	none	certiorari to the United States Court of Appeals for the Third Circuit (3d Cir.)	judgment reversed
Gordon, Secretary of Banking of Pennsylvania v. Ominsky	294 U.S. 186 (1935)	Stone	9–0	none	none	certiorari to the United States Court of Appeals for the Third Circuit (3d Cir.)	judgment reversed
Penn Central Casualty Company v. Pennsylvania ex rel. Schnader, Attorney General	294 U.S. 189 (1935)	Stone	9–0	none	none	certiorari to the Pennsylvania Supreme Court (Pa.)	judgment reversed
Domenech, Treasurer of Puerto Rico v. National City Bank of New York	294 U.S. 199 (1935)	Roberts	9–0	none	none	certiorari to the United States Court of Appeals for the First Circuit (1st Cir.)	judgment affirmed, and cause remanded
Douglas v. Cunningham	294 U.S. 207 (1935)	Roberts	9–0	none	none	certiorari to the United States Court of Appeals for the First Circuit (1st Cir.)	judgment reversed
Clark v. Williard	294 U.S. 211 (1935)	Cardozo	9–0	none	none	certiorari to the Montana Supreme Court (Mont.)	decree affirmed
Jennings v. United States Fidelity and Guarantee Company	294 U.S. 216 (1935)	Cardozo	9–0	none	none	certiorari to the United States Court of Appeals for the Seventh Circuit (7th Cir.)	decree reversed, and cause remanded
Old Company's Lehigh, Inc. v. Meeker	294 U.S. 227 (1935)	Cardozo	9–0	none	none	certiorari to the United States Court of Appeals for the Second Circuit (2d Cir.)	decree affirmed
Adams v. Champion	294 U.S. 231 (1935)	Cardozo	9–0	none	none	certiorari to the United States Court of Appeals for the Seventh Circuit (7th Cir.)	decree reversed, and cause remanded
Norman v. Baltimore and Ohio Railroad Company and United States v. Bankers' Trust Company	294 U.S. 240 (1935)	Hughes	5–4	none	McReynolds, VanDevanter, Sutherland, and Butler (see McReynolds's dissenting opinion in Perry v. United States, below)	certiorari to the New York Supreme Court (N.Y. Sup. Ct.); certiorari to the United States Court of Appeals for the Eighth Circuit (8th Cir.)	judgment affirmed (one case); decrees affirmed (two cases)
Nortz v. United States	294 U.S. 317 (1935)	Hughes	5–4	none	McReynolds, VanDevanter, Sutherland, and Butler (see McReynolds's dissenting opinion in Perry v. United States, below)	certified question from the United States Court of Claims (Ct. Cl.)	certified question answered
Perry v. United States	294 U.S. 330 (1935)	Hughes	5–4	Stone (opinion)	McReynolds (opinion; joined by VanDevanter, Sutherland, and Butler)	certified question from the United States Court of Claims (Ct. Cl.)	certified question answered
McCrea v. United States	294 U.S. 382 (1935)	Stone	9–0	none	none	certiorari to the United States Court of Appeals for the Second Circuit (2d Cir.)	re-argument denied
Cooney, Governor of Montana v. Mountain States Telephone and Telegraph Company	294 U.S. 384 (1935)	Hughes	9–0	none	none	appeal from the United States District Court for the District of Montana (D. Mont.)	decree affirmed
Aktieselskabet Cuzco v. The Sucarseco	294 U.S. 394 (1935)	Hughes	9–0	none	none	certiorari to the United States Court of Appeals for the Second Circuit (2d Cir.)	decree affirmed
Nashville, Chattanooga and St. Louis Railway Company v. Walters	294 U.S. 405 (1935)	Brandeis	6-2[a]	none	Stone and Cardozo (joint short statement)	appeal from the Tennessee Supreme Court (Tenn.)	judgment reversed, and cause remanded
Miller v. United States	294 U.S. 435 (1935)	Sutherland	9–0	none	none	certiorari to the United States Court of Appeals for the Fifth Circuit (5th Cir.)	judgment affirmed
Manufacturers' Financial Company v. McKey	294 U.S. 442 (1935)	Sutherland	9–0	none	none	certiorari to the United States Court of Appeals for the Seventh Circuit (7th Cir.)	judgment reversed
Schoenamsgruber v. Hamburg America Line	294 U.S. 454 (1935)	Butler	9–0	none	none	certiorari to the United States Court of Appeals for the Ninth Circuit (9th Cir.)	judgment affirmed
Great Northern Railroad Company v. Sullivan	294 U.S. 458 (1935)	Butler	9–0	none	none	certiorari to the United States Court of Appeals for the Eighth Circuit (8th Cir.)	judgment reversed
Paramount Publix Corporation v. American Tri-Ergon Corporation	294 U.S. 464 (1935)	Stone	8-0[b]	none	none	certiorari to the United States Court of Appeals for the Second Circuit (2d Cir.)	judgment reversed
Altoona Publix Theatres, Inc. v. American Tri-Ergon Corporation	294 U.S. 477 (1935)	Stone	8-0[b]	none	none	certiorari to the United States Court of Appeals for the Third Circuit (3d Cir.)	judgment reversed
The Ansaldo San Giorgio I v. Rheinstrom Brothers Company	294 U.S. 494 (1935)	Roberts	9–0	none	none	certiorari to the United States Court of Appeals for the Second Circuit (2d Cir.)	judgment affirmed
United States v. Chicago, Milwaukee, St. Paul and Pacific Railroad Company	294 U.S. 499 (1935)	Cardozo	9–0	none	none	appeal from the United States District Court for the Northern District of Illinois (N.D. Ill.)	decree affirmed
Baldwin v. G.A.F. Seelig, Inc.	294 U.S. 511 (1935)	Cardozo	9–0	none	none	appeal from the United States District Court for the Southern District of New York (S.D.N.Y.)	decree affirmed (one case); decree reversed, and cause remanded (one case)
Swinson v. Chicago, St. Paul, Minneapolis and Omaha Railway Company	294 U.S. 529 (1935)	Brandeis	9–0	none	none	certiorari to the United States Court of Appeals for the Eighth Circuit (8th Cir.)	judgment reversed
Alaska Packers Association v. Industrial Accident Commission of California	294 U.S. 532 (1935)	Stone	9–0	none	none	appeal from the California Supreme Court (Cal.)	judgment affirmed
Stewart Dry Goods Company v. Lewis	294 U.S. 550 (1935)	Roberts	6–3	none	Cardozo (opinion; joined by Brandeis and Stone)	appeal from the United States District Court for the Western District of Kentucky (W.D. Ky.)	judgment reversed
Metropolitan Casualty Insurance Company v. Brownell	294 U.S. 580 (1935)	Stone	5–4	none	VanDevanter, McReynolds, Sutherland, and Butler (joint brief statement)	certiorari to the United States Court of Appeals for the Seventh Circuit (7th Cir.)	judgment affirmed
Norris v. Alabama	294 U.S. 587 (1935)	Hughes	8-0[a]	none	none	certiorari to the Alabama Supreme Court (Ala.)	judgment reversed, and cause remanded
Patterson v. Alabama	294 U.S. 600 (1935)	Hughes	8-0[a]	none	none	certiorari to the Alabama Supreme Court (Ala.)	judgment vacated
Semler v. Oregon Board of Dental Examiners	294 U.S. 608 (1935)	Hughes	9–0	none	none	appeal from the Oregon Supreme Court (Or.)	judgment affirmed
Panhandle Eastern Pipe Line Company v. Kansas Highway Commission	294 U.S. 613 (1935)	McReynolds	9–0	Stone and Cardozo (without opinions)	none	appeal from the Kansas Supreme Court (Kan.)	judgment reversed, and cause remanded
Henry L. Doherty and Company v. Goodman	294 U.S. 623 (1935)	McReynolds	9–0	none	none	appeal from the Iowa Supreme Court (Iowa)	judgment affirmed
Broderick, Superintendent of Banks of New York v. Rosner	294 U.S. 629 (1935)	Brandeis	8–1	none	Cardozo (without opinion)	appeal from the New Jersey Court of Errors and Appeals (N.J.)	judgment reversed
Continental Illinois National Bank and Trust Company v. Chicago, Rock Island and Pacific Railroad Company	294 U.S. 648 (1935)	Sutherland	8-0[b]	none	none	certiorari to the United States Court of Appeals for the Seventh Circuit (7th Cir.)	decree affirmed
Helvering, Commissioner of Internal Revenue v. Inter-Mountain Life Insurance Company	294 U.S. 686 (1935)	Butler	9–0	none	none	certiorari to the United States Court of Appeals for the Tenth Circuit (10th Cir.)	judgment reversed

[a] McReynolds took no part in the case
[b] Brandeis took no part in the case
