= Gold clause =

Contractual clause regarding payment

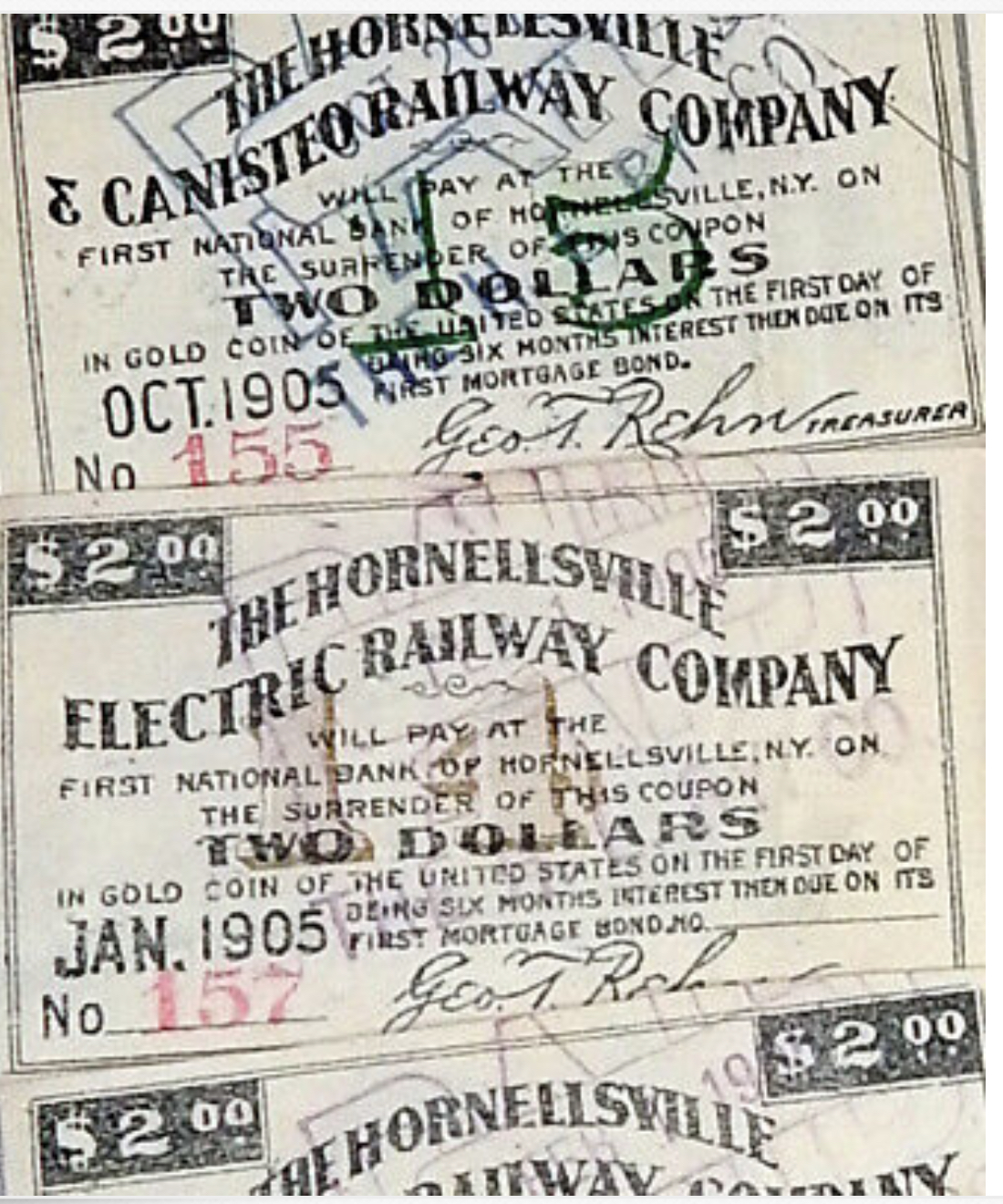
Bond coupons that promise to "pay in gold coin"

Gold clauses in contracts allow a creditor the option to receive payment in gold or gold equivalent. A gold clause may prove valuable to the creditor in long term contracts, wherein questions may arise as to whether a currency in use at the time the contract was entered into would still have the same value when payment is due. Creditor concerns in respect to inflation, war, changes in government, and any other uncertainty about the future value of currency would be common reasons for adopting a gold clause within a contract.

== Overview ==
These clauses were common at the beginning of the 20th century. However, their use in the United States was invalidated by the Joint Resolution of June 5, 1933 (Pub. Res. 73–10) and the Gold Reserve Act of 1934. Congress later rendered gold clauses again enforceable for contracts issued after October 28, 1977, as codified in 31 U.S.C. § 5118(d)(2).

In 2008, the United States Court of Appeals for the Sixth Circuit affirmed the enforceability of such clauses in the decision 216 Jamaica Avenue, LLC vs S&R Playhouse Realty Co..

== See also ==
- Escalator clause
- Gold Clause Cases
