= Powell v. Alabama =

- Supreme Court of the United States

Argued October 10, 1932 Decided November 7, 1932
- Full case name: Ozie Powell, Willie Roberson, Andy Wright, and Olen Montgomery v. State of Alabama
- Citations: 287 U.S. 45 (more) 53 S. Ct. 55; 77 L. Ed. 158; 1932 U.S. LEXIS 5; 84 A.L.R. 527

Case history
- Prior: Defendants convicted, Jackson County, Alabama Circuit Court, April 8, 1931; affirmed in part, 141 So. 201 (Ala. 1932); rehearing denied, Supreme Court of Alabama, April 9, 1932; cert. granted, 286 U.S. 540 (1932).
- Subsequent: Supreme Court of Alabama reversed

Holding
- Under the Due Process Clause of the 14th Amendment, a state must inform illiterate defendants charged with a capital crime that they have a right to be represented by counsel and must appoint counsel for defendants who cannot afford to hire a lawyer and give counsel adequate time to prepare for trial.

Court membership
- Chief Justice Charles E. Hughes Associate Justices Willis Van Devanter · James C. McReynolds; Louis Brandeis · George Sutherland; Pierce Butler · Harlan F. Stone; Owen Roberts · Benjamin N. Cardozo

Case opinions
- Majority: Sutherland, joined by Hughes, Van Devanter, Brandeis, Stone, Roberts, Cardozo
- Dissent: Butler, joined by McReynolds

Laws applied
- U.S. Const. amends. VI, XIV

Powell v. Alabama, 287 U.S. 45 (1932), is a landmark United States Supreme Court decision in which the court reversed the convictions of nine young black teenagers for allegedly raping two white women on a freight train near Scottsboro, Alabama. The majority of the court reasoned that the right to retain and be represented by a lawyer was fundamental to a fair trial and that at least in some circumstances, the trial judge must inform a defendant of this right. In addition, if the defendant cannot afford a lawyer, the court must appoint one sufficiently far in advance of trial to permit the lawyer to prepare adequately for the trial.

Powell was the first time the court had reversed a state criminal conviction for a violation of a criminal procedural provision of the United States Bill of Rights. In effect, it held that the Fourteenth Amendment Due Process Clause included at least part of the right to counsel referred to in the Sixth Amendment, making that much of the Bill of Rights binding on the states. Before Powell, the court had reversed state criminal convictions only for racial discrimination in jury selection — a practice that violated the Equal Protection Clause of the Fourteenth Amendment. Powell has been praised by legal scholars for upholding the American adversarial system in respect to criminal law since the system "relies upon attorneys to hold the state to its burden" which is harder to maintain if the defendants have ineffective assistance of counsel.

== Background of the case ==
In March 1931, nine black teenagers—Charlie Weems, Ozie Powell, Clarence Norris, Olen Montgomery, Willie Roberson, Haywood Patterson, Andrew (Andy) Wright, Leroy (Roy) Wright and Eugene Williams, later known as the Scottsboro Boys—were accused of raping two young white women, Ruby Bates and Victoria Price.

The group of black youth were on a freight train with seven white men and two women. A fight broke out, and all of the white men were thrown from the train. The women accused the black youth of rape, although one woman later retracted her claim. All the defendants, except for 13-year-old Roy Wright, were sentenced to death in a series of three one-day trials. The defendants, who were under military guard to protect them from any mob violence, were not told they could hire lawyers or even contact their families. They had no access to a lawyer until shortly before trial, leaving little or no time to plan the defense. They appealed their convictions on the grounds that the group was not provided adequate legal counsel. The Alabama Supreme Court ruled 7-2 that the trial was fair. Chief Justice John C. Anderson wrote a strongly worded dissenting opinion. The defendants appealed the Alabama Supreme Court's ruling to the U.S. Supreme Court.

== Supreme Court opinion ==
The Supreme Court reversed and remanded, holding that due process had been violated. Writing for himself and six other Justices, Justice Sutherland explained the court's ruling as follows:

In the light of the ... ignorance and illiteracy of the defendants, their youth, the circumstances of public hostility, the imprisonment and the close surveillance of the defendants by the military forces, the fact that their friends and families were all in other states and communication with them necessarily difficult, and above all that they stood in deadly peril of their lives—we think the failure of the trial court to give them reasonable time and opportunity to secure counsel was a clear denial of due process. But passing that, and assuming their inability, even if opportunity had been given, to employ counsel, ... under the circumstances just stated, the necessity of counsel was so vital and imperative that the failure of the trial court to make an effective appointment of counsel was likewise a denial of due process within the meaning of the Fourteenth Amendment.

The court's holding was quite limited. Justice Sutherland cautioned that

Whether this would be so in other criminal prosecutions, or under other circumstances, we need not determine. All that it is necessary now to decide, as we do decide, is that in a capital case, where the defendant is unable to employ counsel, and is incapable adequately of making his own defense because of ignorance, feeble-mindedness, illiteracy, or the like, it is the duty of the court, whether requested or not, to assign counsel for him as a necessary requisite of due process of law; and that duty is not discharged by an assignment at such a time or under such circumstances as to preclude the giving of effective aid in the preparation and trial of the case. ... In a case such as this, whatever may be the rule in other cases, the right to have counsel appointed, when necessary, is a logical corollary from the constitutional right to be heard by counsel.

== Subsequent jurisprudence ==
Whether Powell v. Alabama applied to non-capital cases sparked heated debate. Betts v. Brady initially decided that, unless there were special circumstances such as illiteracy or a complicated trial, there was no need for a court-appointed attorney. That decision was ultimately overturned in Gideon v. Wainwright, which established the right of an indigent felony defendant to be provided a trial attorney. Later Supreme Court cases have considered how early in the criminal process this right attaches, whether it applies to misdemeanors, and whether it applies to appeals from convictions.

== See also ==
- List of United States Supreme Court cases, volume 287
- Continuance
- Norris v. Alabama (1935)
