= Norris v. Alabama =

- Supreme Court of the United States

Argued February 15, 18, 1935 Decided April 1, 1935
- Full case name: Norris v. Alabama
- Citations: 294 U.S. 587 (more) 55 S. Ct. 579; 79 L. Ed. 1074

Holding
- Exclusion of blacks from a grand jury by which an African-American is indicted, or from the petit jury by which he is tried for the offense, resulting from systematic and arbitrary exclusion of blacks from the jury lists solely because of their race or color, is a denial of the equal protection under the Fourteenth Amendment.

Court membership
- Chief Justice Charles E. Hughes Associate Justices Willis Van Devanter · James C. McReynolds; Louis Brandeis · George Sutherland; Pierce Butler · Harlan F. Stone; Owen Roberts · Benjamin N. Cardozo

Case opinion
- Majority: Hughes, joined by Van Devanter, Brandeis, Sutherland, Butler, Stone, Roberts, Cardozo
- McReynolds took no part in the consideration or decision of the case.

Laws applied
- U.S. Const. amend. XIV

Norris v. Alabama, 294 U.S. 587 (1935), was one of the cases decided by the Supreme Court of the United States that arose out of the trial of the Scottsboro Boys, who were nine African-American teenagers falsely accused of raping two white women in 1931. The Scottsboro trial jury had no African-American members. Several cases were brought to the Supreme Court to debate the constitutionality of all-white juries. Norris v. Alabama centered around Clarence Norris, one of the Scottsboro Boys, and his claim that the jury selection had systematically excluded black members due to racial prejudice.

== Decision ==
On April 1, 1935, an 8–0 Supreme Court decision authored by Chief Justice Charles Evans Hughes reversed the conviction of Clarence Norris on the grounds that evidence proved that African-Americans were unlawfully excluded from the jury. The lack of dissent characterizes the shift of national opinion on the ideas of race within the criminal justice system. The Court's opinion states that though Alabama had no direct laws prohibiting African-American involvement in juries, its practices essentially accomplished this discrimination.

The Supreme Court held that the systematic exclusion of African Americans from jury service violated the Equal Protection Clause of the Fourteenth Amendment. The case was a significant advance in the Supreme Court's criminal procedure jurisprudence. Building on the existing precedent of Strauder v. West Virginia (1880) and Neal v. Delaware (1882), the Supreme Court addressed an Alabama statute that was facially neutral, but held that a criminal defendant could establish a prima facie (that is, accepted as true unless proven otherwise) claim of discrimination by showing that a substantial number of African Americans live in a community and that African Americans have been excluded from serving on juries. The prima facie evidence in this case was the disproportionality in the number of African-Americans who lived in the county compared to the number of African-Americans represented on juries.

== Clarence Norris ==
Clarence Norris, though sentenced to death twice, died of old age in the year 1989. He was paroled in 1943 and pardoned by Alabama Governor George Wallace in 1976. He spent 15 years in prison and 30 years as a fugitive running from his parole. During this period as a runaway, Norris worked in New York as a warehouse employee. He was forced to change his name upon arrival because the stigma of being a Scottsboro Boy was too difficult to live with. Also during his time in New York, Norris unsuccessfully fought for $10,000 in reparations for the injustices against him. Though each of the Scottsboro Boys but the youngest received the death penalty, none of them were actually executed. Clarence Norris was the last survivor out of the group of nine.

== Impact ==
The ultimate impact of the Norris v. Alabama case is its direct effect on how racial discrimination is viewed constitutionally. Prior to this judgment, all-white juries were commonplace and not considered unconstitutional. This Supreme Court opinion made racial diversity and proportionality an expectation in the courtroom. It relied upon the principles of the Fourteenth Amendment to the Constitution, the Equal Protection Clause, which states that the law should protect every American in an equal manner.
