= Scottsboro =

Scottsboro may refer to:

- Scottsboro, Alabama, United States
- Scottsboro, Georgia, United States
- The Scottsboro Boys, involved in a racially charged legal case that made it to the United States Supreme Court
- Scottsboro: A Novel, a 2008 novel by Ellen Feldman nominated for the Orange Prize for Fiction
- Scottsboro: An American Tragedy, a 2001 documentary about the above legal case
