= Nancy Cunard =

English writer, heiress and political activist (1896–1965)

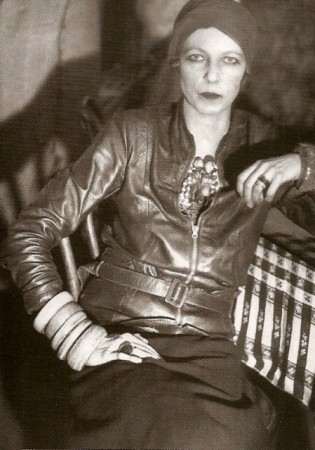
- Born: Nancy Clara Cunard; 10 March 1896; London, England
- Died: 17 March 1965 (aged 69); Paris, France
- Occupations: Writer; Political activist
- Spouse: Sydney Fairbairn (m. 1916; div. 1925)
- Relatives: Sir Bache Cunard (father); Maud Cunard (mother)
- Writing career
- Genre: Poetry

Nancy Clara Cunard (10 March 1896 – 17 March 1965) was a British writer, heiress and political activist. She was born into the British upper class, and devoted much of her life to fighting racism and fascism. She became a muse to some of the 20th century's most distinguished writers and artists, including Wyndham Lewis, Aldous Huxley, Tristan Tzara, Ezra Pound and Louis Aragon—who were among her lovers—as well as Ernest Hemingway, James Joyce, Constantin Brâncuși, Langston Hughes, Man Ray and William Carlos Williams. MI5 documents reveal that she was involved with Indian diplomat, orator, and statesman V. K. Krishna Menon.

In later years she suffered from mental illness, and her physical health deteriorated. When she died in the Hôpital Cochin, Paris, she weighed only 26 kilograms (57 pounds; 4 stone 1 pound).

== 1910s ==
Cunard's father was Sir Bache Cunard, an heir to the Cunard Line shipping businesses, interested in polo and fox hunting, and a baronet. Her mother was Maud Alice Burke, an American heiress, who adopted the first name Emerald and became a leading London society hostess. Nancy had been brought up on the family estate at Nevill Holt, Leicestershire. When her parents separated in 1911, she moved to London with her mother. Her education was at various boarding schools, including time in France and Germany.

In London, she spent a good deal of her childhood with her mother's long-time admirer, the novelist George Moore. It was even rumoured that Moore was her father, and although this has been largely dismissed, there is no question that he played an important role in her life while she was growing up. She would later write a memoir about her affection for "GM".

On 15 November 1916 she married Sydney Fairbairn, a cricketer and army officer who had been wounded at Gallipoli. After a honeymoon in Devon and Cornwall, they lived in London in a house given to them by Nancy's mother as a wedding present. Cunard's lover Peter Broughton-Adderley was killed in action in France less than a month before Armistice Day. Many who knew her claimed that she never fully recovered from Adderley's loss. Cunard and Fairbairn separated in 1919. At this time she was on the edge of the influential group The Coterie, associating in particular with Iris Tree.

She contributed to the periodical Wheels, edited by the Sitwells, for which she provided the title poem; it has been said that the venture was originally her project.

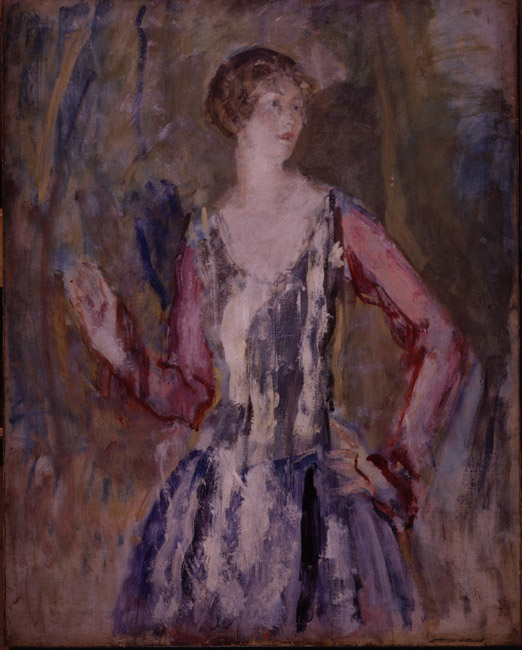
Nancy Cunard by Ambrose McEvoy

== Paris ==
Nancy Cunard moved to Paris in 1920. There, she became involved with literary Modernism, Surrealists and Dada. Much of her published poetry dates from this period. During her early years in Paris, she was close to Michael Arlen.

In 1920 she had a near-fatal hysterectomy, for reasons that are not entirely clear. She recovered, and was then able to lead an active sexual life without the fear of pregnancy.

A brief relationship with Aldous Huxley influenced several of his novels. She was the model for Myra Viveash in Antic Hay (1923) and for Lucy Tantamount in Point Counter Point (1928).

In Paris, Cunard spent much time with Eugene McCown, an American artist from the hard-drinking set whom she made her protégé. It has been suggested that she became dependent on alcohol at this time, and may have used other drugs.

Cunard divorced Fairbairn in 1925. In 1926, Cunard legally changed her name to 'Sidney George Cunard'.

In 1928, the year she founded her publishing company, Hours Press, she met Henry Crowder, with whom she lived until 1933.

== Personal style ==
Cunard's style, informed by her devotion to the artefacts of African culture, was startlingly unconventional. The large-scale jewellery she favoured, crafted of wood, bone and ivory, the natural materials used by native crafts people, was provocative and controversial. The bangles she wore on both arms snaking from wrist to elbow were considered outré adornments, which provoked media attention, visually compelling subject matter for photographers of the day. She was often photographed wearing her collection, those of African inspiration and neckpieces of wooden cubes, which paid homage to the concepts of Cubism.

At first considered the bohemian affectation of an eccentric heiress, the fashion world came to legitimize this style as avant garde, dubbing it the "barbaric look". Prestigious jewellery houses such as Boucheron created their own African-inspired cuff of gold beads. Boucheron, eschewing costly gemstones, incorporated into the finished creation green malachite and a striking purple mineral, purpurite, instead. It exhibited this high-end piece at the Exposition Coloniale in 1931.

== The Hours Press ==
In 1927, Cunard moved into a farmhouse in La Chapelle-Réanville, Normandy. It was there in 1928 that she set up the Hours Press. Previously the small press had been called Three Mountains Press and run by William Bird, an American journalist in Paris, who had published books by its editor from 1923, Ezra Pound, William Carlos Williams' The Great American Novel, Robert McAlmon and Ernest Hemingway's In Our Time. Cunard wanted to support experimental poetry and provide a higher-paying market for young writers. Her inherited wealth allowed her to take financial risks that other publishers could not. The Hours Press became known for its beautiful book designs and high-quality production.

It brought out the first separately published work of Samuel Beckett, a poem called Whoroscope (1930); Bob Brown's Words; and Pound's A Draft of XXX Cantos. Cunard published old friends such as George Moore, Norman Douglas, Richard Aldington and Arthur Symons, and brought out Henry-Music, a book of poems from various authors with music by Henry Crowder, two books by Laura Riding, the Collected Poems of John Rodker, poems by Roy Campbell, Harold Acton, Brian Howard and Walter Lowenfels. Wyn Henderson had taken over day-to-day operation of the press by 1931; in the same year it published its last book, The Revaluation of Obscenity by sexologist Havelock Ellis.

== Political activism ==
In 1928 (after a two-year affair with Louis Aragon) Cunard began a relationship with Henry Crowder, an African-American jazz musician who was working in Paris. In 1930, she published Henry Music, a compilation of compositions by Crowder accompanied by poems by Samuel Beckett, Henry Acton, Richard Aldington, and Walter Lowenfels she commissioned for the publication. She became an activist in matters concerning racial politics and civil rights in the US, and visited Harlem. In 1931, she published the pamphlet Black Man and White Ladyship, an attack on racist attitudes as exemplified by Cunard's mother, whom she quoted as saying: "Is it true that my daughter knows a Negro?"

She edited the massive Negro Anthology, collecting poetry, fiction, and nonfiction primarily by African-American writers, including Langston Hughes and Zora Neale Hurston. It included writing by George Padmore and Cunard's own account of the Scottsboro Boys case. Press attention to this project in May 1932, two years before it was published, led to Cunard's receiving anonymous threats and hate mail, some of which she published in the book, expressing regret that "[others] are obscene, so this portion of American culture cannot be made public."

She identified as an anarchist.

== Anti-fascism ==
In the mid-1930s Cunard took up the anti-fascist fight, writing about Mussolini's annexation of Ethiopia and the Spanish Civil War. She predicted, accurately, that the "events in Spain were a prelude to another world war". Her stories about the suffering of Spanish refugees became the basis for a fundraising appeal in the Manchester Guardian. Cunard herself helped deliver supplies and organize the relief effort, but poor health – caused in part by exhaustion and the conditions in the camps – forced her to return to Paris, where she stood on the streets collecting funds for the refugees. In the pages of Sylvia Pankhurst's The New Times and Ethiopia News, in a comment on how ingrained race and colonial prejudices were even among the Left, she suggested that had the Spanish Popular Front government engaged the good will of its colonial subjects, the fascist rebellion against the republic might have strangled where it first broke out – in Spanish Morocco.

In 1937 Cunard published a series of pamphlets of war poetry, including the work of W. H. Auden, Tristan Tzara and Pablo Neruda. Later in 1937, together with Auden and Stephen Spender, she distributed a questionnaire about the war to writers in Europe. The results were published by the Left Review as Authors Take Sides on the Spanish War.

The questionnaire to 200 writers asked the question "Are you for, or against, the legal government and people of Republican Spain? Are you for, or against, Franco and Fascism? For it is impossible any longer to take no side."

There were 147 answers, of which 126 supported the Republic, including Auden, Beckett and Rebecca West.

Five writers explicitly responded in favour of Franco: Evelyn Waugh, Edmund Blunden, Arthur Machen, Geoffrey Moss and Eleanor Smith.

Among 16 responses that Cunard, in her eventually published compendium, grouped under the sceptical heading "Neutral?" were H. G. Wells, Ezra Pound, T. S. Eliot and Vera Brittain.

The most famous response was not included: it was George Orwell's, and began:

Will you please stop sending me this bloody rubbish. This is the second or third time I have had it. I am not one of your fashionable pansies like Auden or Spender, I was six months in Spain, most of the time fighting, I have a bullet hole in me at present and I am not going to write blah about defending democracy or gallant little anybody....

Several other writers also declined to contribute, including Virginia Woolf, Bertrand Russell, E. M. Forster, and James Joyce.

During World War II, Cunard worked, to the point of physical exhaustion, as a translator in London on behalf of the French Resistance.

== Later life ==
After the war, Cunard gave up her home at Réanville and travelled extensively. In June 1948, she travelled from Trinidad to the United Kingdom aboard the HMT Empire Windrush. The voyage and the ship later became well known because the passengers included one of the first large groups of postwar West Indian immigrants to the United Kingdom.

In September 1948 she started renting a small house in the French village Lamothe-Fénelon, in the Dordogne Valley. In later years she suffered from mental illness and poor physical health, worsened by alcoholism, poverty, and self-destructive behaviour. She was committed to a mental hospital after a fight with London police. After her release, her health declined even further, and she weighed less than 60 pounds (27 kg) when she was found on the street in Paris and brought to the Hôpital Cochin, where she died two days later.

Her body was returned to England for cremation and the remains were sent to the Cimetière du Père-Lachaise in Paris. Her ashes rest in urn number 9016.

== Tributes ==
Constantin Brâncuși's La Jeune Fille Sophistiquée (Portrait de Nancy Cunard), a polished bronze on a carved marble base (1932), sold in May 2018 for US$71 million (with fees) at Christie's New York, setting a world record auction price for the artist.

According to an account of drafts of the poem "Nancy Cunard" by Mina Loy held in Yale University Library,

Drafts of Loy's poem about Nancy Cunard, her friend, fellow poet, and editor of The Hours Press, provide a window on her [Loy's] creative process. The final, published version of the poem ends with lines derived from this draft's beginning and its final lines are now the poem's centre:

The vermilion wall
receding as a sin
beyond your moonstone whiteness,
Your chiffon voice.

== Works ==
- Outlaws (1921), poems
- Sublunary (1923), poems
- Parallax (1925, Hogarth Press), poems
- Poems (Two) (1925, Aquila Press), poems
- Poems (1930)
- Black Man and White Ladyship (1931), polemic pamphlet
- Negro (1934), anthology of African literature and art, editor
- Authors Take Sides (1937), pamphlet, compiler
- Los poetas del mundo defienden al pueblo español (1937, Paris), co-editor with Pablo Neruda
- The White Man's Duty: An analysis of the colonial question in the light of the Atlantic Charter (with George Padmore) (1942)
- Poems for France, La France libre, London, 1944, and Poèmes à la France, Paris: Seghers, 1947
- Releve into Marquis (1944)
- Grand Man: Memories of Norman Douglas (1954)
- GM: Memories of George Moore (1956)
- These Were the Hours: Memories of My Hours Press, Réanville and Paris, 1928–1931 (1969), autobiography
- Poems of Nancy Cunard: from the Bodleian Library (2005), edited with an introduction by John Lucas.
- Selected Poems (2016), edited with an introduction by Sandeep Parmar.
