= La Chapelle-Réanville =

- Part of La Chapelle-Longueville
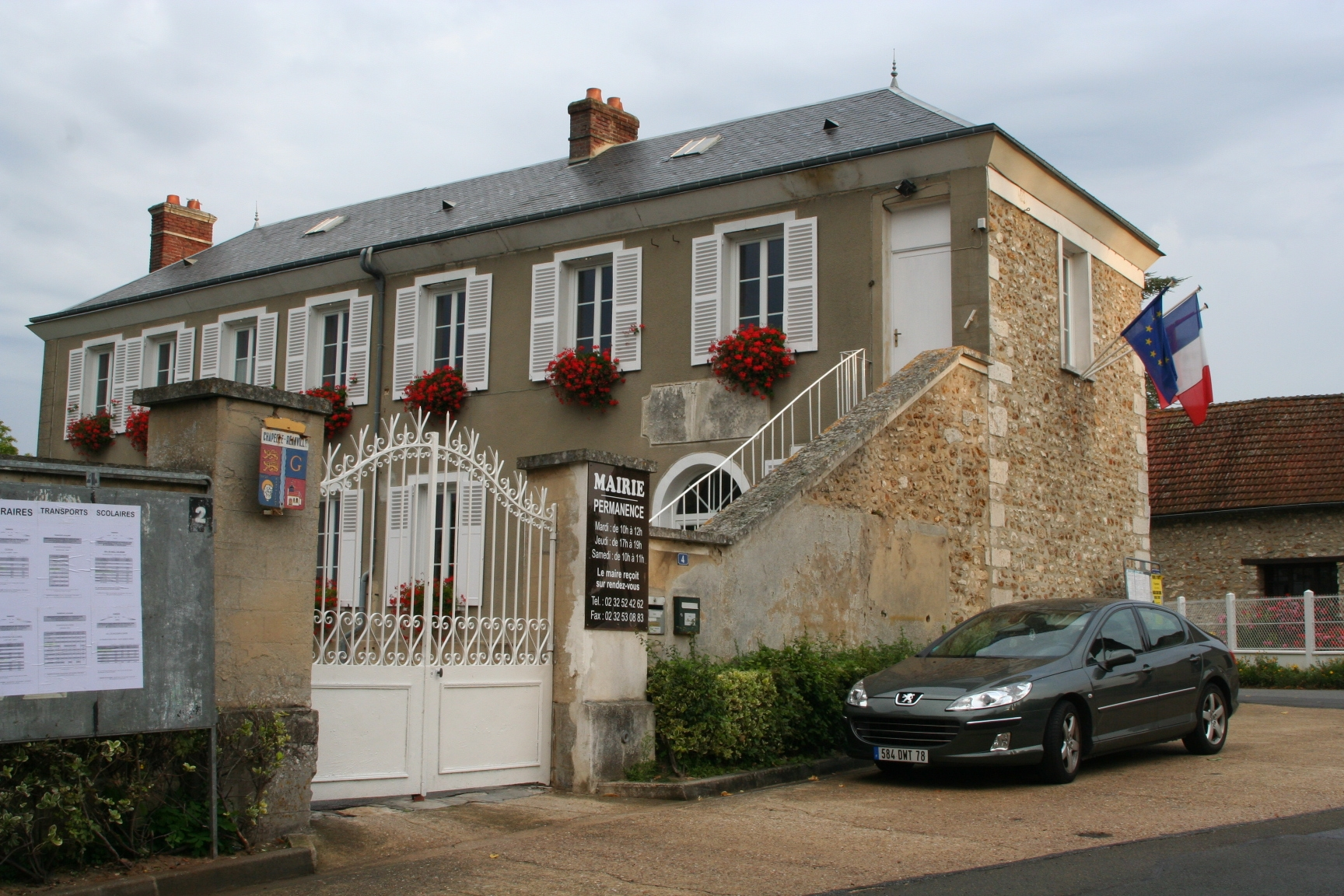
- Town hall

- Coat of arms
- Location of La Chapelle-Réanville
- Location within France Location within Normandy
- Coordinates: 49°05′46″N 1°22′41″E
- Country: France
- Region: Normandy
- Department: Eure
- Arrondissement: Les Andelys
- Canton: Pacy-sur-Eure
- Commune: La Chapelle-Longueville
- Area^{1}: 8.07 km^{2} (3.12 sq mi)
- Elevation: 125 m (410 ft)
- Highest elevation: 137 m (449 ft)
- Lowest elevation: 59 m (194 ft)
- Population (2018): 1,097
  - Density: 136/km^{2} (352/sq mi)
- Time zone: UTC+01:00 (CET)
  - Summer (DST): UTC+02:00 (CEST)
- Postal code: 27950
- ^{1} French Land Register data, which excludes lakes, ponds, glaciers > 1 km^{2} (0.386 sq mi or 247 acres) and river estuaries.

La Chapelle-Réanville (French pronunciation: [la ʃapɛl ʁeɑ̃vil]) is a former commune in the Eure department in northern France. It was formed in 1844 by the merger of the former communes La Chapelle-Génevray and Réanville. On 1 January 2017, it was merged into the new commune La Chapelle-Longueville.

== Population ==
Historical population

Year	Pop.	±% p.a.
1846	339	—
1872	301	−0.46%
1901	270	−0.37%
1926	209	−1.02%
1946	199	−0.24%
1962	185	−0.45%

Year	Pop.	±% p.a.
1968	179	−0.55%
1975	603	+18.95%
1982	1,030	+7.95%
1990	1,031	+0.01%
1999	1,019	−0.13%
2018	1,097	+0.39%

Source: EHESS and INSEE

Nancy Cunard, English heiress to the Cunard Line, activist and writer, moved into a small farmhouse, Le Puits Carré (The Four-Cornered Well), just outside the village in 1928. Soon after this Henry Crowder, American Jazz musician, came to stay with Cunard when she relocated her Hours Press to the farm's outbuildings. She removed the press to Paris in 1930 but continued to own the farmhouse with frequent visits. Looted by German soldiers in the Second World War while Cunard was in London, she sold the property after the liberation. Later the main house was destroyed by fire and the site remains abandoned.

== See also ==
- Communes of the Eure department
