= Scottsboro Boys Museum and Cultural Center =

Scottsboro Boys Museum

- Location within Alabama
- Established: 2010
- Location: Scottsboro, Alabama
- Coordinates: 34.67394°N 86.04129°W
- Type: Public
- Website: scottsboroboysmuseum.org

The Scottsboro Boys Museum is located at 428 West Willow Street in Scottsboro, Alabama, in the United States. Its focus is on the Scottsboro Boys case, which involved nine young African American men falsely accused in 1931 of raping two white women while hoboing aboard a freight train.

== Genesis of the museum ==
The museum was founded by Sheila Washington. In 1977, when she was 17, she found a paperback book about the Scottsboro Boys hidden under her parents' bed. Her stepfather forbade her from reading it, saying it was too traumatic for a young girl. She later obtained the book on her own, and the story haunted her. In 1978, her brother was killed in Kilby Prison, the same facility where the Scottsboro Boys were incarcerated decades earlier. She told herself, "One day, when I get older, I'm going to find a place and honor the Scottsboro Boys and put this book on a table and burn a candle in their memory".

Washington first raised the idea of a Scottsboro Boys museum in 2000 as part of a public discussion local officials had about created a historic walking trail in the area. She faced resistance from many in the Scottsboro area, who felt the incident was over and wanted to forget it. Even a former mayor of Scottsboro advised her not to try. (Note: Until 2010, the only acknowledgement of the Scottsboro Boys case was a historical marker at the courthouse, placed there in 2003.) Washington established the Scottsboro-Jackson County Multicultural Heritage Foundation to build community and financial support for the museum.

The museum opened on February 1, 2010.

== About the museum ==
The Scottsboro Boys Museum is located in the former Joyce Chapel United Methodist Church, a former African American church. The oldest surviving African American church in the county, the congregation dissolved in January 2009 and leased its building to the museum. The building is located near the railroad tracks that carried the train on which the Scottsboro Boys hoboed.

Shortly after the museum opened, the United Methodist Church put the building up for sale. The museum quickly raised $75,000 ($100,000 in 2025 dollars) to purchase the site —half from the Jackson County Commission (the county legislative body) and half from a foundation with ties to the family of Samuel Leibowitz (the white Jewish attorney who defended the Scottsboro Boys). (Note: The museum prominently recognizes the role of Leibowitz in the case.)

Major donors include the State of Alabama, the Jackson County Commission, the Ford Foundation, and the National Trust for Historic Preservation.

=== Collection and exhibits ===
Interior view of a portion of the museum

Much of the museum's initial collection was assembled by Washington herself, with later assistance from Black Heritage Council of the Alabama Historical Commission. Local historian Garry Morgan helped by securing the donation of some items and personally buying others at auction or online. Morgan created the initial exhibits.

Table used to serve breakfast to the nine defendants the morning after their arrests, March 26, 1931, in the Jackson County Jail in Scottsboro.

According to Sarah Stahl, a spokesperson for the Mountain Lakes Chamber of Commerce, the museum not only documents the Scottsboro Boys case but also shows how the trial helped to initiate the modern American civil rights movement. Part of the museum's collection includes physical objects, such as the metal table used by the Scottsboro Boys in their cell at the Jackson County Jail, a chair used by a member of the jury during the trial, and stamps sold by International Labor Defense to raise money for the defense, (Note: International Labor Defense (ILD) was an organization which raised money for the legal defense work involving American Communists, civil rights cases, and certain cause célèbre cases. It was the American section of the Comintern's International Red Aid network. ILD played a major role in raising funds in the Scottsboro case and supplied the defendants with their first attorneys.) photographs of the trial, and original newspaper articles about the case. The museum also contains a number of scrapbooks put together by local residents, nearly all of which had never been examined by historians before. The museum's major exhibit upon opening was a timeline of the events of the case from until the death of the last Scottsboro Boy in 1989.

Since its founding, Sheila Washington served as the museum's director and tour guide. She died of a heart attack on January 29, 2021.

The museum, which originally offered visiting hours twice a week, drew an estimated 1,200 visitors its first year, about two-thirds of them from northern states and two-thirds of them white. The museum has since expanded its hours and is now open five days a week. It is one of eight locations in Alabama on the United States National Civil Rights Trail.

=== Improvements ===
In the years since its opening, the Scottsboro Boys Museum has worked to create multimedia exhibits and programming with several prominent scholars of the case as well as colleges and universities, including the University of Alabama, Alabama A&M University, Auburn University, and Tuskegee University.

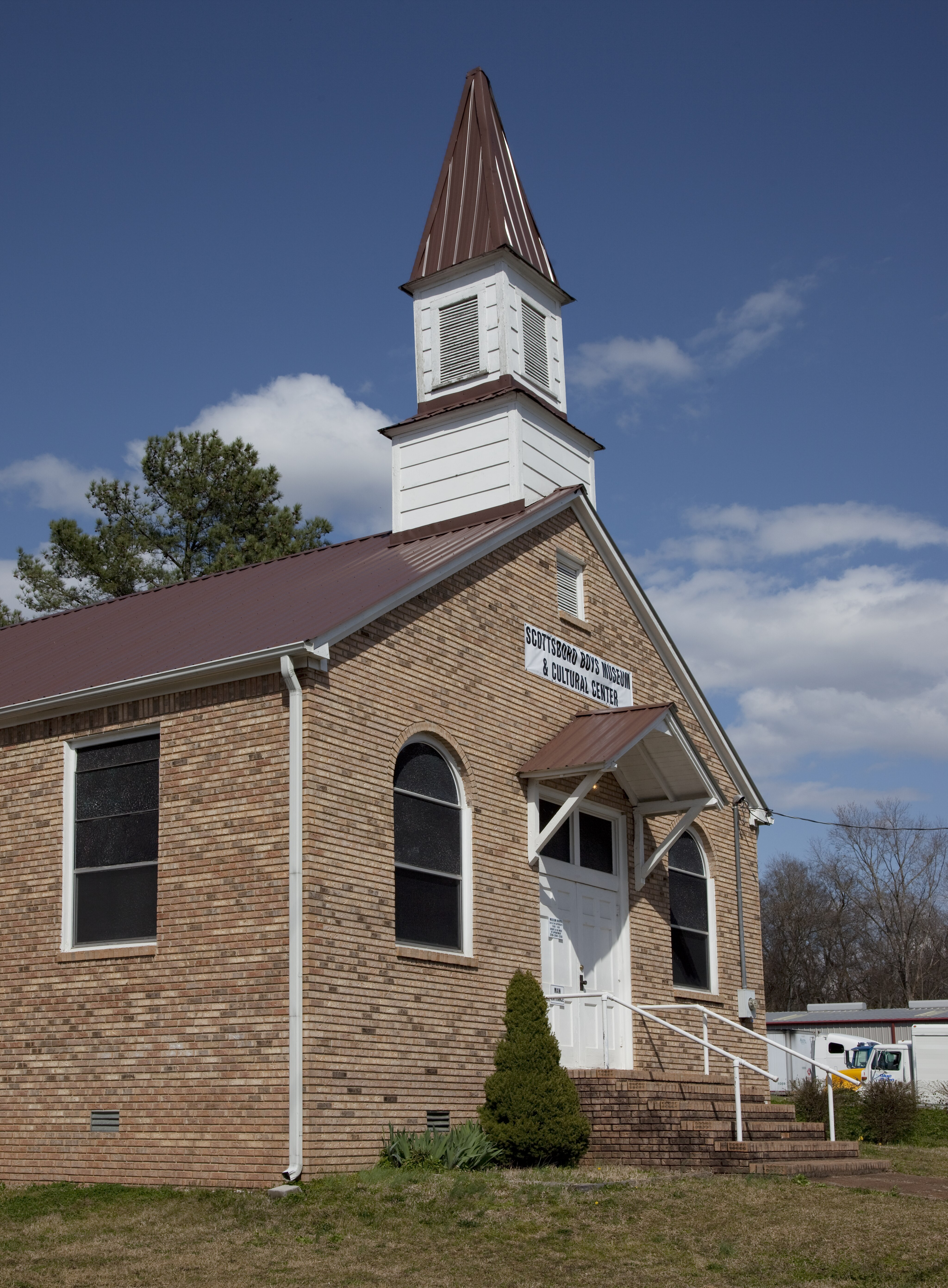
Scottsboro Boys Museum in March 2010

The museum embarked on a $100,000 fundraising effort to celebrate its 10th anniversary. The museum intended to use the money to pay for the courtroom recreation, add technological improvements to the museum, automate more exhibits, and add new exhibits showing how the case inspired a wide range of civil rights events. (Note: One future exhibit will document how the case inspired author Harper Lee to write To Kill A Mockingbird.) Alabama State Senator Steve Livingston donated $62,500 to the renovation project, while a GoFundMe account had raised just over $4,700 as of February 25, 2021.
