= James Edwin Horton =

American judge

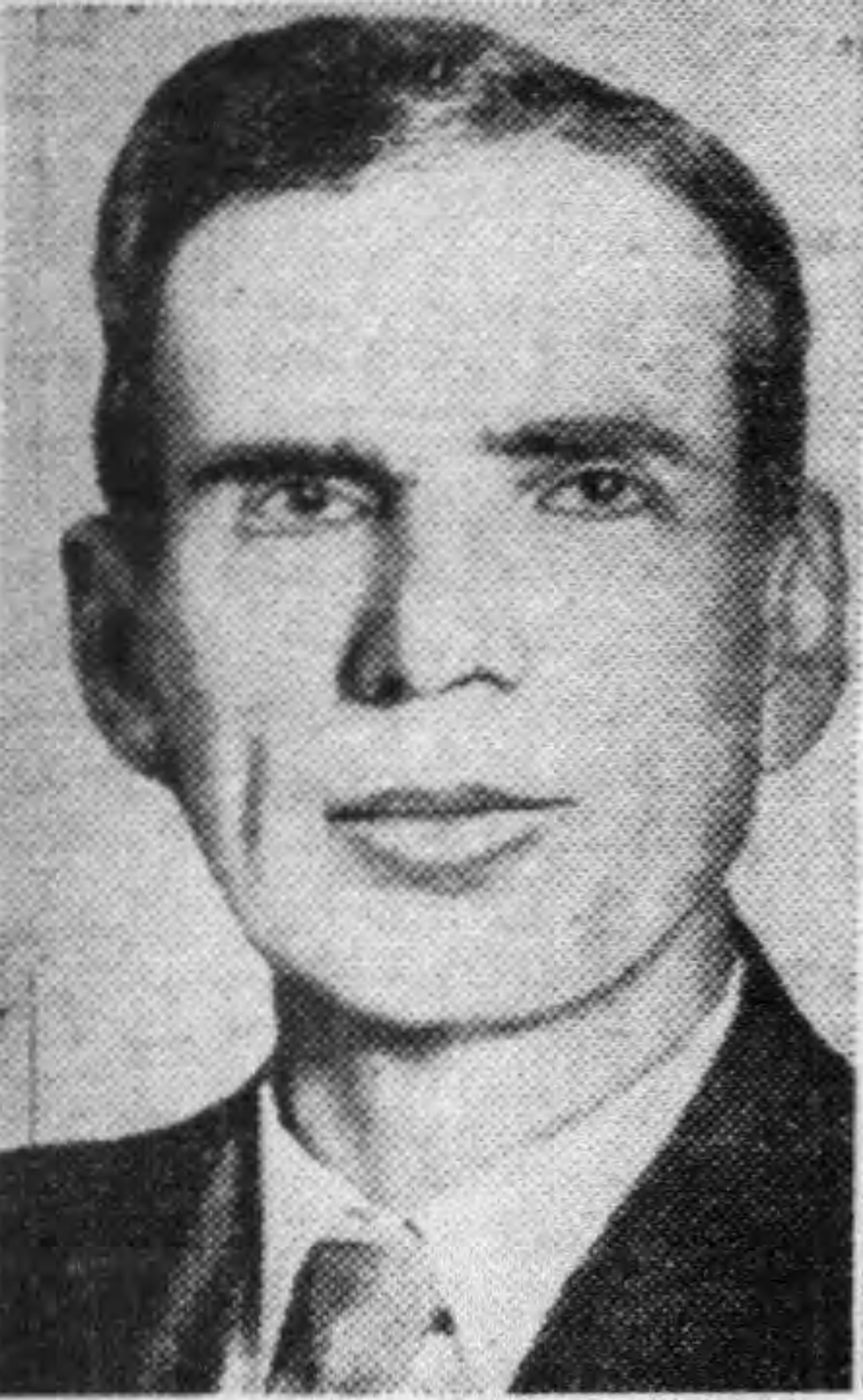
Horton c. 1933

Judge James Edwin Horton (1878 – March 1973) was a Circuit Judge for the Eighth Circuit Court in Alabama. He was elected in 1922 and again in 1928.

== Birth and education ==
Judge Horton was born January 4, 1878, the son of James Horton, Sr. and Emily Donelson. His mother was the great-niece of former President of the United States Andrew Jackson. His family bible shows he was born in Limestone County, AL. At some point during his childhood he moved to Athens, Alabama.

He had no formal education until the age of eight or nine. He was a sickly child and had to rely on his mother's care. Nothing has been known about Judge Horton's high school education. The next record of him appeared when he enrolled in Vanderbilt University's medical studies program. His decision to become a doctor was influenced by his father.

After a year Horton decided that medicine was not for him and transferred to Cumberland University in Lebanon, Tennessee and gained his B.A. in 1897. At Cumberland School of Law he earned his Bachelor of Law degree in 1899. Horton clerked for his father, a Probate Judge, before entering into a private practice.

== Career ==
Judge Horton served one term in the Alabama State Legislature from 1910–1914. Following this he served in the Alabama State Senate. His term as a Senator was cut short when a chancery court opening appeared, which he took.

He eventually left his seat on the chancery court, returning to his old law practice and farming his land. He continued with this life for some time, before being elected judge of the Eighth Circuit Court, as noted above. It was during his second term that Judge Horton got the most important case of his career: the re-trials of the Scottsboro Boys.

=== Scottsboro Boys re-trials ===
Judge Horton presided over the re-trials of the Scottsboro Boys. Both the prosecution and defense agreed with his choice. Numerous comparisons were made in the media to his resemblance to former President Abraham Lincoln. He was represented as the perfect man for the job. However, much to the prosecution's dismay, Judge Horton issued a startling rebuke to the State's case after a conviction and death penalty were handed down against Haywood Patterson. To quote:

History, sacred and profane, and the common experience of mankind teach us that women of the character shown in this case are prone for selfish reasons to make false accusations both of rape and of insult upon the slightest provocation for ulterior purposes. These women are shown, by the great weight of the evidence, on this very day before leaving Chattanooga, to have falsely accused two negroes of insulting them, and of almost precipitating a fight between one of the white boys they were in company with and these two negroes. This tendency on the part of the women shows that they are predisposed to make false accusations upon any occasion whereby their selfish ends may be gained.

The Court will not pursue the evidence any further.

As heretofore stated the law declares that a defendant should not be convicted without corroboration where the testimony of the prosecutrix bears on its face indications of improbability or unreliability and particularly when it is contradicted by other evidence.

The testimony of the prosecutrix in this case is not only uncorroborated, but it also bears on its face indications of improbability and is contradicted by other evidence, and in addition thereto the evidence greatly preponderates in favor of the defendant. It therefore becomes the duty of the Court under the law to grant the motion made in this case.

It is therefore ordered and adjudged by the Court that the motion be granted; that the verdict of the jury in this case and the judgment of the Court sentencing this defendant to death be set aside and that a new trial be and the same is hereby ordered.

— James E. Horton, Circuit Judge

After handing down this statement, Judge Horton was taken off the case by the Alabama Supreme Court. In his place, the State put Judge William Washington Callahan.

== End of career ==
The year after Judge Horton's statement, he lost his re-election bid to Aquilla Griffith. He then retired to his farm and tried to live a quiet life. This was disturbed in March 1934, when he sold the Tennessee Valley Authority his land so that they could build the Wheeler Dam.

Using the proceeds of this sale, Judge Horton and his wife, Anna Hobbs Horton, pooled their money and bought 1,400 acres (5.7 km^{2}) of land in Greenbrier, Alabama. He then took his wife's family home in Athens apart piece-by-piece and reassembled it in Greenbrier.

At Greenbrier, he devoted his time to farming. He raised cotton, corn, and soybeans, as well as the largest herd of Aberdeen-Angus cattle in Alabama.

He died in March 1973 at 95. He is immortalized in a bronze plaque on a wall just outside of the courtroom where he heard the Scottsboro cases, featuring his statement from the trial:

So far as the law is concerned it knows neither native nor alien, Jew nor Gentile, black nor white. This case is no different from any other. We have only to do our duty without fear or favor.

A statue of Judge Horton, made of bronze, stands on the west side of the Limestone County courthouse. Several members of the local community initiated the Judge Horton statue project, which was completed and unveiled in October 2017.
