= La Chapelle-Longueville =

- Commune
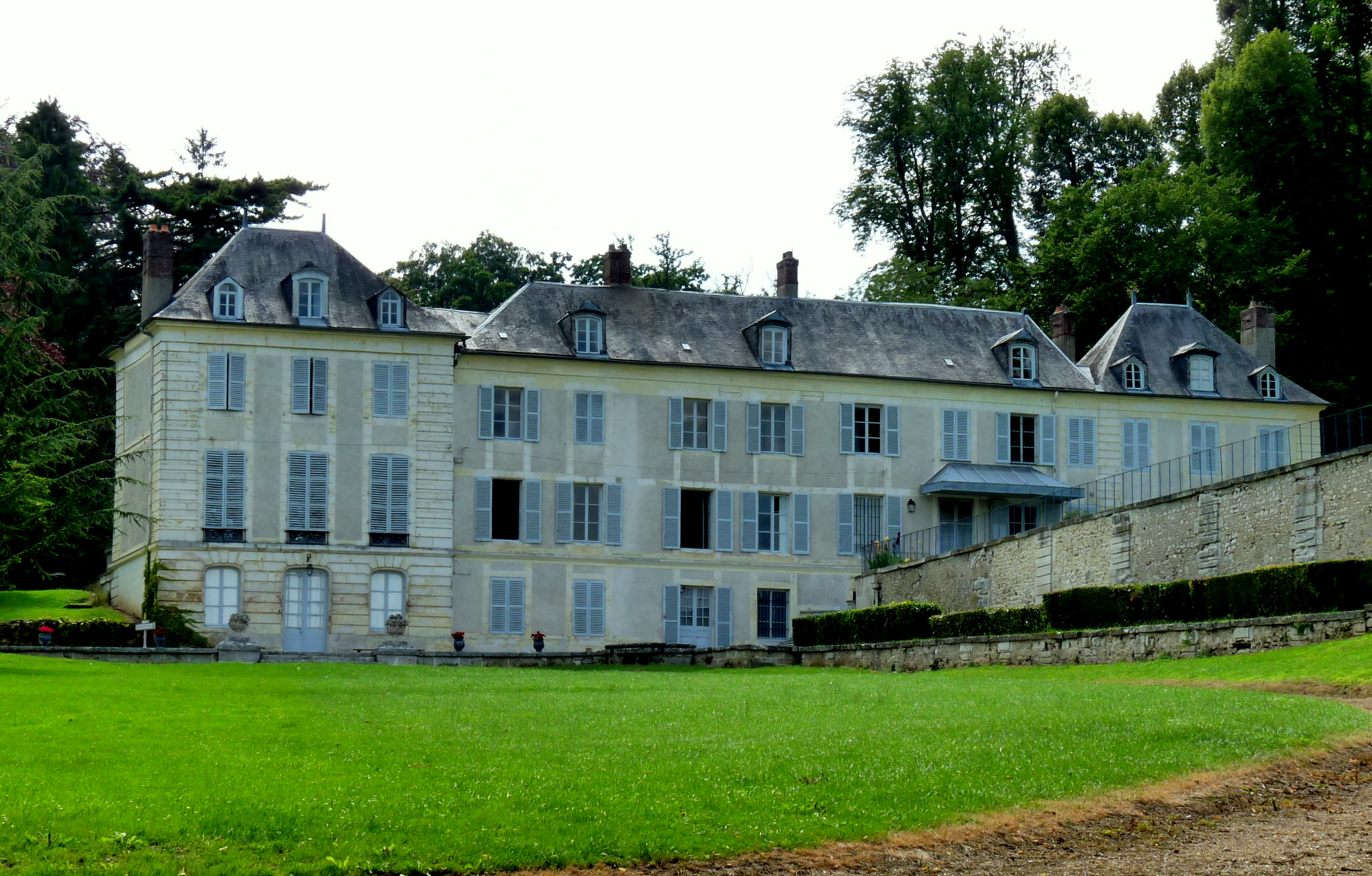
- The château in Saint-Just
- Location of La Chapelle-Longueville
- Location within France Location within Normandy
- Coordinates: 49°06′29″N 1°26′31″E
- Country: France
- Region: Normandy
- Department: Eure
- Arrondissement: Les Andelys
- Canton: Pacy-sur-Eure
- Intercommunality: Seine Normandie Agglomération

Government
  - Mayor (2023–2026): Karine Chérencey
- Area^{1}: 19.60 km^{2} (7.57 sq mi)
- Population (2023): 3,282
  - Density: 167.4/km^{2} (433.7/sq mi)
- Time zone: UTC+01:00 (CET)
  - Summer (DST): UTC+02:00 (CEST)
- INSEE/Postal code: 27554 /27950
- ^{1} French Land Register data, which excludes lakes, ponds, glaciers > 1 km^{2} (0.386 sq mi or 247 acres) and river estuaries.

La Chapelle-Longueville (French pronunciation: [la ʃapɛl lɔ̃ɡvil]) is a commune in the department of Eure, northern France. The municipality was established on 1 January 2017 by merger of the former communes of Saint-Just (the seat), La Chapelle-Réanville and Saint-Pierre-d'Autils.

== Population ==
Population data refer to the commune in its geography as of January 2025.

Historical population
Year	Pop.	±% p.a.
1968	1,478	—
1975	2,264	+6.28%
1982	2,769	+2.92%
1990	2,825	+0.25%
1999	3,347	+1.90%
2007	3,442	+0.35%
2012	3,429	−0.08%
2017	3,371	−0.34%
2023	3,282	−0.44%
Source: INSEE

== See also ==
- Communes of the Eure department
