= Saint-Pierre-d'Autils =

- Part of La Chapelle-Longueville
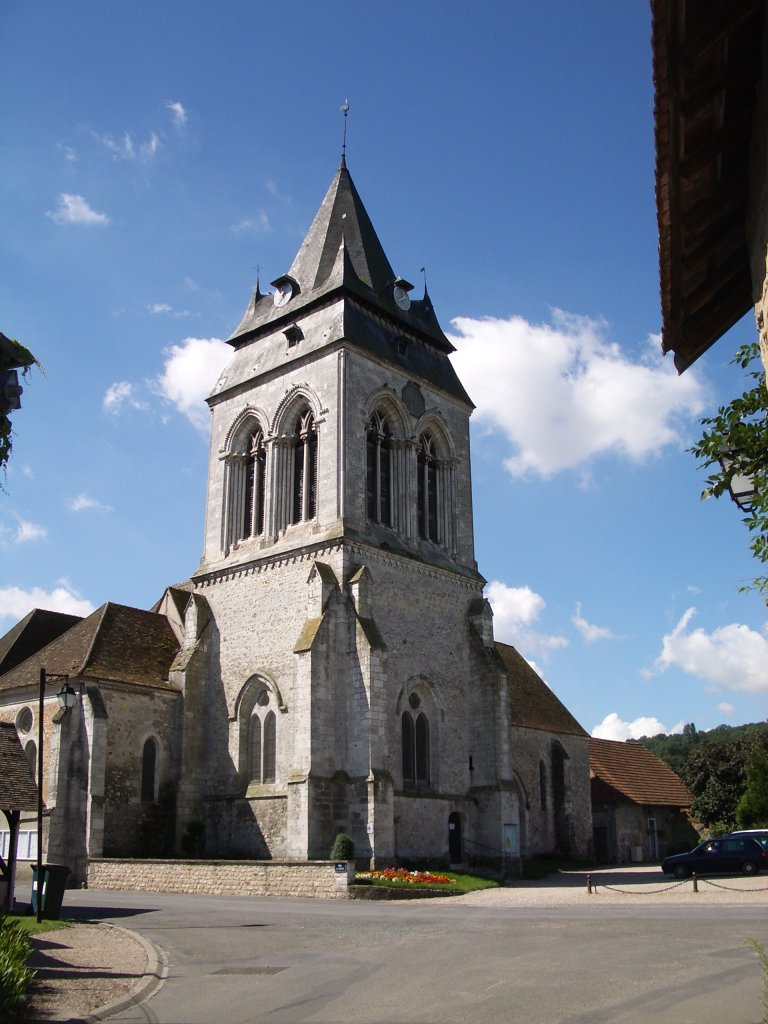

- Coat of arms
- Location of Saint-Pierre-d'Autils
- Location within France Location within Normandy
- Coordinates: 49°07′07″N 1°26′18″E
- Country: France
- Region: Normandy
- Department: Eure
- Arrondissement: Les Andelys
- Canton: Pacy-sur-Eure
- Commune: La Chapelle-Longueville
- Area^{1}: 7.09 km^{2} (2.74 sq mi)
- Elevation: 40 m (130 ft)
- Highest elevation: 139 m (456 ft)
- Lowest elevation: 12 m (39 ft)
- Population (2018): 945
  - Density: 133/km^{2} (345/sq mi)
- Time zone: UTC+01:00 (CET)
  - Summer (DST): UTC+02:00 (CEST)
- Postal code: 27950
- ^{1} French Land Register data, which excludes lakes, ponds, glaciers > 1 km^{2} (0.386 sq mi or 247 acres) and river estuaries.

Saint-Pierre-d'Autils (French pronunciation: [sɛ̃ pjɛʁ dotil]) is a former commune in the Eure department in Normandy in northern France. On 1 January 2017, it was merged into the new commune La Chapelle-Longueville. Its inhabitants are called Petrusians.

== Population ==
Historical population
Year	Pop.	±% p.a.
1962	775	—
1968	793	+0.38%
1975	905	+1.91%
1982	899	−0.09%
1990	939	+0.55%
1999	1,036	+1.10%
2006	1,024	−0.17%
2018	945	−0.67%
Source: EHESS and INSEE

== See also ==
- Communes of the Eure department
