= Sydney Fairbairn =

English cricketer (1892–1943)

Personal information
- Full name: Sydney George Fairbairn
- Born: 13 October 1892; Potts Point, Sydney, New South Wales, Australia
- Died: 19 January 1943 (aged 50); Bishopsgate, London, England

Domestic team information
- Years: Team
- 1913–1914: Buckinghamshire
- 1912/13: Marylebone Cricket Club

Career statistics
Competition	First-class
Matches	8
Runs scored	241
Batting average	20.08
100s/50s	–/1
Top score	62*
Balls bowled	600
Wickets	12
Bowling average	31.08
5 wickets in innings	–
10 wickets in match	–
Best bowling	3/55
Catches/stumpings	3/–
- Source: Cricinfo, 26 June 2011

Sydney George Fairbairn MC (13 October 1892 – 19 January 1943) was an English cricketer and British Army officer. The son of Victorian rower Steve Fairbairn and Eleanor Sharwood, he was born in "Carrick" Potts Point, New South Wales. (Note: Some sources, such as CricketArchive, put his place of birth as Sydney, Australia. This is supported by the Birth notice placed in The Argus on 15 October 1892, page 1 – http://nla.gov.au/nla.news-page299251. Others say Cape Colony, South Africa.)

Fairbairn made his first-class debut for the Marylebone Cricket Club against Barbados, during the MCC tour of the West Indies in early 1913. The remainder of his 7 first-class matches came on this tour, with his final appearance coming against British Guiana. In his 8 first-class appearances on tour, he scored 241 runs at an average of 20.08, which included a single half century score against British Guiana, in which he made an unbeaten 62. As an all-rounder, he took 12 wickets at a bowling average of 31.08, with best figures of 3/55. In that year's English cricket season, Fairbairn made his Minor Counties Championship for Buckinghamshire against Wiltshire. He made 6 further Minor Counties Championship matches for Buckinghamshire, the last coming against Wiltshire in 1914.

During the course of the First World War he had a short-lived marriage to Nancy Cunard, a writer, heiress and political activist. Their marriage lasted less than two years before they separated. In 1926 Fairbairn married Angela Maude, daughter of Onslow Powell Traherne (her mother Muriel married secondly Cecil Francis William Fane, of the family of the Earls of Westmorland; Angela was given the surname of 'Fane' in 1912) who survived him.

Fairbairn joined the Royal Buckinghamshire Hussars before the start of the First World War and was later wounded at Gallipoli. He joined up again in 1916 this time with the Grenadier Guards and was awarded the Military Cross in 1919. He re-joined the Guards in the Second World War and died on active service in London on 19 January 1943.

He was buried at St Nicholas Church, Steventon, Hampshire.

== Honours and awards ==
- 10 December 1919 Lt Sydney George Fairbairn of the Grenadier Guards (Special Reserve) and attached to the 3rd Battalion is awarded the Military Cross:

For conspicuous gallantry and devotion to duty at Preux au Sart of 4th November 1918. He worked his platoon through the village, driving the enemy out of several positions, and capturing their machine guns and eighteen prisoners. The skill and speed which he accomplished his task enabled the troops on his flanks to consolidate at dusk in a sound defensive position.

— London Gazette

== Notes and references ==
Notes
