= Saint-Just, Eure =

Commune in Normandy, France

Saint-Just
- Part of La Chapelle-Longueville
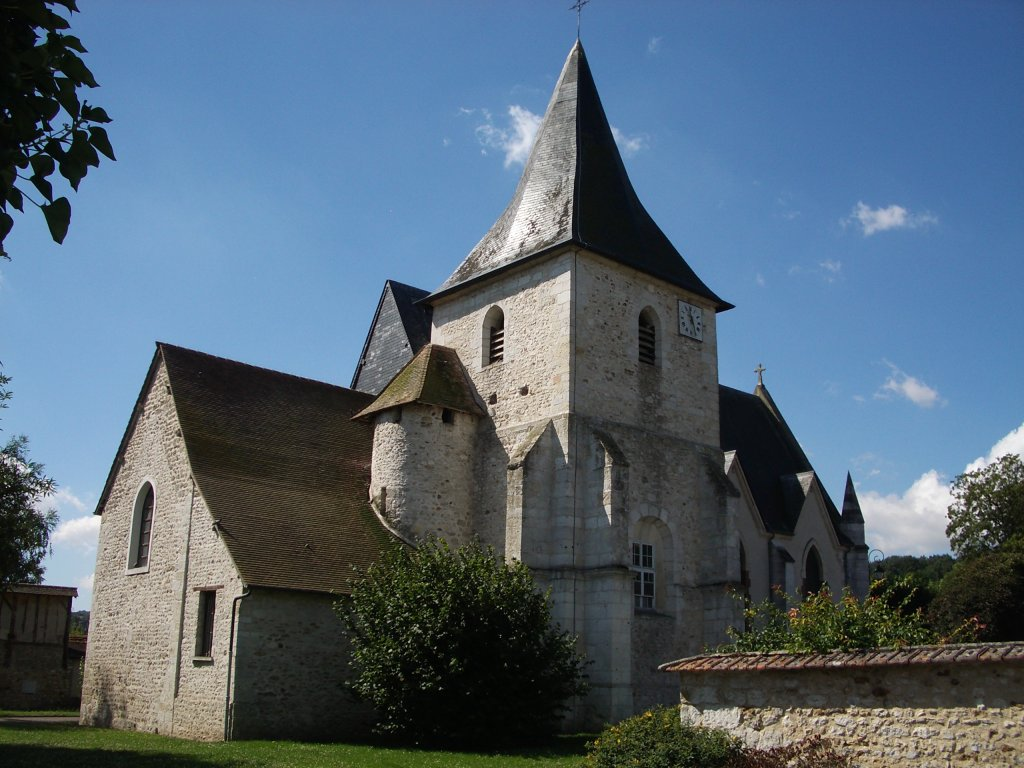
- Location of Saint-Just
- Location within France Location within Normandy
- Coordinates: 49°06′34″N 1°26′31″E
- Country: France
- Region: Normandy
- Department: Eure
- Arrondissement: Les Andelys
- Canton: Pacy-sur-Eure
- Commune: La Chapelle-Longueville
- Area^{1}: 4.44 km^{2} (1.71 sq mi)
- Elevation: 32 m (105 ft)
- Highest elevation: 139 m (456 ft)
- Lowest elevation: 13 m (43 ft)
- Population (2018): 1,283
  - Density: 289/km^{2} (748/sq mi)
- Time zone: UTC+01:00 (CET)
  - Summer (DST): UTC+02:00 (CEST)
- Postal code: 27950
- ^{1} French Land Register data, which excludes lakes, ponds, glaciers > 1 km^{2} (0.386 sq mi or 247 acres) and river estuaries.

Saint-Just (French pronunciation: [sɛ̃ ʒy(st)]) is a former commune in the Eure department of northern France. On 1 January 2017, it was merged into the new commune La Chapelle-Longueville.

== Population ==
Historical population
Year	Pop.	±% p.a.
1962	444	—
1968	506	+2.20%
1975	756	+5.90%
1982	840	+1.52%
1990	855	+0.22%
1999	1,292	+4.69%
2018	1,283	−0.04%
Source: EHESS and INSEE

== See also ==
- Communes of the Eure department
