= Henry Crowder =

American jazz musician (1890–1955)

- Born: 1890; Gainesville, Georgia
- Died: 1955 (aged 64–65); Washington, D.C.
- Occupation: Jazz musician

Henry Crowder (1890–1955) was an American jazz musician. He was an important figure in the European jazz culture of his time.

== Early life ==
Crowder was born in Gainesville, Georgia, to a poor family and was largely a self-taught musician. Crowder began his career playing piano in the brothels of Washington, D.C., and rose to become an important bandleader here before leaving for Europe in 1928 with Eddie South's Alabamians.

== Personal life ==
He was best known for his romantic and professional involvement with avant-garde poet, muse, and shipping heiress Nancy Cunard. They met in 1928 in Venice, where the Alabamians had an extended engagement to play, a residency at the Hotel Luna. Cunard’s 1934 anthology Negro is inspired by and dedicated to Crowder. Crowder also assisted Cunard in creating her Hours Press publishing house, which published Richard Aldington, Ezra Pound, and Samuel Beckett among others. Crowder’s influence on Cunard was profound. She claimed in one letter that: “Henry made me”. Cunard and Crowder collaborated on a book of music and poetry with contributions from Samuel Beckett, Richard Aldington, and pictures by Man Ray.

By Crowder’s own account, musician Sidney Bechet was deported from France after an argument with a member of Crowder’s group turned violent and several bystanders were shot.

Crowder died in Washington, District of Columbia, having largely given up performing and recording jazz on his return from Europe in the 1940s.

Henry Crowder was married to May Frances "Frankie" Turner, Eleanor Roosevelt's seamstress at the White House, with whom he had one son, Henry Jr.

== Europe ==
Henry Crowder lived for almost 12 years in Paris and Brussels. During his stay there, the Nazis invaded France. He was interned for 22 and a half months in POW camps, first in Belgium then in Germany.
