= Ellen Feldman =

American novelist

- Born: 1941 (age 84–85)
- Education: Bryn Mawr College (BA, MA)
- Occupation: Writer
- Writing career
- Pen name: Amanda Russell

Ellen Feldman (born 1941) is an American writer. She grew up in New Jersey and attended Bryn Mawr College, and graduated with B.A. and an M.A. in modern history. She also worked for a publishing firm in New York City and continued with graduate studies at Columbia University.

Feldman currently lives in New York City and East Hampton, New York.

== Works ==
- A.K.A. Katherine Walden (1982)
- Conjugal Rites (1986), Elizabeth Villars
- Looking for Love (1990), Elizabeth Villars
- Too Close for Comfort (1994), Elizabeth Villars
- Rearview Mirror (1995)
- God Bless the Child (1998)
- Lucy (2003)
- The Boy Who Loved Anne Frank (2005)
- Scottsboro (2008)
- Next to Love (2011)
- The Unwitting (2014)
- Terrible Virtue (2016)
- Paris Never Leaves You (2020)
- The Living and the Lost (2021)

She has also written under the pseudonym Amanda Russell.

=== Lucy ===
Lucy (2003), was about Franklin Roosevelt's love for Lucy Mercer, who was the social secretary of Eleanor Roosevelt, his wife.

=== Scottsboro ===
Scottsboro was a 2009 novel about the Scottsboro Boys, nine black youths controversially accused of rape. Lionel Shriver in The Telegraph (UK) found it "a pleasure to read" despite the horrors it described. It was shortlisted for the Orange Prize for Fiction in 2009.

=== Next to Love ===
Her novel Next to Love (2011), tells the story of three Massachusetts women from the 1940s to 1960s. It was inspired by the true story of the Bedford Boys, a group of men from around Bedford, Virginia, many of whom were killed in the first few minutes of the D-Day landings.
