= Scottsboro Boys =

1931 false conviction in the US

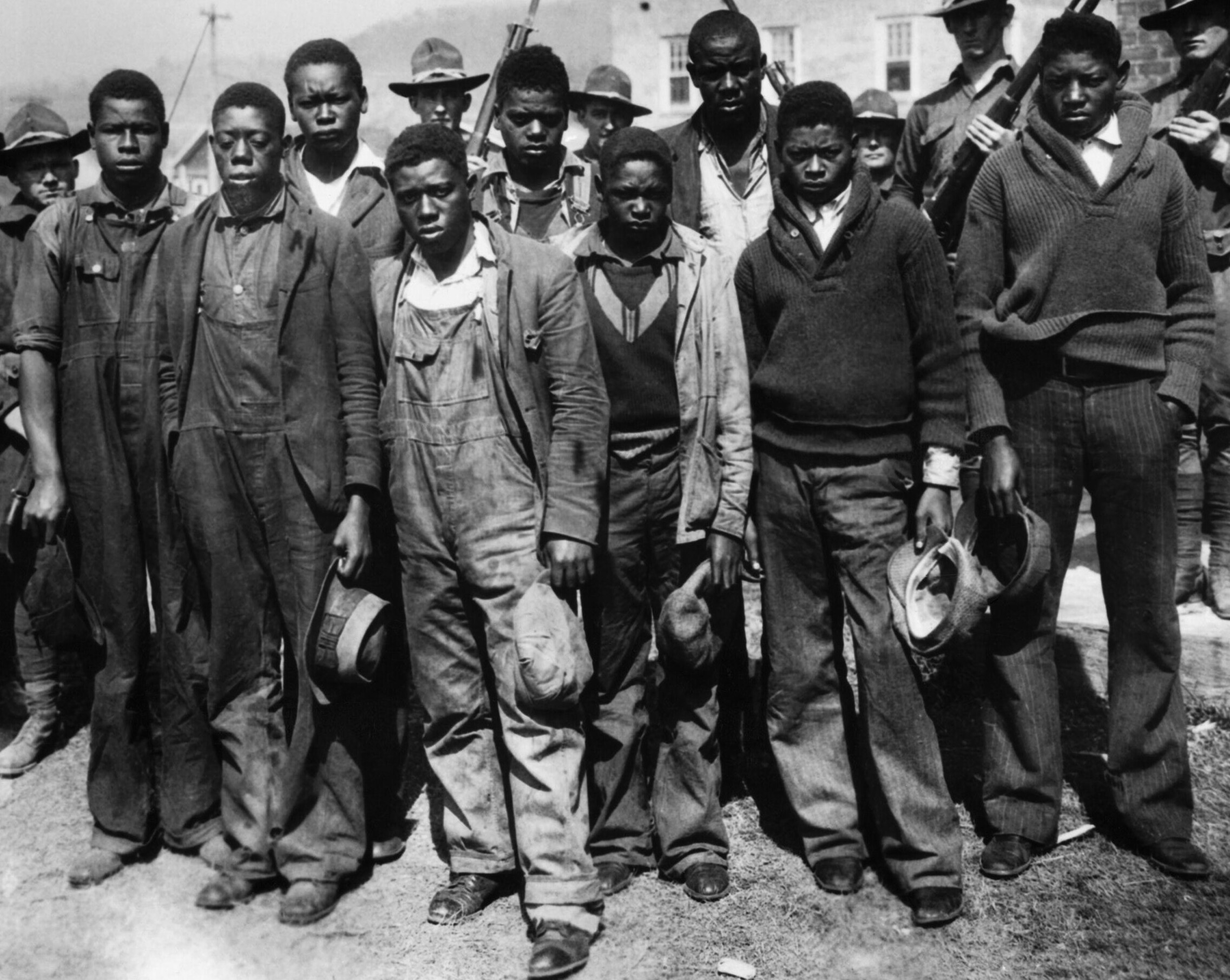
The Scottsboro Boys in 1931. From left to right: Clarence Norris, Olen Montgomery, Andy Wright, Willie Roberson, Ozie Powell, Eugene Williams, Charlie Weems, Roy Wright, and Haywood Patterson.

The Scottsboro Boys were nine African American male teenagers accused of raping a young white woman and a 17-year-old white girl in 1931. The landmark set of legal cases from this incident dealt with racism and the right to a fair trial. The cases included a lynch mob before the suspects had been indicted, all-white juries, rushed trials, and disruptive mobs. It is commonly cited as an example of a legal injustice in the United States legal system.

On March 25, 1931, two dozen people were "hoboing" on a freight train traveling between Chattanooga and Memphis, Tennessee. The hobos were an equal mix of blacks and whites. A group of whites gathered rocks and attempted to force all the black teenagers from the train, but were unsuccessful. The humiliated white teenagers jumped or were forced off the train and reported to a nearby train master that they had been attacked by a group of black teenage boys. Shortly thereafter, the police stopped and searched the train at Paint Rock, Alabama and arrested the black teenage boys. Two young white females were also taken to the jail, where they accused the African American teenage boys of rape.

The case was first heard in Scottsboro, Alabama, in three rushed trials, in which the defendants received poor legal representation. All but 14-year-old Roy Wright were convicted of rape and sentenced to death (the common sentence in Alabama at the time for black men convicted of raping white women), even though there was no medical evidence indicating that rape had taken place. The Alabama Supreme Court affirmed seven of the eight convictions and granted 13-year-old Eugene Williams a new trial because he was a minor. The cases were twice appealed to the United States Supreme Court, which led to landmark decisions on the conduct of trials. In Powell v. Alabama (1932), the Supreme Court ordered new trials. During the retrials, one alleged victim admitted to fabricating the rape story and asserted that none of the Scottsboro Boys touched either of the alleged victims. The jury still found the defendants guilty, but the judge set aside the verdict and granted a new trial. The judge was replaced and the case retried. For the third time, a jury—now with one African American member—returned a guilty verdict. The case was sent to the Supreme Court on appeal. It ruled that African Americans had to be included on juries and ordered the cases be retried. Charges were finally dropped for four of the nine defendants. The other five were convicted and received sentences ranging from 75 years to death, although the sentence was soon commuted to life imprisonment with parole.

The case of the Scottsboro Boys is widely considered a legal injustice, highlighted by the state's use of all-white juries. African Americans in Alabama had been disenfranchised since the Reconstruction era and thus were not allowed on juries because jurors were selected from voter rolls. The case has also been explored in many works of literature, music, theater, film and television. On November 21, 2013, Alabama's parole board voted to grant posthumous pardons to the three Scottsboro Boys who had not been pardoned or had their convictions overturned.

== Arrests and accusations ==
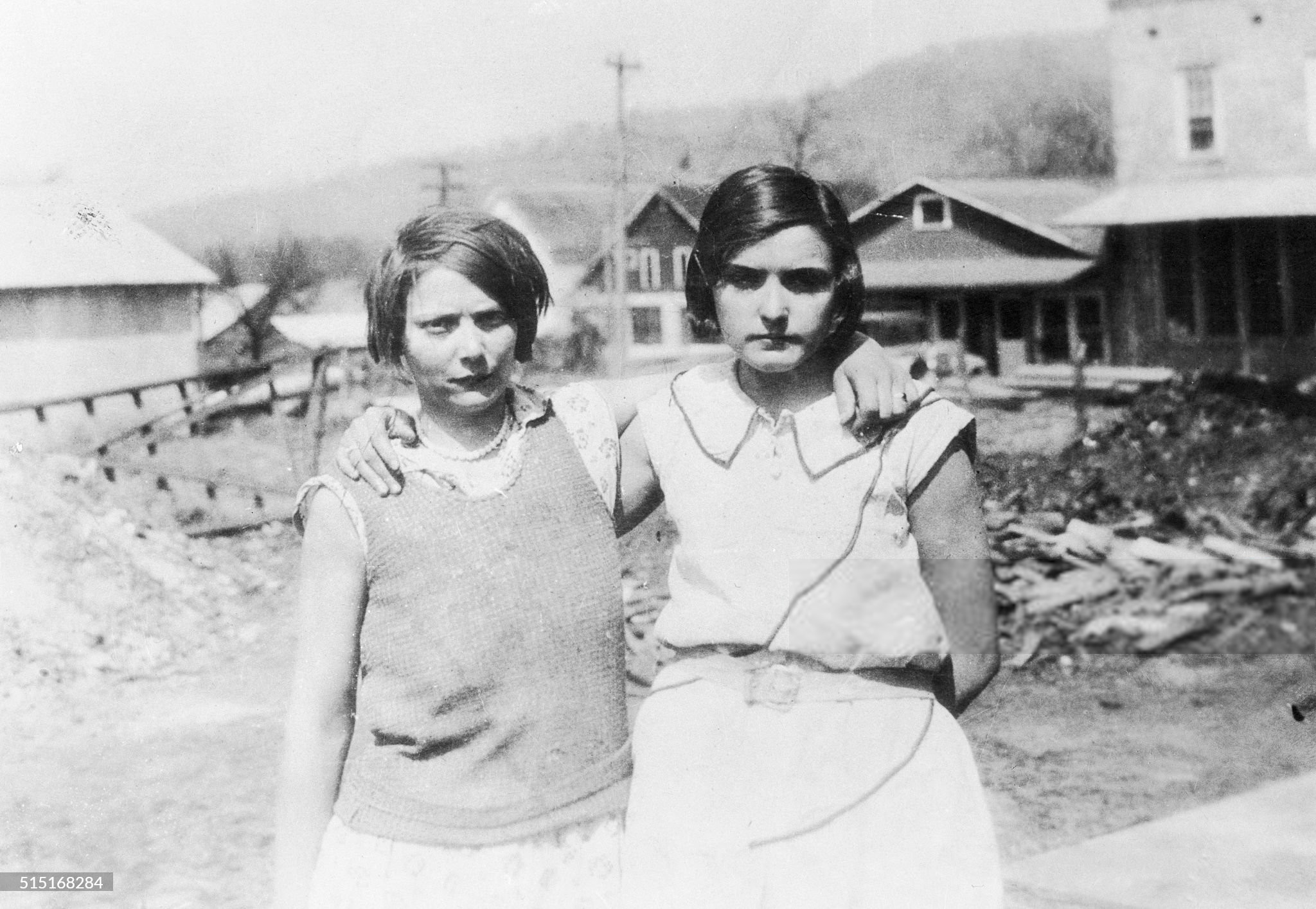
Victoria Price (left) and Ruby Bates (right) in 1931

On March 25, 1931, nine black teenage males were riding on a freight train on the Southern Railway line between Chattanooga and Memphis, Tennessee, along with several white males and two white females. A fight broke out between the white and black groups near the Lookout Mountain tunnel, and the whites were kicked off the train. The whites went to a sheriff in the nearby town of Paint Rock, Alabama, and claimed they had been assaulted. The sheriff gathered a posse and gave orders to search for and "capture every Negro on the train." The posse arrested all black passengers on the train for assault.

The black teenagers were: Haywood Patterson (age 18), who claimed that he had ridden freight trains for so long that he could light a cigarette on the top of a moving train; Clarence Norris (age 19), who had left behind ten brothers and sisters in rural Georgia; Charles "Charlie" Weems (age 19); brothers James Andrew "Andy" Wright (age 19) and Leroy R. "Roy" Wright (age 14), who were leaving home for the first time; the nearly blind Olen Montgomery (age 17), who was hoping to get a job in order to pay for a pair of glasses; Ozie Powell (age 16); Willie Roberson (age 16), who suffered from such severe syphilis that he could barely walk; and Eugene Williams (age 13). Of the nine, only four knew each other prior to boarding.

Two white females were also aboard. 21-year-old Victoria Price and 17-year-old Ruby Bates told a member of the posse that they had been raped by a group of black teenagers. The posse brought the women to the jail where the accused were held, and they identified them as their attackers. A doctor was summoned to examine Price and Bates for signs of rape; none was found. A widely published photo showed the two women shortly after the arrests in 1931.

There was no evidence (beyond the women's testimony) pointing to the guilt of the accused, yet that was irrelevant due to the prevalent racism in the South at the time. Black men were constantly being policed by white men for signs of sexual interest in white women, which could lead to lynchings of the accused black men. Price and Bates may have told the police that they were raped to divert police attention from themselves. As suspected prostitutes, they risked not only arrest but also prosecution for violating the Mann Act by crossing a state line "for immoral purposes".

== Lynch mobs ==
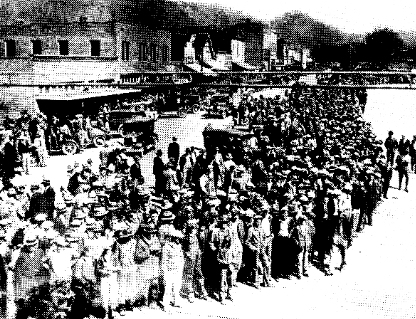
The crowd at Scottsboro in April 1931

In the Jim Crow South, lynching of black males accused of raping or murdering whites was common; word quickly spread of the arrest and rape story. Soon a lynch mob gathered at the jail in Scottsboro, demanding the youths be surrendered to them.

Sheriff Matt Wann stood in front of the jail and addressed the mob, saying he would kill the first person to come through the door. He removed his belt and handed his gun to one of his deputies. He walked through the mob and the crowd parted to let him through; Wann was not touched by anyone. He walked across the street to the courthouse where he telephoned governor Benjamin M. Miller, who mobilized the Alabama Army National Guard to protect the jail. Wann took the defendants to the county seat of Gadsden, Alabama, for indictment and to await trial. Although rape was potentially a capital offense in Alabama, the defendants at this point were not allowed to consult an attorney.

== Trials ==
The prisoners were taken to court by 118 Alabama guardsmen armed with machine guns. It was market day in Scottsboro, and farmers were in town to sell produce and buy supplies. A crowd of thousands soon formed. Courthouse access required a permit due to the salacious nature of the testimony expected. As the United States Supreme Court later described this situation, "the proceedings ... took place in an atmosphere of tense, hostile, and excited public sentiment." For each trial, all-white juries were selected. There were few African Americans in the jury pool, as the 1901 Alabama Constitution had been designed to disenfranchise African Americans and poor whites, and African Americans were often disqualified from jury service.

=== Defense attorneys ===
The pace of the trials was very fast before the standing-room-only, all-white audience. The judge and prosecutor wanted to speed the nine trials to avoid violence, so the first trial took a day and a half, and the rest took place one right after the other, in just one day. The judge had ordered the Alabama bar to assist the defendants, but the only attorney who volunteered was 69-year-old Milo Moody, who had not defended a case in decades. The judge persuaded Stephen Roddy, a Chattanooga, Tennessee real estate lawyer, to assist him. Roddy admitted he had not had time to prepare and was not familiar with Alabama law, but agreed to aid Moody.

Because of the mob atmosphere, Roddy petitioned the court for a change of venue, entering into evidence newspaper and law enforcement accounts describing the crowd as "impelled by curiosity". Local circuit judge Alfred E. Hawkins found that the crowd was curious and not hostile.

=== Norris and Weems trial ===
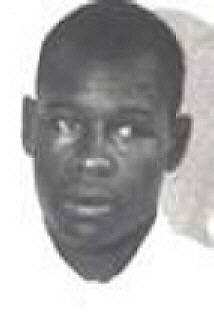
Norris in 1931

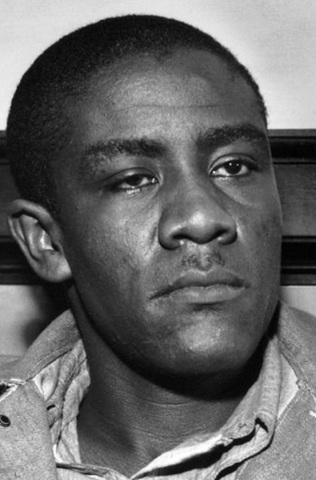
Weems in 1933

Clarence Norris and Charlie Weems were tried first. During prosecution testimony, Victoria Price stated that she and Ruby Bates witnessed the fight, that one of the black men had a gun, and that they all raped her at knifepoint. During cross-examination by Roddy, Price livened her testimony with wisecracks that brought roars of laughter.

Dr. Bridges testified that his examination of Victoria Price found no vaginal tearing (which would have indicated rape) and that she had had semen in her for several hours. Ruby Bates failed to mention that either she or Price were raped until she was cross-examined. The prosecution ended with testimony from three men who claimed the black youths fought the white youths, put them off the train, and "took charge" of the white girls. The prosecution rested without calling any of the white youths as witness.

During the defense testimony, defendant Charles Weems testified that he was not part of the fight, that Patterson had the pistol, and that he had not seen the white girls on the train until the train pulled into Paint Rock.

Defendant Clarence Norris stunned the courtroom by implicating the other defendants. He denied participating in the fight or being in the gondola car where the fight took place. But he said that he saw the alleged rapes by the other blacks from his spot atop the next boxcar. The defense put on no further witnesses.

During closing, the prosecution said, "If you don't give these men death sentences, the electric chair might as well be abolished." The defense made no closing argument, nor did it address the sentencing of the death penalty for their clients.

The Court started the next case while the jury was still deliberating the first. The first jury deliberated for less than two hours before returning a guilty verdict and imposed the death sentence on both Weems and Norris.

=== Patterson trial ===
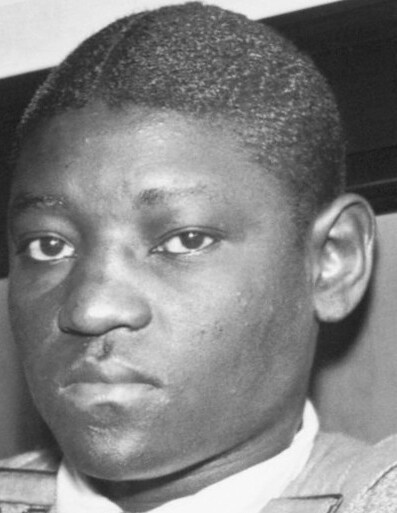
Patterson in 1933

The trial for Haywood Patterson occurred while the Norris and Weems cases were still under consideration by the jury. When the jury returned its verdict from the first trial, the jury from the second trial was taken out of the courtroom. When the verdicts of guilty were announced, the courtroom erupted in cheers, as did the crowd outside. A band, there to play for a show of Ford Motor Company cars outside, began playing "Hail, Hail, the Gang's All Here" and "There'll be a Hot Time in the Old Town Tonight". The celebration was so loud that it was most likely heard by the second jury waiting inside.

After the outburst, the defense of Patterson moved for a mistrial, but Judge Hawkins denied the motion and testimony continued. The second trial continued. During the second trial's prosecution testimony, Victoria Price mostly stuck with her story, stating flatly that Patterson raped her. She accused Patterson of shooting one of the white youths. Price volunteered, "I have not had intercourse with any other white man but my husband. I want you to know that."

Dr. Bridges repeated his testimony from the first trial. Other witnesses testified that "the negroes" had gotten out of the same gondola car as Price and Bates; a farmer claimed to have seen white women on the train with the black youths.

Patterson defended his actions, testifying again that he had seen Price and Bates in the gondola car, but had nothing to do with them. On cross-examination he testified that he had seen "all but three of those negroes ravish that girl", but then changed his story. He said that he had not seen "any white women" until the train "got to Paint Rock."

The younger Wright brother testified that Patterson was not involved with the girls, but that nine black teenagers had sex with the girls. On cross-examination, Roy Wright testified that Patterson "was not involved with the girls", but that "The long, tall, black fellow had the pistol. He is not here." He claimed also to have been on top of the boxcar, and that Clarence Norris had a knife.

Co-defendants Andy Wright, Eugene Williams, and Ozie Powell all testified that they did not see any women on the train. Olen Montgomery testified that he sat alone on the train and did not know of any of the referenced events. The jury quickly convicted Patterson and recommended death by electric chair.

=== Powell, Roberson, Williams, Montgomery, and Wright trial ===
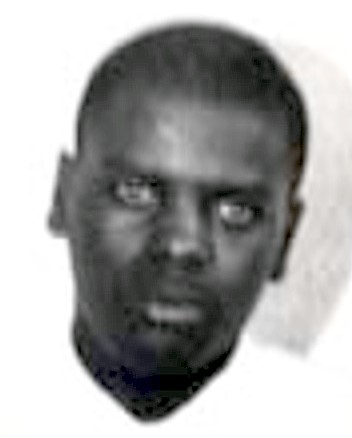
Ozie Powell

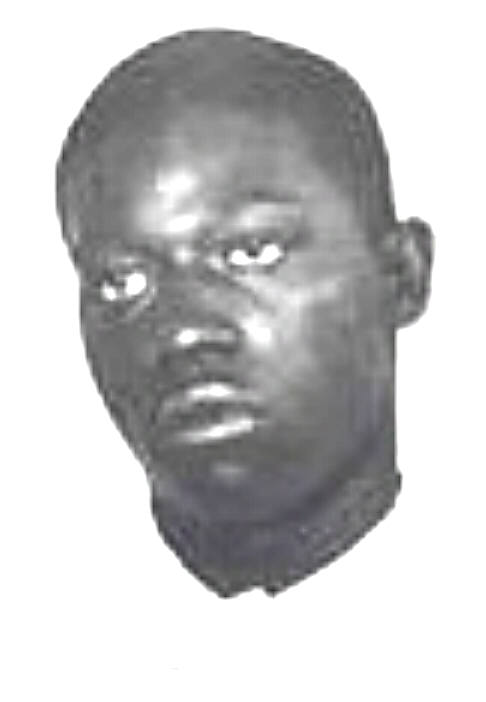
Willie Roberson

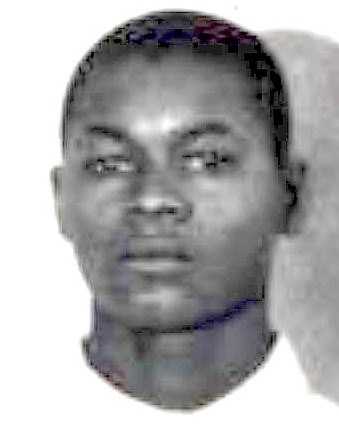
Eugene Williams

Olen Montgomery

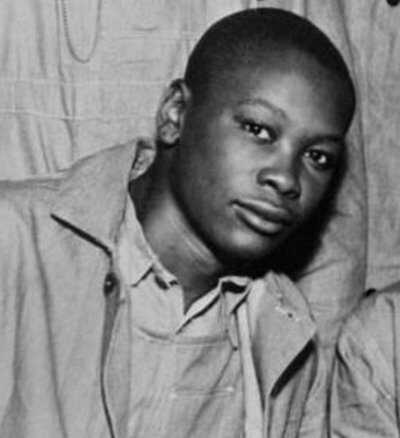
Andy Wright

This trial began within minutes of the previous case. Price repeated her testimony, adding that the black teenagers split into two groups of six to rape her and Ruby Bates. Price accused Eugene Williams of holding the knife to her throat, and said that all of the other teenagers had knives. Under cross-examination she gave more detail, adding that someone held a knife to the white teenager, Gilley, during the rapes.

This trial was interrupted and the jury sent out when the Patterson jury reported; they found him guilty. There was no uproar at the announcement. Ruby Bates took the stand, identifying all five defendants as among the 12 entering the gondola car, putting off the whites, and "ravishing" her and Price.

Dr. Bridges was the next prosecution witness, repeating his earlier testimony. On cross-examination, Bridges testified detecting no movement in the spermatozoa found in either woman, suggesting intercourse had taken place sometime before. He also testified that defendant Willie Roberson was "diseased with syphilis and gonorrhea, a bad case of it." He admitted under questioning that Price told him that she had had sex with her husband and that Bates had earlier had intercourse as well, before the alleged rape events.

The defense called the only witnesses they had had time to find – the defendants. No new evidence was revealed. The next prosecution witnesses testified that Roberson had run over train cars leaping from one to another and that he was in much better shape than he claimed. Slim Gilley testified that he saw "every one of those five in the gondola," but did not confirm that he had seen the women raped. The defense again waived closing argument, and surprisingly the prosecution then proceeded to make more argument. The defense objected vigorously, but the Court allowed it.

Judge Hawkins then instructed the jury, stating that any defendant aiding in the crime was as guilty as any of the defendants who had committed it. The jury began deliberating at four in the afternoon.

=== Roy Wright trial ===
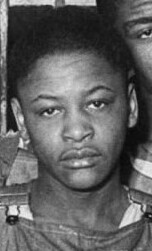
Wright in 1933

The prosecution agreed that 14-year-old Roy Wright was too young for the death penalty, and did not seek it. The prosecution presented only testimony from Price and Bates. His case went to the jury at nine that evening. His jury and that from the trial of five men were deliberating at the same time.

At nine on Thursday morning, April 9, 1931, the five defendants in Wednesday's trial were all found guilty. Roy Wright's jury could not agree on sentencing, and was declared a hung jury that afternoon. All the jurors agreed on his guilt, but seven insisted on the death sentence while five held out for life imprisonment (in cases like this, that was often an indication that the jurors believed the suspect was innocent but they were unwilling to go against community norms of conviction). Judge Hawkins declared a mistrial.

=== Death sentences ===
The eight convicted defendants were assembled on April 9, 1931, and sentenced to death by electric chair. The Associated Press reported that the defendants were "calm" and "stoic" as Judge Hawkins handed down the death sentences one after another.

Judge Hawkins set the executions for July 10, 1931, the earliest date Alabama law allowed. While appeals were filed, the Alabama Supreme Court issued indefinite stays of executions 72 hours before the defendants were scheduled to die. The men's cells were next to the execution chamber, and they heard the July 10, 1931 execution of Will Stokes, a black man from St. Clair County convicted of murder. They later recalled that he "died hard."

=== Help from Communist Party and NAACP ===
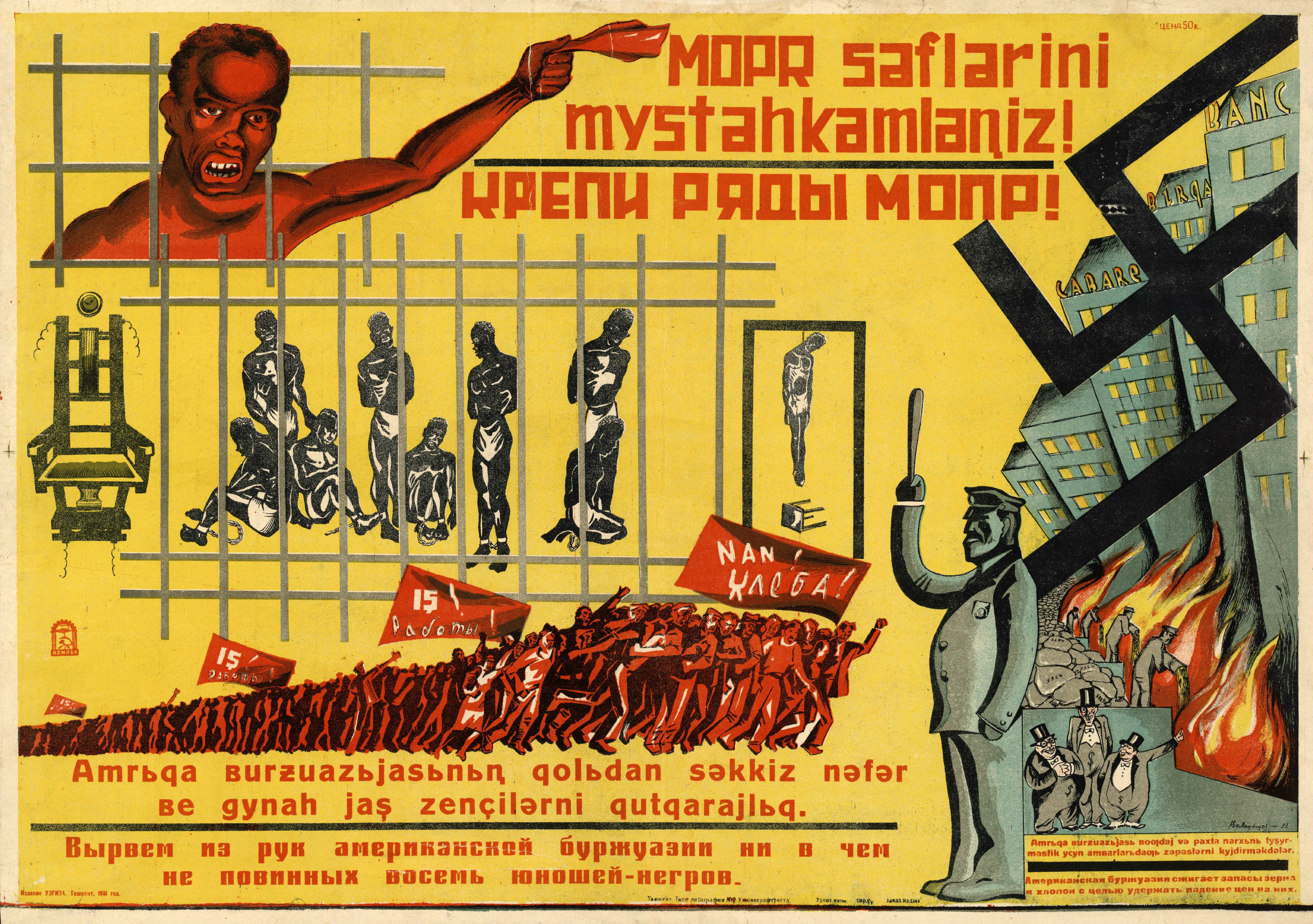
International Red Aid propaganda poster in Russian and Uzbek language: "Wrest eight innocent young negroes out of the hands of the American bourgeoisie!" American policeman is depicted in front of the Nazi swastika with baton raised against food rioters

The NAACP hesitated to take on the rape case. Thus, the Communist Party attorneys came to aid the defendants first. After a demonstration in Harlem, the Communist Party USA took an interest in the Scottsboro case. Chattanooga Party member James S. Allen edited the communist Southern Worker, and publicized "the plight of the boys". The Party used its legal arm, the International Labor Defense (ILD), to take up their cases, and persuaded the defendants' parents to let the party champion their cause. The ILD retained attorneys George W. Chamlee, who filed the first motions, and Joseph R. Brodsky.

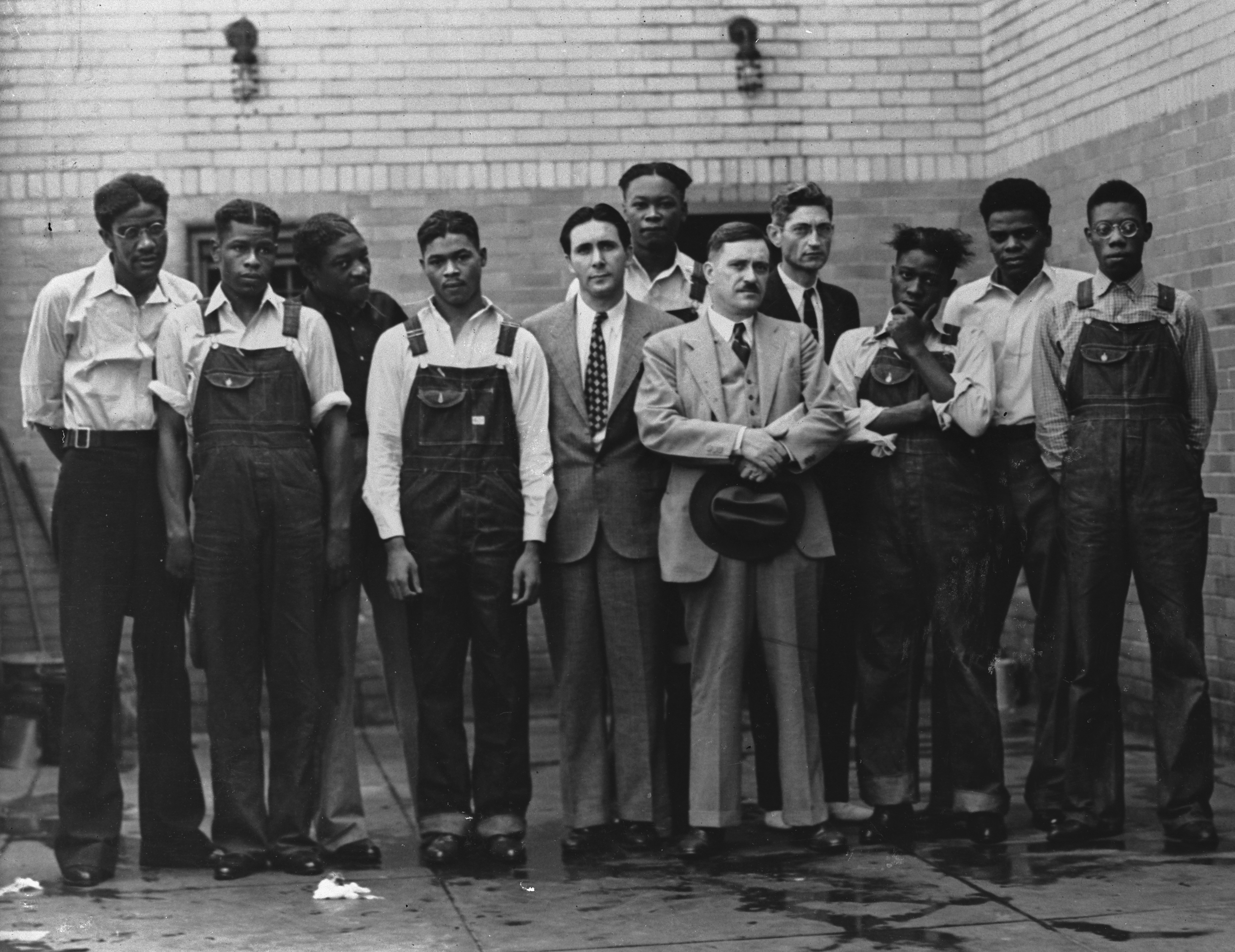
Communist Party functionary Earl Browder (fifth from right) with the Scottsboro Boys, 1931

Later, the NAACP also offered to handle the case, offering the services of famed criminal defense attorney Clarence Darrow. However, the Scottsboro defendants decided to let the ILD handle their appeal. Chamlee moved for new trials for all defendants. Private investigations took place, revealing that Price and Bates had been prostitutes in Tennessee, who regularly serviced both black and white clientele. Chamlee offered judge Hawkins affidavits to that effect, but the judge forbade him to read them out loud. The defense argued that this evidence proved that the two women had likely lied at trial. Chamlee pointed to the uproar in Scottsboro that occurred when the verdicts were reported as further evidence that the change of venue should have been granted.

=== Appeal to Alabama Supreme Court ===
Following Judge Hawkins' denial of the motions for a new trial, attorney George W. Chamlee filed an appeal and was granted a stay of execution. Chamlee was joined by Communist Party attorney Joseph Brodsky and ILD attorney Irving Schwab. The defense team argued that their clients had not had adequate representation, had insufficient time for counsel to prepare their cases, had their juries intimidated by the crowd, and finally, that it was unconstitutional for blacks to have been excluded from the jury. In the question of procedural errors, the state Supreme Court found none.

=== Williams' ruling ===
On March 24, 1932, the Alabama Supreme Court ruled against seven of the eight remaining Scottsboro Boys, confirming the convictions and death sentences of all but the 13-year-old Eugene Williams. It upheld seven of eight rulings from the lower court.

The Alabama Supreme Court granted 13-year-old Eugene Williams, who was mistakenly thought to be older than he really was, a new trial on account of his age, which saved him from the immediate threat of the electric chair.

=== Weems and Norris ruling ===
The Court upheld the lower court's change of venue decision, upheld the testimony of Ruby Bates, and reviewed the testimony of the various witnesses. As to the "newly discovered evidence", the Court ruled: "There is no contention on the part of the defendants, that they had sexual intercourse with the alleged victim ... with her consent ... so the defendants would not be granted a new trial."

As to representation, the Court found "that the defendants were represented by counsel who thoroughly cross examined the state's witnesses, and presented such evidence as was available." Again, the Court affirmed these convictions as well. The Alabama Supreme Court affirmed seven of the eight convictions and rescheduled the executions.

==== Dissent ====
Chief Justice John C. Anderson dissented, agreeing with the defense in many of its motions. Anderson stated that the defendants had not been accorded a fair trial and strongly dissented from the decision to affirm their sentences. He wrote, "While the constitution guarantees to the accused a speedy trial, it is of greater importance that it should be by a fair and impartial jury, ex vi termini ("by definition"), a jury free from bias or prejudice, and, above all, from coercion and intimidation."

He pointed out that the National Guard had shuttled the defendants back and forth each day from jail, and that this fact alone was enough to have a coercive effect on the jury. Anderson criticized how the defendants were represented. He noted that Roddy "declined to appear as appointed counsel and did so only as amicus curiae." He continued, "These defendants were confined in jail in another county ... and local counsel had little opportunity to ... prepare their defense." Moreover, they "would have been represented by able counsel had a better opportunity been given." Justice Anderson also pointed out the failure of the defense to make closing arguments as an example of under zealous defense representation. About the courtroom outburst, Justice Anderson noted that "there was great applause ... and this was bound to have influence."

Anderson noted that, as the punishment for rape ranged between ten years and death, some of the teenagers should have been found "less culpable than others", and therefore should have received lighter sentences. Anderson concluded, "No matter how revolting the accusation, how clear the proof, or how degraded or even brutal, the offender, the Constitution, the law, the very genius of Anglo-American liberty demand a fair and impartial trial."

=== Appeal to United States Supreme Court ===
The case went to the United States Supreme Court on October 10, 1932, amidst tight security. The ILD retained Walter Pollak to handle the appeal. The Attorney General of Alabama, Thomas E. Knight, represented the State.

Pollak argued that the defendants had been denied due process: first, due to the mob atmosphere; and second, because of the strange attorney appointments and their poor performance at trial. Last, he argued that African Americans were systematically excluded from jury duty contrary to the Fourteenth Amendment.

Knight countered that there had been no mob atmosphere at the trial, and pointed to the finding by the Alabama Supreme Court that the trial had been fair and representation "able." He told the court that he had "no apologies" to make.

In a landmark decision, the United States Supreme Court reversed the convictions on the ground that the due process clause of the United States Constitution guarantees the effective assistance of counsel at a criminal trial. In an opinion written by Associate Justice George Sutherland, the Supreme Court found the defendants had been denied effective counsel. Chief Justice Anderson's previous dissent was quoted repeatedly in this decision.

The Supreme Court did not fault Moody and Roddy for lack of an effective defense, noting that both had told Judge Hawkins that they had not had time to prepare their cases. They said the problem was with the way Judge Hawkins "immediately hurried to trial." This conclusion did not find the Scottsboro defendants innocent but ruled that the procedures violated their rights to due process under the Fifth and Fourteenth Amendments. The Supreme Court sent the case back to Judge Hawkins for a retrial.

== Decatur trials ==
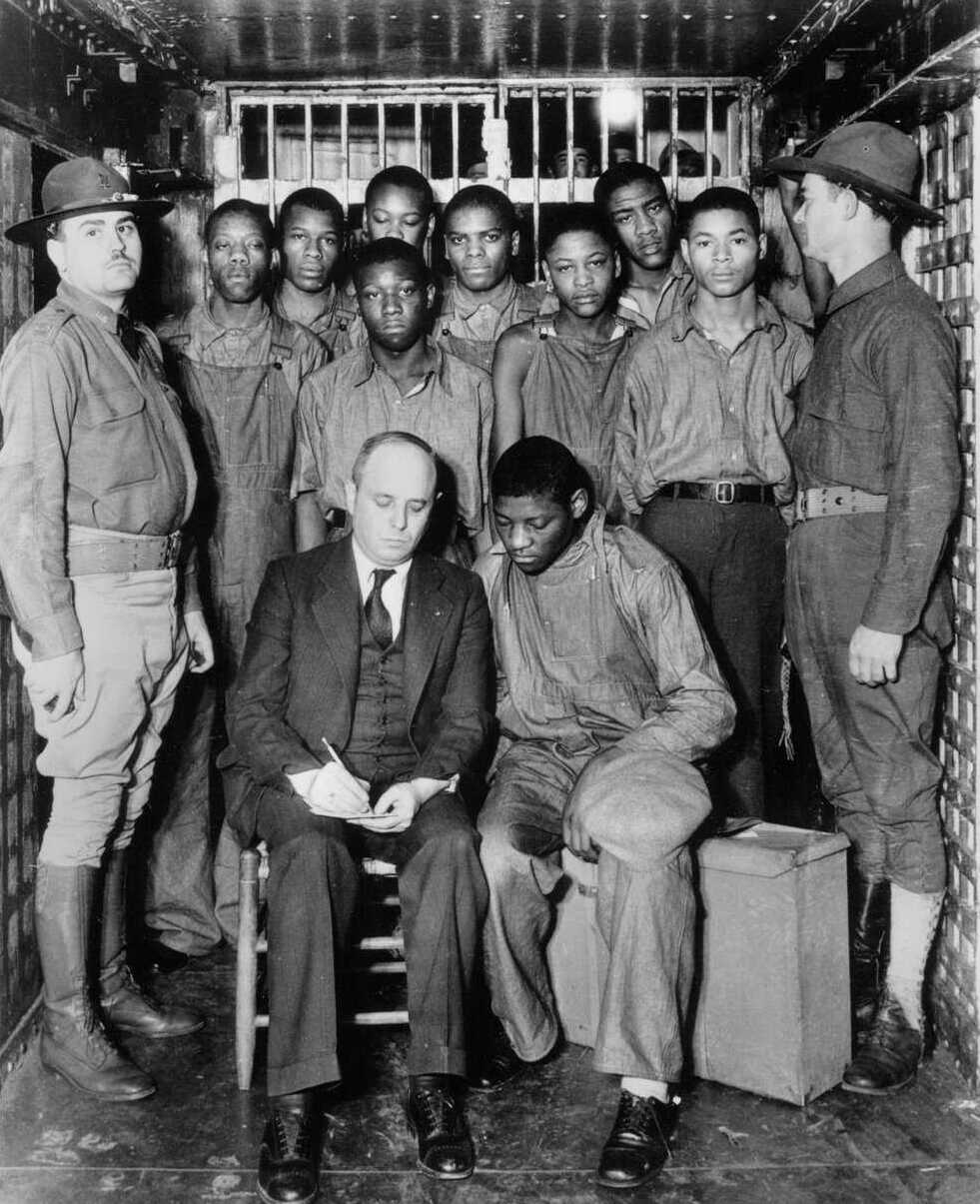
The Scottsboro Boys with Leibowitz

When the case, by now a cause celebre, came back to Judge Hawkins, he granted the request for a change of venue. The defense had urged for a move to the city of Birmingham, Alabama, but the case was transferred to the small, rural community of Decatur. This was near homes of the alleged victims and in Ku Klux Klan (KKK) territory.

The Communist Party USA (CPUSA) maintained control over the defense of the case, retaining the New York criminal defense attorney Samuel Leibowitz. He had never lost a murder trial and was a registered Democrat, with no connection to the Communist Party. They kept Joseph Brodsky as the second chair for the trial.

The case was assigned to District Judge James Edwin Horton and tried in Morgan County. His appointment to the case drew local praise. Nevertheless, the judge carried a loaded pistol in his car throughout the time he presided over these cases.

The two years that had passed since the first trials had not dampened community hostility for the Scottsboro Boys. But others believed they were victims of Jim Crow justice, and the case was covered by numerous national newspapers.

At the trial, some 100 reporters were seated at the press tables. Hundreds more gathered on the courthouse lawn. National Guard members in plain clothes mingled in the crowd, looking for any sign of trouble. The Sheriff's department brought the defendants to Court in a patrol wagon guarded by two carloads of deputies armed with shotguns.

In the courtroom, the Scottsboro Boys sat in a row wearing blue prison denims and guarded by National Guardsmen, except for Roy Wright, who had not been convicted. Wright wore street clothes. The Birmingham News described him as "dressed up like a Georgia gigolo."

Leibowitz asserted his trust in the "God-fearing people of Decatur and Morgan County"; he made a pretrial motion to quash the indictment on the ground that blacks had been systematically excluded from the grand jury. Although the motion was denied, this got the issue in the record for future appeals. To this motion, Attorney General Thomas Knight responded, "The State will concede nothing. Put on your case."

Leibowitz called the editor of the Scottsboro weekly newspaper, who testified that he'd never heard of a black juror in Decatur because "they all steal." He called local jury commissioners to explain the absence of African Americans from Jackson County juries. When Leibowitz accused them of excluding black men from juries, they did not seem to understand his accusation. It was as if the exclusion was so ordinary as to be unconscious. (Most blacks could not vote after having been disenfranchised by the Alabama Constitution of 1901. Since jurors were limited to voters, the local jury commissioners would not consider blacks for potential jurors.)

Leibowitz called local black professionals as witnesses to show they were qualified for jury service. Leibowitz called John Sanford, an African American of Scottsboro, who was educated, well-spoken, and respected. The defense attorney showed that "Mr. Sanford" was evidently qualified in all manner except by virtue of his race to be a candidate for participation in a jury. During the following cross-examination, Knight addressed the witness by his first name, "John." The first two times that he did so, Leibowitz asked the court to have him alter his behavior. He did not, and this insult eventually caused Leibowitz to leap to his feet saying, "Now listen, Mr. Attorney-General, I've warned you twice about your treatment of my witness. For the last time now, stand back, take your finger out of his eye, and call him mister", causing gasps from the public seated in the gallery. The judge abruptly interrupted Leibowitz.

While the pretrial motion to quash the indictment was denied, Leibowitz had positioned the case for appeal. The issue of the composition of the jury was addressed in a second landmark decision by the U.S. Supreme Court, which ruled that race could not be used to exclude anyone from candidacy for participation on a jury anywhere in the United States. This astonished (and infuriated) many white residents of Alabama and many other Southern states.

=== Patterson trial ===
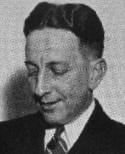
Attorney General Thomas Knight Jr.

Judge Horton called the first case against Haywood Patterson and began jury selection. Leibowitz objected that African American jurors had been excluded from the jury pool. He called the jury commissioner to the stand, asking if there were any blacks on the juror rolls, and when told yes, suggested his answer was not honest. The locals resented his questioning of the official and "chewed their tobacco meditatively." The National Guard posted five men with fixed bayonets in front of Leibowitz's residence that night. The jury was selected by the end of the day on Friday and sequestered in the Lyons Hotel.

A large crowd gathered outside the courthouse for the start of the Patterson trial on Monday, April 2. Without the "vivid detail" she had used in the Scottsboro trials, Victoria Price told her account in 16 minutes. The defense had what she had said before under oath on paper, and could confront her with any inconsistencies. The only drama came when Knight pulled a torn pair of step-ins from his briefcase and tossed them into the lap of a juror to support the claim of rape.

Leibowitz used a 32-foot model train set up on a table in front of the witness stand to illustrate where each of the parties was during the alleged events, and other points of his defense. When asked if the model in front of her was like the train where she claimed she was raped, Price cracked, "It was bigger. Lots bigger. That is a toy." Leibowitz later conceded that Price was "one of the toughest witnesses he ever cross examined." Her answers were evasive and derisive. She often replied, "I can't remember" or "I won't say." Once when Leibowitz confronted her with a contradiction in her testimony, she exclaimed, sticking a finger in the direction of defendant Patterson, "One thing I will never forget is that one sitting right there raped me." The attorney tried to question her about a conviction for fornication and adultery in Huntsville, but the court sustained a prosecution objection.

Price insisted that she had spent the evening before the alleged rape at the home of Mrs. Callie Brochie in Chattanooga. Leibowitz asked her whether she had spent the evening in a "hobo jungle" in Huntsville, Alabama, with a Lester Carter and Jack Tiller, but she denied it. Leibowitz said that Callie Brochie was a fictional character in a Saturday Evening Post short story and suggested that Price's stay with her had been equally fictional.

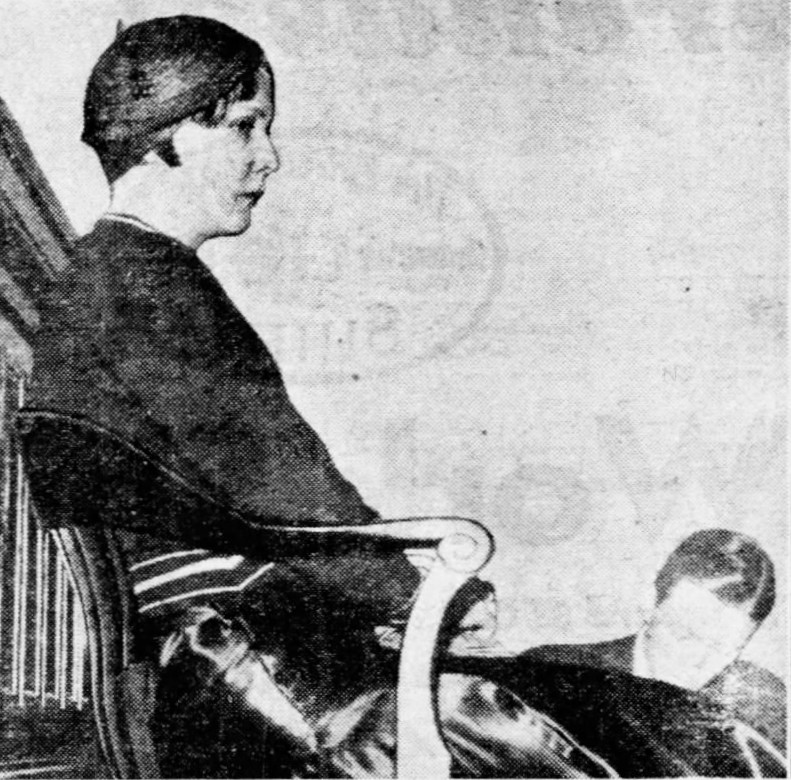
Victoria Price responded on cross-examination at the trial: "You're a pretty good actor yourself, Mr. Leibowitz"

As the historian James Goodman wrote:

Price was not the first hardened witness [Leibowitz] had faced, and certainly not the most depraved. Nor was she the first witness who tried to stare him down and, failing that, who seemed as if she were about to leap out of her seat and strike him. She was not the first witness to be evasive, sarcastic and crude. She was, however, the first witness to use her bad memory, truculence, and total lack of refinement, and at times, even ignorance, to great advantage.

Many of the whites in the courtroom likely resented Leibowitz as a Jew from New York hired by the Communists, and for his treatment of a southern white woman, even a low-class one, as a hostile witness. Some wondered if there was any way he could leave Decatur alive. The National Guard Captain Joe Burelson promised Judge Horton that he would protect Leibowitz and the defendants "as long as we have a piece of ammunition or a man alive." Once Captain Burelson learned that a group was on their way to "take care of Leibowitz", he raised the drawbridge across the Tennessee River, keeping them out of Decatur.

Judge Horton learned that the prisoners were in danger from locals. Once he sent out the jury and warned the courtroom, "I want it to be known that these prisoners are under the protection of this court. This court intends to protect these prisoners and any other persons engaged in this trial." Threats of violence came from the North as well. One letter from Chicago read, "When those Boys are dead, within six months your state will lose 500 lives."

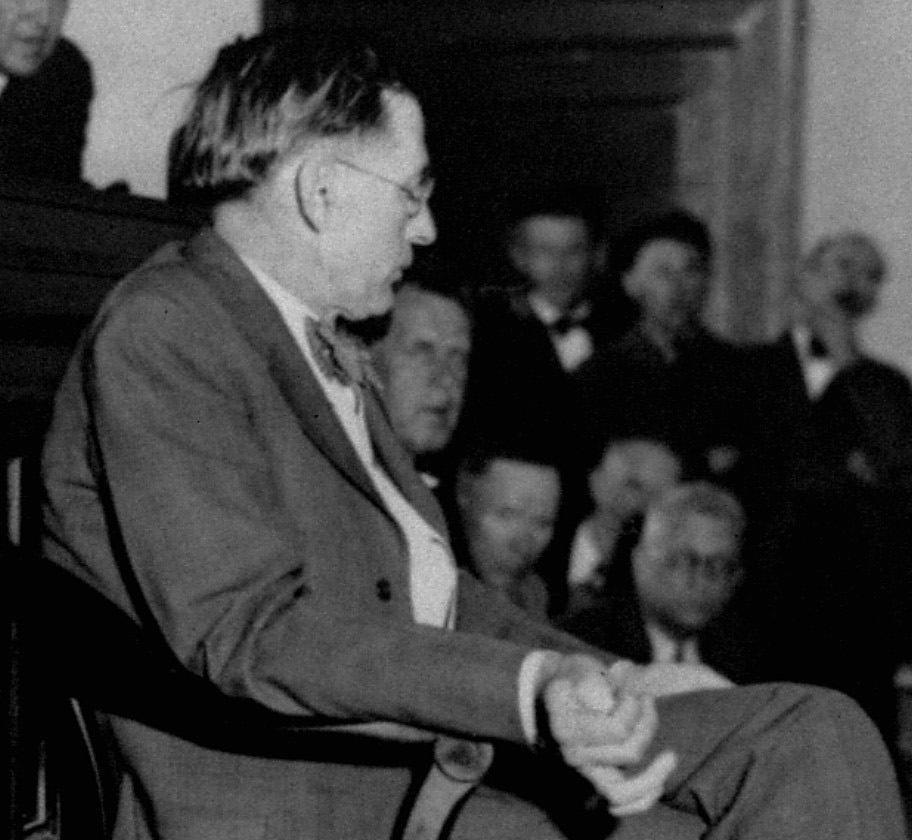
Dr. R. R. Bridges testifying in Decatur

Leibowitz systematically dismantled each prosecution witness' story under cross-examination. He got Dr. Bridges to admit on cross-examination that "the best you can say about the whole case is that both of these women showed they had sexual intercourse." Paint Rock ticket agent W. H. Hill testified to seeing the women and the black youths in the same car, but on cross-examination admitted to not seeing the women at all until they got off the train. Posse member Tom Rousseau claimed to have seen the women and youths get off the same car but under cross-examination admitted finding the defendants scattered in various cars at the front of the train. Lee Adams testified that he had seen the fight, but later saying that he was a quarter-mile from the tracks. Ory Dobbins repeated that he'd seen the women try to jump off the train, but Leibowitz showed photos of the positions of the parties that proved Dobbins could not have seen everything he claimed. Dobbins insisted he had seen the girls wearing women's clothing, but other witnesses had testified they were in overalls.

The prosecution withdrew the testimony of Dr. Marvin Lynch, the other examining doctor, as "repetitive." Many years later, Judge Horton said that Dr. Lynch confided that the women had not been raped and had laughed when he examined them. He said that if he testified for the defense, his practice in Jackson County would be over. Thinking Patterson would be acquitted, Judge Horton did not force Dr. Lynch to testify, but the judge had become convinced the defendants were innocent.

==== Defense ====
Leibowitz began his defense by calling Chattanooga resident Dallas Ramsey, who testified that his home was next to the hobo jungle mentioned earlier. He said that he had seen both Price and Bates get on a train there with a white man on the morning of the alleged rape.

Train fireman Percy Ricks testified that he saw the two women slipping along the side of the train right after it stopped in Paint Rock, as if they were trying to escape the posse. Leibowitz put on the testimony of Chattanooga gynecologist, Dr. Edward A. Reisman, who testified that after a woman had been raped by six men, it was impossible that she would have only a trace of semen, as was found in this case.

Leibowitz next called Lester Carter, a white man who testified that he had had intercourse with Bates. Jack Tiller, another white, said he had had sex with Price, two days before the alleged rapes. He testified that he had been on the train on the morning of the arrests. He had heard Price ask Orville Gilley, a white youth, to confirm that she had been raped. However, Gilley had told her to "go to hell." Morgan County Solicitor Wade Wright cross-examined Carter. Wright tried to get Carter to admit that the Communist Party had bought his testimony, which Carter denied. But he said that the defense attorney Joseph Brodsky had paid his rent and bought him a new suit for the trial.

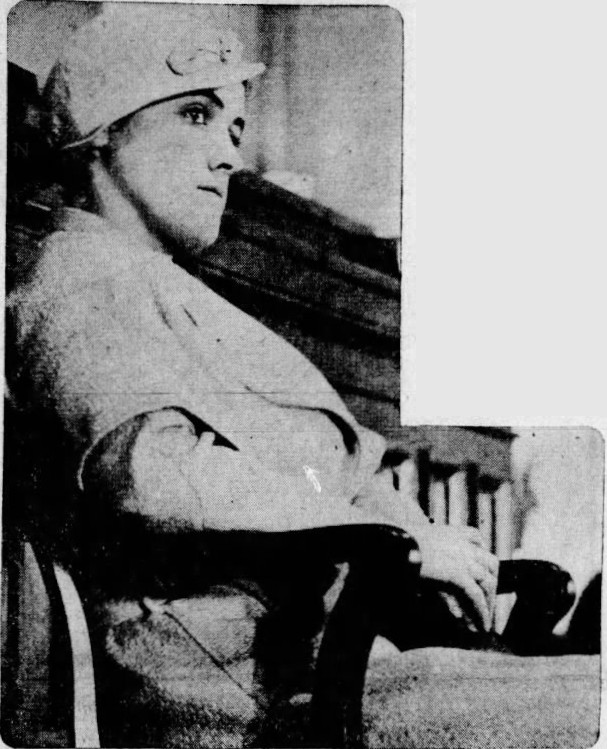
Ruby Bates testifying

Five of the original nine Scottsboro defendants testified that they had not seen Price or Bates until after the train stopped in Paint Rock. Willie Roberson testified that he was suffering from syphilis, with sores that prevented him from walking, and that he was in a car at the back of the train.

Olen Montgomery testified that he had been alone on a tank car the entire trip, and had not known about the fight or alleged rapes. Ozie Powell said that while he was not a participant, he had seen the fight with the white teenagers from his vantage point between a boxcar and a gondola car, where he had been hanging on. He said he saw the white teenagers jump off the train. Roberson, Montgomery, and Powell all denied they had known each other or the other defendants before that day. Andy Wright, Eugene Williams, and Haywood Patterson testified that they had previously known each other, but had not seen the women until the train stopped in Paint Rock. Knight questioned them extensively about instances in which their testimony supposedly differed from their testimony at their trial in Scottsboro. They did not contradict themselves in any meaningful way.

Haywood Patterson testified on his own behalf that he had not seen the women before stopping in Paint Rock; he withstood a cross-examination from Knight who "shouted, shook his finger at, and ran back and forth in front of the defendant." At one point, Knight demanded, "You were tried at Scottsboro?" Patterson snapped, "I was framed at Scottsboro." Knight thundered, "Who told you to say that?" Patterson replied, "I told myself to say it."

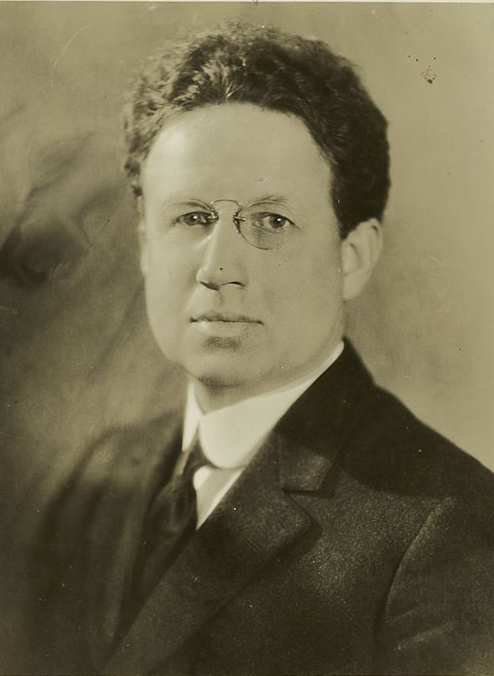
Reverend Harry Emerson Fosdick

Just after the defense rested "with reservations", someone handed Leibowitz a note. The attorneys approached the bench for a hushed conversation, which was followed by a short recess. Leibowitz called one final witness. Thus far in the trial, Ruby Bates had been notably absent. She had disappeared from her home in Huntsville weeks before the new trial, and every sheriff in Alabama had been ordered to search for her, to no avail. Now, two guardsmen with bayonets opened the courtroom doors, and Bates entered, "in stylish clothes, eyes downcast."

Her dramatic and unexpected entrance drew stares from the residents of the courtroom. Victoria Price, brought out for Bates to identify, glared at her. Attorney General Knight warned Price to "keep your temper." Bates proceeded to testify and explained that no rape had occurred. She said none of the defendants had touched her or even spoken to her. When asked if she had been raped on March 25, 1931, Bates said, "No sir." When asked why she had initially said she had been raped, Bates replied, "I told it just like Victoria did because she said we might have to stay in jail if we did not frame up a story after crossing a state line with men." Bates explained that Price had said, "she didn't care if all the Negroes in Alabama were put in jail." This recantation seemed to be a severe blow to the prosecution.

Bates admitted having intercourse with Lester Carter in the Huntsville railway yards two days before making accusations. Finally, she testified she had been in New York City and had decided to return to Alabama to tell the truth, at the urging of Reverend Harry Emerson Fosdick of that city.

=== Closing arguments ===
By the time Leibowitz closed, the prosecution had employed antisemitic remarks to discredit him. Wade Wright added to this, referring to Ruby's boyfriend Lester Carter as "Mr. Caterinsky" and called him "the prettiest Jew" he ever saw. He said, "Don't you know these defense witnesses are bought and paid for? May the Lord have mercy on the soul of Ruby Bates. Now the question in this case is this—Is justice in the case going to be bought and sold in Alabama with Jew money from New York?"

Leibowitz objected and moved for a new trial. Judge Horton refused to grant a new trial, telling the jury to "put [the remarks] out of your minds." One author describes Wright's closing argument as "the now-famous Jew-baiting summary to the jury." He goes on to say that, "Until Wright spoke, many of the newspapermen felt that there was an outside chance for acquittal, at least a hung jury. But ... from then on the defense was helpless."

In his closing, Leibowitz called Wright's argument an appeal to regional bigotry, claiming talk about Communists was just to "befuddle" the jury. He described himself as a patriot, a "Roosevelt Democrat", who had served the "Stars and Stripes" in World War I, "when there was no talk of Jew or Gentile, white or black." As to Wright's reference to "Jew money", Leibowitz said that he was defending the Scottsboro Boys for nothing and was personally paying the expenses of his wife, who had accompanied him.

"I'm interested", Leibowitz argued, "solely in seeing that that poor, moronic colored boy over there and his co-defendants in the other cases get a square shake of the dice, because I believe, before God, they are the victims of a dastardly frame-up." He called Price's testimony "a foul, contemptible, outrageous lie." He ended with the Lord's Prayer and a challenge to either acquit or render the death sentence—nothing in between.

Attorney General Knight delivered his rebuttal, roaring that if the jury found Haywood not guilty, they ought to "put a garland of roses around his neck, give him a supper, and send him to New York City." Considering the evidence, he continued, "there can be but one verdict—death in the electric chair for raping Victoria Price."

=== Verdict ===
The jury began deliberating Saturday afternoon and announced it had a verdict at ten the next morning, while many residents of Decatur were in church. The jury foreman, Eugene Bailey, handed the handwritten verdict to Judge Horton. The jury found the defendant guilty of rape and sentenced Patterson to death in the electric chair. Bailey had held out for eleven hours for life in prison, but in the end, agreed to the death sentence.

According to one account, juror Irwin Craig held out against the imposition of the death penalty, because he thought that Patterson was innocent.

==== Irwin Craig ====
Irwin "Red" Craig (died 1970) (nicknamed from the color of his hair) was the sole juror to refuse to impose the death penalty in the retrial of Haywood Patterson, one of the Scottsboro Boys, in what was then the small town of Decatur, Alabama. His son, Sonny, later recalled him as saying: "Those young men were innocent; everybody knew that but they were going to be punished for what they didn't do." The KKK staked a burning cross in his family yard.

He was called in to see the judge presiding over that retrial, James Horton, who exhorted him to change his vote to guilty. "If you don't, they will kill you, Red," said the judge. Craig protested: "I can't change my vote, judge." Horton replied: "Don't worry about that, I'll take care of it."

=== Horton grants Patterson a new trial ===
The defense moved for a retrial and, believing the defendants innocent, Judge James Edwin Horton agreed to set aside the guilty verdict for Patterson. Horton ruled the rest of defendants could not get a fair trial at that time and indefinitely postponed the rest of the trials, knowing it would cost him his job when he ran for re-election.

Judge Horton heard arguments on the motion for a new trial in the Limestone County Court House in Athens, Alabama, where he read his decision to the astonished defense and a furious Knight:

These women are shown ... to have falsely accused two Negroes ... This tendency on the part of the women shows that they are predisposed to make false accusations ... The Court will not pursue the evidence any further.

Horton ordered a new trial, which would turn out to be the third for Patterson. When Horton announced his decision, Knight stated that he would retry Patterson. He said that he had found Orville "Carolina Slim" Gilley, the white teenager in the gondola car and that Gilley would corroborate Price's story in full. At Knight's request, the court replaced Judge Horton with Judge William Washington Callahan, described as a racist. He later instructed the jury in the next round of trials that no white woman would voluntarily have sex with a black man.

=== New trials under Callahan ===
During the Decatur retrial, held from November 1933 to July 1937, Judge Callahan wanted to take the case off "the front pages of America's newspapers." He banned photographers from the courthouse grounds and typewriters from his courtroom. "There ain't going to be no more picture snappin' round here," he ordered. He also imposed a strict three-day time limit on each trial, running them into the evening. He removed protection from the defense, convincing Governor Benjamin Meek Miller to keep the National Guard away.

The defense moved for another change of venue, submitting affidavits in which hundreds of residents stated their intense dislike for the defendants, to show there was "overwhelming prejudice" against them. The prosecution countered with testimony that some of the quotes in the affidavits were untrue and that six of the people quoted were dead. The defense countered that they had received numerous death threats, and the judge replied that he and the prosecution had received more from the communists. The motion was denied.

Leibowitz led Commissioner Moody and Jackson County Circuit Clerk C. A. Wann through every page of the Jackson County jury roll to show that it contained no names of African Americans. When, after several hours of reading names, Commissioner Moody finally claimed several names to be of African Americans, Leibowitz got handwriting samples from all present. One man admitted that the handwriting appeared to be his. Leibowitz called in a handwriting expert, who testified that names identified as African American had been added later to the list, and signed by former Jury Commissioner Morgan.

Judge Callahan did not rule that excluding people by race was constitutional, only that the defendant had not proven that African Americans had been deliberately excluded. By letting Leibowitz go on record on this issue, Judge Callahan provided grounds for the case to be appealed to the U.S. Supreme Court for a second time. It was the basis for the court's finding in Norris v. Alabama (1935), that exclusion of African American grand jurors had occurred, violating the due process clause of the Constitution.

Haywood Patterson's Decatur retrial began on November 27, 1933. Thirty-six potential jurors admitted having a "fixed opinion" in the case, which caused Leibowitz to move for a change of venue. Callahan denied the motion. Callahan excluded defense evidence that Horton had admitted, at one point exclaiming to Leibowitz, "Judge Horton can't help you [now]." He routinely sustained prosecution objections but overruled defense objections.

Price testified again that a dozen armed negro men entered the gondola car. She said Patterson had fired a shot and ordered all whites but Gilley off the train. She said the negros had ripped her clothes off and repeatedly raped her at knifepoint, and pointed out Patterson as one of the rapists. She said they raped her and Bates, afterward saying they would take them north or throw them in the river. She testified that she had fallen while getting out of the gondola car, passed out, and came to seated in a store at Paint Rock. Leibowitz questioned her until Judge Callahan stopped court for the day at 6:30. When he resumed the next morning, he pointed out many contradictions among her various versions of the rape.

Judge Callahan repeatedly interrupted Leibowitz's cross-examination of Price, calling defense questions "arguing with the witness", "immaterial", "useless", "a waste of time", and even "illegal". The many contradictions notwithstanding, Price steadfastly stuck to her testimony that Patterson had raped her.

Orville Gilley's testimony at Patterson's Decatur retrial was a mild sensation. He denied being a "bought witness", repeating his testimony about armed blacks ordering the white teenagers off the train. He confirmed Price's rape account, adding that he stopped the rape by convincing the "negro" with the gun to make the rapists stop "before they killed that woman." Leibowitz cross-examined him at length about contradictions between his account and Price's testimony, but he remained "unruffled." Gilley testified to meeting Lester Carter and the women the evening before the alleged rapes and getting them coffee and sandwiches. Callahan interrupted before Leibowitz could find out if Gilley went "somewhere with [the women]" that night.

The prosecution called several white farmers who testified that they had seen the fight on the train and saw the girls "a-fixin' to get out", but they saw the defendants drag them back.

Lester Carter took the stand for the defense. He had testified in the first Decatur trial that Price and Bates had had sex with him and Gilley in the hobo jungle in Chattanooga prior to the alleged rapes, which could account for the semen found in the women. However, Judge Callahan would not let him repeat that testimony at the trial, stating that any such testimony was "immaterial".

Ruby Bates was apparently too sick to travel. She had had surgery in New York, and at one point Leibowitz requested that her deposition be taken as a dying declaration. While she was not dying, committed to his three-day time limit for the trial, Judge Callahan denied the request to arrange to take her deposition. Although the defense needed her testimony, by the time a deposition arrived, the case had gone to the jury and they did not hear it at all.

Haywood Patterson took the stand, admitting he had "cussed" at the white teenagers, but only because they cussed at him first. He denied seeing the white women before Paint Rock. On cross-examination Knight confronted him with previous testimony from his Scottsboro trial that he had not touched the women, but that he had seen the other five defendants rape them. Leibowitz objected, stating that the U.S. Supreme Court had ruled previous testimony illegal. Judge Callahan allowed it, although he would not allow testimony by Patterson stating that he had not seen the women before Paint Rock. Patterson explained contradictions in his testimony: "We was scared and I don't know what I said. They told us if we didn't confess they'd kill us—give us to the mob outside."

Patterson claimed the threats had been made by guards and militiamen while the defendants were in the Jackson County jail. He said threats were made even in the presence of the judge. Patterson pointed at H.G. Bailey, the prosecutor in his Scottsboro trial, stating, "And Mr. Bailey over there—he said send all the niggers to the electric chair. There's too many niggers in the world anyway."

Closing arguments were made November 29 through November 30, without stopping for Thanksgiving. Callahan limited each side to two hours of argument.

Knight declared in his closing that the prosecution was not avenging what the defendants had done to Price. "What has been done to her cannot be undone. What you can do now is to make sure that it doesn't happen to some other woman." Leibowitz objected that the argument was "an appeal to passion and prejudice" and moved for a mistrial. Knight agreed that it was an appeal to passion, and Callahan overruled the motion. Knight continued: "We all have a passion, all men in this courtroom to protect the womanhood in Alabama." For his summation, solicitor Wade Wright reviewed the testimony and warned the jury, "that this crime could have happened to any woman, even though she was riding in a parlor car, instead of the boxcar."

Solicitor H. G. Bailey reminded the jury that the law presumed Patterson innocent, even if what Gilley and Price had described was "as sordid as ever a human tongue has uttered." Finally, he defended the women, "Instead of painting their faces ... they were brave enough to go to Chattanooga and look for honest work." Bailey attacked the defense case:

They say this is a frame-up! They have been yelling frame-up ever since this case started! Who framed them? Did Ory Dobbins frame them? Did brother Hill frame them? We did a lot of awful things over there in Scottsboro, didn't we? My, my, my. And now they come over here and try to convince you that that sort of thing happened in your neighboring county.

Judge Callahan charged the jury that Price and Bates could have been raped without force, just by withholding their consent. He instructed them, "Where the woman charged to have been raped is white, there is a strong presumption under the law that she will not and did not yield voluntarily to intercourse with the defendant, a Negro." He instructed the jury that if Patterson was so much as present for the "purpose of aiding, encouraging, assisting or abetting" the rapes "in any way", he was as guilty as the person who committed the rapes.

He told them that they did not need to find corroboration of Price's testimony. If they believed her, that was enough to convict. Judge Callahan said he was giving them two forms – one for conviction and one for acquittal, but he supplied the jury with only a form to convict. He supplied them with an acquittal form only after the prosecution, fearing reversible error, urged him to do so.

As Time described it: "Twenty-six hours later came a resounding thump on the brown wooden jury room door. The bailiff let the jurors out [from the Patterson trial]. The foreman unfisted a moist crumpled note, handed it to the clerk. A thin smile faded from Patterson's lips as the clerk read his third death sentence."

In May 1934, despite having run unopposed in the previous election for the position, James Horton was soundly defeated when he ran for re-election as a circuit judge. The vote against him was especially heavy in Morgan County. In the same election, Thomas Knight was elected Lieutenant Governor of Alabama.

=== Norris's retrial ===
Judge Callahan started jury selection for the trial of defendant Norris on November 30, 1933, Thanksgiving afternoon. At this trial, Victoria Price testified that two of her alleged assailants had pistols, that they threw off the white teenagers, that she tried to jump off but was grabbed, thrown onto the gravel in the gondola, one of them held her legs, and one held a knife on her, and one raped both her and Ruby Bates. She claimed Norris raped her, along with five others.

Callahan would not allow Leibowitz to ask Price about any "crime of moral turpitude." Nor would he allow Leibowitz to ask why she went to Chattanooga, where she had spent the night there, or about Carter or Gilley. Neither would he allow questions as to whether she'd had sexual intercourse with Carter or Gilley. During more cross-examination, Price looked at Knight so often Leibowitz accused her of looking for signals. Judge Callahan cautioned Leibowitz he would not permit "such tactics" in his courtroom.

Dr. Bridges was a state witness, and Leibowitz cross-examined him at length, trying to get him to agree that a rape would have produced more injuries than he found. Callahan sustained a prosecution objection, ruling "the question is not based on the evidence."

Ruby Bates had given a deposition from her hospital bed in New York, which arrived in time to be read to the jury in the Norris trial. Judge Callahan sustained prosecution objections to large portions of it, most significantly the part where she said that she and Price both had sex voluntarily in Chattanooga the night before the alleged rapes.

Leibowitz read the rest of Bates' deposition, including her version of what happened on the train. She said that there were white teenagers riding in the gondola car with them, that some black teenagers came into the car, that a fight broke out, that most of the white teenagers got off the train, and that the blacks "disappeared" until the posse stopped the train at Paint Rock. She testified that she, Price and Gilley were arrested and that Price made the rape accusation, instructing her to go along with the story to stay out of jail. She reiterated that neither she nor Price had been raped. Leibowitz chose to keep Norris off the stand.

Closing arguments were on December 4, 1933. In his closing argument, Leibowitz called the prosecution's case "a contemptible frame-up by two bums." He attempted to overcome local prejudice, saying "if you have a reasonable doubt, hold out. Stand your ground, show you are a man, a red-blooded he-man." The prosecution's closing argument was shorter and less "barbed" than it had been in the Patterson case. It was addressed more to the evidence and less to the regional prejudice of the jury.

Leibowitz made many objections to Judge Callahan's charge to the jury. The New York Times described Leibowitz as "pressing the judge almost as though he were a hostile witness." New York City Mayor Fiorello H. La Guardia had dispatched two burly New York City police officers to protect Leibowitz. During the long jury deliberations, Judge Callahan also assigned two Morgan County deputies to guard him.

The jury began deliberation on December 5. After 14 hours of deliberation, the jury filed into the courtroom; they returned a guilty verdict and sentenced Norris to death. Norris took the news stoically.

Leibowitz's prompt appeal stayed the execution date, so Patterson and Norris were both returned to death row in Kilby Prison. The other defendants waited in the Jefferson County jail in Birmingham for the outcome of the appeals. Leibowitz was escorted to the train station under heavy guard, and he boarded a train back to New York.

=== United States Supreme Court reverses Decatur convictions ===
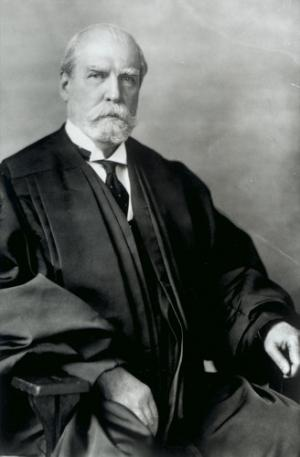
Chief Justice Charles Evans Hughes

The case went to the United States Supreme Court for a second time as Norris v. Alabama. The court reversed the convictions for a second time on the basis that blacks had been excluded from the jury pool because of their race.

Attorneys Samuel Leibowitz, Walter H. Pollak, and Osmond Frankel argued the case from February 15 to 18, 1935. Leibowitz showed the justices that the names of African Americans had been added to the jury rolls. The Justices examined the items closely with a magnifying glass. Thomas Knight maintained that the jury process was color blind.

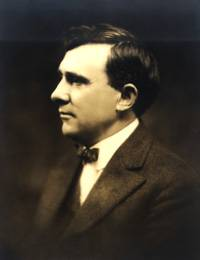
Alabama Governor Bibb Graves

Because the case of Haywood Patterson had been dismissed due to the technical failure to appeal it on time, it presented different issues. Attorneys Osmond Frankel and Walter Pollak argued those.

On April 1, 1935, the United States Supreme Court sent the cases back a second time for retrials in Alabama. Writing for the Court, Chief Justice Charles Evans Hughes observed the Equal Protection Clause of the United States Constitution clearly forbade the states from excluding citizens from juries due solely to their race. He noted that the Court had inspected the jury rolls, chastising Judge Callahan and the Alabama Supreme Court for accepting assertions that black citizens had not been excluded. According to the U.S. Supreme Court, "something more" was needed. The Court concluded, "the motion to quash ... should have been granted." The Court ruled that it would be a great injustice to execute Patterson when Norris would receive a new trial, reasoning that Alabama should have opportunity to reexamine Patterson's case as well.

Alabama Governor Bibb Graves instructed every solicitor and judge in the state, "Whether we like the decisions or not ... We must put Negroes in jury boxes. Alabama is going to observe the supreme law of America."

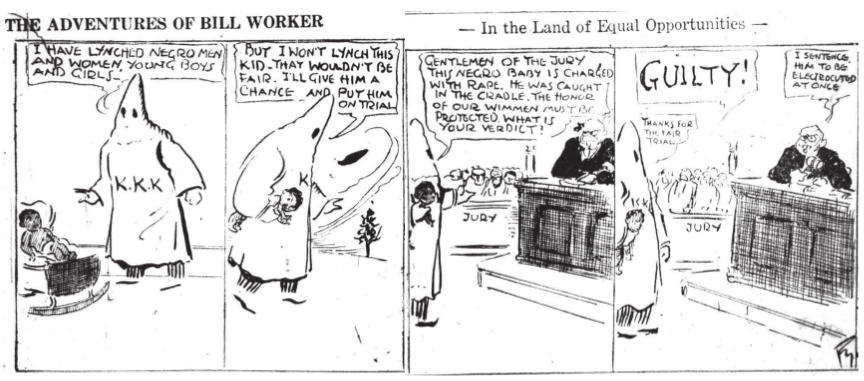
In this Ryan Walker editorial cartoon – published four days after the conclusion of the Scottsboro trial – a member of the Ku Klux Klan seizes a black baby from a cradle and charges him with rape. The jury immediately convicts the baby, and the judge immediately sentences him to death; the Klansman emphasizes that this has been a fair trial, and is preferable to a lynching.

=== Final round of trials ===
After the case was remanded, on May 1, 1935, Victoria Price swore new rape complaints against the defendants as the sole complaining witness. An African American, Creed Conyer, was selected as the first black person since Reconstruction to sit on an Alabama grand jury. The indictment could be made with a two-thirds vote, and the grand jury voted to indict the defendants. Thomas Knight, Jr. by now (May 1935) Lieutenant Governor, was appointed a special prosecutor to the cases.

Leibowitz recognized that he was viewed by Southerners as an outsider, and allowed the local attorney Charles Watts to be the lead attorney; he assisted from the sidelines. Judge Callahan arraigned all the defendants except the two juveniles in Decatur; they all pleaded not guilty.

Watts moved to have the case sent to the Federal Court as a civil rights case, which Callahan promptly denied. He set the retrials for January 20, 1936.

=== Final decisions ===
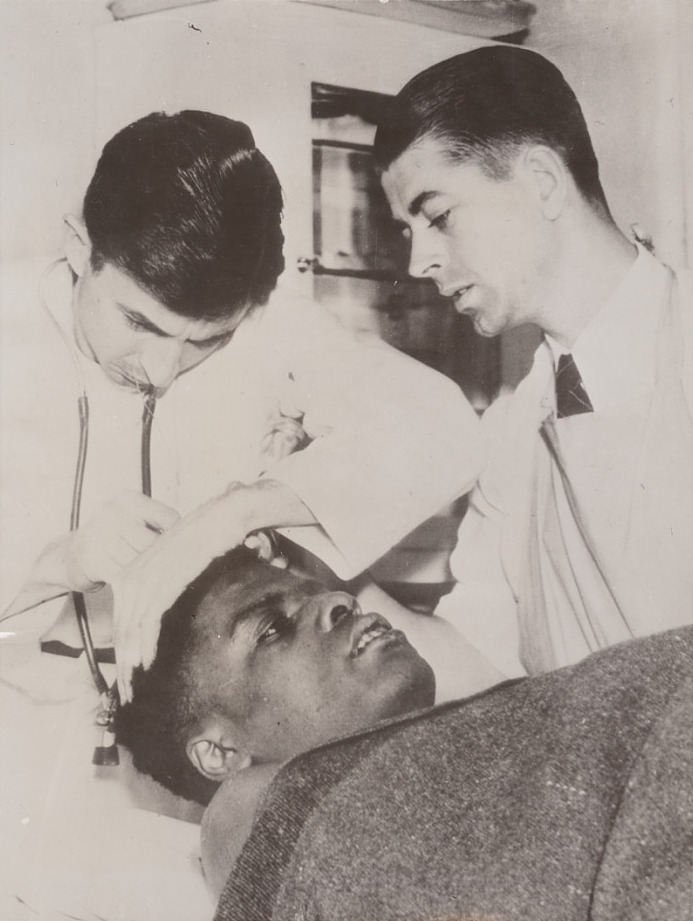
Ozie Powell in the hospital

By January 23, 1936, Haywood Patterson was convicted of rape and sentenced to 75 years.

In May 1937, Thomas Knight died.

On July 15, 1937, Clarence Norris was convicted of rape and sentenced to death.

On July 22, 1937, Andrew Wright was convicted of rape and sentenced to 99 years.

On July 24, 1937, Charlie Weems was convicted of rape and sentenced to 75 years in prison.

On July 24, 1937, Ozie Powell was taken into court and the new prosecutor, Thomas Lawson, announced that the state was dropping rape charges against Powell and that he was pleading guilty to assaulting a deputy. He was sentenced to 20 years. The state dropped the rape charges as part of this plea bargain.

On July 24, 1937, the state of Alabama dropped all charges against Willie Roberson, Olen Montgomery, Eugene Williams, and Roy Wright. The four had spent over six years in prison on death row, as "adults" despite their ages. Thomas Lawson announced that all charges were being dropped against the remaining four defendants: He said that after "careful consideration" every prosecutor was "convinced" that Roberson and Montgomery were "not guilty." Wright and Williams, regardless of their guilt or innocence, were 14 and 13 at the time and, in view of the jail time they had already served, justice required that they also be released.

On July 26, 1937, Haywood Patterson was sent to Atmore State Prison Farm. The remaining "Scottsboro Boys" in custody, Norris, A Wright and Weems were at this time in Kilby Prison.

== Aftermath ==
Governor Graves never planned to pardon the prisoners in 1938 and was angered by their hostility and refusal to admit their guilt. He refused the pardons but did commute Norris's death sentence to life in prison.

Ruby Bates toured for a short while as an ILD speaker. She said she was "sorry for all the trouble that I caused them", and claimed she did it because she was "frightened by the ruling class of Scottsboro." Later, she worked in a New York state spinning factory until 1938; that year she returned to Huntsville. Victoria Price worked in a Huntsville cotton mill until 1938, then moved to Flintville, Tennessee. Victoria Price never recanted her testimony.

Scottsboro: A Tragedy of the American South (1969) by Dan T. Carter was widely thought to be authoritative, but it wrongly asserted that Price and Bates were dead. An NBC TV movie, Judge Horton and the Scottsboro Boys (1976), asserted that the defense had proven that Price and Bates were prostitutes; both sued NBC over their portrayals. Bates died in 1976 in Washington State, where she lived with her carpenter husband, and her case was not heard. Price's case was initially dismissed but she appealed. When the U.S. Supreme Court agreed to hear the case in 1977, Price disregarded the advice of her lawyer and accepted a settlement from NBC. She used the money to buy a house. Price died in 1982, in Lincoln County, Tennessee.

Most residents of Scottsboro have acknowledged the injustice that started in their community. In January 2004, the town dedicated a historical marker in commemoration of the case at the Jackson County Court House. According to a news story, "An 87-year-old black man who attended the ceremony recalled that the mob scene following the Boys' arrest was frightening and that death threats were leveled against the jailed suspects. Speaking of the decision to install the marker, he said, 'I think it will bring the races closer together, to understand each other better."

Sheila Washington founded the Scottsboro Boys Museum & Cultural Center in 2010 in Scottsboro. It is located in the former Joyce Chapel United Methodist Church and is devoted to exploring the case and commemorating the search for justice for its victims.

=== 2013 pardon ===
In early May 2013, the Alabama legislature cleared the path for posthumous pardons. On November 21, 2013, the Alabama Board of Pardons and Paroles granted posthumous pardons to Weems, Wright and Patterson, the only Scottsboro Boys who had neither had their convictions overturned nor received a pardon.

Governor Robert J. Bentley

While we could not take back what happened to the Scottsboro Boys 80 years ago, we found a way to make it right moving forward. The pardons granted to the Scottsboro Boys today are long overdue. The legislation that led to today's pardons was the result of a bipartisan, cooperative effort. I appreciate the Pardons and Parole Board for continuing our progress today and officially granting these pardons. Today, the Scottsboro Boys have finally received justice.

=== The Scottsboro Boys Museum ===
In 2010, a museum was opened to commemorate the injustices that these nine boys faced. This museum is called "The Scottsboro Boys Museum" and is located in Joyce Chapel, which is considered a historical site, in Scottsboro, Alabama. This museum offers a unique experience into the 1931 incident involving the nine boys and the subsequent events that followed.

Their mission states:

"The Scottsboro Boys Museum commemorates the lives and legacy of nine young African Americans who, in the 1930s, became international symbols of race-based injustice in the American South, and celebrates the positive actions of those of all colors, creeds, and origins who have taken a stand against the tyranny of racial oppression."

=== Fates of the defendants ===
Fates of the Scottsboro Boys
Individual	Sentence	Served	Death	Notes
Clarence Norris	Death, commuted to life in prison by Governor Bibb Graves	Initially paroled in 1944, returned to prison due to parole violation, released on parole again in 1946; pardoned by Governor George Wallace in 1976	January 23, 1989	Initially released in 1944, but returned to prison following a parole violation for leaving Alabama. Last surviving member of the Scottsboro Boys at the time of his death. Published a memoir titled The Last of the Scottsboro Boys in 1979.
Haywood Patterson	75 years imprisonment	Escaped from prison in 1948. Found in Michigan in 1950, but Governor G. Mennen Williams refused his extradition.	August 24, 1952	Wrote a book about his experience, Scottsboro Boy, following his escape. In December 1950, Patterson was charged with murder after stabbing a man to death during a bar fight. After three trials, he was convicted of manslaughter and sentenced to six to 15 years in prison. Patterson died in Jackson State Prison of cancer in 1952. Posthumously pardoned in 2013.
James Andrew "Andy" Wright	99 years imprisonment	Initially paroled in 1944, returned to prison due to parole violation, released on parole again in 1950	June 25, 1968	Initially released in 1944, but returned to prison following a parole violation for leaving Alabama. In 1951, Wright was accused of rape for a second time in New York. His ex-girlfriend accused him of raping her 13-year-old foster daughter. An all-white jury acquitted him after he spent eight months in jail. Wright later stabbed his wife during a fight. She did not press charges, but he was forced to leave the state. Posthumously pardoned in 2013.
Charles "Charlie" Weems	75 years imprisonment	Paroled in 1943		Posthumously pardoned in 2013.
Ozie Powell	20 years imprisonment for assault	Paroled in 1943	January 30, 1973	In 1936, Ozie Powell was involved in an altercation with a corrections officer and shot in the face, suffering permanent brain damage. He was charged with assaulting an officer and went to prison under this charge, rather than the charge of rape.
Willie Roberson	All charges dropped	Released in 1937		In 1942, Roberson was convicted of disorderly conduct for harassing a woman on a subway in New York and sentenced to 90 days in prison.
Olen Montgomery	All charges dropped	Released in 1937	March 9, 1959	
Eugene Williams	All charges dropped	Released in 1937		
Leroy R. "Roy" Wright	All charges dropped	Released in 1937	August 16, 1959	In 1959, Wright murdered his wife and killed himself after finding her at the home of another man.

== In popular culture ==
=== Literature ===
- African American poet and playwright Langston Hughes wrote about the trials in his work Scottsboro Limited.
- The novel To Kill a Mockingbird by Harper Lee is about growing up in the Deep South in the 1930s. An important plot element concerns the father, attorney Atticus Finch, defending a black man against a false accusation of rape. The trial in this novel is often characterized as based on the Scottsboro case. But Harper Lee said in 2005 that she had in mind something less sensational, although the Scottsboro case served "the same purpose" to display Southern prejudices.
- Ellen Feldman's Scottsboro: A Novel (2009) was shortlisted for the Orange Prize; it is a fictionalized account of the trial, told from the point of view of Ruby Bates and a fictional journalist, Alice Whittier.
- Richard Wright's 1940 novel Native Son (New York: Harper, 1940) was influenced by the Scottsboro Boys case. There is a parallel between the court scene in Native Son in which Max calls the "hate and impatience" of "the mob congregated upon the streets beyond the window" (Wright 386) and the "mob who surrounded the Scottsboro jail with rope and kerosene" after the Scottsboro boys' initial conviction. (Maxwell 132)
- The poet Allen Ginsberg references the Scottsboro Boys in his poem "America".
- The Harlem Renaissance poet Countee Cullen wrote about the injustice of the trial in his poem "Scottsboro, Too, Is, Worth Its Song".
- In 1935, the artists Lin Shi Khan and Tony Perez created an illustrated account of the prosecutions of the Scottsboro Boys and gifted the manuscript to Joseph North, who was then an important figure in the Communist Party-USA and an editor of the left-wing journal, the New Masses. Published for the first time in 2002 by New York University Press, it is entitled Scottsboro Alabama: A Story in Linoleum Cuts and features a foreword by Robin D.G. Kelley.
- The 1945 novel The Pursuit of Love by Nancy Mitford mentions "the Scotsboro' boys" (sic.) in relation to the parties Linda attends after moving in with Christian Talbot in 1937. Her cousin Fanny remarks that they must be getting old and asks if they are still going. Linda remembers a divine party given by a high society type called Brian in what must be around 1931 (because it was right after the birth of her daughter who is six years old in 1937): "'Yes, and they've gone downhill socially,' said Linda, with a giggle. 'I remember a perfectly divine party Brian gave for them--it was the first party Merlin ever took me to, so I remember it well, oh, dear, it was fun. But next Thursday won't be in the least like that. (Darling I am being disloyal... But I'm always saying to Christian how much his buddies would either brighten up their parties a bit or else stop giving them, because I don't see the point of sad parties, do you?'" Then further on she remarks that she has no hope because people like Sir Leicester always win: "'And Left-wing people are always sad because they mind dreadfully about their causes, and the causes are always going so badly. You see, I bet the Scotsboro' boys will be electrocuted in the end, if they don't die of old age first, that is. One does feel so much on their side, but it's no good, people like Sir Leicester always come out on top so what can one do? However, the comrades don't seem to realize that, and, luckily for them, they don't know Sir Leicester, so they feel they must go on giving these sad parties.'"

=== Music ===
- The American folk singer and songwriter Lead Belly commemorated the events in his song "The Scottsboro Boys". In the song, he warns "colored" people to watch out if they go to Alabama, saying that "the man gonna get ya", and that the "Scottsboro boys [will] tell ya what it's all about." In a spoken afterword to the 1938 recording of that song, Lead Belly warns people to "stay woke" when going through that area, which may be the first recorded instance of that phrase.
- Metal/Rap band Rage Against the Machine provides imagery of the Scottsboro Boys in their music video "No Shelter", along with imagery of the executions of Sacco and Vanzetti, two men who were also denied a fair trial in court and were executed by authorities.

=== Film and television ===
- In 1976, NBC aired a TV movie called Judge Horton and the Scottsboro Boys, based on the case.
- In 1998, Court TV produced a television documentary on the Scottsboro trials for its Greatest Trials of All Time series. A premiere screening and discussion was held at Columbia University on July 21, 1998 in conjunction with the New York NAACP. On the panel was Columbia professor Manning Marable; James Meyerson, a former NAACP attorney responsible for one of the Scottsboro pardons; Jarvis Tyner, National Vice Chairman of the Communist Party USA; and Johnnie Cochran, prominent defense attorney and CourtTV anchor.
- Daniel Anker and Barak Goodman produced the story of the Scottsboro Boys in the 2001 documentary Scottsboro: An American Tragedy, which received an Oscar nomination.
- Timothy Hutton starred in a 2006 film adaptation titled Heavens Fall.

=== Theater ===
- Jean-Paul Sartre's 1946 play The Respectful Prostitute (La Putain respectueuse), in which a black man is wrongfully blamed for an incident on a train involving a white prostitute, is believed to have been based on the Scottsboro case.
- Utpal Dutta's 1968 play মানুষের অধিকারে (The Rights of Man) was based on the Scottsboro trials.
- The Scottsboro Boys is a staged musical portrayal of the Scottsboro case. The show premiered Off Broadway in February 2010 and moved to Broadway's Lyceum Theatre in October 2010. The show received good reviews, but closed on December 12, 2010. The musical opened in London's Young Vic Theatre in 2013 before moving to the Garrick Theatre in October 2014.
- Direct from Death Row The Scottsboro Boys, a black ensemble vaudevillesque "play with music and masks" Mark Stein production, directed by Michael Menendian, and presented at Chicago's Raven Theatre during the 2015 and 2016 seasons.

== See also ==
- 1995 Okinawa rape incident
- Scottsboro Boys Museum and Cultural Center
- Central Park Five
- Communist Party USA and African Americans
- False accusations of rape as justification for lynchings
- Groveland Four
- Martinsville Seven
- Willie McGee
- Emmett Till
