= 1964 Alabama Democratic presidential elector primary =

- May 5, 1964

10 nominees for the Democratic presidential electoral slate
Candidate	Unpledged	Pledged
Alliance	Alabama Democratic	Democratic
Popular vote	4,843,367	1,056,558
Percentage	81.27%	17.73%
Electors slated	10	0
County results (unofficial and incomplete results for place 1, compiled by The Birmingham News on May 7)
Unpledged
60–70%
70–80%
80–90%
90–100%
No results

The 1964 Alabama Democratic presidential elector primary was held on May 5, 1964, to choose the ten nominees for presidential electors to be listed on the general election ballot under the Democratic party label in the 1964 United States presidential election in Alabama. In 1960, Alabama was the only state where both presidential electors and DNC delegates were elected by popular vote. Instead of every candidate running in an at-large election, each candidate ran for a designated place, with the highest-placing candidates in each place receiving the nomination.

The election resulted in the nomination of ten unpledged electors not loyal to the national Democratic Party. Alabama was the only state in which Lyndon B. Johnson or electors pledged to him did not appear on the general election ballot in 1964.

== Electoral slates ==
=== Unpledged electors ===
The following candidates were recruited to serve as unpledged electors:

- Place 1: James Allen, 17th and 20th Lieutenant Governor of Alabama (1951–1955, 1963–1967)
- Place 2: Edmund Blair, newspaper publisher and independent elector in 1960
- Place 3: Albert Brewer, 58th Speaker of the Alabama House of Representatives (1963–1967)
- Place 4: Albert H. Evans, state senator from Alabama's 19th Senate district (1962–1966)
- Place 5: MacDonald Gallion, 37th and 39th Attorney General of Alabama (1959–1963, 1967–1971)
- Place 6: Jack Giles, director of the Alabama Department of Industrial Relations (1963–1964)
- Place 7: Art Hanes, mayor of Birmingham, Alabama (1961–1963)
- Place 8: Pete Matthews, state senator from Alabama's 34th Senate district (1962–1966)
- Place 9: Frank Mizell, attorney and independent elector in 1960
- Place 10: Jud Scott, businessman

=== Pledged electors ===
The following candidates were recruited to serve as loyalist electors:

- Place 1: Joseph N. Langan, mayor of Mobile, Alabama (1955–1956, 1957–1958, 1963–1964, 1965–1967)
- Place 2: J. E. Brantley, mayor of Banks, Alabama, loyalist elector in 1960
- Place 3: Barrett Shelton, newspaper publisher
- Place 4: John Sears Casey, state representative from Cleburne County (1959–1967)
- Place 5: Elbert Bertram Haltom Jr., state senator from Alabama's 1st Senate district (1958–1962)
- Place 6: H. Brandt Ayers, publisher of The Anniston Star
- Place 7: E. W. Skidmore, state senator from Alabama's 11th Senate district (1950–1958, 1966–1970)
- Place 8: C. G. Allen, loyalist elector in 1960
- Place 9: Karl Harrison, loyalist elector in 1960
- Place 10: J. K. Hardwick, mayor of Talladega, Alabama

=== Other candidates ===
The following candidates were not on either slate:

- Place 1:
  - Jerry Coe, former assistant attorney general
  - John Crommelin, perennial candidate
- Place 2
  - Ralph Price, perennial candidate
  - John Watts, businessman
- Place 3: Oley B. Kelley, insurance man

== Endorsements ==
Pledged

Politicians

- John G. Burton, former mayor of Jasper, Alabama
- J. Lister Hill, U.S. Senator from Alabama (1938–1969)
- Albert Rains, U.S. Representative from Alabama's 5th congressional district (1945–1965)
- James Record, chairman of the Madison County Commission
- John Sparkman, U.S. Senator from Alabama (1946–1979)

Newspapers

- Alabama Journal
- The Anniston Star
- The Birmingham News
- The Decatur Daily
- The Huntsville Times
- The Montgomery Advertiser
- The Opelika-Auburn News
- The Tuscaloosa News

Labor unions

- AFL-CIO Alabama Labor Council

Political parties

- Lauderdale County Democratic Executive Committee
- Madison County Democratic Executive Committee
Unpledged

Politicians

- George Wallace, 45th Governor of Alabama (1963–1967, 1971–1979, 1983–1987) and 1964 presidential primary candidate

Newspapers

- Birmingham Post-Herald
- The Clayton Record
- The Dothan Eagle
- The Florence Times
- The Selma Times-Journal
- The Talladega Daily Home

Organizations

- Alabama Citizen's Council

== Results ==
Place	Unpledged electors			Pledged electors			Others			Total
Place	Candidate	Votes	%	Candidate	Votes	%	Candidate	Votes	%	Total
1st	James Allen	516,027	83.02%	Joseph N. Langan	83,968	13.51%	Jerry Koe; John Crommelin	11,475; 10,114	1.85% 1.63%	621,584
2nd	Edmund Blair	460,663	79.40%	J. E. Brantley	98,741	17.02%	Ralph Price; John Watts	11,268; 9,496	1.94% 1.64%	580,168
3rd	Albert Brewer	504,716	82.71%	Barrett Shelton	87,997	14.42%	Oley B. Kelley	17,537	2.87%	610,250
4th	Albert Evans	477,854	79.56%	John Sears Casey	122,786	20.44%	—			600,640
5th	MacDonald Gallion	512,745	83.70%	Elbert Bertram Haltom Jr.	99,863	16.30%	—			612,608
6th	Jack Giles	481,763	81.60%	H. Brandt Ayers	108,662	18.40%	—			590,425
7th	Art Hanes	493,975	82.11%	E. W. Skidmore	107,619	17.89%	—			601,594
8th	Pete Matthews	421,499	77.34%	C. G. Allen	123,496	22.66%	—			544,995
9th	Frank Mizell	490,992	81.67%	Karl Harrison	110,168	18.33%	—			601,160
10th	Jud Scott	483,133	81.01%	J. K. Hardwick	113,258	18.99%	—			596,391
