= 1968 Alabama Democratic presidential elector primary =

- May 7, 1968

10 nominees for the Democratic presidential electoral slate
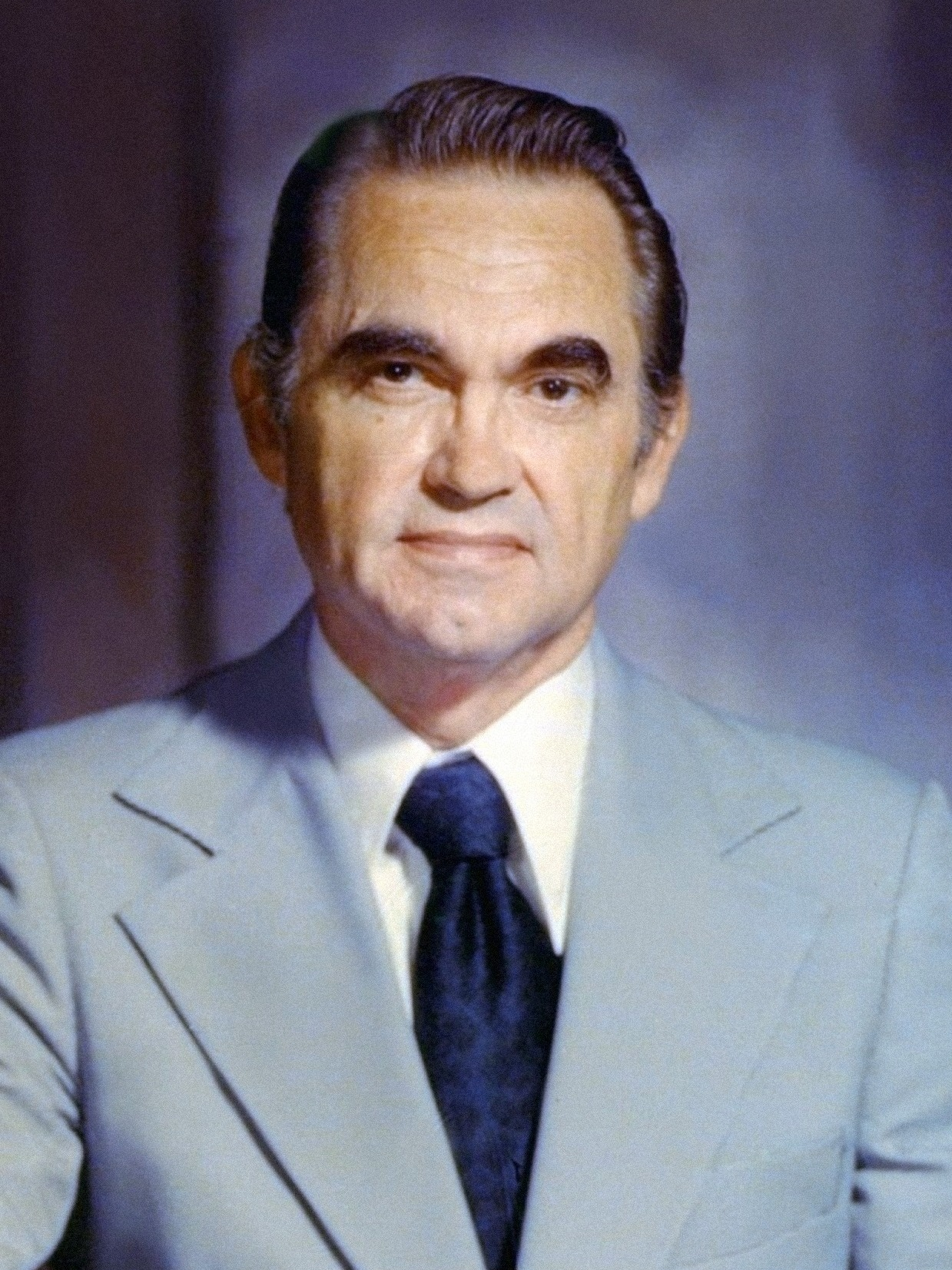

Candidate	Pro-George Wallace electors	Uncommitted electors
Popular vote	2,906,831	708,284
Percentage	80.41%	19.59%
Electors slated	10	0
Place 1 county results
Morgan
(Pro-Wallace)
60–70%
70–80%
80–90%
90–100%
Jennings
(Uncommitted)
60–70%

The 1968 Alabama Democratic presidential elector primary was held on May 7, 1968, to choose the ten nominees for presidential electors to be listed on the general election ballot under the Democratic party label in the 1968 United States presidential election in Alabama. Unlike in 1964, former Governor of Alabama George Wallace did not seek the national Democratic nomination for President, instead opting to run on a third-party ticket. Although many of Alabama's delegates to the DNC supported Wallace, he urged delegates to not vote for him. In most states, George Wallace had used the American Independent Party to gain ballot access for the presidency. In his home state of Alabama, however, Wallace sought to use the state Democratic Party's ballot line, the only state where he did so.

This was the last election in which the Alabama Democratic Party elected its presidential elector nominees by a primary vote, as in 1970, the State Democratic Executive Committee changed party rules to require the Democratic electoral college slate to be chosen by the Committee. By 1968, Alabama was the only state that still used this system. The Committee adopted this proposal 69–28.

== Electoral slates ==
=== Pro-Wallace ===
The following ten candidates for electors were endorsed by former Governor George Wallace:

- Place 1: Earl Morgan, attorney
- Place 2: Mabel S. Amos, 42nd Secretary of State of Alabama (1967–1975)
- Place 3: MacDonald Gallion, 37th and 39th Attorney General of Alabama (1959–1963, 1967–1971), unpledged elector in 1964
- Place 4: Mrs. Armistead Selden
- Place 5: Mrs. James Allen
- Place 6: Richard "Dick" Beard, Agricultural Commissioner of Alabama (1967–1972)
- Place 7: Frank Mizell, attorney, independent elector in 1960, and unpledged elector in 1964
- Place 8: Albert Brewer, 47th Governor of Alabama (1968–1971)
- Place 9: Agnes Baggett, 38th, 41st, and 43rd Secretary of State of Alabama (1951–1955, 1963–1967, 1975–1979)
- Place 10: Ernest Stone, Superintendent of Education of Alabama

=== Uncommitted electors ===
The following electors were on the ballot but were not endorsed by George Wallace:

- Place 1: Wayne Bodie Jennings, Democratic primary candidate for governor in 1962 (supported Wallace for president)
- Place 2:
  - Excell Baker, former state representative from DeKalb County
  - Carol Peck Jennings, wife of Place 1 uncommitted candidate Wayne Bodie Jennings
- Place 3: J. W. Todd Sr.
- Place 4:
  - Virginia M. Davis
  - Eddie Ashford
- Place 5:
  - Frank Dixon
  - Mrs. William S. McLaurine
- Place 6: W. E. Lacy III
- Place 8: Robert Muncaster
- Place 10: W. Klyde Allbritton

== Results ==
Place	Pro-George Wallace electors			Uncommitted electors			Total
Place	Candidate	Votes	%	Candidate	Votes	%	Total
1st	Earl Morgan	339,709	77.76%	Wayne Bodie Jennings	97,159	22.24%	436,868
2nd	Mabel S. Amos	353,123	76.80%	Carol Peck Jennings; Excell Baker	63,188; 43,502	13.74% 9.46%	459,813
3rd	MacDonald Gallion	387,793	90.27%	J. W. Todd Sr.	41,806	9.73%	429,599
4th	Mrs. Armistead Selden	336,340	74.08%	Virginia M. Davis; Eddie Ashford	78,809; 38,859	17.36% 8.56%	454,008
5th	Mrs. James Allen	371,233	78.61%	Frank Dixon; Mrs. William S. McLaurine	87,242; 13,768	18.47% 2.92%	472,243
6th	Richard "Dick" Beard	367,634	81.74%	W. E. Lacy III	82,109	18.26%	449,743
6th	Frank Mizell	Unopposed		—	—	—	—
8th	Albert Brewer	391,203	84.45%	Robert Muncaster	72,034	15.55%	463,237
9th	Agnes Baggett	Unopposed		—	—	—	—
10th	Ernest Stone	359,796	80.03%	W. Klyde Allbritton	89,808	19.97%	449,604
Source: Alabama Official and Statistical Register, 1971 (p. 366–371)
