= 1958 Alabama gubernatorial election =

- November 4, 1958
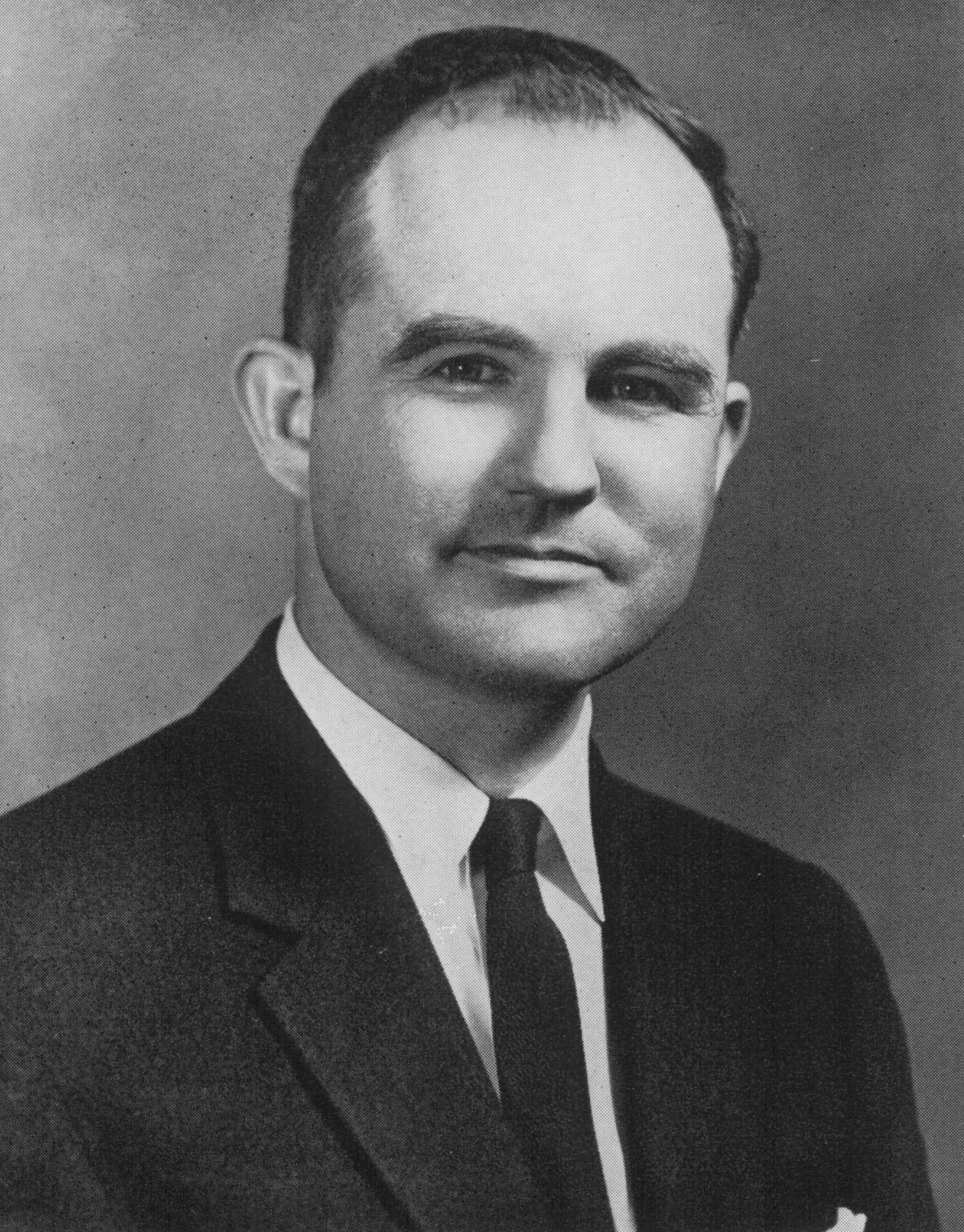

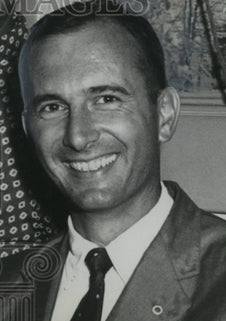
Nominee	John M. Patterson	William Longshore
Party	Democratic	Republican
Popular vote	234,583	30,415
Percentage	88.22%	11.44%
- County results Patterson: 60–70% 70–80% 80–90% >90%
Governor before election
Jim Folsom
Democratic
Elected Governor
John M. Patterson
Democratic

The 1958 Alabama gubernatorial election was held on November 4, 1958. Incumbent Democrat Jim Folsom was term limited and could not seek a second consecutive term.

== Democratic Party nomination ==
At this time Alabama was a de facto one-party state. Because of this, every Democratic Party nominee was considered safe for election. The real contest for governor took place during the primary.

Popular incumbent Governor Jim Folsom, a racial moderate, was barred from seeking a second consecutive term because the Alabama Constitution prohibited governors from succeeding themselves. Therefore, the Democratic primary was an open contest.

=== Candidates ===
- Laurie C. Battle, U.S. Representative
- John G. Crommelin, retired Rear Admiral
- W. E. Dodd
- Shearen Elebash
- Jimmy Faulkner, former State Senator and former Mayor of Bay Minette
- James Gulatte
- Karl Harrison
- George C. Hawkins, State Representative
- C. C. Owen
- John Malcolm Patterson, Attorney General
- Shorty Price
- A. W. Todd, Commissioner of Agriculture and Industries
- Billy Walker
- George Wallace, Third Judicial Circuit Judge and former State Representative

The two front-runners, Patterson and Wallace, held deeply different positions on racial segregation issues. While Patterson, known primarily as crime-fighting attorney general, ran on a very segregationist platform and accepted an official endorsement from the Ku Klux Klan, Wallace, a close ally of Folsom, refused to cooperate with the KKK and was endorsed by the NAACP.

After the election, aide Seymore Trammell recalled Wallace saying, "Seymore, you know why I lost that governor's race? ... I was outniggered by John Patterson. And I'll tell you here and now, I will never be outniggered again." (Note: Carter (1996, p. 2) notes that Wallace later denied a similar quotation that appeared in a 1968 biography by Marshall Frady: "'Well boys,' he said tightly as he snuffed out his cigar, 'no other son-of-a-bitch will ever out-nigger me again.'")

=== Primary results ===
Primaries were held on June 3, 1958.

Democratic primary results
Party	Candidate	Votes	%
Democratic	John Malcolm Patterson	196,859	31.82
Democratic	George Wallace	162,435	26.26
Democratic	Jimmy Faulkner	91,512	14.79
Democratic	A. W. Todd	59,240	9.58
Democratic	Laurie C. Battle	38,955	6.30
Democratic	George C. Hawkins	24,332	3.93
Democratic	C. C. Owen	15,270	2.47
Democratic	Karl Harrison	12,488	2.02
Democratic	Billy Walker	7,963	1.29
Democratic	W. E. Dodd	4,753	0.77
Democratic	John G. Crommelin	2,245	0.36
Democratic	Shearen Elebash	1,177	0.19
Democratic	James Gulatte	798	0.13
Democratic	Shorty Price	655	0.11
Total votes		618,682	100.00

=== Runoff ===
Results map of the Democratic primary by county. Patterson: 50–60% 60–70% 70–80% Wallace: 50–60% 60–70% 70–80% >90%

Because none of the candidates won a majority, a runoff was held on June 24, 1958, in order to determine which candidate received the nomination.

Democratic primary runoff results
Party	Candidate	Votes	%
Democratic	John Malcolm Patterson	315,353	55.74
Democratic	George Wallace	250,451	44.27
Total votes		565,804	100

== Republican Party nomination ==
William Longshore, a former Republican Party nominee for the U.S. House of Representatives from the 9th district (lost, winning 34.12% votes) won the gubernatorial nomination unopposed.

== General election ==
1958 Alabama gubernatorial election
Party	Candidate	Votes	%	±%
Democratic	John Malcolm Patterson	234,583	88.22	+14.85%
Republican	William Longshore	30,415	11.44	−15.19%
Independent	William Jackson	903	0.34	N/A
Majority		204,168		
Turnout		265,901	76.78	
Democratic hold				

After his defeat, George Wallace, who was a racial moderate, modified his public position in order to gain the white support necessary to win the next election.
