= 1946 Alabama Attorney General election =

- November 5, 1946
Candidate	Albert A. Carmichael	Jere Murphy
Party	Democratic	Republican
Popular vote	163,381	22,351
Percentage	88.0%	12.0%
Attorney General before election
William N. McQueen
Democratic
Elected Attorney General
Albert A. Carmichael
Democratic

The 1946 Alabama Attorney General election was held on November 5, 1946, to elect the Attorney General of Alabama to a four-year term. Albert A. Carmichael was elected to a second non-consecutive term.

== Democratic primary ==
=== Candidates ===
==== Nominee ====
- Albert A. Carmichael, former Lieutenant Governor of Alabama (1939–1943) and former Attorney General (1935–1939)

=== Results ===
Democratic primary
Party	Candidate	Votes	%
Democratic	A. A. Carmichael	209,340	100.00
Total votes		209,340	100.00

== Republican convention ==
=== Candidates ===
==== Nominee ====
- Jere Murphy

== General election ==
=== Results ===
1946 Alabama Attorney General election
Party	Candidate	Votes	%
Democratic	A. A. Carmichael	163,381	87.97
Republican	Jere Murphy	22,351	12.03
Total votes		185,732	100.00
