= Goldville =

Goldville may refer to the following places in the United States:

- Goldville, Alabama, a small town
- Goldville, Nevada, a ghost town
