= John M. Patterson =

American politician (1921–2021)

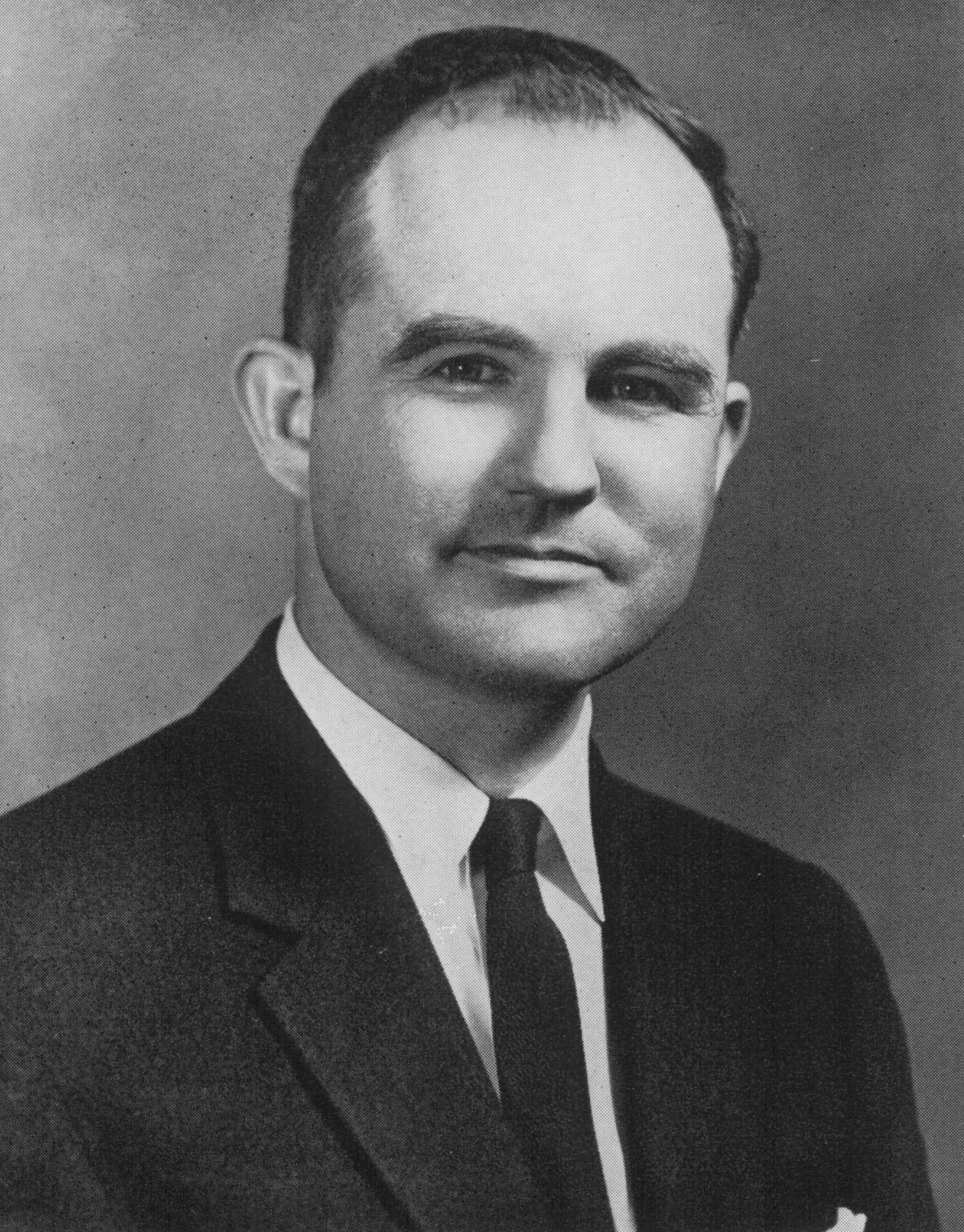
- Official portrait, 1959

44th Governor of Alabama
- In office January 19, 1959 – January 14, 1963
- Lieutenant: Albert Boutwell
- Preceded by: Jim Folsom
- Succeeded by: George Wallace

36th Attorney General of Alabama
- In office January 17, 1955 – January 19, 1959
- Governor: Jim Folsom
- Preceded by: Bernard Sykes
- Succeeded by: MacDonald Gallion

Personal details
- Born: John Malcolm Patterson; September 27, 1921 Goldville, Alabama, U.S.
- Died: June 4, 2021 (aged 99) Goldville, Alabama, U.S.
- Resting place: Bethlehem-New Salem Cemetery, New Site, Alabama
- Party: Democratic
- Spouses: Gladys Broadwater (m. 1942; div. 1945) Mary Jo McGowin (m. 1947; div. 1975) Tina Sawyer (m. 1975)
- Education: University of Alabama (LLB)

Military service
- Allegiance: United States
- Branch/service: United States Army
- Years of service: 1939–1945; 1951–1953
- Rank: Major
- Battles/wars: World War II; Korean War
- John M. Patterson's voice Patterson speaks against Federal intervention in Alabama; Recorded May 23, 1961

John Malcolm Patterson (September 27, 1921 – June 4, 2021) was an American politician. He served one term as Attorney General of Alabama from 1955 to 1959, and, at age 37, served one term as the 44th governor of Alabama from 1959 to 1963.

His turbulent tenure as governor was roiled by numerous civil rights protests and a long-running extramarital affair with Tina Sawyer, a mother of two who would eventually become his third wife. Patterson sought and ran with the support of the Ku Klux Klan when he won the governorship of Alabama in 1958. As governor, he was staunchly pro-segregation. He expressed regret for this position later in life.

Patterson came to wider attention in the mid-1950s when he and his father Albert (who was murdered in 1954) fought against criminal organizations that controlled the town of Phenix City, Alabama.

In 2003, Patterson was the presiding judge for former Alabama Chief Justice Roy Moore's appeal against his removal from the Alabama Supreme Court.

== Early life and career ==
Patterson was born in Goldville in Tallapoosa County in east central Alabama. He was the son of Agnes Louise (née Benson) and Albert Patterson, both schoolteachers. His father later became an attorney.

At age 18, on March 27, 1940, he joined the United States Army prior to the entry of the U.S. into World War II. He served in the North African, Sicilian, Italian, Southern France, and German campaigns, and also served on Dwight D. Eisenhower's staff. In 1945, he left the Army at the rank of major, and earned a Bachelor of Laws from the University of Alabama School of Law at Tuscaloosa. He was recalled to active duty in the Army from 1951 to 1953 during the Korean War and stationed in Europe. After his military service, he joined his father Albert Patterson's law practice.

== Attorney General of Alabama ==
In 1954, Patterson's father ran for state attorney general in the state's Democratic primary on a platform promising to eliminate crime in the mob-controlled town of Phenix City, where he lived and across the state. At the time, Alabama was a de facto one-party state dominated by the Democrats, and the Democratic nominee was all but assured of election. Albert Patterson was fatally shot in Phenix City by an unknown assailant on June 18, 1954, less than two weeks after winning the Democratic nomination. As expected, John Patterson replaced his father on the ballot and won the general election handily. The film The Phenix City Story (1955) was based on these events, and actor Richard Kiley portrayed Patterson in that film.

Patterson continued to challenge organized crime but became better known for his actions in opposition to civil rights. Following the 1954 Supreme Court decision in Brown v. Board of Education, which ordered an end to racial segregation in public schools, Patterson coordinated action in half a dozen Southern states against the National Association for the Advancement of Colored People. When the NAACP failed to register as an out-of-state organization, he used this technicality to ban it from operating in the state. Historian Dan T. Carter describes this as "a conspiracy to deprive Black southerners of their civil rights." Patterson also instituted legal action to defeat boycotts by Tuskegee blacks against white businesses.

== Governor of Alabama ==
In 1958, Patterson ran for governor of Alabama on a platform of strong law enforcement and segregation, citing his background in Phenix City and his crime-fighting efforts as attorney general. His segregationalist stand resulted in a campaign endorsement from the Ku Klux Klan. He commented: "If a school is ordered to be integrated, it will be closed down." Patterson won the Democratic primary against future governor George Wallace and other candidates. Patterson became the second-youngest governor in Alabama history and the first to move directly from the post of attorney general to the governorship.

During Patterson's tenure, the Alabama legislature increased funding for highways, inland waterways, old age pensions, schools, and mental health facilities. Improvements in public assistance were carried out, while laws curtailing loan sharking and various labor measures were also passed. Patterson was himself a supporter of organized labor, noting during a message to the Alabama legislature in May 1961 that “I want you to know that I am a strong believer in and supporter of organized labor. I will not support the enactment of any law which imposes upon or harasses labor in any way, nor will I allow any law presently in existence to be used in such manner. I am entirely in sympathy with the men and women who must work and work hard for a living.”

During his term as governor, Patterson embarked on a long-running extramarital affair with Tina Sawyer, a woman who would eventually become his third wife. Rumors of the affair spread throughout Montgomery, and Alabamians remarked that his infidelity affected his political career. The affair eventually led to the end of his second marriage. While Patterson was governor, black students who staged a sit-in at Alabama State University were expelled on his instruction, and he defended Alabama's voter registration policies against federal criticism.

=== Role in the Bay of Pigs invasion ===
In 1959, Patterson was approached by the Central Intelligence Agency (CIA) to allow Alabama Air National Guardsmen to help train pilots preparing for an invasion of Fidel Castro's Cuba. Assured that the project had the backing of President Dwight D. Eisenhower (Patterson had served on Eisenhower's staff during the war), Patterson gave his assent.

During the 1960 presidential campaign, Patterson was among a handful of Southern governors who backed John F. Kennedy for president. He raised money, collected delegates loyal to Kennedy within the state of Alabama, and led the state's delegation to the 1960 Democratic convention in Los Angeles. Patterson informed Kennedy of the Cuban invasion plan, thinking that invading before election day would have benefited Kennedy's Republican opponent, Vice President Richard Nixon. Only a few months into his presidency, Kennedy approved a modified version of the invasion plan, the Bay of Pigs Invasion.

=== Response to the Freedom Rides ===
In 1961, the Freedom Riders rode through Birmingham, Alabama, and were met with violence from members of the Alabama Ku Klux Klan. Patterson denounced the riders as "rabble-rousers" and refused to protect them. President Kennedy attempted to call Patterson, seeking a resolution to the violence, but Patterson refused his calls. A Kennedy representative publicly offered assistance to Patterson in front of reporters, to which Patterson responded "We don't need your marshals. We don't want them, and we didn't ask for them. And still the federal government sends them here to help put down a disturbance which it helped create."

US Attorney General Robert F. Kennedy sent John Seigenthaler, assistant to the Assistant Attorney General for Civil Rights, to meet in-person with Patterson to organize protections for the riders. Patterson agreed to dispatch Alabama state police, but concluded protecting the riders was too costly politically and revoked the protection order. Seigenthaler was attacked in the subsequent riot, fracturing his skull and multiple ribs. The Kennedy brothers responded to Patterson's negligence by dispatching US Marshals, including Chief Marshal James J. P. McShane, to Montgomery.

== Failed election bids ==
Patterson left office in 1963; the Constitution of Alabama did not allow governors to run for immediate reelection. His Democratic opponent from 1958, George Wallace, succeeded him. In 1966 Patterson ran a second time for governor but was defeated by Wallace's wife, Lurleen, who was widely understood to be a surrogate candidate for her husband.

In 1970, Patterson unsuccessfully contested the Democratic nomination for the post of Alabama Chief Justice, losing to future U.S. Senator Howell Heflin.

== Later public life ==
From the late 1970s through the 1980s, Patterson taught American government at Troy State University. During part of this time, George Wallace Jr. was an administrator at the school. During the same period, one-time California Superintendent of Public Instruction Max Rafferty headed the education department. In 1984, Governor George Wallace appointed Patterson to the intermediate Alabama Court of Criminal Appeals, on which he was re-elected until his retirement from it in 1997.

In 2003, Patterson was appointed chief justice of a "Special Supreme Court" that tried the case of Alabama Chief Justice Roy Moore, who appealed his removal from office after he had refused to remove a monument of the Ten Commandments from the courthouse despite orders from a federal court judge to do so. The special court ruled that Moore's removal was legal.

A 90-minute documentary on Patterson was completed in 2007 by Alabama filmmaker Robert Clem. Entitled John Patterson: In the Wake of the Assassins, the film features an extended interview with Patterson himself as well as with journalists, historians, and such figures as John Seigenthaler of The Tennessean, an aide to Robert F. Kennedy at the time of the Freedom Rides.

Patterson endorsed Barack Obama in the 2008 presidential election. Patterson publicly regretted his support of segregated schools. He said that during his era, any suggestion of ending racial bars in public schools was a political third rail in Alabama.

When I became governor, there were 14 of us running for governor that time and all 14 of us were outspoken for segregation in the public schools ... And if you had been perceived not to have been strong for that, you would not have won ... I regret that, but there was not anything I could do about it but to live with it.

An authorized biography of Patterson entitled Nobody but the People, written by historian Warren Trest, was published in 2008 by New South Books.

== Personal life and death ==
John Malcolm Patterson was married three times. He married his first wife, Gladys Broadwater, in 1942. Patterson soon regretted the marriage, and he and Gladys divorced soon after he entered university. He married his second wife, Mary Jo McGowin, in 1947. During this marriage, Patterson engaged in a long-running extramarital affair with another woman, Tina Sawyer. Although Mary Jo was deeply affected by the affair, news of which damaged Patterson's reputation, she stayed in the marriage and eventually became accustomed to his dalliance. After 28 years of marriage and citing infidelity, Mary Jo Patterson filed for divorce; it was finalized on June 10, 1975. Patterson married Sawyer on September 30, 1975. Mary Jo died in 1985.

Patterson died at his home in Goldville on June 4, 2021, 115 days short of his 100th birthday. At the time of his death, he was the last living former U.S. governor who served in the 1950s.

== Electoral history ==
Alabama gubernatorial election, 1958:

Democratic primary:
- John Malcolm Patterson – 196,859 (31.82%)
- George Wallace – 162,435 (26.26%)
- James H. Faulkner – 91,512 (14.79%)
- A. W. Todd – 59,240 (9.58%)
- Laurie Battle – 38,955 (6.30%)
- George C. Hawkins – 24,332 (3.93%)
- C. C. Owen – 15,270 (2.47%)
- Karl Harrison – 12,488 (2.02%)
- Billy Walker – 7,963 (1.29%)
- W. E. Dodd – 4,753 (0.77%)
- John G. Crommelin – 2,245 (0.36%)
- Shearen Elebash – 1,177 (0.19%)
- James Gulatte – 798 (0.13%)
- Shorty Price – 655 (0.11%)
Democratic primary runoff:
- John Malcolm Patterson – 315,353 (55.74%)
- George Wallace – 250,451 (44.27%)
General election:
- John Malcolm Patterson (D) – 234,583 (88.22%)
- William Longshore (R) – 30,415 (11.44%)
- William Jackson (I) – 903 (0.34%)

1966 Alabama gubernatorial election

Democratic primary:
- Lurleen Wallace – 480,841 (54.10%)
- Richmond Flowers – 172,386 (19.40%)
- Carl A. Elliot – 71,972 (8.10%)
- Bob Gilchrist – 49,502 (5.57%)
- Charles Woods – 41,148 (4.63%)
- John Malcolm Patterson – 31,011 (3.49%)
- Jim Folsom – 24,145 (2.72%)
- A. W. Todd – 9,013 (1.01%)
- Sherman Powell – 7,231 (0.81%)
- Eunice Gore – 1,589 (0.18%)

Election of Chief Justice of the Alabama Supreme Court, 1970:

Democratic primary:
- Howell Heflin – 550,997 (65.71%)
- John Malcolm Patterson – 287,594 (34.30%)

Legal offices
Preceded by Bernard Sykes	Attorney General of Alabama; 1955–1959	Succeeded by MacDonald Gallion
Party political offices
Preceded by Si Garrett	Democratic nominee for Attorney General of Alabama; 1954	Succeeded by MacDonald Gallion
Preceded by Jim Folsom	Democratic nominee for Governor of Alabama; 1958	Succeeded by George Wallace
Political offices
Preceded by Jim Folsom	Governor of Alabama; 1959–1963	Succeeded by George Wallace
Honorary titles
Preceded by Mike Stepovich	Earliest Serving Governor Still Living; 2014–2021	Succeeded by George Nigh
Preceded by David P. Buckson	Oldest living American governor 2017–2021	Succeeded by Al Quie
