= Si Garrett =

American politician (1913–1967)

Silas Garrett III

Attorney General of Alabama
- In office 1951–1954
- Governor: Gordon Persons
- Preceded by: Albert A. Carmichael
- Succeeded by: Bernard Sykes

Personal details
- Born: Silas Coma Garrett III; March 28, 1913 Grove Hill, Alabama, U.S.
- Died: July 24, 1967 (aged 54) Montgomery, Alabama, U.S.
- Party: Democratic
- Spouse: Electra Jones (m. 1941)
- Children: 2
- Education: University of Alabama, University of Alabama Law School

Silas Coma Garrett III (March 28, 1913 – July 24, 1967) was an American politician and attorney who served as Attorney General of Alabama for from 1951 to 1954.

Garrett was born in Grove Hill, Alabama, the son of Judge Silas Coma Garrett Jr., probate judge of Clarke County, Alabama. He graduated from the University of Alabama in 1933, where he was a member of the Phi Beta Kappa and Sigma Chi fraternities, and later served in the United States Army Air Forces in World War II, reaching the rank of lieutenant colonel. Garrett served as an assistant attorney general of Alabama shortly after his graduation from law school at the age of 22, from 1935 until 1942, when he resigned in order to run for election as attorney general. However, he eventually withdrew from the race in order to serve in the military for World War II. Considered a promising prospect for the office for many years, he was eventually elected as Attorney General in 1951.

On July 12, 1954, Garrett was indicted and arrested on one count of voter fraud alleged to have occurred in the Democratic primary election for Attorney General of June 1, 1954. After his opponent Albert Patterson was murdered on June 18, 1954, Garrett was amongst three officials who were specifically indicted for Patterson's murder, along with Chief Deputy Sheriff Albert Fuller and Circuit Solicitor Arch Ferrell. Of the three, only Fuller was convicted; he was sentenced to life imprisonment but was released after 10 years. Fuller died within the same year as his parole and claimed his innocence until his dying day. Ferrell was acquitted and Garrett was never brought to trial. His charges were dropped by then-Attorney General Richmond Flowers, because Garrett was convalescing in a mental institution in Texas for most of the year after Patterson's murder. Garrett later resided in Montgomery, Alabama, until his death on July 24, 1967, after a brief illness.

Party political offices
Preceded by Albert A. Carmichael	Democratic nominee for Attorney General of Alabama; 1950	Succeeded by John M. Patterson
