= John G. Crommelin =

United States Navy admiral

John Geraerdt Crommelin Jr.
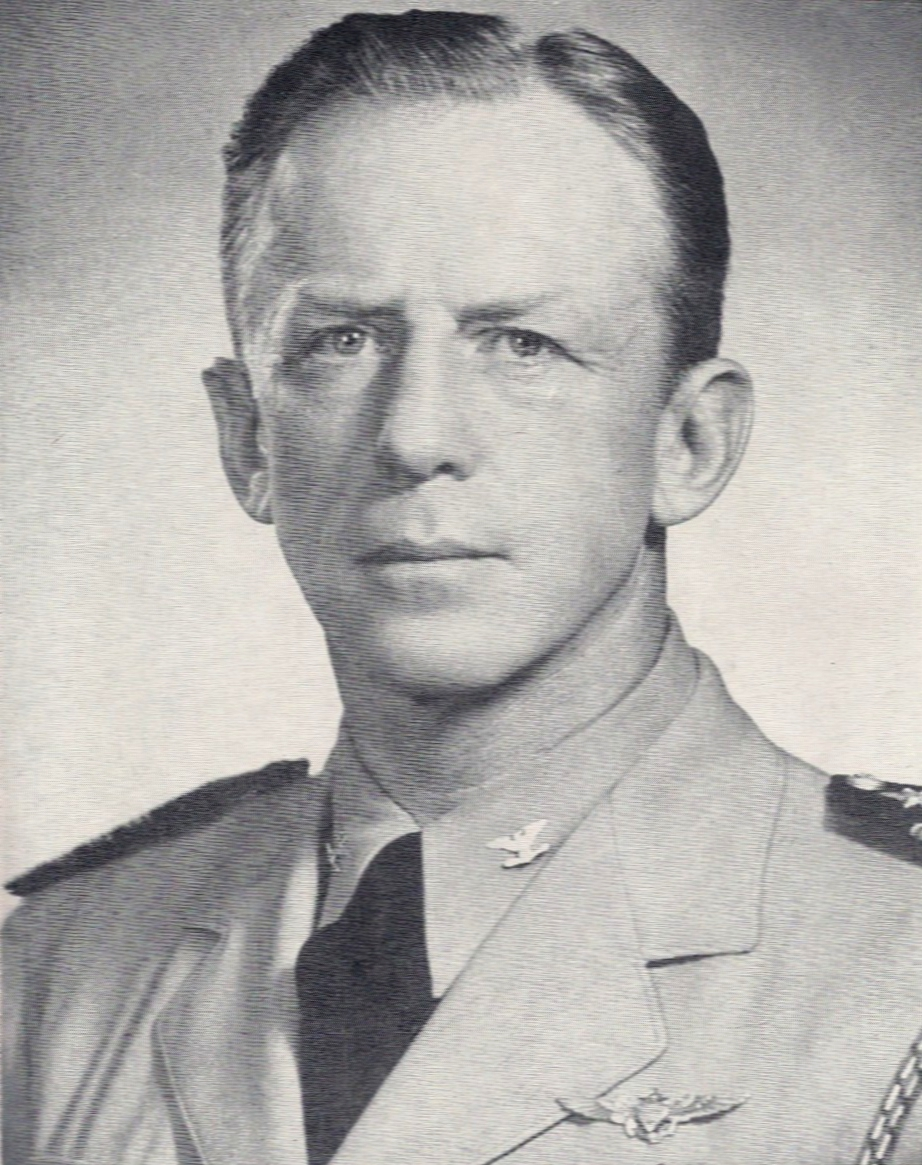
- Born: 2 October 1902; Montgomery, Alabama, U.S.
- Died: 2 November 1996 (aged 94); Montgomery, Alabama, U.S.
- Military career
- Allegiance: United States of America
- Branch: United States Navy
- Rank: Rear admiral
- Nickname: "Bomb-run John"
- Units: Naval aviation, USS Enterprise, Navy headquarters
- Conflicts: World War II
- Other work: Gubernatorial, Senate, vice presidential and presidential candidate

Rear Admiral John Geraerdt Crommelin Jr. (2 October 1902 – 2 November 1996) was a prominent American naval officer and later a frequent political candidate who championed white supremacy.

== Early life and naval career ==
Born in Montgomery, Alabama as eldest of five brothers, he graduated from the United States Naval Academy in Annapolis, Maryland in 1923. He grew up in Montgomery and in Elmore County, Alabama.

He saw combat at the Pacific during World War II. All of his brothers also graduated from the US Naval Academy and two of them were killed in action during World War II.

Crommelin earned a reputation as a courageous and skillful naval aviator and the nickname "bomb-run John". He served as an executive officer as well as air officer aboard the Enterprise and was chief of staff aboard the carrier Liscome Bay when it was sunk in the Makin Island campaign off the Gilbert Islands.

In 1946, Captain Crommelin was given command of the light carrier USS Saipan.

In 1949, he was transferred to Navy headquarters in The Pentagon at the rank of captain during the period of time of military budget reductions and unification of the command of the services.

In Washington, Crommelin became a vocal critic of military politics, warning of dangers of concentrating military authority in the hands of a few, despite being in active service. He publicly complained that the Defense Department was scuttling naval air power and showing improper favor to the Air Force and that "a Prussian General Staff system of the type employed by Hitler" was being imposed on the armed forces under unification.

During this Revolt of the Admirals, he made public some of the confidential correspondence of top Navy commanders who were critical of the Defense Departments designs to defund the Navy. Crommelin's opposition to the civilian political authority decisions to reduce the Navy and increase reliance on the Air Force placed him in a politically untenable position. Crommelin was publicly reprimanded by Navy Chief of Naval Operations Forrest P. Sherman and was transferred to San Francisco, California.

Crommelin was furloughed by Admiral Sherman at half pay, beginning early in 1950. Crommelin retired from active duty with the rank of rear admiral in May 1950, after 30 years of service. He went to operate a part of his family plantation, named Harrogate Springs, in Elmore County, raising a variety of crops.

== Political activity ==
Although he was widely praised and credited for his courage in speaking out for his views and for his previous distinguished combat career, Crommelin's reputation suffered from his later political involvement. He was an open and unapologetic racist, segregationist and antisemite even when such sentiments were becoming less fashionable in Alabama. Crommelin accused Jews of being the enemy of white Christians and blamed them for empowering the civil rights movement. In 1957, members of the Daughters of the American Revolution walked out of an event in Pensacola, Florida where Crommelin, as a guest speaker, made anti-semitic comments. The incident led to DAR President General Allene Wilson Groves making a statement against persecuting minorities. Following the Hebrew Benevolent Congregation Temple bombing, Crommelin organized a legal defense fund for the accused bombers and claimed that Jews had blown up the synagogue in order to gain sympathy.

Crommelin generally finished last or second-last in any election. He was nominated for Vice President in 1960 by the minor, far-right, white supremacist National States' Rights Party (not to be confused with the more moderate States' Rights Democratic Party of 1948), as the running mate of Orval Faubus, the Governor of Arkansas. Faubus denounced the NSRP in 1961 for having described the Eichmann trial as a "giant propaganda hoax".

One of the few times he did not finish last in an election came in 1964, when he ran in the Democratic primary for Alabama's 2nd congressional district, his home district, against 14-term incumbent George M. Grant. He was only the third substantive primary opponent that Grant had ever faced. While Crommerlin lost the primary by a 2-to-1 margin, Grant himself was routed in the general election in a backlash to the federal Democrats passing the Civil Rights Act of 1964.

In 1964, American Nazi Party leader George Lincoln Rockwell alleged to the FBI that Crommelin had been part of a conspiracy by right-wing former U.S. military officers to overthrow the federal government.

During the United States presidential election of 1968 he ran for the Democratic nomination in the New Hampshire primary, winning only 186 (0.34%) of the votes.

== Personal life and legacy ==
Crommelin married Lillian E. Tapley in 1930. They had two daughters and one son.

USS Crommelin, commissioned in 1983 as the twenty-eighth ship of the Oliver Hazard Perry class of guided-missile frigates, is named for John G. and his four brothers. The brothers are the only group of five siblings to graduate from the US Naval Academy, further highlighted by all five serving combat duty in World War II.

== Electoral history ==
Alabama United States Senate election, 1950

- J. Lister Hill (D) (inc.) – 125,534 (76.54%)
- John G. Crommelin (Independent) – 38,477 (23.46%)

Democratic primary for the U.S. Senate from Alabama, 1956

- J. Lister Hill (inc.) – 247,519 (68.20%)
- John G. Crommelin – 115,440 (31.81%)

1958 Alabama gubernatorial election (Democratic primary)

- John Malcolm Patterson – 196,859 (31.82%)
- George Wallace – 162,435 (26.26%)
- Jimmy Faulkner – 91,512 (14.79%)
- A.W. Todd – 59,240 (9.58%)
- Laurie Battle – 38,955 (6.30%)
- George Hawkins – 24,332 (3.93%)
- C.C. Owen – 15,270 (2.47%)
- Karl Harrison – 12,488 (2.02%)
- Billy Walker – 7,963 (1.29%)
- W.E. Dodd – 4,753 (0.77%)
- John G. Crommelin – 2,245 (0.36%)
- Shearen Elebash – 1,177 (0.19%)
- James Gulatte – 798 (0.13%)
- Shorty Price – 655 (0.11%)

Democratic primary for the U.S. Senate from Alabama, 1960

- John Sparkman (inc.) – 335,722 (86.68%)
- John G. Crommelin – 51,571 (13.32%)

1960 United States presidential election

- John F. Kennedy/Lyndon B. Johnson (D) – 34,220,984 (49.9%) and 303 electoral votes (22 states carried)
- Richard Nixon/Henry Cabot Lodge Jr. (R) – 34,108,157 (49.5%) and 219 electoral votes (26 states carried)
- Harry F. Byrd/Strom Thurmond/Barry Goldwater (Independents) – 15 electoral votes (Mississippi and Alabama unpledged and faithless electors from Oklahoma)
- Unpledged electors (D) – 286,359 (0.4%) and 0 electoral votes
- Eric Hass/Georgia Cozzini (Socialist Labor) – 47,522 (0.07%)
- Rutherford L. Decker/Earle Harold Munn (Prohibition Party) -–46,203 (0.07%)
- Orval E. Faubus/John G. Crommelin (National States' Rights Party) – 44,984 (0.07%)

Democratic primary for the U.S. Senate from Alabama, 1962

- J. Lister Hill (inc.) – 363,613 (73.71%)
- Donald G. Hallmark – 72,855 (14.77%)
- John G. Crommelin – 56,822 (11.52%)

Democratic primary for the U.S. Senate from Alabama, 1966

- John Sparkman (inc.) – 378,295 (56.98%)
- Frank E. Dixon – 133,139 (20.05%)
- John G. Crommelin – 114,622 (17.26%)
- Margaret E. Stewart – 37,889 (5.71%)

1968 United States presidential election (Democratic primaries)

- Eugene McCarthy – 2,914,933 (38.73%)
- Robert F. Kennedy – 2,305,148 (30.63%)
- Stephen M. Young – 549,140 (7.30%)
- Lyndon B. Johnson – 383,590 (5.10%)
- Thomas C. Lynch – 380,286 (5.05%)
- Roger D. Branigin – 238,700 (3.17%)
- George Smathers – 236,242 (3.14%)
- Hubert Humphrey – 166,463 (2.21%)
- Unpledged – 161,143 (2.14%)
- Scott Kelly – 128,899 (1.71%)
- George Wallace – 34,489 (0.46%)
- Richard Nixon (write-in) – 13,610 (0.18%)
- Ronald Reagan (write-in) – 5,309 (0.07%)
- Ted Kennedy – 4,052 (0.05%)
- Paul C. Fisher – 506 (0.01%)
- John G. Crommelin – 186 (0.00%)

== Bibliography ==
- Barlow, Jeffrey G. Revolt of the Admirals: The Fight for Naval Aviation, 1945–1950. Washington, D.C.: Naval Historical Center, 1994. ISBN 0-16-042094-6.
- McFarland, Keith (1980). "The 1949 Revolt of the Admirals" (PDF). Parameters: Journal of the US Army War College Quarterly Vol. XI, No. 2. pp. 53–63. Archived from the original (PDF) on 26 January 2017.
- Potter, E. B. (2005). Admiral Arliegh Burke. U.S. Naval Institute Press. ISBN 978-1-59114-692-6.

Party political offices
Preceded by N/A	National States' Rights Party vice presidential nominee 1960	Succeeded by J. B. Stoner
