= Faulkner University =

Christian university in Montgomery, Alabama, US

- Former names: Montgomery Bible School (1942–1953); Alabama Christian College (1953–1985)
- Motto: For God and For You
- Type: Private university
- Established: 1942; 84 years ago
- Religious affiliation: Churches of Christ
- Endowment: $30.2 million (2025)
- President: Dennis Mitchell Henry
- Faculty: 118
- Students: 3,574
- Undergraduates: 2,212
- Location: Montgomery, Alabama, U.S. 32°23′8″N 86°13′2″W
- Campus: Urban, 74 acres (0.30 km^{2})
- Colors: Blue & White
- Nickname: Eagles
- Sporting affiliations: NAIA – SSAC (primary); NAIA – Mid-South (football only)
- Website: faulkner.edu
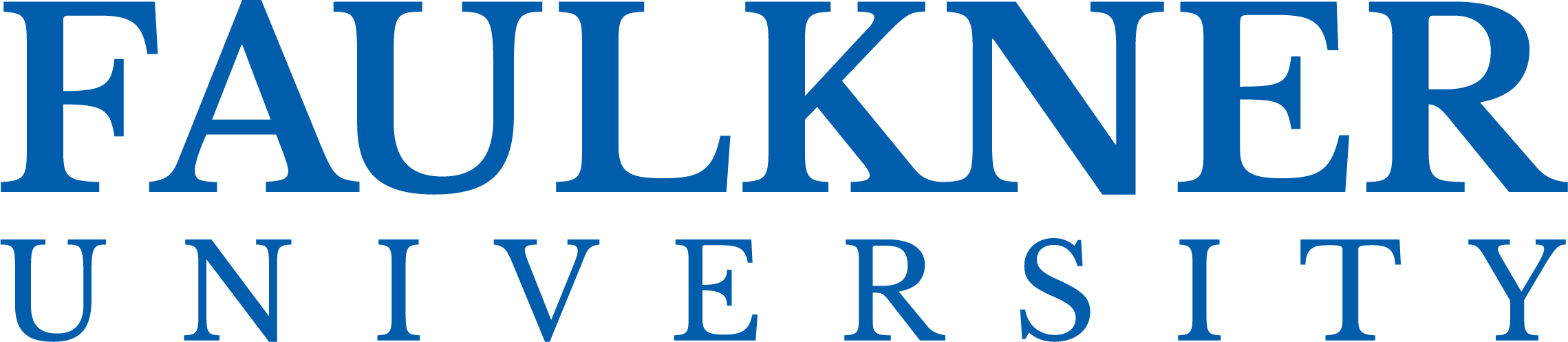

Faulkner University is a private Christian university in Montgomery, Alabama, United States. It is affiliated with the Churches of Christ.

== History ==
The university was founded in 1942 by Rex Turner, Leonard Johnson and Joe Greer as "Montgomery Bible School". In 1953 the school's name was changed to "Alabama Christian College" (ACC). In 1965, the college was moved to its present location on Atlanta Highway. The year 1975 marked the beginning of the school's satellite campuses in Mobile, Huntsville and Birmingham. In 1985, the school was renamed "Faulkner University" in honor of James H. Faulkner, a longtime supporter and chairman of the board.

Academic rankings

Regional
- U.S. News & World Report: 120 (tie)

== Accreditation ==
Faulkner University is accredited by the Commission on Colleges of the Southern Association of Colleges and Schools to award associate, baccalaureate, master's, a doctorate in humanities, a doctorate in biblical studies, and Juris Doctor degrees.

== Rankings ==
In 2024, U.S. News & World Report ranked Faulkner University tied for No.120 out of 135 Regional Universities South and tied for No.121 in Regional Universities South Top Performers on Social Mobility.

== Admissions ==
In 2023, the university accepted 82.4% of applicants, with those admitted having an average 3.36 GPA. Faulkner does not require submission of standardized test scores. Those submitting test scores had an average 950-1130 SAT score (6% submitting scores) or average 17-24 ACT score (47% submitting scores).

== Tuition and financial aid ==
In the 2017-2018 award year, Faulkner University had 1,700 students receiving Federal Pell Grants, totaling $7,229,388.

== Graduate programs ==
=== Law ===
Faulkner operates the Thomas Goode Jones School of Law, with between 200 and 300 students. The school of law was provisionally accredited by the American Bar Association in 2006, and fully accredited in 2009.

=== Theology ===
The Kearley Graduate School of Theology, which opened the fall of 2013, offers students Masters of Arts degrees in Biblical Theology, as well as a low-residency PhD in Biblical Studies.

=== Humanities ===
Faulkner University teaches from the canon of literature known as the Great Books of the Western World. Students attending Faulkner University are able to obtain a low-residency master's degree or a PhD in the Humanities through the university's Honors College.

== Campus ==
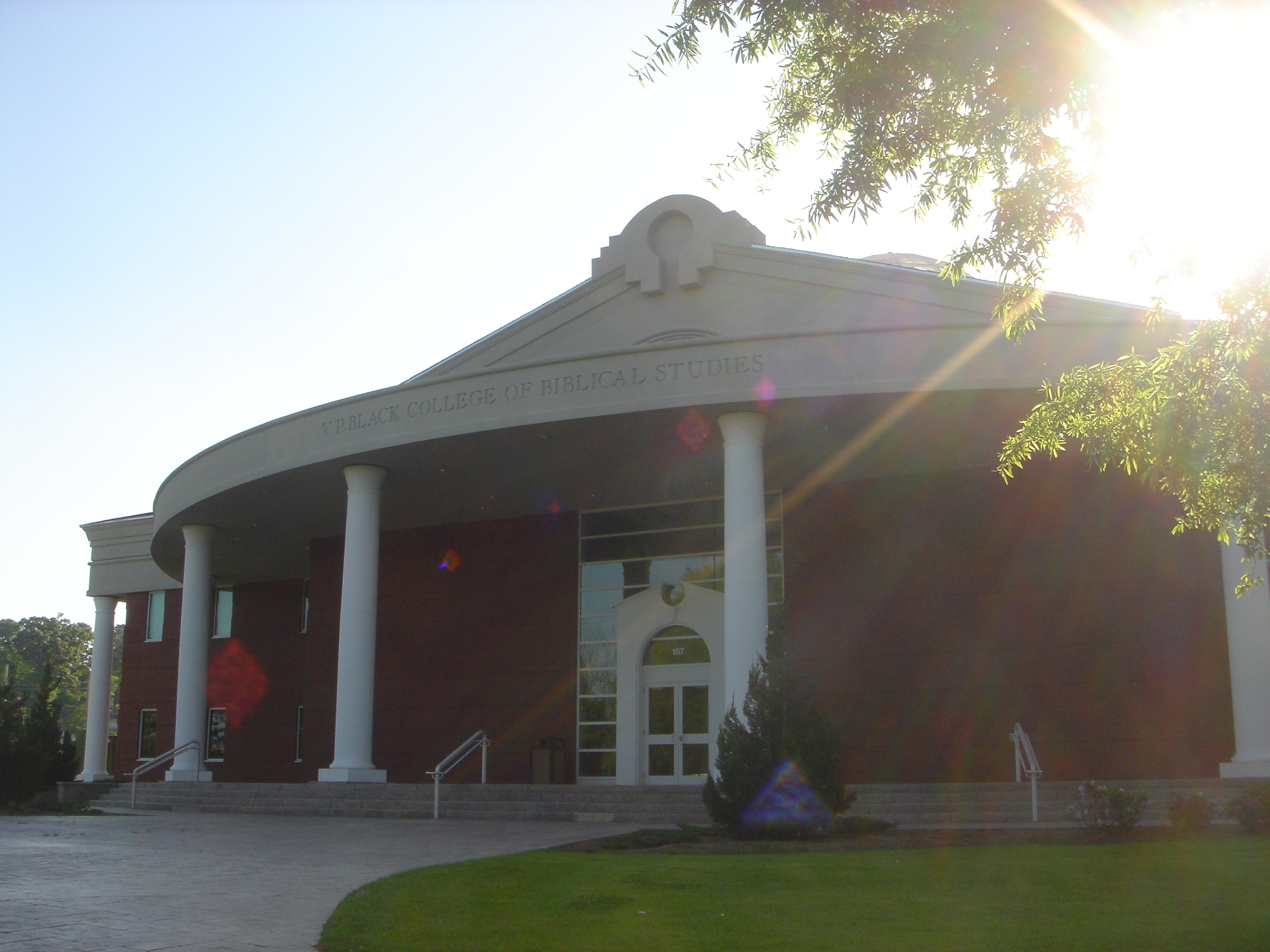
V.P. Black School of Biblical Studies

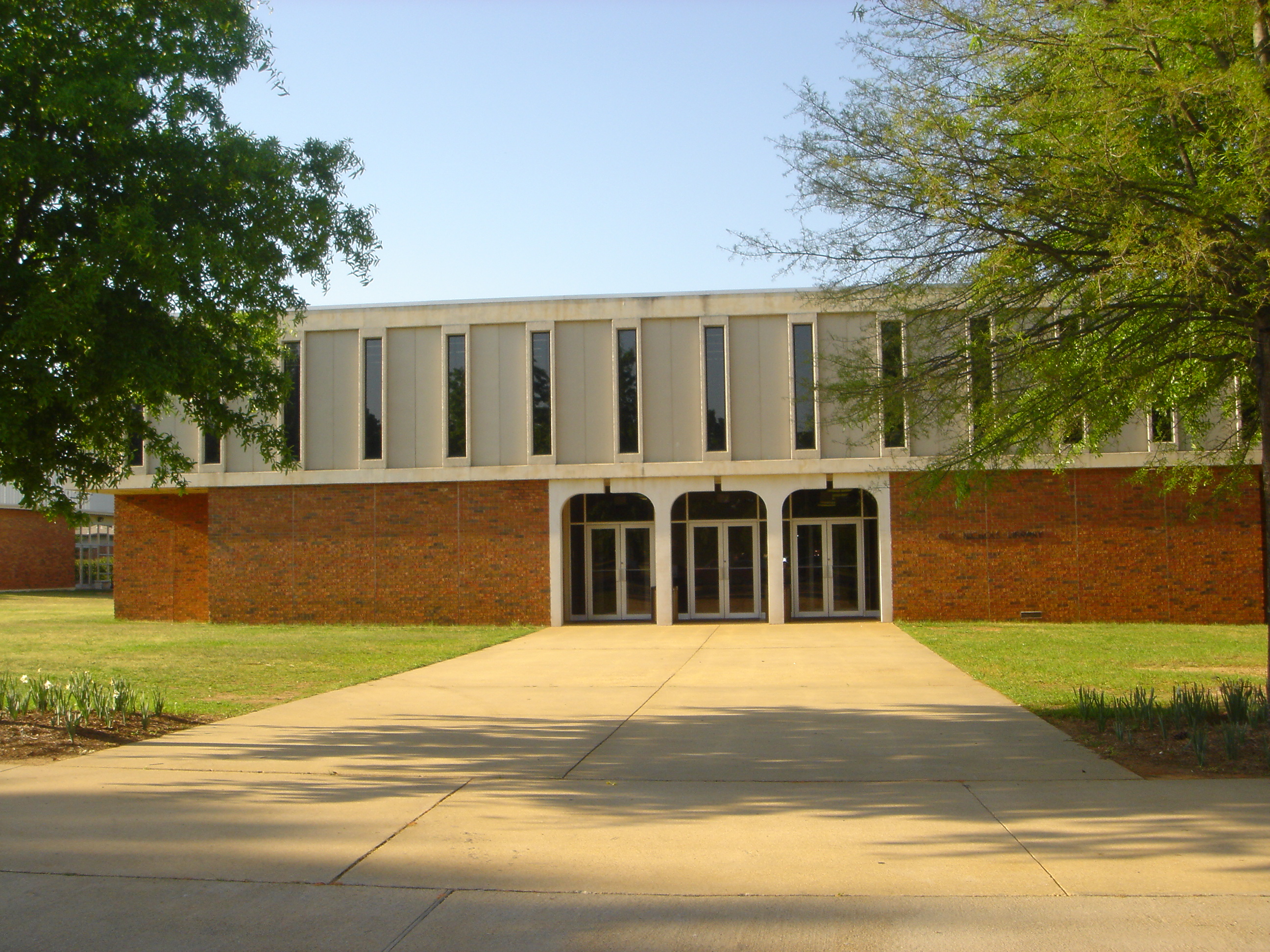
Gus Nichols Library

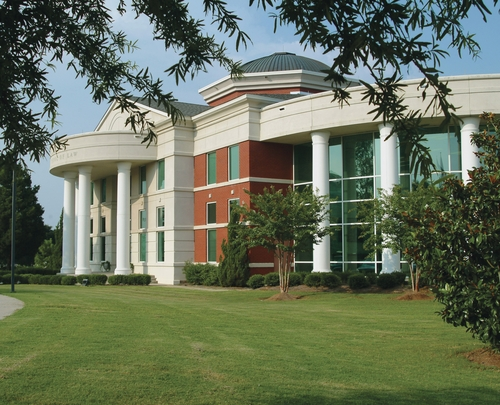
Thomas Goode Jones School of Law

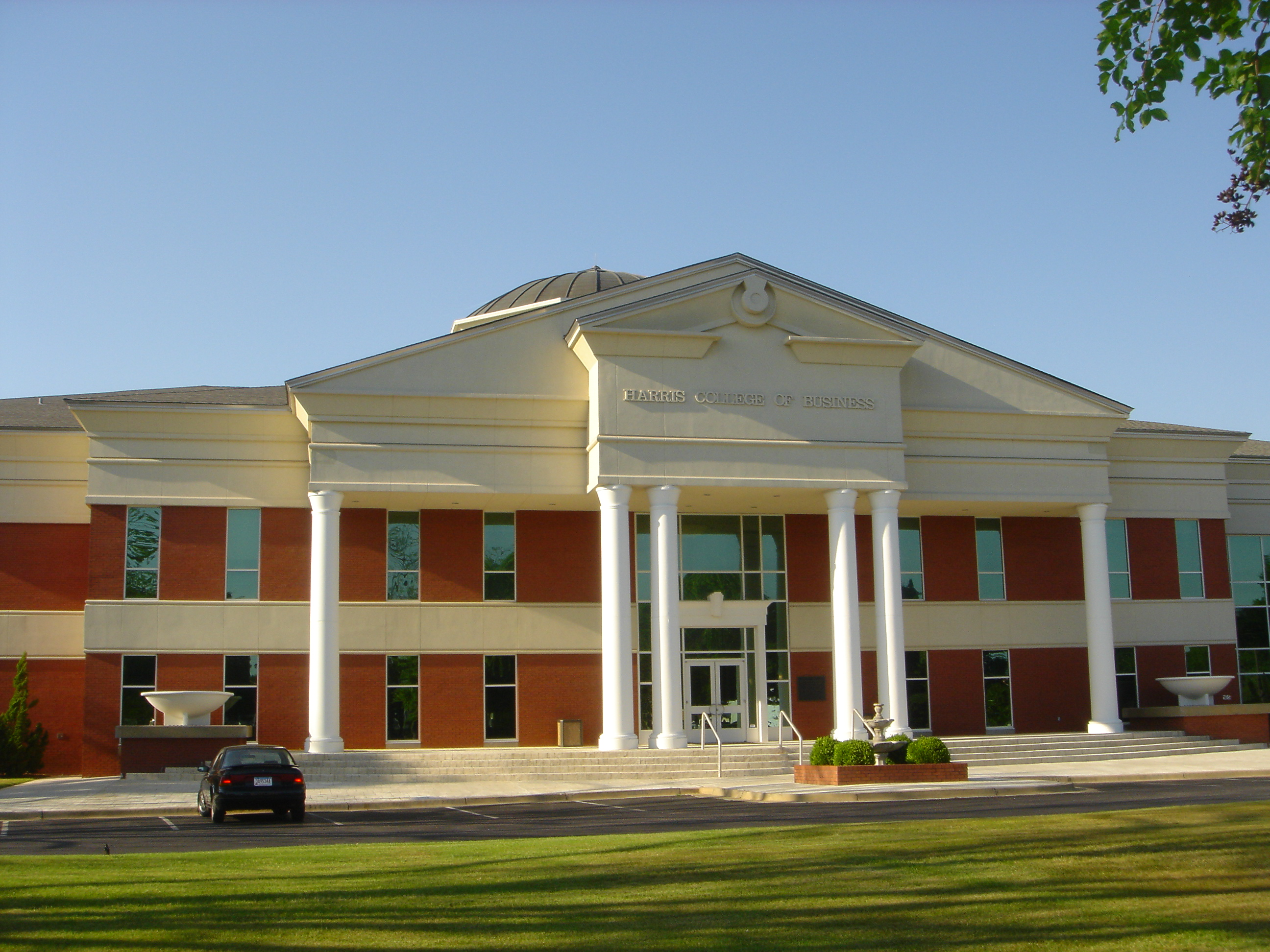
Harris College of Business

== Athletics ==
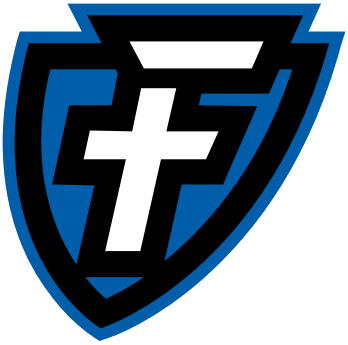
Faulkner athletics shield

The Faulkner athletic teams are called the Eagles. The university is a member of the National Association of Intercollegiate Athletics (NAIA), primarily competing in the Southern States Athletic Conference (SSAC; formerly known as Georgia–Alabama–Carolina Conference (GACC) until after the 2003–04 school year) for most of their sports since the 1999–2000 academic year; while its football team competes in the Sun Division of the Mid-South Conference (MSC), starting since the 2016 fall season.

They were also a member of the National Christian Collegiate Athletic Association (NCCAA), primarily competing as an independent in the South Region of the Division I level; which they won the national championship in baseball in 2001.

Faulkner competes in 12 intercollegiate varsity sports: Men's sports include baseball, basketball, cross country, football, golf and soccer; while women's sports include basketball, cross country, golf, soccer, softball and volleyball. Club sports include bass fishing, cheerleading and eSports.

== Notable alumni ==
- Bobby Bright – United States Congressman from Alabama
- Marcus Brimage – professional Mixed Martial Artist, former UFC competitor
- Corey Black – former Major League Baseball player
- Ray Ray Armstrong – former National Football League player
- Austin Adams - Major League Baseball player

== Notable faculty ==
- Allison Garrett – Associate Professor of Law (2004–07)
- Michael A. O'Donnell – Assistant Professor of Family Studies, Dean of Professional Studies

== See also ==
- Amridge University
