= Thomas E. Knight Jr. =

American politician

Thomas E. Knight
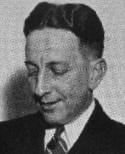

13th Lieutenant Governor of Alabama
- In office January 14, 1935 – May 17, 1937
- Governor: Bibb Graves
- Preceded by: Hugh D. Merrill
- Succeeded by: Albert A. Carmichael

29th Attorney General of Alabama
- In office January 19, 1931 – January 14, 1935
- Governor: Benjamin M. Miller
- Preceded by: Charlie C. McCall
- Succeeded by: Albert A. Carmichael

Personal details
- Born: June 19, 1898 Greensboro, Alabama
- Died: May 17, 1937 (aged 38) Montgomery, Alabama
- Party: Democratic
- Education: University of Alabama
- Profession: Attorney

Thomas E. Knight, Jr. (June 19, 1898 – May 17, 1937) was an American lawyer and politician who served as the 13th lieutenant governor of Alabama from 1935 to 1937, and the 19tth attorney general of Alabama from 1931 to 1935. He was a native of Greensboro, Alabama.

Knight was the prosecutor in the Scottsboro trials in the 1930s; as the Attorney General, he also represented the State before the United States Supreme Court in the three cases stemming from the trials: Powell v. Alabama, in 1932; and Norris v. Alabama and Patterson v. Alabama, both in 1935.

Knight died suddenly on May 17, 1937, in Montgomery, Alabama, due to complications from kidney and liver conditions.

== Popular culture ==
Knight was portrayed by actor Bill Sage in the 2006 movie Heavens Fall, opposing Timothy Hutton, starring as Scottsboro Boys defense attorney Samuel Leibowitz.

Knight was portrayed by actor Ken Kercheval in the 1976 TV movie Judge Horton and the Scottsboro Boys.

Legal offices
Preceded by Charlie C. McCall	Attorney General of Alabama; 1931–1935	Succeeded by A. A. Carmichael
Political offices
Preceded by Hugh D. Merrill	Lieutenant Governor of Alabama; 1935–1937	Succeeded by Albert A. Carmichael
