= 1964 United States presidential election in Alabama =

- November 3, 1964

Nominee	Barry Goldwater	Unpledged electors
Party	Republican	Democratic
Home state	Arizona	Alabama
Running mate	William E. Miller	—
Electoral vote	10	0
Popular vote	479,085	210,732
Percentage	69.45%	30.55%
County results
Goldwater
50–60%
60–70%
70–80%
80–90%
90–100%
Unpledged
50–60%
60–70%
President before election
Lyndon B. Johnson
Democratic
Elected President
Lyndon B. Johnson
Democratic

The 1964 United States presidential election in Alabama was held on November 3, 1964. Alabama voters chose ten representatives, or electors, to the Electoral College, who voted for President and Vice-president. In Alabama, voters voted for electors individually instead of as a slate, as in the other states.

Goldwater received 77% of the white vote. As of the 2024 presidential election, this is the last time that Sumter County, Greene County, Wilcox County, Lowndes County and Bullock County voted for a Republican candidate, as well as the last time that Macon County did not vote for the national Democratic candidate. Alabama was one of five states that swung more Republican in 1964, alongside Louisiana, Mississippi, Georgia, and South Carolina.

== Campaign ==
Alabama was central to the Civil rights movement in the 1960s. Governor George Wallace condemned and refused to comply with the Civil Rights Act of 1964.

The primary chose a set of unpledged Democratic electors. by a margin of five-to-one, Under Wallace's guidance, the Alabama Democratic Party placed this slate of unpledged Democratic electors on the ballot, against the advice of some legal scholars, but after planning to run for president himself (as he would do in 1968), decided against this in July. Johnson was the third winning president-elect to not appear on the ballot in Alabama, after Abraham Lincoln in 1860 and Harry S. Truman in 1948.

Initially, it was expected that this slate – the only option for mainstream Democrats in Alabama – would be pledged to Wallace himself, but he released them from pledges to vote for him if elected. Once campaigning began, Wallace supported Republican nominee Barry Goldwater over the unpledged slate, although he did campaign for Democratic candidates for state and local offices.

=== Predictions ===
Source	Rating	As of
The Boston Globe	Safe R (Flip)	August 2, 1964
The Wall Street Journal	Certain R (Flip)	September 29, 1964
The Christian Science Monitor	Likely R (Flip)	October 27, 1964
The Chicago Tribune	Safe R (Flip)	October 29, 1964
Los Angeles Times	Safe R (Flip)	November 1, 1964

== Results ==
General election results
Party	Pledged to	Elector	Votes
Republican Party	Barry Goldwater	Tom Abernethy	479,085
Republican Party	Barry Goldwater	Tammy Thomas	479,071
Republican Party	Barry Goldwater	Alfred Staples	478,925
Republican Party	Barry Goldwater	Tandy Little Jr.	478,540
Republican Party	Barry Goldwater	Wiley Deal	478,398
Republican Party	Barry Goldwater	Herbert Stockham	477,969
Republican Party	Barry Goldwater	Gordon Lawless	477,582
Republican Party	Barry Goldwater	Smith Lanier, II	477,339
Republican Party	Barry Goldwater	John E. Grenier	477,272
Republican Party	Barry Goldwater	Basil Horsfield	476,994
Democratic Party	Unpledged	James B. Allen	210,732
Democratic Party	Unpledged	MacDonald Gallion	209,848
Democratic Party	Unpledged	Edmund Blair	209,062
Democratic Party	Unpledged	Albert P. Brewer	208,059
Democratic Party	Unpledged	Pete Mathews	207,730
Democratic Party	Unpledged	Art Hanes	207,594
Democratic Party	Unpledged	Albert H. Evans Jr.	207,577
Democratic Party	Unpledged	Frank Mizell	207,357
Democratic Party	Unpledged	Jack Giles	207,144
Democratic Party	Unpledged	I. J. "Jud" Scott	206,618
Total votes			689,817

=== Results by county ===
County	Barry Goldwater Republican		Unpledged electors Democratic		Margin		Total votes cast
County	#	%	#	%	#	%	Total votes cast
Autauga	2,969	85.83%	490	14.17%	2,479	71.66%	3,459
Baldwin	10,870	81.12%	2,530	18.88%	8,340	62.24%	13,400
Barbour	3,853	79.76%	978	20.24%	2,875	59.52%	4,831
Bibb	2,623	83.94%	502	16.06%	2,121	67.88%	3,125
Blount	4,442	64.67%	2,427	35.33%	2,015	29.34%	6,869
Bullock	1,516	57.64%	1,114	42.36%	402	15.28%	2,630
Butler	4,002	80.44%	973	19.56%	3,029	60.88%	4,975
Calhoun	10,635	63.13%	6,210	36.87%	4,425	26.26%	16,845
Chambers	4,630	64.42%	2,557	35.58%	2,073	28.84%	7,187
Cherokee	1,893	49.70%	1,916	50.30%	-23	-0.60%	3,809
Chilton	5,202	75.97%	1,645	24.03%	3,557	51.94%	6,847
Choctaw	2,497	85.81%	413	14.19%	2,084	71.62%	2,910
Clarke	4,460	82.84%	924	17.16%	3,536	65.68%	5,384
Clay	2,815	70.13%	1,199	29.87%	1,616	40.26%	4,014
Cleburne	2,156	76.24%	672	23.76%	1,484	52.48%	2,828
Coffee	4,910	80.19%	1,213	19.81%	3,697	60.38%	6,123
Colbert	5,267	48.59%	5,573	51.41%	-306	-2.82%	10,840
Conecuh	2,782	81.32%	639	18.68%	2,143	62.64%	3,421
Coosa	1,978	72.77%	740	27.23%	1,238	45.54%	2,718
Covington	7,554	82.33%	1,621	17.67%	5,933	64.66%	9,175
Crenshaw	3,008	78.66%	816	21.34%	2,192	57.32%	3,824
Cullman	7,152	58.33%	5,110	41.67%	2,042	16.66%	12,262
Dale	4,970	83.77%	963	16.23%	4,007	67.54%	5,933
Dallas	5,888	89.12%	719	10.88%	5,169	78.24%	6,607
DeKalb	6,746	57.69%	4,948	42.31%	1,798	15.38%	11,694
Elmore	6,363	83.77%	1,233	16.23%	5,130	67.54%	7,596
Escambia	5,623	74.47%	1,928	25.53%	3,695	48.94%	7,551
Etowah	12,894	59.06%	8,939	40.94%	3,955	18.12%	21,833
Fayette	3,203	71.34%	1,287	28.66%	1,916	42.68%	4,490
Franklin	4,025	56.41%	3,110	43.59%	915	12.82%	7,135
Geneva	4,502	80.74%	1,074	19.26%	3,428	61.48%	5,576
Greene	1,124	65.69%	587	34.31%	537	31.38%	1,711
Hale	1,898	77.60%	548	22.40%	1,350	55.20%	2,446
Henry	2,896	83.10%	589	16.90%	2,307	66.20%	3,485
Houston	10,353	87.93%	1,421	12.07%	8,932	75.86%	11,774
Jackson	2,730	46.47%	3,145	53.53%	-415	-7.06%	5,875
Jefferson	100,756	72.57%	38,082	27.43%	62,674	45.14%	138,838
Lamar	2,734	72.42%	1,041	27.58%	1,693	44.84%	3,775
Lauderdale	5,978	47.55%	6,593	52.45%	-615	-4.90%	12,571
Lawrence	1,809	50.00%	1,808	49.97%	1	0.03%	3,617
Lee	5,914	78.69%	1,602	21.31%	4,312	57.38%	7,516
Limestone	2,377	43.99%	3,027	56.01%	-650	-12.02%	5,404
Lowndes	1,548	83.32%	310	16.68%	1,238	66.64%	1,858
Macon	1,858	38.46%	2,973	61.54%	-1,115	-23.08%	4,831
Madison	14,279	51.93%	13,217	48.07%	1,062	3.86%	27,496
Marengo	3,677	82.33%	789	17.67%	2,888	64.66%	4,466
Marion	3,966	69.42%	1,747	30.58%	2,219	38.84%	5,713
Marshall	5,712	56.33%	4,428	43.67%	1,284	12.66%	10,140
Mobile	49,493	70.72%	20,488	29.28%	29,005	41.44%	69,981
Monroe	3,870	81.37%	886	18.63%	2,984	62.74%	4,756
Montgomery	23,015	75.47%	7,482	24.53%	15,533	50.94%	30,497
Morgan	7,013	56.64%	5,368	43.36%	1,645	13.28%	12,381
Perry	2,046	79.73%	520	20.27%	1,526	59.46%	2,566
Pickens	3,416	82.08%	746	17.92%	2,670	64.16%	4,162
Pike	4,373	84.49%	803	15.51%	3,570	68.98%	5,176
Randolph	3,127	62.65%	1,864	37.35%	1,263	25.30%	4,991
Russell	4,877	76.04%	1,537	23.96%	3,340	52.08%	6,414
St. Clair	4,813	70.76%	1,989	29.24%	2,824	41.52%	6,802
Shelby	6,037	75.65%	1,943	24.35%	4,094	51.30%	7,980
Sumter	1,653	80.32%	405	19.68%	1,248	60.64%	2,058
Talladega	8,946	70.67%	3,712	29.33%	5,234	41.34%	12,658
Tallapoosa	5,530	76.14%	1,733	23.86%	3,797	52.28%	7,263
Tuscaloosa	13,227	68.67%	6,036	31.33%	7,191	37.34%	19,263
Walker	8,582	58.41%	6,110	41.59%	2,472	16.82%	14,692
Washington	2,803	70.18%	1,191	29.82%	1,612	40.36%	3,994
Wilcox	1,789	91.93%	157	8.07%	1,632	83.86%	1,946
Winston	3,438	71.19%	1,391	28.81%	2,047	42.38%	4,829
Totals	479,085	69.45%	210,732	30.55%	268,353	38.90%	689,817

==== Counties that flipped from Democratic to Republican ====
- Autauga
- Baldwin
- Barbour
- Bibb
- Blount
- Butler
- Calhoun
- Chambers
- Choctaw
- Clay
- Cleburne
- Coffee
- Conecuh
- Coosa
- Covington
- Crenshaw
- Cullman
- Dale
- DeKalb
- Elmore
- Escambia
- Etowah
- Fayette
- Geneva
- Hale
- Henry
- Lee
- Lawrence
- Madison
- Marengo
- Marion
- Marshall
- Monroe
- Morgan
- Mobile
- Shelby
- Perry
- Pickens
- Pike
- Randolph
- Russell
- St. Clair
- Talladega
- Tallapoosa
- Tuscaloosa
- Walker
- Washington
- Bullock
- Lowndes
- Wilcox
- Greene
- Sumter

==== Counties that flipped from Democratic to Unpledged ====
- Cherokee
- Colbert
- Jackson
- Lauderdale
- Limestone
- Macon

== See also ==
- United States presidential elections in Alabama

== Works cited ==
- Black, Earl; Black, Merle (1992). The Vital South: How Presidents Are Elected. Harvard University Press. ISBN 0674941306.
