= H. Brandt Ayers =

American publisher and journalist (1935–2020)

- Born: Harry Brandt Ayers; April 8, 1935; Anniston, Alabama, US
- Died: May 3, 2020 (aged 85)
- Education: University of Alabama
- Occupations: Publisher; Editor; Journalist
- Employers: Anniston Star; Consolidated Publishing Co.
- Spouse: Josephine Ayers

Harry Brandt Ayers, also known as Brandy Ayers (8 April 1935 - 3 May 2020) was a publisher and journalist based in Anniston, Alabama, part of the Ayers family of publishers.

== Early life ==
Ayers was born in Anniston, Alabama, to Colonel Harry Mell Ayers and his wife. At that time Colonel Ayers was owner of the Anniston Star newspaper. Ayers attended Woodstock Elementary School, followed by The Wooster School in Danbury, Connecticut. He subsequently attended the University of Alabama, where he received his BA. Ayers served in the US Navy as an officer, following which he briefly worked for the Anniston Star before moving to work for a newspaper in Raleigh, North Carolina, where he met his wife Josephine.

== Publishing career ==
Ayers returned to Anniston in the 1960s to take over the family newspaper and succeed his father as publisher. During this time he moved the newspaper towards being more favourable towards the Civil rights movement that was active in Alabama during this time. Ayers also provided commentary for National Public Radio.

Under Ayers' leadership, the Star's critical stance towards the leadership of Alabama governor George Wallace, and generally left-wing position on the political issues of the day, led Wallace to label it The Red Star.

Ayers stood down as publisher of the Star in 2016, but remained in charge of the publishing company that owned it, Consolidated Publishing Co.

== Me Too controversy ==
In November 2017, during the Me Too movement, allegations that Ayers had physically assaulted female employees by spanking them emerged. In January 2018 Ayers acknowledged that one of the incidents had occurred but claimed that this incident, which had occurred in his employee's home, had been on a doctor's advice to "calm her down". When confronted with a second incident in which he allegedly spanked a 20-year old female employee 18 times with a metal ruler in the presence of another young employee Mike Stamler at the offices of the Star when he was 40 years old, he stated that he would "Let the accusation stand". Stamler, then 22, said that he witnessed the assault in shock from across the room. Trisha O'Connor, a journalism professor who worked at the Star as a reporter and editor during the 1970s, told the Associated Press that such incidents perpetrated by him were common knowledge in the newsroom during that period. O'Connor and other female employees at the newspaper would warn new female workers to avoid Ayers. Ayers allegedly told his romantic dates that he would spank them if they knew him better. A second woman anonymously said that Ayers called her to his office later that year and spanked her after she missed covering a local meeting. Subsequent research showed that allegations of spanking had been levelled against Ayers as early as 2007 by former executives.

Ayers initially refused to resign as head of Consolidated Publishing in the wake of the allegations. However, as further incidents emerged he resigned from his post at Consolidated Publishing and was replaced by his wife. Ayers was listed amongst prominent media figures to have been the subject of sexual harassment, assault, or other misconduct allegations during the Me Too movement.

== Bibliography ==
- In Love with Defeat: The Making of a Southern Liberal
- Ayers, H. Brandt (2015). Cussing Dixie, Loving Dixie: Fifty Years of Commentary by H. Brandt Ayers. Tuscaloosa: University of Alabama Press. ISBN 9780817389307.
