= Goldville, Nevada =

Ghost town in Eureka County, Nevada

- Ghost town
- Location within the state of Nevada Goldville (the United States)
- Coordinates: 40°54′36″N 116°18′33″W
- Country: United States
- State: Nevada
- County: Eureka
- Elevation: 6,109 ft (1,862 m)
- Time zone: UTC-8 (Pacific (PST))
  - Summer (DST): UTC-7 (PDT)

Goldville is a ghost town in Eureka County, Nevada, United States.

== History ==
Goldville District was founded by two prospectors in 1907. The mine they discovered became known as the Lynn Big Six Mine. During the first year of activities, the mine consisted of $21,000 worth of ore, which was later shipped to Salt Lake City.

In 1908, the mine's ore was depleted, causing the miners to leave. In 1912, the Lynn Big Six Mining Company reopened the Lynn Big Six Mine and soon started shipping ore to Salt Lake City once again.

A year later, a small camp and post office opened. Although the post office was closed in 1917, the mining company remained active. However, ore values began to decrease, and in 1939 all mining activities were shut down.
