= The Anniston Star =

American daily newspaper

- The July 27, 2005 front page of The Anniston Star
- Type: Daily newspaper
- Format: Broadsheet
- Owner: Consolidated Publishing Co.
- Publisher: Blucher Ehringhaus III, John Fry
- Editor: Timothy Cash
- Founded: 1883
- Headquarters: 1118 Noble Street; Anniston, Alabama 36201; United States
- Price: USD 1.00 Wednesday, 2.00 Weekend Edition
- Website: annistonstar.com

The Anniston Star is the hyper-local, daily newspaper serving Anniston, Alabama, and the surrounding six-county region. Average Sunday circulation in September 2004 was 26,747. However, by 2020 it was approximately half of this. The newspaper is locally owned by Consolidated Publishing Company, which is controlled by the Ayers family of Anniston. The paper operates as a "digital-first" publication, while publishing two print editions each week.

== History ==
=== Founding and early years (1883-1911) ===
In 1883, the Woodstock Iron Company founded a newspaper for the newly opened company town of Anniston, Alabama, naming it the Daily Hot Blast after the sound of the iron ore furnaces. Dr. Thomas W. Ayers, a local physician, purchased the Hot Blast in the 1890s. In 1910, his son Harry M. Ayers and businessman Thomas E. Kilby purchased it for $7,000 (equivalent to $241,875 in 2025). Ayers and Kilby then bought out the Evening Star, consolidating the two papers under the eventual name The Anniston Star. Kilby sold his stake to Ayers before running for lieutenant governor, with Ayers continuing to support his campaign editorially.

=== Harry M. Ayers era (1911-1960s) ===
Under Harry Ayers, the paper took an openly boosterist editorial approach, favoring optimistic coverage of local affairs and civic achievement. Wallace describes its editorial stance as presenting Anniston favorably to attract outside investment. Ayers served twice as president of the Anniston Chamber of Commerce, and held active roles in the Rotary Club, the American Legion, the Alabama Press Association, and the Southern Newspaper Publishers Association.

The paper endorsed Franklin D. Roosevelt for president in 1932 and continued to back him through his four terms, though Ayers at times opposed specific New Deal policies while supporting Roosevelt personally. In 1937 the paper abandoned its support for Prohibition, with Ayers arguing that it had encouraged crime.

By 1928, the Star reached six thousand in a city of thirty thousand residents.

=== H. Brandt Ayers era (1965-2018) ===
H. Brandt Ayers took over the paper from his father in 1965. Under the younger Ayers' watch, the Star reversed its initial skepticism toward the Civil Rights Movement and strongly supported school integration, one of the few Southern papers to do so. George Wallace derisively nicknamed the paper The Red Star for its support of integration. It has consistently remained one of the more liberal newspapers in a state that has grown increasingly friendly to Republicans.

The Star is Consolidated's flagship paper. Other newspapers printed by the company include The Daily Home, and the weeklies The Cleburne News, the St. Clair Times, and the News Journal.

=== 21st century ===
During the COVID-19 pandemic, Anthony Cook, head of the Star's publishing company, announced that the editorial page was to be discontinued. Cook also voluntarily furloughed himself rather than laying off staff.

=== H. Brandt Ayers controversy ===
On January 2, 2018, during the Me Too movement, former publisher H. Brandt Ayers admitted that he assaulted Wendy Sigal in her Anniston home in the 1970s. Wendy Sigal was a reporter who worked at the newspaper in 1973 and 1974. He admitted he spanked her, but it was with the advice of a doctor. Veronica Pike Kennedy said that Ayers spanked her 18 times when she was 20 years old in the Star's newsroom with a metal ruler in 1975 in the presence of a young male employee and Ayers seemed to confirm it.

In March 2019 H. Brandt Ayers resigned as head of Consolidated Publishing after further alleged incidents of misconduct on his part emerged, including further alleged incidents of physical abuse, particularly spanking of female staff. He was replaced by his wife, Josephine Ayers. H. Brandt Ayers died in May 2020.
