= William N. McQueen =

American attorney and politician

32nd Attorney General of Alabama
- In office 1943–1947
- Governor: Chauncey Sparks
- Preceded by: Thomas S. Lawson
- Succeeded by: Albert A. Carmichael

Personal details
- Born: September 18, 1908; Eutaw, Alabama, U.S.
- Died: July 12, 1980 (aged 71)
- Political party: Democratic

William N. McQueen (September 18, 1908 – July 12, 1980) was an American attorney and politician. He served as attorney general of Alabama from 1943 to 1947.

== Life and career ==
McQueen was born in Eutaw, Alabama.

McQueen served as attorney general of Alabama from 1943 to 1947.

McQueen died on July 12, 1980, at the age of 71.
