= Richmond Flowers Sr. =

American lawyer (1918–2007)

Attorney General of Alabama
- In office 1963–1967
- Governor: George C. Wallace
- Preceded by: MacDonald Gallion
- Succeeded by: MacDonald Gallion

Alabama State Senator from the 35th district
- In office 1954–1958

Personal details
- Born: Richmond McDavid Flowers; November 11, 1918 Dothan, Alabama, U.S.
- Died: August 9, 2007 (aged 88)
- Party: Democratic
- Children: Richmond M. Flowers Jr.
- Education: Auburn University; University of Alabama Law School
- Occupation: Attorney

Military service
- Allegiance: United States
- Branch/service: United States Army
- Years of service: 1942–1946
- Battles/wars: World War II

Richmond McDavid Flowers Sr. (November 11, 1918 – August 9, 2007) was the attorney general of the U.S. state of Alabama from 1963 to 1967, best known for his opposition to then Governor George C. Wallace's policy of racial segregation. He also served in the Alabama Senate.

== Early life, education, and military service ==
Flowers was born on November 11, 1918 (World War I Armistice Day) in Dothan in Houston County in southeastern Alabama, to a locally prominent family, the youngest of four brothers. After graduating from Dothan High School, he attended Auburn University in Auburn.

Flowers entered the University of Alabama School of Law in Tuscaloosa in 1941, but interrupted his law school studies in 1942 when drafted into the United States Army. He graduated from Officer Candidate School in Camp Barkeley, Texas. He was assigned to Fort Oglethorpe, then Fort McPherson, and then to Manila and Tokyo, where he was a hospital administrator assigned to General Headquarters, Far East Command during the occupation of Japan. He was honorably discharged in 1946.

After being discharged from the military, Flowers returned to Dothan, where he worked for the Dothan Bank and Trust Company, which his family owned. Flowers returned to the University of Alabama School of Law. He later co-founded Flowers Insurance Agency.

== Political career ==
Flowers was elected to the Alabama State Senate in 1954 and became the floor leader, serving until 1958. He was chosen as attorney general in the same election that George Wallace won the first of four non-consecutive terms as governor.

As an intraparty opponent of Wallace, Flowers was invited to speak at the Yale Law School in the fall of 1965, a venue that had previously booed Wallace from that same stage. Instead of echoing the then-popular (in the North) criticisms of Wallace, Flowers began his speech with a lengthy, withering, and completely unexpected indictment of his hosts' poor manners for their refusal to have listened earlier to Wallace. In his ensuing remarks, Flowers discussed not only the importance of civil rights but the need for civil discourse and honoring the fundamental principles of the First Amendment.

During his tenure as attorney general, Flowers won two landmark voting rights cases, Baker v. Carr and Reynolds v. Sims, before the United States Supreme Court. He also was instrumental in allowing women to serve on juries in Alabama.

In 1966, Flowers ran in the Democratic gubernatorial primary in an effort to succeed the term-limited George Wallace. He faced former U.S. Representative Carl Elliott of Jasper, two former governors, James Folsom and John Malcolm Patterson, and Lurleen Burns Wallace, Wallace's first wife and his then-surrogate candidate. Flowers sought African American support in his campaign. He administered what may have been the death blow to his own campaign when he falsely suggested Lurleen Wallace had not graduated from high school and then said she had done nothing since except marry, work in a dime store, and be a housewife. Mrs. Wallace easily won the Democratic nomination and then handily defeated the conservative Republican U.S. Representative James D. Martin of Gadsden and in doing so captured a majority of the black vote.

Flowers prosecuted the Ku Klux Klan and fought for school desegregation. He reported that crosses were burned in his yard, and bricks were thrown through his windows.

== Conviction ==
In 1968, Flowers and two others were indicted on federal charges of a conspiracy to extort payments from life insurance companies that sought licenses to conduct business in Alabama. The three were convicted the following year, and Flowers was sentenced to eight years in prison. He was paroled in 1973 after serving 16 months. Flowers maintained that the prosecution was politically motivated by opponents of his anti-segregation stance, but the appeals courts affirmed the conviction. The portion of the Hobbs Act under which Flowers was convicted was later struck down as unconstitutionally vague. President Jimmy Carter granted him a pardon in 1978, after which Flowers' license to practice law was restored.

== Family ==
Because of the trouble in Alabama, his son Richmond Flowers Jr. declined an offer from Alabama Crimson Tide football coach Paul W. Bryant to play football at Alabama. Flowers Jr. had been an athlete in Alabama but played college football at the University of Tennessee at Knoxville and was instrumental, scoring the game–winning touchdown, in defeating Alabama and Coach Bryant during his senior season. At the time, his father watched from the stands in Neyland Stadium in handcuffs. Flowers Jr. was also a member of the University of Tennessee track team. He was a world-class hurdler and played in the National Football League with the Dallas Cowboys and the New York Giants.

The third generation Richmond Flowers, III, is a former wide receiver at Duke University, who transferred to the University of Tennessee at Chattanooga. He was drafted by the Jacksonville Jaguars but was cut from the team. He also tried out with the Toronto Argonauts of the Canadian Football League. He now is an assistant coach for the Washington Commanders.

== Later years ==
In his later years, Flowers taught criminal justice and U.S. history at Wallace Community College in Dothan, formerly the George C. Wallace State Community College, named for the father of his longstanding political rival. He was a legal advisor to Flowers Hospital. A member of First United Methodist Church, he taught the men's Bible class for twenty-five years.

Flowers Jr. is the subject of a 1989 CBS television docudrama titled Unconquered, with screenplay by Pat Conroy.

== Works cited ==
- John Hayman, Bitter Harvest: Richmond Flowers and the Civil Rights Revolution (NewSouth Books, 2016).

Party political offices
Preceded by MacDonald Gallion	Democratic nominee for Attorney General of Alabama; 1962	Succeeded by MacDonald Gallion
Legal offices
Preceded by MacDonald Gallion	Attorney General of Alabama; 1963–1967	Succeeded by MacDonald Gallion
