= The Daily Home =

Daily newspaper in Talladega, Alabama

- Type: Daily newspaper
- Format: Broadsheet
- Owner: Consolidated Publishing
- Publisher: Robert Jackson II
- Editor: Anthony Cook
- Managing editor: Lew Gilliand
- Founded: 1867 (as Our Mountain Home)
- Language: English
- Headquarters: 6 Fort Lashley Ave, Talladega, AL 35160
- Website: dailyhome.com

The Daily Home is a daily newspaper serving the Talladega County and St. Clair County, Alabama areas. Originally begun as a weekly in 1867 it was called Our Mountain Home until daily production began in 1909 at which point the name was changed to The Talladega Daily Home. In 1965 the paper was purchased by Consolidated Publishing a local company which also publishes the Anniston Star and several local weeklies. The name was changed to The Daily Home when an office was opened in Sylacauga and coverage expanded to include all of Talladega County. In 1980 an office was opened in Pell City and the coverage expanded to its current circulation area.
