= Albert A. Carmichael =

American politician (1895–1952)

30th & 33rd Attorney General of Alabama
- In office January 20, 1947 – January 15, 1951
- Governor: Jim Folsom
- Preceded by: William N. McQueen
- Succeeded by: Si Garrett
- In office January 14, 1935 – January 17, 1939
- Governor: Bibb Graves
- Preceded by: Thomas E. Knight
- Succeeded by: Thomas S. Lawson

14th Lieutenant Governor of Alabama
- In office January 17, 1939 – January 19, 1943
- Governor: Frank M. Dixon
- Preceded by: Thomas E. Knight
- Succeeded by: Leven H. Ellis

Personal details
- Born: Albert Augustus Carmichael; July 27, 1895 Scranton, Pennsylvania, U.S.
- Died: June 4, 1952 (aged 56) Montgomery, Alabama, U.S.
- Party: Democratic
- Spouse: Erin Stallworth (m. 1930)
- Education: University of Alabama (LLB)

Military service
- Allegiance: United States
- Branch/service: United States Army
- Rank: Colonel
- Battles/wars: World War I World War II

Albert Augustus Carmichael (July 27, 1895 – June 4, 1952) was an American politician who served as the 14th lieutenant governor of Alabama from 1939 to 1943.

Before assuming his role as lieutenant governor, Carmichael gained notoriety for his position in the Albert A. Carmichael v. Southern Coal Company Records supreme court case. This case tested the constitutionality of pooled-based state unemployment insurance laws. He accused the legislature of arbitrary and unreasonable assessment of some employers which allegedly colluded in order to pay benefits to workers who were employed by other firms.

Political offices
Preceded by Thomas E. Knight	Lieutenant Governor of Alabama; 1939–1943	Succeeded by Leven H. Ellis
