= Goldville, Alabama =

- Town
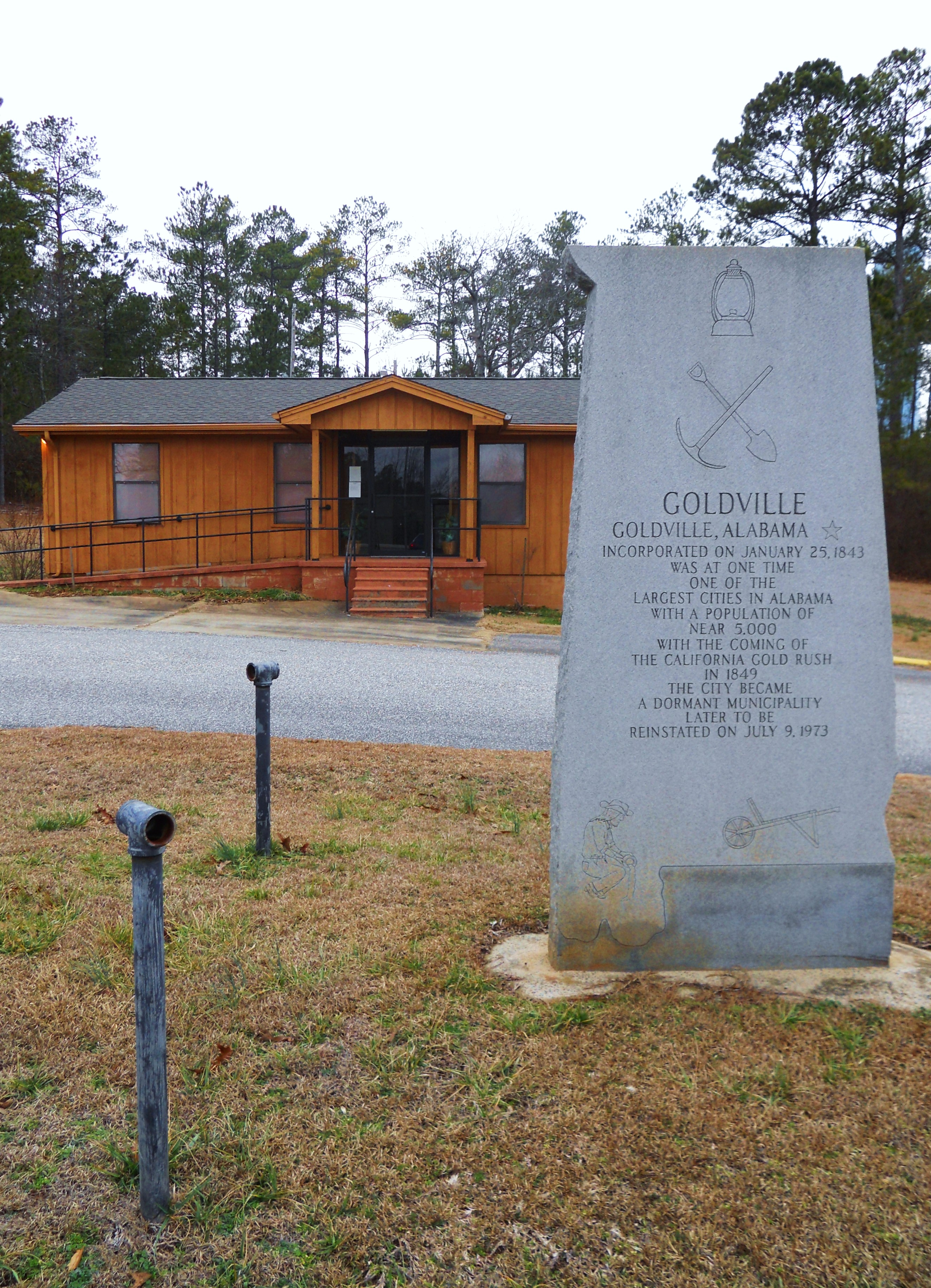
- Goldville sign

- Location of Goldville in Tallapoosa County, Alabama.
- Coordinates: 33°05′03″N 85°46′59″W
- Country: United States
- State: Alabama
- County: Tallapoosa

Area
  - Total: 1.00 sq mi (2.59 km^{2})
  - Land: 0.98 sq mi (2.55 km^{2})
  - Water: 0.015 sq mi (0.04 km^{2})
- Elevation: 1,001 ft (305 m)

Population (2020)
  - Total: 52
  - Density: 52.8/sq mi (20.37/km^{2})
- Time zone: UTC-6 (Central (CST))
  - Summer (DST): UTC-5 (CDT)
- FIPS code: 01-30448
- GNIS feature ID: 2406586

Goldville is a town in Tallapoosa County, Alabama, United States. As of the 2020 census, Goldville had a population of 52.

== History ==
The name of the area derives from the discovery of large gold deposits in the area. The area was so popular with prospectors that at one time the temporary post office of Goldville handled more mail in a day than New York City.

The historical monument in the town reads: "GOLDVILLE / Goldville, Alabama / incorporated on January 25, 1843 / was at one time / one of the / largest cities in Alabama / with a population of / near 5,000 / With the coming of / the California gold rush / in 1849 / the city became / a dormant municipality / later to be / reinstated on July 9, 1973"

== Geography ==
According to the U.S. Census Bureau, the town has a total area of 1.0 square mile (2.6 km^{2}), of which 1.0 square mile (2.6 km^{2}) is land and 1.00% is water.

== Demographics ==
Historical population
Census	Pop.	Note	%±
1970	34		—
1980	89		161.8%
1990	61		−31.5%
2000	37		−39.3%
2010	55		48.6%
2020	52		−5.5%
U.S. Decennial Census

As of the census of 2000, there were 37 people, 15 households, and 12 families residing in the town. The population density was 37.5 inhabitants per square mile (14.5/km^{2}). There were 17 housing units at an average density of 17.2 per square mile (6.6/km^{2}). The racial makeup of the town was 100.00% White.

There were 15 households, out of which 26.7% had children under the age of 18 living with them, 73.3% were married couples living together, 6.7% had a female householder with no husband present, and 20.0% were non-families. 13.3% of all households were made up of individuals, and 6.7% had someone living alone who was 65 years of age or older. The average household size was 2.47 and the average family size was 2.67.

In the town, the population was spread out, with 24.3% under the age of 18, 8.1% from 18 to 24, 24.3% from 25 to 44, 27.0% from 45 to 64, and 16.2% who were 65 years of age or older. The median age was 36 years. For every 100 females, there were 94.7 males. For every 100 females age 18 and over, there were 86.7 males.

The median income for a household in the town was $25,625, and the median income for a family was $35,000. Males had a median income of $27,500 versus $21,875 for females. The per capita income for the town was $15,209. There were no families and 13.6% of the population living below the poverty line, including no under eighteens and 100.0% of those over 64.

== Notable people ==
- John Malcolm Patterson, 44th Governor of Alabama
