= John Sears Casey =

American attorney and politician (1930–2022)

Member of the Alabama House of Representatives from the Cleburne County district
- In office 1959–1967

Personal details
- Born: December 31, 1930 Birmingham, Alabama, U.S.
- Died: June 16, 2022 (aged 91) Heflin, Alabama, U.S.
- Spouse: Mary Carolyn Jackson (m. 1957)
- Education: Jacksonville State University, Auburn University, University of Alabama School of Law
- Occupation: Lawyer

John Sears Casey (December 31, 1930 – June 16, 2022) was an American attorney and politician who served as a member of the Alabama House of Representatives from 1959 to 1967, representing Cleburne County, Alabama.
