= MacDonald Gallion =

American politician

Attorney General of Alabama
- In office January 19, 1959 – January 14, 1963
- Preceded by: John Malcolm Patterson
- Succeeded by: Richmond Flowers Sr.
- In office January 16, 1967 – January 18, 1971
- Governor: George C. Wallace; Lurleen Wallace; Albert Brewer
- Preceded by: Richmond Flowers Sr.
- Succeeded by: Bill Baxley

Personal details
- Born: April 5, 1913 Montgomery, Alabama, US
- Died: August 11, 2007 (aged 94) Montgomery, Alabama, US
- Spouse: Velma Lee
- Children: 2

Military service
- Allegiance: United States
- Branch/service: United States Marine Corps
- Years of service: 1942–1945
- Rank: First Lieutenant
- Battles/wars: World War II

MacDonald Gallion (April 5, 1913 – August 11, 2007) served as the Attorney General of Alabama for two non-consecutive terms from 1959 until 1963 and again from 1967 until 1971.

== Life ==
Gallion was born in 1913 in Montgomery. He attended Lakeview Grammar School, Paul Hyne and Phillips High Schools in Birmingham. He was a member of the Presbyterian church. Gallion attended the University of Alabama from 1931 until 1937, when he received his law degree. He then began the practice of law. While a student, he was a member of the Alpha Tau Omega fraternity.

Gallion married his wife Velma Lee on July 10, 1942, in Oneonta. Together, they had a son and a daughter.

During World War II, Gallion served in the U.S. Marine Corps from 1942 until 1945. He rose to the rank of 1st Lieutenant and saw combat in the Central Pacific and was wounded at Saipan.

After the war, Gallion served as a special counsel for the State of Alabama in the Phenix City trials. He served as the Chief Assistant Attorney General during the tenure of then-Attorney General John M. Patterson from 1955 to 1959.

Gallion was a Mason. He was also a member of the Loyal Order of Moose, Elks, Woodmen of the World, and the Sons of Confederate Veterans. He died on August 11, 2007.

=== Attorney General of Alabama ===
Gallion was elected Attorney General in 1958 as a Democrat for the 1959–1963 term of office. During his first term in office Gallion spoke at a Montgomery County Citizens Council gathering, condemning the leadership of the Congress of Racial Equality as communists. During the pro-segregation event held at the state coliseum (now known as Garrett Coliseum) he went on to characterize Freedom Riders as "a foolish group of meddlers, bleeding hearts, publicity seekers, and assorted misfits."

In-eligible to seek a second consecutive term in 1962, he opted to run for governor but lost the Democratic primary to George C. Wallace. He successfully sought re-election to his old office of Attorney General four years later in 1966. Prior to the 1970 elections, the state legislature changed the law allowing statewide elected officials to serve a second consecutive term. In what was considered an upset, he lost re-nomination in 1970 to Bill Baxley, then the Houston County District Attorney. In the primary campaign, Baxley had successfully created a widely viewed public impression, whether accurate or not, that he himself would be a better ally of George Wallace.

Gallion opposed school integration. In 1970, while serving his second term as Attorney General, Gallion along with the Attorneys General of Louisiana (Jack P. F Gremillion) and Mississippi (A.F. Summer) filed a legal brief in a case that would mandate that Pasadena schools integrate. The three Southern lawyers did not agree with the Brown v. Board of Education decision but their states were already required to abide by the law. Gallion, Gremillion, and Summer hoped that if states outside the South were also required to desegregate there would be farther reaching resistance by white families and "the operation of schools [would] be returned to the hands of local people". The friend of the court brief admits “the ultimate goal of this honorable court and the Movants herein are perhaps not the same. The ultimate goal of the Movants is to get the Federal Courts out of the operation of our schools."

During his tenure as Attorney General, Gallion successfully led litigation that established Alabama's offshore oil and gas rights. This helped the state later establish what is now a multimillion-dollar trust fund.

Party political offices
Preceded by John M. Patterson	Democratic nominee for Attorney General of Alabama; 1958	Succeeded by Richmond Flowers Sr.
Preceded by Richmond Flowers Sr.	Democratic nominee for Attorney General of Alabama; 1966	Succeeded by Bill Baxley
Legal offices
Preceded by John M. Patterson	Attorney General of Alabama; 1959–1963	Succeeded by Richmond Flowers
Preceded by Richmond Flowers	Attorney General of Alabama; 1967–1971	Succeeded by Bill Baxley
