= 1960 Alabama Democratic presidential elector primary =

- May 3, 1960 (first round); May 31, 1960 (runoff)

11 nominees for the Democratic presidential electoral slate
Candidate	Independents	Loyalists
Alliance	Alabama Democratic	Democratic
First round	1,612,579; 46.95%	1,458,293; 42.46%
Runoff	1,452,374; 49.83%	1,461,697; 50.17%
Electors slated	6	5

The 1960 Alabama Democratic presidential elector primary was held on May 3, 1960, with a runoff on May 31, 1960, to choose the eleven nominees for presidential electors to be listed on the general election ballot under the Democratic party label in the 1960 United States presidential election in Alabama. This election is not to be confused with the 1960 Alabama Democratic presidential primary, which chose delegates to the Democratic National Convention. In 1960, Alabama was the only state where both presidential electors and DNC delegates were elected by popular vote.

The election resulted in the nomination of six States' Rights Democrats, or independents, and five Democrats loyal to the national party. In the general election, all eleven Democratic electors were sent to the Electoral College, where all independents cast votes for Harry F. Byrd and Strom Thurmond, and all loyalist electors cast votes for John F. Kennedy and Lyndon B. Johnson.

== First round ==
Of the 11 elector slots available, only Bruce Henderson was elected outright in the first round.

First round results
Party	Slate	Elector	Votes	%
Democratic	Independent	Bruce Henderson (Note: Elected outright)	166,119	53.20%
Democratic	Independent	Frank M. Dixon	153,865	49.28%
Democratic	Independent	Edmund Blair	152,621	48.88%
Democratic	Loyalist	C. G. Allen	150,550	48.22%
Democratic	Independent	Frank Mizell	150,082	48.07%
Democratic	Independent	W. W. Malone Jr.	147,391	47.21%
Democratic	Independent	Sam M. Johnston	144,926	46.42%
Democratic	Independent	John D. McQueen Jr.	142,850	45.75%
Democratic	Independent	C. E. Hornsby Jr.	142,454	45.63%
Democratic	Independent	John P. Newsome	138,206	44.26%
Democratic	Independent	Walter C. Givhan	137,282	43.97%
Democratic	Independent	Lawrence E. McNeil	136,783	43.81%
Democratic	Loyalist	J. E. Brantley	136,765	43.80%
Democratic	Loyalist	Dave Archer	136,099	43.59%
Democratic	Loyalist	W. L. Chenault	135,028	43.25%
Democratic	Loyalist	C. L. Beard	132,952	42.58%
Democratic	Loyalist	Karl Harrison	131,984	42.27%
Democratic	Loyalist	William D. Partlow	131,261	42.04%
Democratic	Loyalist	Bill Jones	128,768	41.24%
Democratic	Loyalist	Ben F. Ray	125,709	40.26%
Democratic	Loyalist	D. Hardy Riddle	124,998	40.04%
Democratic	Loyalist	Milton K. Cummings	124,179	39.77%
Democratic	Other	Frank Dixon	62,529	20.03%
Democratic	Other	John G. Crommelin	37,549	12.03%
Democratic	Other	Cecil G. Brown	34,799	11.15%
Democratic	Other	Russell H. Carter	30,647	9.82%
Democratic	Other	Kenneth R. Cain	25,398	8.14%
Democratic	Other	Thomas H. Maxwell	25,168	8.06%
Democratic	Other	George Robert Coburn	24,762	7.93%
Democratic	Other	Carl C. Golson	23,819	7.63%
Democratic	Other	Melvin Dassinger	22,112	7.08%
Democratic	Other	Warren K. Cleghorn	20,516	6.57%
Democratic	Other	T. Clint Mills	19,511	6.25%
Democratic	Other	Raymond M. Sharpe	18,775	6.01%
Democratic	Other	Lowell A. Tyson	18,013	5.77%
Total	Independent (states' rights) slate		1,612,579	46.95%
Total	Loyalist (national) slate		1,458,293	42.46%
Total	Others		363,598	10.59%
Total votes			3,434,470	100.00%

== Runoff ==
Runoff election results (unofficial complete results)
Party	Slate	Elector	Votes	%
Democratic	Independent	Frank M. Dixon	160,750	55.16%
Democratic	Loyalist	G. C. Allen	158,230	54.30%
Democratic	Loyalist	Karl Harrison	151,987	52.16%
Democratic	Independent	Edmund Blair	149,501	51.30%
Democratic	Loyalist	J. E. Brantley	148,027	50.80%
Democratic	Independent	W. W. Malone Jr.	147,152	50.50%
Democratic	Loyalist	Dave Archer	146,628	50.32%
Democratic	Loyalist	C. L. Beard	146,021	50.11%
Democratic	Independent	C. E. Hornsby Jr.	144,434	49.56%
Democratic	Independent	Frank Mizell	144,217	49.49%
Democratic	Loyalist	W. D. Partlow	144,045	49.43%
Democratic	Loyalist	W. L. Chenault	143,623	49.29%
Democratic	Independent	Sam Johnston	143,355	49.19%
Democratic	Loyalist	Bill Jones	142,505	48.90%
Democratic	Independent	John McQueen Jr.	142,245	48.81%
Democratic	Independent	Walter Givhan	141,453	48.54%
Democratic	Loyalist	Ben F. Ray	140,623	48.26%
Democratic	Independent	Lawrence McNeil	140,165	48.10%
Democratic	Loyalist	D. Hardy Riddle	140,008	48.05%
Democratic	Independent	John Newsome	139,102	47.74%
Total	Loyalist (national) slate		1,461,697	50.17%
Total	Independent (states' rights) slate		1,452,374	49.83%
Total votes			2,914,071	100.00%
