= James H. Faulkner =

American politician

James Herman Faulkner, Sr. (March 1, 1916 – August 22, 2008) was an American newspaper publisher, entrepreneur, politician, and philanthropist. He has two schools named after him, Faulkner State Community College, and Faulkner University.

== Newspapers and other media ==
He was born on March 1, 1916, in Lamar County, Alabama.

On August 15, 1936, Faulkner bought the Baldwin Times Newspaper in Bay Minette. In 1957 Faulkner joined a group that brought WBCA radio to Bay Minette as well as owning WHEP in Foley.

== Support of education ==
Faulkner was instrumental in getting Faulkner State Junior College built for his town after the Alabama legislature passed a bill in 1964 to build 10 such schools. The pick for Bay Minette's district originally went to Monroeville which received the approval to build the Monroeville campus of the Alabama Southern Community College (originally Patrick Henry Junior College). Subsequently, Faulkner organized a group to convince the state to build a second junior college in the district at Bay Minette and afterwards a school named for William Lowndes Yancey, an American leader of the Southern secession movement, came into existence. In 1971 town residents convinced the governor to rename Yancey in Faulkner's honor.

Faulkner University in Montgomery, Alabama (originally known as Alabama Christian College) was renamed in 1983 to honor Faulkner. It was said that the school would have been forced to close several times if Faulkner had not come to the rescue.

== Industrial recruiter ==
Faulkner was involved with bringing several industries to Bay Minette and Baldwin County. These included International Paper Container Division, Kaiser Aluminum, Alpine Industries Laboratories, Baldwin Utility Structures, Baldwin Lighting, Eastwood-Neally Company, Colt Industries, Jinan, Holland Industrial Services, Gulf Packaging Company, Cedartown Paper Board Cores, Baldwin Asphalt, Yellow Hammer Building Systems, Barclay, Bay Minette Mills, Baldwin Pole and Piling, Den-Tal-Ez, and Standard Furniture.

== Political activities ==
Faulkner served as mayor of Bay Minette from 1941 to 1943, and was said to be the youngest mayor in America at that time. He was also a member of the Alabama State Senate and a two-time candidate for governor.

He died on August 22, 2008, in Bay Minette, Alabama, at the age of 92.
