= Shorty Price =

American lawyer

- Born: William Ralph Price; October 3, 1921; Louisville, Alabama
- Died: November 1, 1980 (aged 59) near Montgomery, Alabama
- Education: University of Alabama Law School
- Occupations: attorney, political candidate
- Spouse: Delores Bigham
- Children: Ralph Jr., Donny Ray, Vicky

William Ralph "Shorty" Price, (October 3, 1921 – November 1, 1980) was an attorney and perennial political candidate from the state of Alabama, mostly noted for his colorful "clown" persona.

A native of Barbour County, he studied in the University of Alabama, where briefly he was a roommate of future Governor George Wallace .

Price ran for many public offices in Alabama, but only won one election - as an alternate delegate to the 1952 Democratic National Convention.

Most notably he ran in the Democratic primaries for Governor of Alabama in 1958, 1970, 1974 and 1978. Although he never captured more than 2% of a vote, he once finished before well-known politician Coleman Brown.

Price campaigned heartily against his former roommate, Wallace. His slogan was Shorty, Shorty, he’s our man. George Wallace belongs in the garbage can.

In 1972 he proposed to shorten the Governor's term from four to two years. Many claimed it was so he could run more often.

Although he was never a political power, Price became a part of southern political and historical folklore in the storied and history of candidates in the south.

Price was famous for his antics at Crimson Tide football games, which sometimes landed him in jail. In 1979, after Price pleaded guilty to public drunkenness and disorderly conduct charges following the Alabama-Tennessee game at Legion Field in Birmingham, Circuit Judge William Cole told him "See you next fall" after imposing a $125 fine. Sometimes, when he campaigned, he wore a red-and-white suit covered with the words "Roll Tide."

Price died in an automobile accident in 1980 at the age of 59.

== Sources and external links ==
- Ourcampaigns (profile and election results)
- Alabama Stuff
- The Birmingham News, Nov. 8 and Dec. 17, 1979 and Nov. 2, 1980
- Trivia Book of the University of Alabama
- Atlanta Magazine article
