= Alabama Attorney General =

Chief legal officer of the U.S. state of Alabama

Attorney General of Alabama
- Seal of the attorney general of Alabama

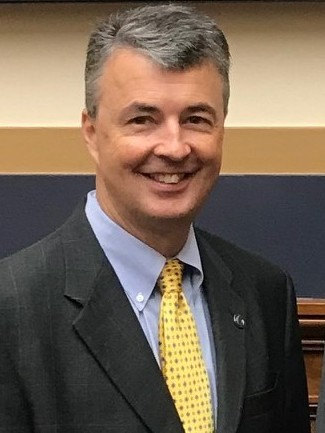
- Incumbent; Steve Marshall since February 10, 2017
- Government of Alabama
- Type: Constitutional officer
- Residence: Montgomery, Alabama
- Appointer: Elected
- Term length: Four years, renewable once consecutively
- Formation: 1819
- First holder: Henry Hitchcock
- Succession: Fourth
- Website: https://www.alabamaag.gov/

The attorney general of Alabama is an elected, constitutional officer of the State of Alabama. The office of the attorney general is located at the state capitol in Montgomery, Alabama. Henry Hitchcock was elected Alabama's first attorney general in 1819.

== Duties ==
As is common in many states, the attorney general is the chief lawyer of the state. He is called upon as the chief defender of the laws of Alabama, the lawyer for state officials and represents the state in all matters brought before a court of law or tribunal. The attorney general (AG) also provides advisory opinions to local and state governments when questions arise about the constitutionality of proposed laws and regulations. It is the task of the attorney general to represent the state when questions arise concerning various criminal sentences including the death penalty.

From time to time, the attorney general may begin legal proceedings on behalf of the state or on behalf of consumers damaged by illegal or bad faith commercial transactions.

== Organization ==
Eight divisions comprise the attorney general's office. Those divisions include: a General Crimes Division, a Public Corruption Division, Civil Division, Appellate Division, Consumer Protection Division, Constitutional Defense Division and a Medicaid Fraud Control Unit. Division chiefs include Clay J. Crenshaw, Olivia Martin, Billington Garret, M. Matt Hart, Bruce M. Lieberman, and Azzie Taylor.

== List of attorneys general of Alabama ==
The chief deputy attorney general is Alice Martin Andrew Brasher previously served as the solicitor general from 2014-2019; Edmund LaCour is the current solicitor general.

#	Image	Name	Took office	Left office	Party
1		Henry Hitchcock	1819	1823	
2		Thomas White	1823	1825	
3		Constantine Perkins	1825	1832	
4		Peter Martin	1832	1836	
5		Alexander Meek	1836	1836	
6		John D. Phelan	1836	1838	Democratic
7		Lincoln Clark	1838	1839	Democratic
8		Matthew W. Lindsay	1839	1843	
9		Thomas D. Clarke	1843	1847	
10		William H. Martin	1847	1847	
11		Marion A. Baldwin	1847	1865	
12		John W. A. Sanford	1865	1868	
13		Benjamin Gardner	1868	1870	
14		John W. A. Sanford	1870	1872	
15		Henry Tompkins	1878	1884	
16		Thomas McClellan	1884	1889	
17		William L. Martin	1889	1894	
18		William C. Fitts	1894	1898	
19		Charles G. Brown	1898	1903	
20		Massey Wilson	1903	1907	
21		Alexander M. Garber	1907	1911	Democratic
22		Robert Brickell	1911	1915	Democratic
23		William Logan Martin	1915	1918	
24		F. Lloyd Tate	1918	1918	
25		Emmet S. Thigpen	1918	1919	
26		James Q. Smith	1919	1921	Democratic
27		Harwell G. Davis	1921	1927	Democratic
28		Charlie C. McCall	1927	1931	
29		Thomas E. Knight	1931	1935	Democratic
30		Albert A. Carmichael	1935	1939	
31		Thomas S. Lawson	1939	1942	
32		William N. McQueen	1943	1947	Democratic
33		Albert A. Carmichael	1947	1951	
34		Si Garrett	1951	1954	
35		Bernard Sykes	1954	1955	
36		John M. Patterson	1955	1959	Democratic
37		MacDonald Gallion	1959	1963	Democratic
38		Richmond Flowers Sr.	1963	1967	Democratic
39		MacDonald Gallion	1967	1971	Democratic
40		Bill Baxley	1971	1979	Democratic
41		Charles Graddick	1979	1987	Democratic
42		Don Siegelman	1987	1991	Democratic
43		Jimmy Evans	1991	1995	Democratic
44		Jeff Sessions	1995	1997	Republican
45		William H. Pryor Jr.	1997	2004	Republican
46		Troy King	2004	2011	Republican
47		Luther Strange	2011	2017	Republican
48		Steve Marshall	2017	present	Republican
